= Outline of Ontario =

Province of Canada

Flag of Ontario

Coat of arms of Ontario

Location of Ontario

The following outline is provided as an overview of and topical guide to Ontario:

Ontario – one of the provinces of Canada, located in east-central Canada. It is Canada's most populous province or territory and fourth largest in total area. It is home to the nation's capital city, Ottawa, and the nation's most populous city, Toronto.

== General reference ==
- Pronunciation: /ɒnˈtɛərioʊ/
- Common English name(s): Ontario
- Official English name(s): Ontario
- Nicknames:
  - The Heartland Province
  - The Province of Opportunity (dated, official provincial slogan, formerly seen on provincial highway construction project signs)
- Common endonym(s): Ontario
- Official endonym(s): Ontario
- Adjectival(s): Ontario
- Demonym(s): Ontarian

== Geography of Ontario ==
Geography of Ontario

- Ontario is: a province of Canada.
- Canada is: a country
- Population of Ontario: 12,851,821 (2011 census)
- Area of Ontario: 917,741 km^{2} (354,342 sq mi)
  - 85.3% land
  - 14.7% water
  - List of Ontario area codes
- Atlas of Ontario

=== Location ===
- Ontario is situated within the following regions:
  - Northern Hemisphere, Western Hemisphere
    - Americas
      - North America
        - Northern America
          - Laurentia
            - Canada
              - Central Canada
              - Eastern Canada
                - Canadian Shield
- Time zones (see also Time in Canada):
  - Eastern Standard Time (UTC-05), Eastern Daylight Time (UTC-04) – includes most of the province
- Extreme points of Ontario
  - Highest point of Ontario
- Landforms of Ontario

=== Environment of Ontario ===
Environment of Ontario

- Climate of Ontario
- Ecology of Ontario
  - Ecoregions in Ontario
  - Renewable energy in Ontario
- Geology of Ontario
- Protected areas of Ontario
  - Biosphere reserves in Ontario
  - National parks in Ontario
  - List of designated places in Ontario
  - List of historic places in Ontario
  - List of National Historic Sites of Canada in Ontario
  - List of Ontario provincial parks
- Wildlife of Ontario
  - Flora of Ontario
  - Fauna of Ontario
    - Birds of Ontario
    - Mammals of Ontario

==== Natural geographic features of Ontario ====
Landforms of Ontario

- Fjords of Ontario
- Glaciers of Ontario
- Islands of Ontario
- Lakes of Ontario
- List of dams and reservoirs in Ontario
- Rivers of Ontario
- Waterfalls of Ontario
- Mountains of Ontario
  - Volcanoes in Ontario
- Valleys of Ontario

=== Heritage sites in Ontario ===
- World Heritage Sites in Ontario (1)
  - Rideau Canal
- National Historic Sites of Canada in Ontario

=== Regions of Ontario ===
- Southern Ontario
  - Central Ontario
  - Eastern Ontario
  - Golden Horseshoe
  - Southwestern Ontario
- Northern Ontario
  - Northeastern Ontario
  - Northwestern Ontario
- Great Lakes

==== Administrative divisions of Ontario ====
Administrative divisions of Ontario

- List of census agglomerations in Ontario
- List of census divisions of Ontario
- List of census subdivisions in Ontario
- List of communities in Ontario
- List of ghost towns in Ontario
- List of Ontario census divisions by population
- List of townships in Ontario
- List of municipalities in Ontario
- List of Ontario federal electoral districts
- List of Ontario separated municipalities
- List of Ontario provincial electoral districts
- List of population centres in Ontario

===== Counties and districts of Ontario =====
The counties of Ontario, each followed by its county seat:

- Bruce County (Walkerton)
- Dufferin County (Orangeville)
- Elgin County (St. Thomas)
- Essex County (Essex)
- Frontenac County (Kingston)
- Grey County (Owen Sound)
- Haliburton County (Minden)
- Hastings County (Belleville)
- Huron County (Goderich)
- Lambton County (Wyoming)
- Lanark County (Perth)
- Leeds and Grenville United Counties (Brockville)
- Lennox and Addington County (Napanee)
- Middlesex County (London)
- Northumberland County (Cobourg)
- Perth County (Stratford)
- Peterborough County (Peterborough)
- Prescott and Russell United Counties (L'Orignal)
- Renfrew County (Pembroke)
- Simcoe County (Springwater Township)
- Stormont, Dundas and Glengarry United Counties (Cornwall)
- Wellington County (Guelph)

The districts of Ontario, each followed by its district seat:

- Algoma District (Sault Ste. Marie)
- Cochrane District (Cochrane)
- Kenora District (Kenora)
- Manitoulin District (Gore Bay)
- Nipissing District (North Bay)
- Parry Sound District (Parry Sound)
- Rainy River District (Fort Frances)
- Sudbury District (Espanola)
- Thunder Bay District (Thunder Bay)
- Timiskaming District (Haileybury)

===== First Nations of Ontario =====
- Anishinabek Nation
- First Nations in Ontario
- List of Indian reserves in Ontario

===== Municipalities of Ontario =====
List of municipalities in Ontario

- Population centres in Ontario
- Municipalities by type
  - Cities of Ontario
    - Capital of Canada; Ottawa
    - Capital of Ontario: Toronto
    - Mississauga
    - Brampton
    - Hamilton
    - London
    - Markham
    - Vaughan
    - Kitchener
    - Windsor
  - communities in Ontario
  - Towns in Ontario
    - Township municipalities in Ontario
  - Villages in Ontario
- Former municipalities in Ontario

=== Demography of Ontario ===
Demographics of Ontario

- List of population centres in Ontario
- List of Ontario census divisions by population
- Population compared to other provinces

== Government and politics of Ontario ==
Politics of Ontario

- Form of government:
- Capital of Ontario: Toronto
- Elections in Ontario
  - List of Ontario general elections
- Political parties in Ontario
- Political scandals of Ontario
- Taxation in Ontario

=== Branches of the government of Ontario ===
Government of Ontario

==== Executive branch of the government of Ontario ====
- Head of state: King in Right of Ontario, King of Canada, King Charles III
  - Head of state's representative (Viceroy): Lieutenant Governor of Ontario, Edith Dumont
    - Previous lieutenant governors
    - Head of government: Premier of Ontario, Doug Ford
      - Previous premiers
        - Premiers of Ontario by time in office
      - Deputy Premier of Ontario
        - Previous Deputy Premiers
      - Cabinet: Executive Council of Ontario
        - Head of council: Lieutenant Governor in Council, as representative of the King in Right of Ontario
        - Leader of the government in parliament
      - Departments of the Ontario Government
        - Ministry of Aboriginal Affairs
        - Ministry of Agriculture, Food and Rural Affairs
        - Ministry of Children and Youth Services
        - Ministry of Citizenship and Immigration
        - Ministry of Community and Social Services
        - Ministry of Consumer Services
        - Ministry of Culture
        - Ministry of Economic Development and Innovation
        - Ministry of Education
        - Ministry of Energy
        - Ministry of Finance
        - Ministry of Government Services
        - Ministry of Health Promotion and Sport
        - Ministry of Intergovernmental Affairs
        - Ministry of International Trade and Investment
        - Ministry of Labour
        - Ministry of Municipal Affairs and Housing
        - Ministry of Natural Resources
        - Ministry of Research and Innovation
        - Ministry of Revenue
        - Ministry of Skills Development
        - Ministry of the Environment
        - Ministry of Tourism and Culture
        - Ministry of Training, Colleges and Universities

==== Legislative branch of the government of Ontario ====
- Parliament of Ontario (unicameral): Legislative Assembly of Ontario
  - Speaker of the Legislative Assembly of Ontario
  - Ontario Legislative Building
  - Ontario Legislative Assemblies
- Federal representation
  - Ontario lieutenant
  - List of Ontario senators

==== Judicial branch of the government of Ontario ====
- Federal Courts of Canada
  - Supreme Court of Canada
  - Federal Court of Appeal
  - Tax Court of Canada
- Canadian court of appeal: Ontario Court of Appeal
- Superior court: Ontario Superior Court
- Provincial Court: Court of Ontario
  - The Civil Division
  - The Criminal and Penal Division
  - The Youth Division
- Military court: Court Martial Appeal Court of Canada

=== International relations of Ontario ===
- Ministry of International Relations
- Ontario Government Offices

=== Law and order in Ontario ===
Law of Ontario

- Bar of Ontario – the provincial law society for lawyers in Ontario (also officially known by its French designation: Barreau de l'Ontario)
- Capital punishment in Ontario: none.
  - Ontario, as with all of Canada, does not have capital punishment.
  - Canada eliminated the death penalty for murder on July 14, 1976.
- Constitution of Ontario
- Criminal justice system of Ontario
- Crime in Ontario
  - Organized crime in Ontario
- Human rights in Ontario
  - LGBT rights in Ontario
    - Same-sex marriage in Ontario
- Law enforcement in Ontario
- Penal system of Ontario
  - Correctional facilities in Ontario

=== Military of Ontario ===
Canadian Forces Being a part of Canada, Ontario does not have its own military.

=== Local government in Ontario ===
- Local government in Ontario
- Municipal Act, 2001

== Culture of Ontario ==
Culture of Ontario

- Architecture of Ontario
  - Tallest buildings in Ontario
- Cuisine of Ontario
  - Ontario wine
- Festivals in Ontario
- Humor in Ontario
- Media in Ontario
- Museums in Ontario
- Order of precedence in Ontario
- People of Ontario
  - List of members of the Order of Ontario
  - List of people from Ontario
- Prostitution in Ontario
- Public holidays in Ontario
- Public libraries in Ontario
- Records of Ontario
- Regional culture in Ontario (culture by region)
  - Culture of Toronto
- Scouting and Guiding in Ontario

=== Art in Ontario ===
- Art in Ontario
- Cinema of Ontario
- Comedy of Ontario
- Dance of Ontario
- Literature of Ontario
- Music of Ontario
  - List of musicians from Ontario
- Television in Ontario
- Theatre in Ontario

=== Religion in Ontario ===
Religion in Ontario

- Buddhism in Ontario
- Christianity in Ontario
  - Anglicanism in Ontario
    - Anglican Diocese of Ontario
  - Roman Catholicism in Ontario
    - Archdiocese of Toronto
- Hinduism in Ontario
- Islam in Ontario
- Judaism in Ontario
- Sikhism in Ontario
- Irreligion in Ontario

=== Sports in Ontario ===
- Curling in Ontario
  - Curling clubs in Ontario
- Baseball in Ontario
- Football in Ontario
- Ice Hockey in Ontario
  - Ontario Hockey League
  - Ice hockey teams in Ontario
  - Ontario Hockey Association Junior A seasons
- Rugby Ontario
- Professional sports teams in Ontario

=== Symbols of Ontario ===
Symbols of Ontario

- Coat of arms of Ontario
- Flag of Ontario
- Provincial flower:
- Provincial bird:
- Provincial tree:
- Provincial motto:
- Provincial symbol:
- Provincial capital:

== Economy and infrastructure of Ontario ==
Economy of Ontario

- Economic rank (by nominal GDP) - This ranking shows only the Rank of Canada, the country in which is located Ontario
- Agriculture in Ontario
- Banking in Ontario
  - National Bank of Canada
  - Royal Bank of Canada
- Communications in Ontario
  - Internet in Ontario
  - Radio stations in Ontario
  - Television in Ontario
    - Television stations in Ontario
  - List of Ontario area codes
- Companies of Ontario
- Currency of Ontario - Ontario is a province and therefore shares its currency with the country in which it is located, Canada.
- Economic history of Ontario
- Energy in Ontario
  - Environmental and energy policy of Ontario
  - Oil industry in Ontario
  - Electricity sector in Ontario
    - Electrical generating stations in Ontario
      - Hydroelectric generating stations in Ontario
      - Wind farms in Ontario
      - Biomass generating stations in Ontario
      - Nuclear generating stations in Ontario
      - Fossil fuel generating stations in Ontario
- Health care in Ontario
  - List of hospitals in Ontario
- Emergency medical services in Ontario
- Mining in Ontario
  - Mines in Ontario
- Ontario Stock Exchange
- Tourism in Ontario
- Water supply and sanitation in Ontario

=== Transport in Ontario ===
Transport in Ontario

- Air transport in Ontario
  - Airlines of Ontario
  - Airports in Ontario
- Rail transport in Ontario
  - Railways in Ontario
- Vehicular transport in Ontario
  - List of automobiles manufactured in Ontario
  - Vehicle registration plates of Ontario
  - Roads in Ontario
    - Ontario Provincial Highway Network
      - List of provincial highways in Ontario
      - 400-series highways
      - Former provincial highways in Ontario
    - County roads in Ontario
    - List of Ontario Tourist Routes

== Education in Ontario ==
Education in Ontario

- Primary education in Ontario
  - School districts in Ontario
  - English educational institutions in Ontario
  - Grade school in Ontario
  - High school in Ontario
- Higher education in Ontario
  - List of Ontario students' associations
  - College education in Ontario
    - Public colleges in Ontario
    - Art schools in Ontario
  - Universities in Ontario
- Museums in Ontario
- Public libraries in Ontario

== See also ==
- Index of Ontario-related articles
- Outline of geography
  - Outline of North America
    - Outline of Canada
      - Outline of Alberta
      - Outline of British Columbia
      - Outline of Manitoba
      - Outline of Nova Scotia
      - Outline of Quebec
      - Outline of Prince Edward Island
      - Outline of Saskatchewan

Articles with Ontario in the name
- Agricultural Research Institute of Ontario
- Alcohol and Gaming Commission of Ontario
- Alzheimer Society of Ontario
- Archaeology in Ontario
- Archives of Ontario
- Art Gallery of Ontario
- Assembly of Catholic Bishops of Ontario
- Association of International Physicians and Surgeons of Ontario
- Association of Management, Administrative and Professional Crown Employees of Ontario
- Association of Municipalities of Ontario
- Association of Power Producers of Ontario
- Association of Professional Geoscientists of Ontario
- Association of Registered Interior Designers of Ontario
- Attorney General of Ontario
- Auditor General of Ontario
- Battle of Ontario
- Bibliography of Ontario
- Bus companies in Ontario
- Canadian Baptists of Ontario and Quebec
- Census divisions of Ontario
- Certified General Accountants of Ontario
- Coat of arms of Ontario
- College of Physicians and Surgeons of Ontario
- College of Physiotherapists of Ontario
- College of Psychologists of Ontario
- College of Respiratory Therapists of Ontario
- Conference of Independent Schools of Ontario Athletic Association
- Council of Ontario Universities
- Court of Ontario
- Dairy Farmers of Ontario
- Demographics of Ontario
- Diocese of Ontario
- Ecclesiastical Province of Ontario
- Educational Computing Organization of Ontario
- Elementary Teachers' Federation of Ontario
- Environmental Commissioner of Ontario
- Executive Council of Ontario
- Federation of Women Teachers' Associations of Ontario
- Financial Services Regulatory Authority of Ontario
- First Presbyterian Church of Ontario Center
- Francophone Assembly of Ontario
- Francophone Association of Municipalities of Ontario
- Grand Lodge of Canada in the Province of Ontario
- Great Seal of Ontario
- Higher education in Ontario
- Higher Education Quality Council of Ontario
- Highways in Ontario
- Historic counties of Ontario
- Hospice Palliative Care Ontario
- Human Rights Tribunal of Ontario
- Index of Ontario-related articles
- John Lewis (Archbishop of Ontario)
- Law Union of Ontario
- Legislative Assembly of Ontario
- Liberal Catholic Church of Ontario
- Lieutenant Governor of Ontario
- Liquor Control Board of Ontario
- Liquor Licensing Board of Ontario
- Métis Nation of Ontario
- Ministers without portfolio in Ontario, 1993–95
- Ministry of Transportation of Ontario
- Mixed martial arts in Ontario
- Monarchy in Ontario
- Municipal elections in Ontario
- Museum of Ontario Archaeology
- Office of the Legislative Assembly of Ontario
- Official Opposition Shadow Cabinet of the 41st Legislative Assembly of Ontario
- Ontario New Democratic Party Shadow Cabinet of the 41st Legislative Assembly of Ontario
- Order of Ontario
- Order of precedence in Ontario
- Organic Council of Ontario
- Police Services Act (Ontario)
- Province of Ontario Savings Office
- Provincial Secretary and Registrar of Ontario
- Real Estate Council of Ontario
- Registered Nurses' Association of Ontario
- Respiratory Therapy Society of Ontario
- Revised Statutes of Ontario
- Roads in Ontario
- Rocket v. Royal College of Dental Surgeons of Ontario
- Royal College of Dental Surgeons of Ontario
- Saint John's School of Ontario
- Same-sex marriage in Ontario
- Small Business Agency of Ontario
- Solicitor General of Ontario
- Speaker of the Legislative Assembly of Ontario
- Supreme Court of Ontario
- The Association of Registered Graphic Designers of Ontario
- Timeline of Ontario history
- Trespass to Property Act (Ontario)
- United Farmers of Ontario
- University of Ontario Institute of Technology
- University of Ontario Institute of Technology Ridgebacks
- Value-added wood products in Ontario
- Vehicle registration plates of Ontario
- 182nd Battalion (Ontario County), CEF
- 1996 Southern Ontario tornadoes
- 1998 Ontario Raiders season
- 19th Battalion (Central Ontario), CEF
- 1st (Western Ontario) Battalion
- 2005 Ontario Kia Cup
- 2006 Ontario Kia Cup
- 2006 Ontario Scott Tournament of Hearts
- 2006 Ontario terrorism plot
- 2007 Ontario Scotties Tournament of Hearts
- 2008 Ontario Scotties Tournament of Hearts
- 2009 Ontario Scotties Tournament of Hearts
- 2010 Ontario Men's Curling Championship
- 2010 Ontario Scotties Tournament of Hearts
- 2011 Ontario Scotties Tournament of Hearts
- 2012–13 Ontario Curling Tour
- 2012 Courtesy Freight Northern Ontario Superspiel
- 2012 Ontario Scotties Tournament of Hearts
- 2013 Ontario Scotties Tournament of Hearts
- 20th Battalion (Central Ontario), CEF
- 2nd Battalion (Eastern Ontario Regiment), CEF
- 37th (Northern Ontario) Battalion, CEF
- 401 East Ontario
- 41st Ontario general election
- 4th Battalion (Central Ontario), CEF
- Adler v. Ontario
- Adoption Disclosure Register (Ontario)
- AFL Ontario
- Air Ontario
- Air Ontario Flight 1363
- All Saints Catholic High School (Ontario)
- Allan Water (Ontario)
- Anti-Drug Secretariat (Ontario)
- Ask Ontario
- Attorney-General for Ontario v. Attorney-General for the Dominion
- Ault Park (Ontario)
- Baseball Ontario
- Bear Brook (Ontario)
- Bearbrook, Ontario
- Beaver Valley (Ontario)
- Black River Escarpment (Ontario)
- Blainey v. Ontario Hockey Association
- Bob Wood (Ontario provincial politician)
- Brockville Ontario Speedway
- Bruce (Ontario provincial electoral district)
- Byng Inlet (Ontario)
- C.U.P.E. v. Ontario (Minister of Labour)
- CAA South Central Ontario
- Caledonia High School (Ontario)
- Canadian federal election results in Central Ontario
- Canadian federal election results in Eastern Ontario
- Canadian federal election results in Midwestern Ontario
- Canadian federal election results in Northern Ontario
- Canadian federal election results in Southwestern Ontario
- Cancer Care Ontario
- Canyon View High School (Ontario, California)
- Carleton (Ontario federal electoral district)
- Catholic District School Board of Eastern Ontario
- Central Lake Ontario Conservation Authority
- Central Ontario
- Central Ontario Hockey League
- Central Ontario Junior C Hockey League
- Central Ontario Visitor
- Central Ontario Women's Hockey League
- Central Western Ontario Secondary Schools Association
- ChangeTheWorld: Ontario Youth Volunteer Challenge
- Chief Government Whip (Ontario)
- Children's Hospital at London Health Sciences Centre
- Children's Hospital of Eastern Ontario
- Chronic disease in Northern Ontario
- Citizens' Assembly on Electoral Reform (Ontario)
- Clean Water Act (Ontario)
- Co-operative Commonwealth Federation (Ontario Section)
- Commissioner of the Ontario Provincial Police
- Community Living Ontario
- Conseil des écoles publiques de l'Est de l'Ontario
- Conseil scolaire de district catholique du Nouvel-Ontario
- Conseil scolaire de district du Grand Nord de l'Ontario
- Conseil scolaire de district du Nord-Est de l'Ontario
- Conservation Ontario
- Court of Appeal for Ontario
- Courtesy Freight Northern Ontario Superspiel
- Crown agency (Ontario)
- Crown Attorney's Office (Ontario)
- CTV Northern Ontario
- Cuddy Chicks Ltd. v. Ontario (Labour Relations Board)
- CUPE Ontario and disinvestment from Israel
- Davenport railway station (Ontario)
- DECA Ontario
- District School Board Ontario North East
- Don Scott (Ontario author)
- Dunmore v. Ontario (Attorney General)
- East Ontario (Metrolink station)
- Eastern Ontario
- Eastern Ontario Junior Hockey League
- Eastern Ontario Senior Hockey League
- EHealth Ontario
- Elections Ontario
- Electricity policy of Ontario
- Engagements on Lake Ontario
- Fairness Commissioner (Ontario)
- Family Law Act (Ontario)
- First Nations Police (Ontario)
- First Ontario Parliament Buildings
- Foodland Ontario
- Fort Ontario
- Fort Ontario Emergency Refugee Shelter
- Fort St. Joseph (Ontario)
- Frontenac (Ontario electoral district)
- Gaming Control Act (Ontario)
- Gaming Control Commission Ontario
- Georgian Mid-Ontario Junior C Hockey League
- Government House (Ontario)
- Government House Leader (Ontario)
- Grand River Bridge (Ontario)
- Greater Ontario Junior Hockey League
- Greenwood (Ontario provincial electoral district)
- Hamilton Public Library (Ontario)
- Health Care Consent Act (Ontario)
- HealthForceOntario
- High Rock (Ontario)
- Highway Traffic Act (Ontario)
- Hike Ontario
- HMCS Ontario
- HMCS Ontario (C53)
- HMS Ontario
- HMS Ontario (1780)
- Hockey Northwestern Ontario
- Kawartha lakes (Ontario)
- Kent (Ontario federal electoral district)
- King's University College (University of Western Ontario)
- Kings Creek (Mississippi River Ontario)
- Kingston City Hall (Ontario)
- Knowledge Ontario
- La Galerie du Nouvel-Ontario
- Ladies Ontario Hockey Association
- Landscape Ontario
- Laurentian River System (Ontario)
- Lavigne v. Ontario Public Service Employees Union
- Layland v. Ontario
- Leader of the Opposition (Ontario)
- Legal Aid Ontario
- Liquor Licence Act (Ontario)
- List of curlers from Ontario
- List of historical TVOntario transmitters
- List of musicians from Ontario
- List of people from Ontario
- List of programs broadcast by TVOntario
- List of schools of the Conseil des écoles publiques de l'Est de l'Ontario
- List of teams on the 2012-13 Ontario Curling Tour
- List of United Farmers/Labour MLAs in the Ontario legislature
- List of University of Western Ontario people
- Local services board (Ontario)
- Loch Lomond (Thunder Bay District)
- London Fringe Theatre Festival (Ontario)
- London Ontario Live Arts Festival
- Lovelace v. Ontario
- Management Board Secretariat (Ontario)
- Mara Provincial Park (Ontario)
- Member of Provincial Parliament (Ontario)
- Mental Health Act (Ontario)
- Michigan-Ontario League
- Mid-Ontario Junior B Hockey League
- MoveOntario 2020
- Muskoka—Ontario
- Natural Environment Park (Ontario)
- Nature Reserve Park (Ontario)
- Nelson High School (Ontario)
- North Channel (Ontario)
- Northeastern Ontario
- Northern College (Ontario)
- Northern Ontario
- Northern Ontario Curling Association
- Northern Ontario Heritage Fund
- Northern Ontario Hockey Association
- Northern Ontario Junior Hockey Association
- Northern Ontario Junior Hockey League
- Northern Ontario Natural Gas
- Northern Ontario Resource Trail
- Northern Ontario Ring of Fire
- Northern Ontario School of Architecture
- Northern Ontario School of Medicine
- Northern Ontario Secondary Schools Association
- Northumberland (Ontario electoral district)
- Northwestern Ontario
- Northwestern Ontario Junior Hockey League
- Northwestern Ontario Sports Hall of Fame
- Office of the Integrity Commissioner (Ontario)
- Online Donor Registry (Ontario)
- Ontario
- Ontario's Drive Clean
- Ontario-Montclair School District
- Ontario (Amtrak station)
- Ontario (Attorney General) v. Canada Temperance Federation
- Ontario Academic Credit
- Ontario Agricorp
- Ontario Agricultural College
- Ontario Amateur Softball Association
- Ontario and Livingston Mutual Insurance Office
- Ontario Apartments
- Ontario Archaeological Society
- Ontario Arts Council
- Ontario Association of Art Galleries
- Ontario Association of Certified Engineering Technicians and Technologists
- Ontario Association of Food Banks
- Ontario Bank
- Ontario Blues
- Ontario Bond Scandal
- Ontario Cancer Institute
- Ontario CCF/NDP leadership elections
- Ontario Central Airlines
- Ontario Centre of Forensic Sciences
- Ontario Certified Teacher
- Ontario Charitable Gaming Association
- Ontario Civilian Commission on Police Services Board of Inquiry
- Ontario Civilian Police Commission
- Ontario Classical Association
- Ontario Clean Water Agency
- Ontario Co-operative Association
- Ontario Coalition Against Poverty
- Ontario Colleen Stakes
- Ontario College Advanced Diploma
- Ontario College Application Service
- Ontario College of Certified Social Workers
- Ontario College of Family Physicians
- Ontario College of Teachers
- Ontario Colleges Athletic Association
- Ontario Confederation of University Faculty Associations
- Ontario Consultants on Religious Tolerance
- Ontario Correctional Services
- Ontario Cottage
- Ontario County
- Ontario Court of Justice
- Ontario Craft Brewers
- Ontario Crafts Council
- Ontario Cup
- Ontario Curling Association
- Ontario Curling Tour
- Ontario Damsel Stakes
- Ontario Debutante Stakes
- Ontario Dental Association
- Ontario Deposit Return Program
- Ontario Derby
- Ontario Disability Support Program
- Ontario Educational Resource Bank
- 2007 Ontario electoral reform referendum
- Ontario electoral reform referendum, 2007 detailed results
- Ontario Energy Board
- Ontario English Catholic Teachers' Association
- Ontario Express
- Ontario Fashion Stakes
- Ontario Federation of Agriculture
- Ontario Federation of Anglers and Hunters
- Ontario Federation of Labour
- Ontario Federation of School Athletic Associations
- Ontario Federation of Snowmobile Clubs
- Ontario Film Review Board
- Ontario Food Terminal
- Ontario Forest Research Institute
- Ontario Gazette
- Ontario Genomics Institute
- Ontario Geological Survey
- Ontario Global Edge Program
- Ontario Government Buildings
- Ontario Graduate Scholarship
- Ontario Greenbelt
- Ontario Gurdwara Committee
- Ontario Handweavers & Spinners
- Ontario Health Insurance Plan
- Ontario Heritage Act
- Ontario Heritage Trust
- Ontario High School
- Ontario Hockey Association
- Ontario Hockey Federation
- Ontario Hockey League
- Ontario Hockey League history
- Ontario Horticultural Association
- Ontario Hospital Association
- Ontario Human Rights Code
- Ontario Human Rights Commission
- Ontario Human Rights Commission and O'Malley v. Simpsons-Sears Ltd.
- Ontario Human Rights Commission v. Etobicoke
- Ontario Hydro
- Ontario Hydro v. Ontario (Labour Relations Board)
- Ontario Institute for Cancer Research
- Ontario Institute for Studies in Education
- Ontario Institute of Audio Recording Technology
- Ontario Junior A Lacrosse League
- Ontario Junior B Lacrosse League
- Ontario Junior Hockey League
- Ontario Khalsa Darbar
- Ontario Knife Company
- Ontario Labour Relations Board
- Ontario Lacrosse Association
- Ontario Lacus
- Ontario Landowners Association
- Ontario Lassie Stakes
- Ontario League
- Ontario Legislative Building
- Ontario Library Association
- Ontario Linux Fest
- Ontario Local School District
- Ontario Lottery and Gaming Corporation
- Ontario March of Dimes
- Ontario Mathematics Olympiad
- Ontario Matron Stakes
- Ontario Medal for Good Citizenship
- Ontario Medal for Young Volunteers
- Ontario Medical Association
- Ontario men's provincial floorball team
- Ontario micropolitan area
- Ontario Mills
- Ontario Minamata disease
- Ontario Minor Hockey Association
- Ontario Model Parliament
- Ontario Morning
- Ontario Motor Speedway
- Ontario Motor Vehicle Industry Council
- Ontario Municipal Board
- 1972 Ontario municipal elections
- 1976 Ontario municipal elections
- 1978 Ontario municipal elections
- 1980 Ontario municipal elections
- 1982 Ontario municipal elections
- 1985 Ontario municipal elections
- 1988 Ontario municipal elections
- 1991 Ontario municipal elections
- 1994 Ontario municipal elections
- 1997 Ontario municipal elections
- 2003 Ontario municipal elections
- 2006 Ontario municipal elections
- 2010 Ontario municipal elections
- 2014 Ontario municipal elections
- Ontario Nature
- Ontario North
- Ontario Northland Motor Coach Services
- Ontario Northland Transportation Commission
- Ontario Nurses' Association
- Ontario Ombudsman
- Ontario Open
- Ontario Options
- Ontario Out of Doors
- Ontario Parks
- Ontario Parliament Network
- Ontario Pathways Rail Trail
- Ontario PC Youth Association
- Ontario Peak
- Ontario Place
- Ontario Place (theme park)
- Ontario Police College
- Ontario Pork Producers' Marketing Board
- Ontario Power Authority
- Ontario Power Building
- Ontario Power Generation
- Ontario Power Generation's Deep Geologic Repository
- Ontario Prehospital Advanced Life Support Studies
- Ontario Press Council
- Ontario Professional Hockey League
- Ontario Professional Planners Institute
- 1894 Ontario prohibition plebiscite
- 1902 Ontario prohibition referendum
- 1919 Ontario prohibition referendum
- 1921 Ontario prohibition referendum
- 1924 Ontario prohibition referendum
- 2007 Ontario provincial by-elections
- Ontario Provincial Junior A Hockey League (1972–1987)
- Ontario Provincial Police
- Ontario provincial spending, 2004
- Ontario Public Service Employees Union
- Ontario Raiders
- Ontario Real Estate Association
- Ontario Regiment Museum
- Ontario Reign
- Ontario rubric
- Ontario Rugby Football Union
- Ontario Rugby League Competition
- Ontario Rugby Union
- Ontario Savings Bond
- Ontario Scholar
- Ontario Science Centre
- Ontario Scotties Tournament of Hearts
- Ontario Secondary School Diploma
- Ontario Secondary School Literacy Test
- Ontario Secondary School Teachers' Federation
- Ontario Securities Commission
- Ontario Seniors' Secretariat
- Ontario Shores Centre for Mental Health Sciences
- Ontario silver mine
- Ontario Sire Stakes
- Ontario Soccer Association
- Ontario Soccer League
- Ontario Social Benefits Tribunal
- Ontario Social Safety Network
- Ontario Society for the Prevention of Cruelty to Animals
- Ontario Society of Artists
- Ontario Software Acquisition Program Advisory Committee
- Ontario South
- Ontario State Recreation Site
- Ontario Student Assistance Program
- Ontario Student Classics Conference
- Ontario Student Trustees' Association
- Ontario Students Against Impaired Driving
- Ontario Superior Court of Justice
- Ontario Sustainable Energy Association
- Ontario Teachers' Federation
- Ontario Teachers' Pension Plan
- Ontario Telecommunications Association
- Ontario Telephone Service Commission
- Ontario Temperance Act
- Ontario tobacco belt
- Ontario Today
- Ontario Tower
- Ontario Tower (Dubai)
- Ontario Township
- Ontario Township, Knox County, Illinois
- Ontario Track and Field Association
- Ontario Truck
- Ontario Undergraduate Student Alliance
- Ontario Universities' Application Centre
- Ontario Universities Fair
- Ontario University Athletics
- Ontario University Athletics women's ice hockey
- Ontario v. Quon
- Ontario Veterans Memorial
- Ontario Veterinary College
- Ontario Visual Heritage Project
- Ontario Warriors
- Ontario Warriors (ABA)
- Ontario West
- Ontario wine
- Ontario Women's Directorate
- Ontario Young Liberals
- Ontario Youth Parliament
- Ontario.2048
- Ontarioville, Illinois
- Park Place (Ontario)
- Pepsi Ontario Junior Curling Championships
- Preston High School (Ontario)
- Professional Engineers Ontario
- Queen's Printer for Ontario
- Recreation Park (Ontario)
- Regional Chair (Ontario)
- Residential Tenancies Act (Ontario)
- Results of the Canadian federal election, 2006: Ontario
- Royal Botanical Gardens (Ontario)
- Royal Ontario Museum
- Russell (Ontario federal electoral district)
- Russell High School (Ontario)
- ServiceOntario
- Silver Lake Provincial Park (Ontario)
- Slate Islands (Ontario)
- Sleeping Giant (Ontario)
- Social Contract (Ontario)
- Southern Ontario
- Southern Ontario Gothic
- Southern Ontario Junior A Hockey League
- Southern Ontario Junior Hockey League
- Southern Ontario Library Service
- Southern Ontario tornado outbreak of 2005
- Southern Ontario Tornado Outbreak of 2009
- Southwestern Ontario
- Sportsnet Ontario
- St. Andrew's College (Ontario)
- St. Augustine Catholic High School (Ontario)
- St. George (Ontario provincial electoral district)
- St. Marys River (Michigan–Ontario)
- Storyland (Ontario)
- The Dominion 2009 Northern Ontario Provincial Men's Championship
- The Dominion 2010 Northern Ontario Provincial Men's Championship
- The Dominion 2011 Northern Ontario Men's Curling Championship
- The Dominion 2012 Northern Ontario Men's Curling Championship
- The Dominion Northern Ontario Men's Curling Championship
- The Ontario Regiment (RCAC)
- The Ontarion
- Théâtre du Nouvel-Ontario
- Thomas Baines (Ontario)
- Thunder Bay (Ontario landform)
- Toronto Ontario Temple
- Toronto Ontarios
- Transit Eastern Ontario
- TVOntario
- Unionville High School (Ontario)
- University of Western Ontario
- Victoria (Ontario electoral district)
- Victoria Hall (Ontario)
- Virtual High School (Ontario)
- Weber v. Ontario Hydro
- Western Ontario Athletic Association
- Western Ontario Hockey League
- Western Ontario Junior C Hockey League
- Western Ontario Mustangs
- Western Ontario Mustangs women's ice hockey
- White Lake Provincial Park (Ontario)
- Yobgorgle: Mystery Monster of Lake Ontario

Largest cities or towns in Ontario http://www.citypopulation.de/Canada-Ontario.html
Rank	Name	Pop.
1	Toronto	2,615,060
2	Ottawa	883,391
3	Mississauga	713,443
4	Brampton	523,911
5	Hamilton	519,949
6	London	366,151
7	Markham	301,709
8	Vaughan	288,301
9	Kitchener	219,153
10	Windsor	210,891

Categories with Ontario in the name
- Category:Indigenous peoples in Ontario
- Category:Accidental deaths in Ontario
- Category:Aerial photographs of Ontario roads
- Category:Aerospace museums in Ontario
- Category:Airports in Ontario
- Category:Airports in Ontario by census division
- Category:Anglican Church in Ontario
- Category:Anglican church buildings in Ontario
- Category:Anglican Diocese of Ontario
- Category:Anishinaabe reserves in Ontario
- Category:Art museums and galleries in Ontario
- Category:Attorneys general of Ontario
- Category:Automobile museums in Ontario
- Category:Aviation in Ontario
- Category:Baseball in Ontario
- Category:Baseball teams in Ontario
- Category:Bays of Ontario
- Category:Beaches of Ontario
- Category:Bike paths in Ontario
- Category:Boarding schools in Ontario
- Category:Bodies of water of Ontario
- Category:Borders of Ontario
- Category:Bridges in Ontario
- Category:Buildings and structures in Ontario
- Category:Buildings and structures in Ontario by census division
- Category:Buildings and structures in Ontario by city
- Category:Buildings and structures in Ontario by census division
- Category:Bus stations in Ontario
- Category:Bus transport in Ontario
- Category:Canadian federal election results in Ontario
- Category:Canadian football in Ontario
- Category:Canadian football teams in Ontario
- Category:Canadian Forces bases in Ontario
- Category:Canadian National Railway stations in Ontario
- Category:Canadian Pacific Railway stations in Ontario
- Category:Canals in Ontario
- Category:Deaths from cancer in Ontario
- Category:Candidates in Ontario provincial elections
- Category:Canyons and gorges of Ontario
- Category:Carpenter Gothic church buildings in Ontario
- Category:Casinos in Ontario
- Category:Catholic Church in Ontario
- Category:Catholic churches in Ontario
- Category:Catholic elementary schools in Ontario
- Category:Catholic school districts in Ontario
- Category:Catholic schools in Ontario
- Category:Catholic secondary schools in Ontario
- Category:Cemeteries in Ontario
- Category:Census divisions of Ontario
- Category:Christianity in Ontario
- Category:Churches in Ontario
- Category:Cinema of Ontario
- Category:Cinemas and movie theatres in Ontario
- Category:Cities in Ontario
- Category:City and town halls in Ontario
- Category:Coal-fired power stations in Ontario
- Category:Collection of the Art Gallery of Ontario
- Category:Colleges in Ontario
- Category:Historic trails and roads in Ontario
- Category:Communications in Ontario
- Category:Communist Party of Canada (Ontario) candidates in Ontario provincial elections
- Category:Communities in Ontario by census division
- Category:Companies based in Ontario
- Category:Conservation areas in Ontario
- Category:Conservation authorities in Ontario
- Category:County and regional councils in Ontario
- Category:Cree reserves in Ontario
- Category:Crime in Ontario
- Category:Crown corporations of Ontario
- Category:Culture of Ontario
- Category:Culture of Ontario by city
- Category:Culture of Ontario by location
- Category:Curling in Ontario
- Category:Dams in Ontario
- Category:Death in Ontario
- Category:Deaths by firearm in Ontario
- Category:Defunct airports in Ontario
- Category:Defunct ice hockey leagues in Ontario
- Category:Deputy premiers of Ontario
- Category:Designated places in Ontario
- Category:Diatremes of Ontario
- Category:Disasters in Ontario
- Category:Disease-related deaths in Ontario
- Category:Earthquakes in Ontario
- Category:Economy of Ontario
- Category:Education in Ontario
- Category:Education in Ontario by census division
- Category:Elections in Ontario
- Category:Elementary schools in Ontario
- Category:Endemic fauna of Ontario
- Category:Energy in Ontario
- Category:Ethnic groups in Ontario
- Category:Executive Council of Ontario
- Category:Family Coalition Party of Ontario candidates in Ontario provincial elections
- Category:Family Coalition Party of Ontario politicians
- Category:Ferries of Ontario
- Category:Ferry companies of Ontario
- Category:Ferry transport in Ontario
- Category:Festivals in Ontario
- Category:Films set in Ontario
- Category:Films shot in Ontario
- Category:First Nations governments in Ontario
- Category:First Nations history in Ontario
- Category:First Nations in Ontario
- Category:First Nations organizations in Ontario
- Category:Flora of Ontario
- Category:Forests of Ontario
- Category:Former counties in Ontario
- Category:Former counties in Ontario
- Category:Former municipalities in Ontario
- Category:Former populated places in Ontario
- Category:Former school districts in Ontario
- Category:Former townships in Ontario
- Category:Forts in Ontario
- Category:Freedom Party of Ontario candidates in Ontario provincial elections
- Category:Freedom Party of Ontario politicians
- Category:French-language education in Ontario
- Category:French-language elementary schools in Ontario
- Category:French-language high schools in Ontario
- Category:French-language mass media in Ontario
- Category:French-language newspapers published in Ontario
- Category:French-language radio stations in Ontario
- Category:French-language school districts in Ontario
- Category:French-language schools in Ontario
- Category:French-language television stations in Ontario
- Category:General elections in Ontario
- Category:Geographic regions of Ontario
- Category:Geography of Ontario
- Category:Geography of Ontario by census division
- Category:Geography of Ontario by city
- Category:Geology of Ontario
- Category:Ghost towns in Ontario
- Category:Golf clubs and courses in Ontario
- Category:Government of Ontario
- Category:Green Party of Ontario
- Category:Green Party of Ontario candidates in Ontario provincial elections
- Category:Green Party of Ontario politicians
- Category:Health in Ontario
- Category:Health regions of Ontario
- Category:Heritage railways in Ontario
- Category:Heritage sites in Ontario
- Category:High schools in Ontario
- Category:Higher education in Ontario
- Category:Hiking trails in Ontario
- Category:Townships of Ontario
- Category:Progressive Conservative Party of Ontario MPPs
- Category:History of Ontario
- Category:History of Ontario by location
- Category:Holidays in Ontario
- Category:Hospitals in Ontario
- Category:Hotels in Ontario
- Category:Houses in Ontario
- Category:Hydroelectric power stations in Ontario
- Category:Ice hockey governing bodies in Ontario
- Category:Ice hockey in Ontario
- Category:Ice hockey leagues in Ontario
- Category:Ice hockey players in Ontario
- Category:Ice hockey teams in Ontario
- Category:Ice hockey teams in Ontario by league
- Category:Images of Ontario
- Category:Impact craters of Ontario
- Category:Important Bird Areas of Ontario
- Category:Independent candidates in Ontario provincial elections
- Category:Independent MPPs in Ontario
- Category:Indian reserves in Ontario
- Category:Indigenous leaders in Ontario
- Category:Infectious disease deaths in Ontario
- Category:International Baccalaureate schools in Ontario
- Category:Interurban railways in Ontario
- Category:Islands of Ontario
- Category:Jews and Judaism in Ontario
- Category:Judges in Ontario
- Category:Labor-Progressive Party of Ontario MPPs
- Category:Labor-Progressive Party of Ontario MPPs
- Category:Labour MPPs in Ontario
- Category:Lacrosse in Ontario
- Category:Lacrosse teams in Ontario
- Category:Lakes of Ontario
- Category:Lakes of Ontario by census division
- Category:Landforms of Ontario
- Category:Law enforcement agencies of Ontario
- Category:Lawyers in Ontario
- Category:Leaders of the Freedom Party of Ontario
- Category:Leaders of the Green Party of Ontario
- Category:Leaders of the Progressive Conservative Party of Ontario
- Category:Leaders of the United Farmers of Ontario/Progressives
- Category:Legislative Assembly of Ontario
- Category:LGBTQ in Ontario
- Category:Libraries in Ontario
- Category:Lieutenant governors of Ontario
- Category:Lighthouses in Ontario
- Category:Lists of historic places in Ontario
- Category:Lists of mayors of places in Ontario
- Category:Lists of Ontario county roads
- Category:Lists of political office-holders in Ontario
- Category:Lists of roads in Ontario
- Category:Local government in Ontario
- Category:Local government in Ontario by city
- Category:Local services boards in Ontario
- Category:Magazines published in Ontario
- Category:Maps of Ontario federal electoral districts
- Category:Maps of Ontario provincial electoral districts
- Category:Maritime museums in Ontario
- Category:Marshes of Ontario
- Category:Mayors of places in Ontario
- Category:Mass media in Ontario by city
- Category:Mass media in Ontario by region
- Category:Mass media in Ontario
- Category:Members of the Executive Council of Ontario
- Category:Members of the Legislative Assembly of Ontario
- Category:Members of the Order of Ontario
- Category:Metropolitan areas of Ontario
- Category:Metropolitans of Ontario
- Category:Middle schools in Ontario
- Category:Military forts in Ontario
- Category:Mines in Ontario
- Category:Mining communities in Ontario
- Category:Mining in Ontario
- Category:Ministers of finance of Ontario
- Category:Mohawk reserves in Ontario
- Category:Monuments and memorials in Ontario
- Category:Mosques in Ontario
- Category:Mountain ranges of Ontario
- Category:Mountains of Ontario
- Category:Municipal councils in Ontario
- Category:Municipal elections in Ontario
- Category:Municipal elections in Ontario by city
- Category:Municipal parks in Ontario
- Category:Municipalities in Ontario by census division
- Category:Museum ships in Ontario
- Category:Museums in Ontario
- Category:Museums in Ontario by census division
- Category:Music festivals in Ontario
- Category:Music venues in Ontario
- Category:Narrow-gauge railways in Ontario
- Category:National Historic Sites in Ontario
- Category:National Hockey League in Ontario
- Category:Native grasses of Ontario
- Category:Natural areas in Ontario
- Category:Natural disasters in Ontario
- Category:Natural gas-fired power stations in Ontario
- Category:Natural history of Ontario
- Category:Natural Law Party of Ontario politicians
- Category:Nature centres in Ontario
- Category:Neighbourhoods in Ontario
- Category:Newspapers published in Ontario
- Category:Novels set in Ontario
- Category:Nuclear power stations in Ontario
- Category:Oil-fired power stations in Ontario
- Category:Oji-Cree reserves in Ontario
- Category:Anishinaabe reserves in Ontario
- Category:Ontario Liberal Party candidates in Ontario provincial elections
- Category:Ontario Libertarian Party candidates in Ontario provincial elections
- Category:Ontario New Democratic Party candidates in Ontario provincial elections
- Category:Organizations based in Ontario
- Category:Parks in Ontario
- Category:Parks in Ontario by census division
- Category:Parkways in Ontario
- Category:Passenger rail transport in Ontario
- Category:Passenger railways in Ontario
- Category:Peninsulas of Ontario
- Category:People from Ontario by populated place
- Category:People from Ontario by county, district, or region
- Category:People murdered in Ontario
- Category:Political history of Ontario
- Category:Politicians in Ontario
- Category:Politics of Ontario
- Category:Politics of Ontario by locality
- Category:Populated places in Ontario
- Category:Port settlements in Ontario
- Category:Ports and harbours of Ontario
- Category:Power stations in Ontario
- Category:Premiers of Ontario
- Category:Preparatory schools in Ontario
- Category:Presidents of the Green Party of Ontario
- Category:Presidents of the Progressive Conservative Party of Ontario
- Category:Prisons in Ontario
- Category:Private universities and colleges in Ontario
- Category:Private schools in Ontario
- Category:Progressive Conservative Party of Ontario
- Category:Progressive Conservative Party of Ontario candidates in Ontario provincial elections
- Category:Progressive Conservative Party of Ontario MPPs
- Category:Progressive Conservative Party of Ontario politicians
- Category:Protected areas of Ontario
- Category:Protected areas of Ontario by census division
- Category:Provincial parks of Ontario
- Category:Provincial political parties in Ontario
- Category:Provincial Secretaries of Ontario
- Category:Provincial symbols of Ontario
- Category:Public libraries in Ontario
- Category:Public transport in Ontario
- Category:Racehorses bred in Ontario
- Category:Radio stations in Ontario
- Category:Rail infrastructure in Ontario
- Category:Rail trails in Ontario
- Category:Rail transport in Ontario
- Category:Railway bridges in Ontario
- Category:Railway museums in Ontario
- Category:Railway roundhouses in Ontario
- Category:Railway stations in Ontario
- Category:Railway tunnels in Ontario
- Category:Ramsar sites in Ontario
- Category:Referendums in Ontario
- Category:Reform Party of Ontario politicians
- Category:Regional airlines of Ontario
- Category:Religion in Ontario
- Category:Religious buildings and structures in Ontario
- Category:Reptiles of Ontario
- Category:Restaurants in Ontario
- Category:Rivers of Ontario
- Category:Rivers of Ontario by census division
- Category:Road bridges in Ontario
- Category:Roads in Ontario
- Category:Roads in Ontario by census division
- Category:Roads in Ontario by city
- Category:Roller coasters in Ontario
- Category:Rugby union in Ontario
- Category:Rugby union teams in Ontario
- Category:School districts in Ontario
- Category:Schools in Ontario
- Category:Schools in Ontario by census division
- Category:Schools in Ontario by city
- Category:Ships built in Ontario
- Category:Shopping malls in Ontario
- Category:Ski areas and resorts in Ontario
- Category:Soccer clubs in Ontario
- Category:Soccer in Ontario
- Category:Speakers of the Legislative Assembly of Ontario
- Category:Sports in Ontario
- Category:Sports in Ontario by city
- Category:Sports governing bodies in Ontario
- Category:Sports teams in Ontario
- Category:Sports venues in Ontario
- Category:Sportspeople in Ontario
- Category:Stratigraphy of Ontario
- Category:Student newspapers published in Ontario
- Category:Geographic regions of Ontario
- Category:Suicides by firearm in Ontario
- Category:Suicides by hanging in Ontario
- Category:Suicides in Ontario
- Category:Synagogues in Ontario
- Category:Television shows set in Ontario
- Category:Television shows shot in Ontario
- Category:Television stations in Ontario
- Category:Theatre companies in Ontario
- Category:Theatre in Ontario
- Category:Theatres in Ontario
- Category:Tourism in Ontario
- Category:Towers in Ontario
- Category:Towns in Ontario
- Category:Township municipalities in Ontario
- Category:Townships of Ontario
- Category:Transit agencies in Ontario
- Category:Transport in Ontario
- Category:Transport in Ontario by census division
- Category:Transport in Ontario by city
- Category:Transport museums in Ontario
- Category:Trees of Ontario
- Category:Tunnels in Ontario
- Category:Uninhabited islands of Ontario
- Category:Union of Ontario Indians
- Category:United Church of Canada churches in Ontario
- Category:United Farmers of Ontario MLAs
- Category:United Farmers of Ontario MPs
- Category:United Farmers of Ontario politicians
- Category:Universities and colleges in Ontario
- Category:Universities in Ontario
- Category:University of Ontario Institute of Technology
- Category:Unorganized areas in Ontario
- Category:Valleys of Ontario
- Category:Via Rail stations in Ontario
- Category:Villages in Ontario
- Category:Tourist attractions in Ontario
- Category:Tourist attractions in Ontario by census division
- Category:Volcanism of Ontario
- Category:Volcanoes of Ontario
- Category:Water transport in Ontario
- Category:Waterfalls of Ontario
- Category:Weekly newspapers published in Ontario
- Category:Wetlands of Ontario
- Category:Wikipedia requested maps in Ontario
- Category:Wikipedia requested photographs in Ontario
- Category:Wikipedia requested images of people of Ontario
- Category:Wikipedians in Ontario
- Category:Wikipedians in Ontario, California
- Category:Wikipedians interested in Ontario
- Category:Wind farms in Ontario
- Category:Wine regions of Ontario
- Category:Women in Ontario
- Category:Women in Ontario politics
- Category:Women MPPs in Ontario
