= OSSN =

OSSN may refer to:

- Ocular surface squamous neoplasia, a cancer of the eye
- Ontario Social Safety Network, a social activist organization in the Canadian province of Ontario
