= Tubby Schmalz =

Canadian ice hockey administrator (1916–1981)

- Born: Clarence Vincent Schmalz; December 19, 1916; Breslau, Ontario, Canada
- Died: December 7, 1981 (aged 64); Walkerton, Ontario, Canada
- Education: St. Jerome's College
- Occupations: Hotelier and politician
- Known for: Ontario Hockey Association president, Ontario Major Junior Hockey League commissioner, Canadian Amateur Hockey Association chairman
- Awards: OHA life member CAHA Order of Merit
- Honours: Clarence Schmalz Cup

Clarence Vincent "Tubby" Schmalz (December 19, 1916 – December 7, 1981) was a Canadian ice hockey administrator. He served as vice-president of the Western Ontario Athletic Association from 1940 to 1950, and coached and managed the senior ice hockey team in Walkerton, Ontario. He was elected to the Ontario Hockey Association executive (OHA) in 1956, and served as its president from 1969 to 1972. He was the first commissioner of the Ontario Major Junior Hockey League (OMJHL), serving from 1974 to 1978. He became vice-chairman of the Canadian Amateur Hockey Association (CAHA) in 1979, and was elected its chairman in 1981. He was a graduate of St. Jerome's College, and operated the Hartley House hotel in Walkerton. He served on the Walkerton Town Council for 17 years, including three years as reeve from 1979 to 1981.

Schmalz began the practice of referee and coach clinics in the OHA, and assisted in development of the National Coaches Certification Program in Canada. He was instrumental during junior ice hockey restructuring that saw Ontario's top tier of hockey evolve into the OHA Major Junior A Series and subsequently into the OMJHL. He implemented a revised player contract to recuperate costs of developing players for professional leagues, and oversaw academic standards which included the league paying tuition for the players' education. His tenure included multiple lawsuits to defend the interests of junior hockey against the World Hockey Association. He brought the OMJHL into the same umbrella organization with junior leagues from Western Canada and Quebec, to establish the Canadian Major Junior Hockey League in 1975. His career was recognized with life membership in the OHA, and the Order of Merit from the CAHA. He was posthumously made the namesake of the Clarence Schmalz Cup by the OHA in 1982.

== Early life and business career ==
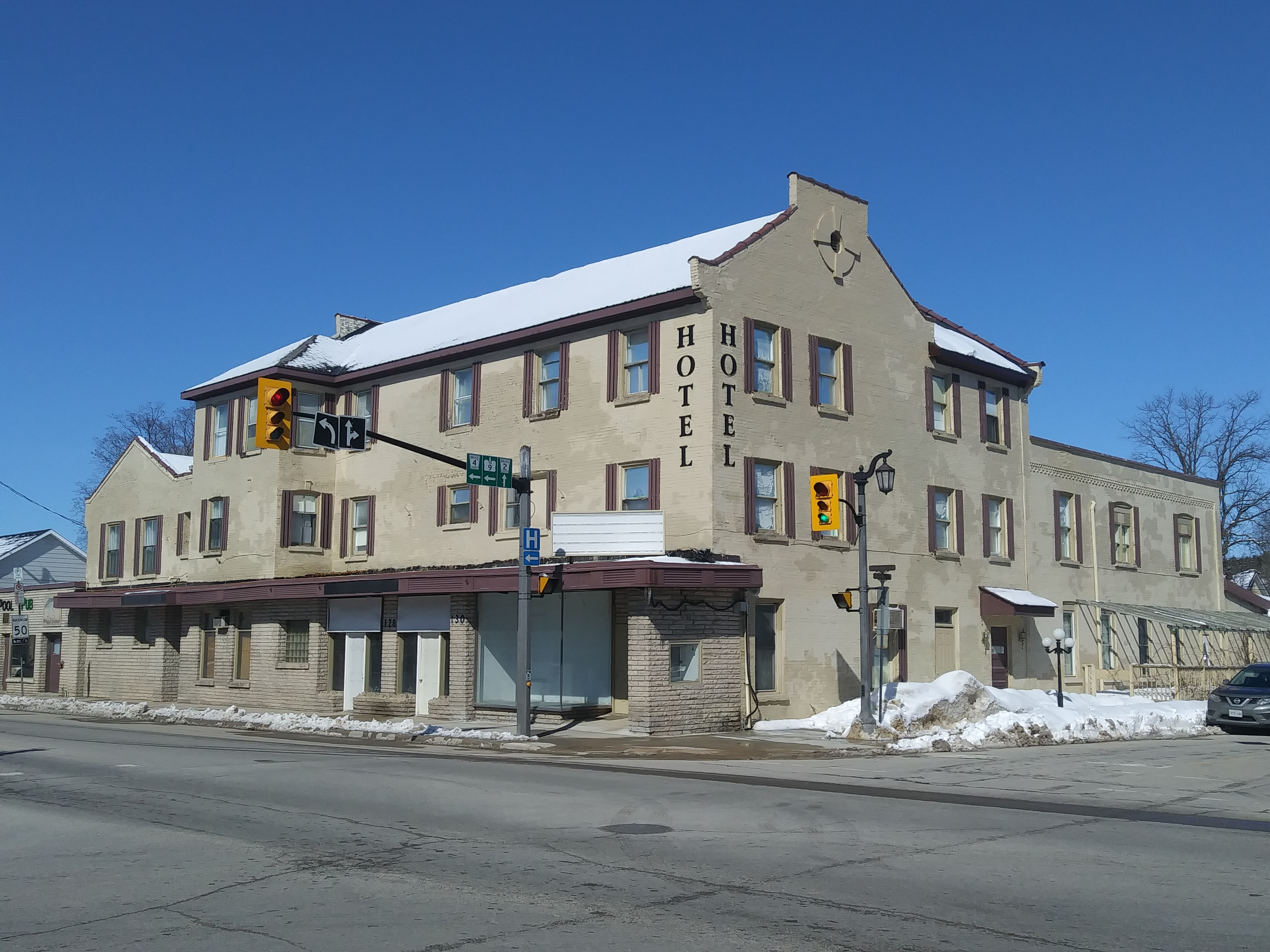
Hartley House hotel

Schmalz was born on December 19, 1916, in Breslau, Ontario. He was one of eight children to Charles Schmalz and Alice Rhinehart, in a family of four boys and four girls. (Note: The surname of Alice is spelled variously as Rhinehart and Reinhart.) He played hockey as a youth, and was a stick boy for the Preston Riversides. He played three seasons of junior ice hockey while at school in Kitchener, followed by one season in Brantford. He graduated from St. Jerome's College then went into his father's hotel business.

The family moved to Walkerton, Ontario in 1939, to establish a hotel business. Schmalz and his brother Lorne owned and operated the Hartley House hotel. Schmalz was the head chef at Hartley House, and won several culinary awards. He later served as president of the Ontario Hotel Sales Management Association.

== Early sporting career ==
Schmalz became a hockey coach and a team manager in the 1939–40 season. He served as vice-president of the Western Ontario Athletic Association (WOAA) from 1940 to 1950, which oversaw the WOAA Senior Hockey League. He and his brother used Hartley House to sponsor an intermediate softball team that won four consecutive Ontario Amateur Softball Association championships in the 1950s. Schmalz operated an intermediate senior ice hockey team named the Walkerton Capitols during the 1950s. His team had a local rivalry with the Durham Huskies, and he reportedly sheltered visiting teams in his hotel during inclement weather. He coached and managed the Walkerton Capitols team that were provincial champions during the 1954–55 season.

Schmalz was elected as a director of the Ontario Hockey Association (OHA) in 1956, and remained with the OHA until 1978. He used Hartley House as his office for hockey business, and occasionally hosted OHA executive meetings there.

== Political career ==
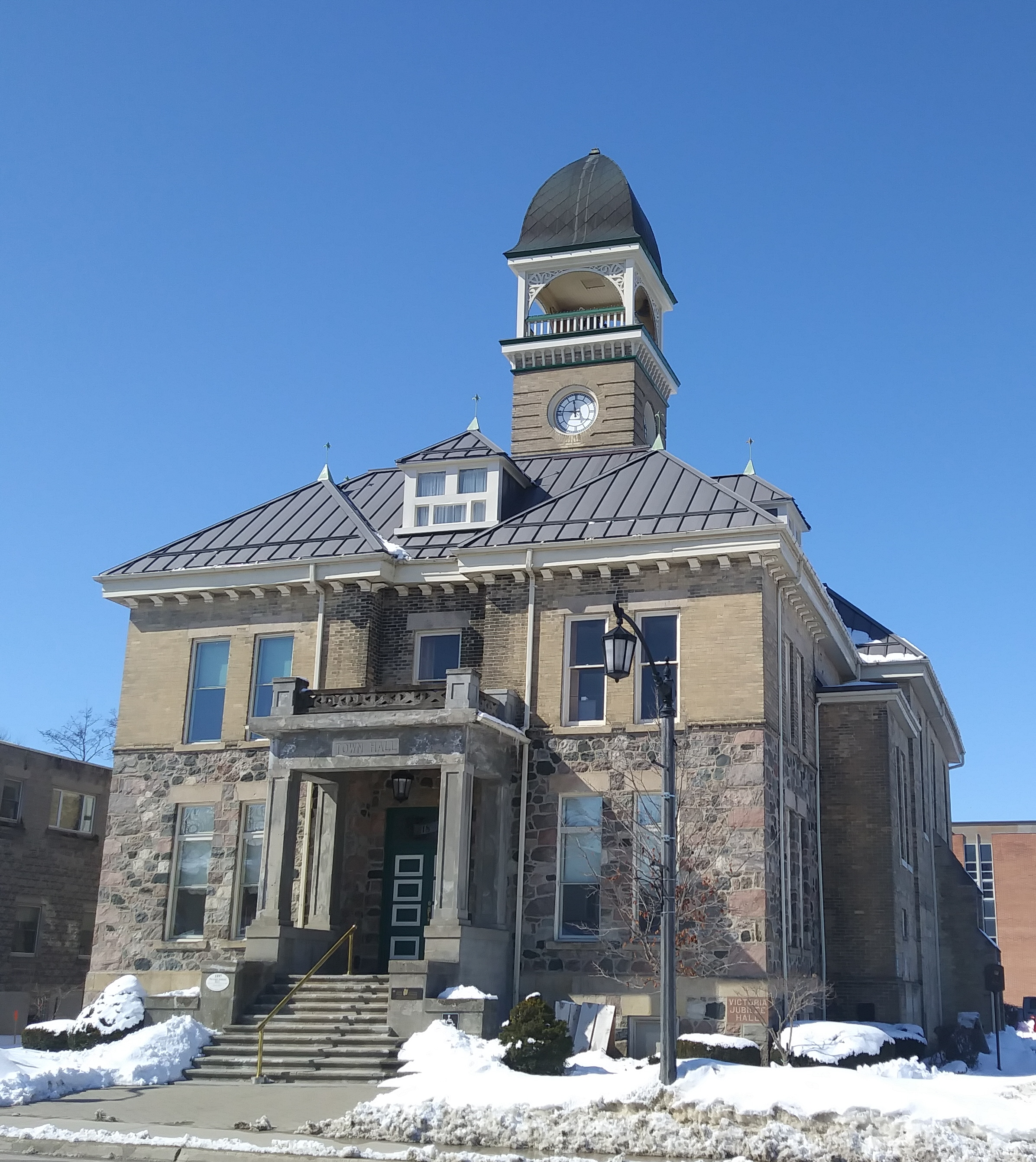
Walkerton Town Hall

Schmalz was elected to Walkerton Town Council in 1965, then served continuously on the council for 17 years. He was the deputy reeve for Walkerton from 1965 to 1967, and also represented Walkerton on the Bruce County Council. He later served as chairman of the town's finance committee, chairman of the recreation and community centres committee, and was elected president of the Chamber of commerce in Walkerton.

He was elected reeve in 1979, and served until 1981. He sat on several committees, including the legislative and resolutions committee, the industrial committee, and the planning board. During this time, he was chairman of Walkerton's business improvement association, and was the town's representative on the Bruce County Council.

== OHA president ==
Schmalz served as president of the OHA from 1969 to 1972, succeeding Jack Devine. During the summer in 1970, Junior A hockey leagues in Canada were reorganized into Tier 1 and Tier 2. Schmalz was instrumental during the changes which saw the Tier 1 division become the OHA Major Junior A Series.

Schmalz was concerned with the level of physical play during the 1970–71 OHA season, and personally interviewed four players to dissuade them from further on-ice misconduct. He submitted recommendations to the 1971 Canadian Amateur Hockey Association (CAHA) general meeting on behalf of the OHA to reduce the curvature of the hockey stick to one half inch for player safety. He also suggest to revert to the rectangular goal crease from the recent change to a semi-circle, since some rinks in his league were used by professional teams who used the old rules for the goal crease. Schmalz wanted to see consistency the application of the rules, and raise the standards for the level of instruction given to players. He instituted referee and coach clinics in the OHA, prior to it being mandated at the national level. In 1971, he sought to hire a technical director to conduct coaching and refereeing clinics across the province.

The Memorial Cup trophy is awarded to the team winning the Canadian junior championship.

Schmalz announced that teams from the OHA and the Quebec Major Junior Hockey League (QMJHL) would not play against any team from the Western Canada Hockey League (WCHL) for the 1971 Memorial Cup, due to disagreements over travel allowances given to team at the Memorial Cup and the higher number of over-age players allowed on WCHL rosters. He said that plans for an Eastern Canada series for the George Richardson Memorial Trophy would go ahead. As of the OHA playoffs, he reiterated that teams were still unanimous in their decision not to play for the Memorial Cup against WCHL teams. The Quebec Remparts won the Eastern Canada series, and ultimately accepted the challenge by the Western Canada champion Edmonton Oil Kings for the Memorial Cup.

In June 1971, Schmalz stated that the OHA had no plans to participate in the next Memorial Cup. Differences in the rules with the WCHL were resolved and the format for the 1972 Memorial Cup was subsequently changed from an Eastern Canada versus Western Canada final, into a round-robin format involving the champions of the WCHL, OHA Major Junior A Series and QMJHL.

In response to criticism in a 1971 Government of Canada report that junior hockey took advantage of young players, Schmalz stated that its teams paid as much as C$1,000 towards tuition for education and its players achieve higher grades than average students. He stated that the OHA provides a tutor to players struggling as students, and tuition payments are continued even if a player is traded to a new team. He felt that criticism on financial compensation was unfair, since the Government of Ontario threatened to place a 10 per cent amusement tax on all tickets sold, if the league did not agree that a weekly maximum stipend given to players for expenses.

Schmalz was succeeded by Frank Doherty as OHA president in May 1972. Schmalz remained active with the OHA as its past-president. He predicted that the Quebec Amateur Hockey Association would withdraw from CAHA in the upcoming years due to ongoing disagreements with the CAHA and the OHA. He stated the QAHA refusal to allow the Montreal Junior Canadiens to continue playing in the OHA, and the attempt to force Rouyn-Noranda teams out of the Northern Ontario Hockey Association and into the QAHA as reasons.

== OMJHL commissioner ==
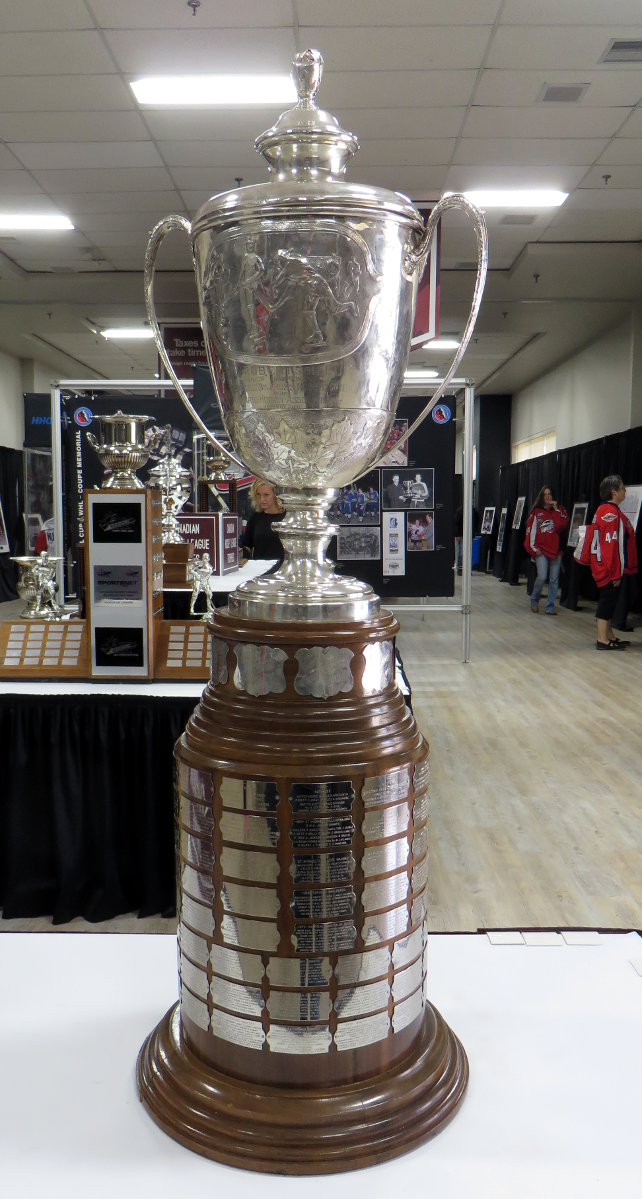
The J. Ross Robertson Cup was the championship trophy of the OMJHL.

The OHA Major Junior A Series was rebranded as the Ontario Major Junior Hockey League (OMJHL) in 1974. The league began operating semi-autonomously from the OHA, and later became fully independent. Schmalz was appointed the first commissioner of the OMJHL on September 23, 1974.

=== 1974–75 season ===
Schmalz set about to implement a revised mandatory player contract. It included a clause in which 20 per cent of a player's earnings during his first three professional seasons would go back to the junior clubs to recuperate development costs. He explained that the clause was a result of Mark Howe and Marty Howe both departing in the summer for the Houston Aeros, and there was nothing in the OHA junior contract to cover development payments by professional teams. The new clause was a basis for potential legal action against the World Hockey Association (WHA) which had not made payments to the CAHA or OHA.

Schmalz confirmed in January 1975, that development payments from the National Hockey League (NHL) were coming, and that the WHA was holding a meeting in February to discuss the issue. WCHL president Ed Chynoweth said his league's governors agreed to withdraw from the CAHA if the payment issue was not resolved, and foretold the possibility of Canada's three major junior leagues banding together under one umbrella. The NHL and WHA were delinquent in $600,000 in payments as per the existing professional-amateur agreement. The Winnipeg Free Press reported that the WCHL was negotiating a separate deal with the WHA for development fees, and the WCHL would break away from the CAHA after the 1975 Memorial Cup. Schmalz was angered at the report and called for the three major junior league to remain unified.

In February 1975, the NHL and the WHA agreed to stop drafting underage junior players. Mark Napier of the Toronto Marlboros who was not drafted, signed a professional contract with the Toronto Toros later that month to take effect in the following season. Schmalz stated he would seek legal advice on the matter, with the possibility of suspending Napier for the remainder of the junior season. During a game against the Marlboros, St. Catharines Black Hawks owner Hap Emms ordered his players to wear their jerseys backwards and play with their sticks upside down in protest of Napier's contract. Schmalz later ruled Napier eligible to play, and suspended Emms for the remainder of the season and fined him $1,000.

=== Founding the CMJHL ===
On May 9, 1975, officials from the WCHL, the OMJHL and the QMJHL, announced a constitution to establish the Canadian Major Junior Hockey League (CMJHL) composed of the three league under one umbrella. The new organization wanted standard contracts for all players, consistent amounts for development fees, and for the NHL and the WHA to work together on a common drafting program to eliminate bidding wars. The CMJHL sought to represent players directly instead of agents, and proposed an escalating development fee schedule if professional teams wanted to sign a player while he was still eligible for junior hockey. The league also proposed to allow some players under professional contracts to continue playing in junior hockey. Schmalz defended the validity of the constitution, despite a challenge from Alan Eagleson that it violated antitrust laws in Canada and the United States.

=== 1975–76 season ===
In November 1975, Schmalz decreed that future OMJHL games were to be attended by least two off-duty police officers as a deterrent to violence on ice or among the spectators. The statement was in response to incidents from a game involving the London Knights and the St. Catharines Black Hawks. The Toronto Marlboros played an exhibition game against a Soviet Union all-star senior league team in December 1975. Schmalz stated after the event, that OHA teams would avoid exhibition games against senior teams touring Canada, but welcomed games against junior teams. Problems in getting development payments from professional leagues continued, and Schmalz announced the possibility of legal action to recover delinquent fees for drafting junior-aged players.

=== 1976–77 season ===
Schmalz filed legal action against the WHA on behalf of the OMJHL in 1976, citing failure to pay development fees for junior-aged players Paul Heaver and Bob Russell who turned professional. Schmalz also said legal action to receive payments would be likely for a third player, John Tonelli. Schmalz later announced that an OMJHL team would represent Canada at the 1977 World Junior Ice Hockey Championships, and that the league would operate a small tournament within its schedule to choose the representative.

=== 1977–78 season ===
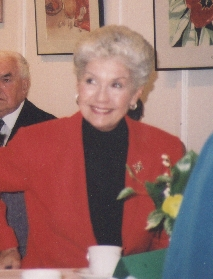
Iona Campagnolo

Hosting duties for the Memorial Cup rotated among the three constituent leagues of the CMJHL, since its founding in 1975. Schmalz announced that two Northern Ontario cities were chosen by the OMJHL to co-host the 1978 Memorial Cup in Sudbury and Sault Ste. Marie.

In February 1978, Iona Campagnolo, the Minister of State of Fitness and Amateur Sport released a report which claimed that junior hockey functioned in the best interests of professional hockey instead of the players. Schmalz said that the CMJHL would welcome a study into its player development programs, if given a say on selecting the inquiry members. He stated an inquiry would reveal that the CMJHL was doing its best for the welfare of the players. He highlighted its academic standards, and stated that the OMJHL fined players who missed classes, suspended players who did not keep up with the workload.

The CMJHL expressed frustration with the 1978 WHA Amateur Draft being held during the junior season and four months earlier than the 1978 NHL Amateur Draft. The league was concerned that its players would be pursued for professional contracts while playing junior hockey, despite the names of drafted players not being released. The league considered having the CAHA use its International Ice Hockey Federation membership as leverage to block WHA exhibition games against international teams and force the WHA to negotiate. In May 1978, Schmalz stated that the continued signing of junior-aged players by the WHA would mean forfeiture of a $150,000 bond paid as a promise not to sign players before November.

=== 1978–79 season ===
Schmalz stated in July 1978, that the demise of the WHA would be the best situation for junior hockey. He hoped for government intervention to protect the CMJHL after the results of the inquiry into junior hockey were made public. He stated that the NHL had abided by verbal agreement not to sign junior players, but the WHA continued to target juniors for talent, and referred to the recent signing of 16-year-old Wayne Gretzky to a contract. Schmalz contemplated legal action against Alan Eagleson and Birmingham Bulls owner John F. Bassett, for signing of junior-aged players under contract. Bassett felt that since players were 18 years old, they could be signed to a contract under Canadian laws. The lawsuit against Eagleson and the Birmingham Bulls was announced in September 1978, on behalf of the London Knights and the Sault Ste. Marie Greyhounds, and sued for "inducing breach of contract and wrongfully interfering with contractual relations".

In November 1978, the OMJHL transitioned from the current part-time role into a full-time commissioner's role. Schmalz retired as of December 15, 1978, and was succeeded by Bill Beagan who had been commissioner of the International Hockey League.

== CAHA executive ==
The CAHA restructured from an elected president in 1979, to a full-time paid president with an elected board of governors. Schmalz was elected vice-chairman of the CAHA's board of directors on May 24, 1979. He was elected chairman of the CAHA's board of directors on May 28, 1981, and stated his main goal for the CAHA was financial solvency. Upon his election as chairman, he had attended 26 consecutive CAHA general meetings. He also built upon the coach instruction clinics from his time with the OHA, and assisted in development of the National Coaches Certification Program. Schmalz's tenure as chairman lasted less than seventh months, and he was succeeded by the past-chairman, Frank McKinnon.

== Personal life ==
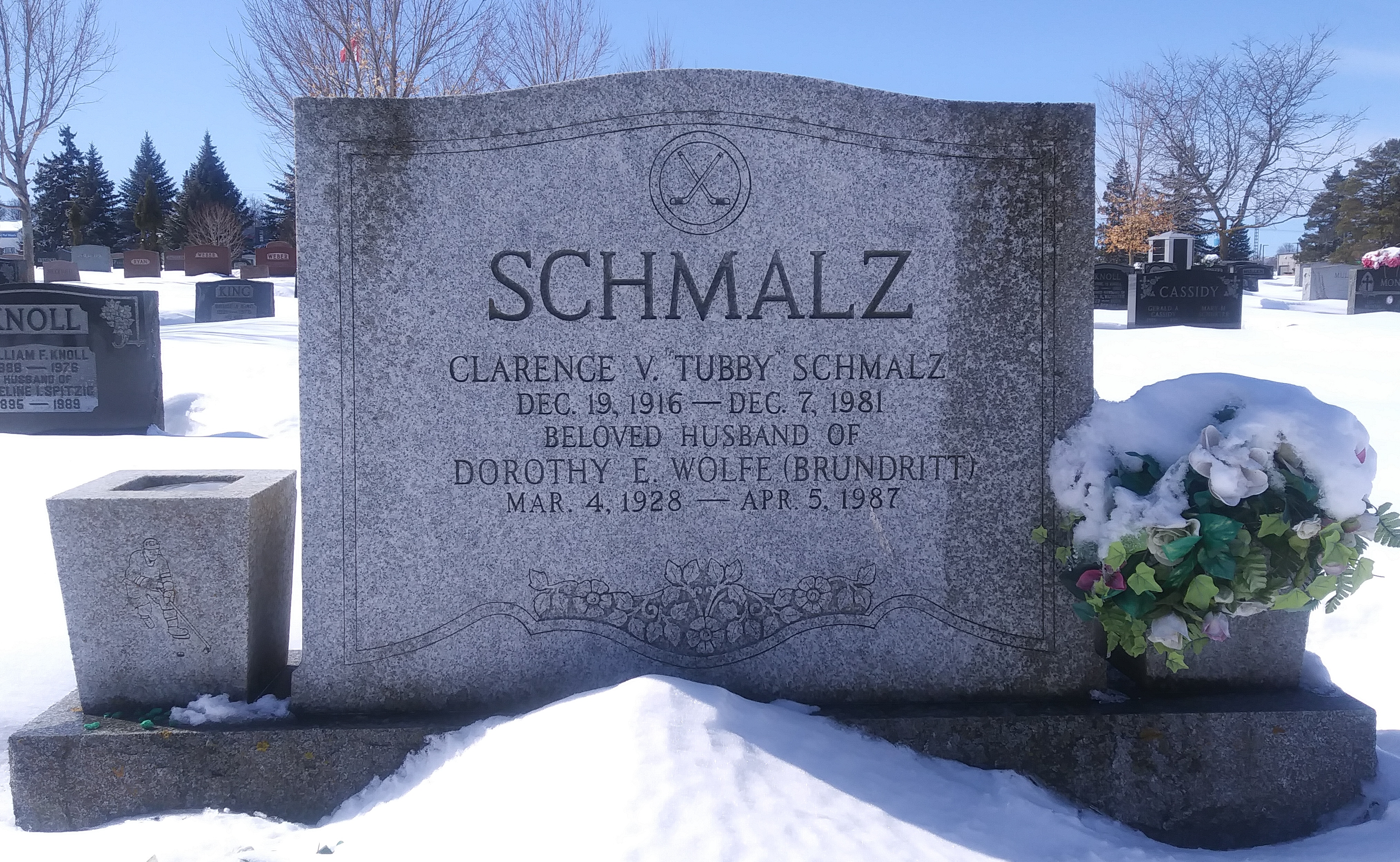
Schmalz's gravestone in Calvary Cemetery

Schmalz was nicknamed Tubby due to his physical size. Despite it being politically incorrect, he embraced the nickname and regularly introduced himself with it. He married Dorothy Wolfe Brundritt on December 2, 1969, with whom he had one daughter and three step-daughters. He was a member of the Sacred Heart Roman Catholic Church in Walkerton, and the local Knights of Columbus. He was an amateur ceramic artist and had his own kiln at home.

Schmalz went on a deer hunting excursion on Manitoulin Island in November 1981 and returned home feeling ill. He died at home in Walkerton, Ontario, on December 7, 1981, due to a massive heart attack. He was interred at Calvary Cemetery in Walkerton, and his pallbearers were colleagues from hockey his career, including Murray Costello and Bill Long.

== Honours and legacy ==
Schmalz received the OHA Gold Stick award in 1977, in recognition of a career of service to ice hockey in Ontario, and was made a life member of the OHA in 1978. He received the Order of Merit from the CAHA in 1979, in recognition of contributions to hockey in Canada. He was made the namesake of the Clarence Schmalz Cup 1982, awarded to the Junior C champion of the OHA. A commemorative trophy case for Schmalz was later installed in the lobby of the Walkerton Community Centre. Since 2014, the Clarence Schmalz Cup is awarded to the Provincial Junior Hockey League champion.

When Schmalz died in 1981, he was remembered by Ontario Hockey League commissioner David Branch who stated, "He created the base from which the league has been working. He brought respect and dignity to the OMJHL".

== Bibliography ==
- Lapp, Richard M.; Macaulay, Alec (1997). The Memorial Cup: Canada's National Junior Hockey Championship. Madeira Park, British Columbia: Harbour Publishing. ISBN 1-55017-170-4.
- Ferguson, Bob (2005). Who's Who in Canadian Sport, Volume 4. Markham, Ontario: Fitzhenry & Whiteside Ltd. ISBN 1-55041-855-6.
- Young, Scott (1989). 100 Years of Dropping the Puck. Toronto, Ontario: McClelland & Stewart Inc. ISBN 0-7710-9093-5.
- Constitution, By-laws, Regulations, History. Gloucester, Ontario: Canadian Amateur Hockey Association. May 1990.
