= Reactions to Boycott, Divestment and Sanctions =

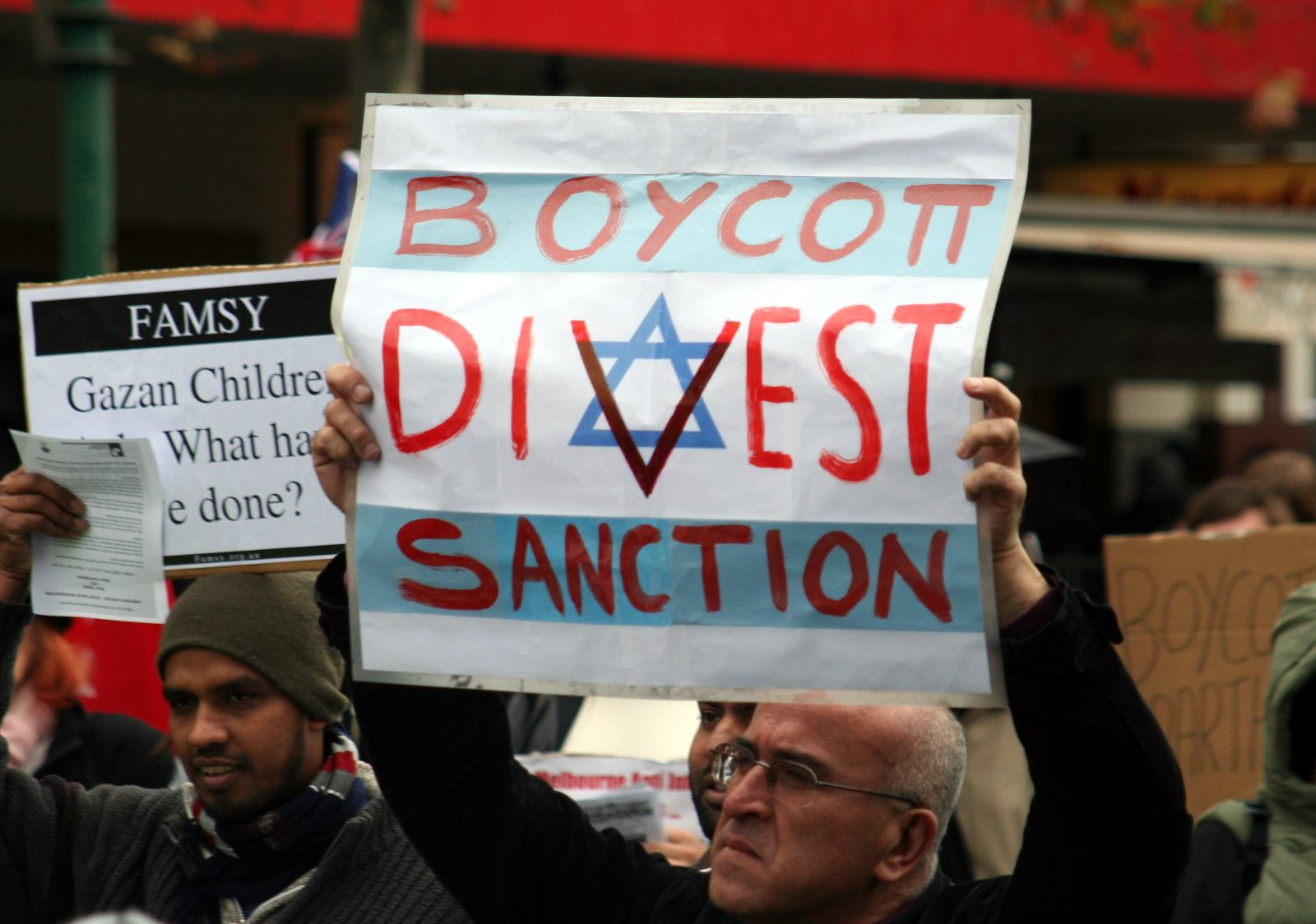
BDS protest in Melbourne, Australia against Israel's Gaza Blockade and attack on humanitarian flotilla in 2010

Reactions to the BDS movement have been polarized.

Supporters of BDS compare the movement to the 20th-century anti-apartheid movement and view their actions similar to the boycotts of South Africa during its apartheid era, comparing the situation in Israel to apartheid.

Critics of the movement, such as Elhanan Yakira, Ethan Felson, and Roberta Rosenthal Kwall, have argued that BDS is a campaign motivated by anti-Zionism and anti-Israel sentiment. Executive vice chairman of the Conference of Presidents of Major American Jewish Organizations Malcolm Hoenlein called BDS a "'politically correct' form of anti-Semitism."

== Australia ==
=== Support ===
In 2011, a series of protests were staged at Max Brenner outlets, a franchise of the Israeli food manufacturer Strauss Group, which provides soldiers in the Israeli Defence Forces with care packages.

The NSW Greens State Conference prior to the 2011 NSW State Election adopted a resolution in support of BDS. In support of the statement, Senator Lee Rhiannon said it was "motivated by the universal principles of freedom, justice and equal rights" and also "I see the value of that tactic as a way to promoting Palestinian human rights." Following the election, Federal leader Bob Brown said that he had conveyed his disapproval of this policy emphasis to Rhiannon.

In December 2011, the NSW Greens reviewed their support for the BDS campaign against Israel, bringing the branch more closely in line with the federal Greens Party position. However, they did vote to support BDS as a "legitimate political tactic". Rhiannon said that this was not a defeat, but rather, "The resolution recognizes the legitimacy of the BDS as a political tactic."

=== Oppose ===
In October 2011, Izzat Abdulhadi, head of the General Delegation of Palestine to Australia said that he is against the "full-scale" BDS campaign, and condemned the occasionally violent protests at the Max Brenner stores in Australia, saying, "BDS is a non-violent process and I don't think it's the right of anybody to use BDS as a violent action or to prevent people from buying from any place."

In New South Wales in 2011, Walt Secord of the Labor Party's NSW Legislative Council, called on the NSW Minister for Police, Michael Gallacher, to "provide assurances for the protection of businesses with Israeli links" after two BDS protesters were arrested outside a Max Brenner store. Also in New South Wales, on 19 April 2011, Marrickville municipal council held a fiery meeting over whether to support the global BDS campaign. Though they struck down the motion, one councillor went on record hoping Israelis and Palestinians could "live in peace in the future without Marrickville Council trying to interfere".

In August 2012, Liberal MP David Southwick said in parliament that Labor MP Martin Foley had links to BDS group through union membership. Foley responded by saying "I seek his withdrawal of these comments where he has sought to associate [me] with this racist, anti-Semitic and anti-Israel boycott movement."

Following the incident, Prime Minister Julia Gillard said that the "campaign does not serve the cause of peace and diplomacy for agreement on a two-state solution between Israel and Palestine", and added that Australia has always had firm opposition to the BDS movement. Others, including former Prime Minister Kevin Rudd, also condemned the protests in a follow-up article by the Australian discussing protests at the University of New South Wales.

Representing the Coalition prior to the 2013 federal election, Liberal Party deputy leader Julie Bishop reaffirmed Gillard's stance by promising to cut off federal grants for individuals and institutions who support the BDS campaign. On 29 May 2013, Jewish Australian academics Andrew Benjamin, Michele Grossman, and David Goodman condemned the Coalition's election promise as "an anti-democratic gesture par excellence".

== Canada ==
=== Support ===
The most visible face of organizing in support of BDS in Canada is Israeli Apartheid Week, originally started in Toronto in 2005. The United Church of Canada voted to boycott products from Israeli settlements. In March 2014, the University of Windsor Student Alliance is considering plans to implement the results of a referendum vote in which the majority of voters called for the university to boycott companies with ties to Israel.

In Québec the political party Québec solidaire, the second largest public sector union Centrale des syndicats du Québec and the feminist organization Fédération des femmes du Québec have all supported the BDS campaign. Amir Khadir has sponsored a petition to the National Assembly of Quebec calling for the suspension of Québec's cooperation accord with Israel.

In 2006, the Canadian Union of Public Employees voted to join the boycott of Israel "until that state recognizes the Palestinian right to self-determination" and "until Israel meets its obligation to recognize the Palestinian people's inalienable right to self-determination and fully complies with the precepts of international law".

According to the Canadian academics Abigail Bakan and Yasmeen Abu-Laban, the BDS campaign has been important in contesting what they describe as "the hegemonic framing of Israel as a victim state in the face of Palestinian 'terrorism'."

=== Oppose ===
In February 2011, the Québec National Assembly voted against a motion that condemned boycotts of Québec businesses that sell products made in Israel and "reiterates Québec's support for the understanding on co-operation between the government of Québec and the government of the State of Israel, which was signed in Jerusalem in 1997 and renewed in 2007".

== Ireland ==
Dublin's City Council passed two resolutions on 9 April 2018 endorsing the BDS movement that included a motion to boycott Hewlett Packard (HP) goods, for its complicity concerning Israeli occupation. In doing so, it became the first European capital to endorse BDS.

== Israel ==
=== Support ===
An Israeli activist group launched in 2009 to support BDS from within Israel. It concentrates on cultural boycott by appealing to international personalities, artists and academics who consider visiting Israel.

The "Who Profits?" project is another Israeli group involved in the BDS campaign that documents and publicizes how profits are made from the Israeli occupation of the Palestinian territories, including documentation of who benefits from the occupation. According to "Who Profits?", both Israeli and international corporations are involved "in the construction of Israeli colonies and infrastructure in the Occupied Territories, in settlements' economy, in building walls and checkpoints, in the supply of specific equipment used in the control and repression of civilian population under occupation".

=== Oppose ===
A group of Israeli businessmen have started a sales website called "Shop-a-Fada" in order to promote Israeli products. Tal Brody is the honorary chairman of the initiative and said the purpose is to "fight back against those who think that they'll be able to destroy Israel by waging economic warfare".

Some Jewish factory managers who employ Palestinian labor have condemned the boycott, claiming a boycott of Israeli products will result in the loss of Palestinian jobs.

== The Netherlands ==
The lower house of the Dutch Parliament passed a motion on 18 March 2014 undermining the concept of BDS. It came in response to the support of BDS by water company Vitens. Kees van der Staaij of the Reformed Political Party and Joel Voordewind of the ChristianUnion jointly submitted the motion. It calls on the government "to indicate in a visible and convincing way that it encourages relations between Dutch and Israeli businesses and institutions" because "economic cooperation promotes peace, security, stability in the region." It passed by a large majority.

== Romania ==
Claiming "respect for international law, the positions of the EU and the protection of Romanian citizens", Romania announced in 2012 that it will not allow Romanian labourers to be sent to Israel unless guarantees are provided that they will not be employed in construction projects in the West Bank. Commenting on the refusal to grant this condition for Romanian workers, Israeli MK Michal Rozin stated that "Israelis are being harmed by the government's activity in the territories."

== South Africa ==
The University of Johannesburg has issued conflicting stances toward BDS. In 2011, it voted not to renew a joint agreement with Israel's Ben-Gurion University for research in biotechnology and water purification. A campaign before the vote cited BGU's cooperation with the military, occupation and apartheid. The vote did not preclude faculty members from individually choosing to continue in the joint project. However, two days after the vote, Vice Chancellor Ihron Rensburg, a principal of UJ, stated that "UJ is not part of an academic boycott of Israel. ... It has never been UJ's intention to sever all ties with BGU, although it may have been the intention of some UJ staff members."

On 31 August 2012, the Wits University Students' Representative Council (Wits SRC) adopted a declaration of academic and cultural boycott of Israel. Several days later, the executive committee of Wits Convocation, representing the alumni and academic staff of the university, distanced itself from the declaration. The South African Union of Jewish Students, sharply criticized the resolution, calling it "a vicious and one-sided resolution aimed at shutting down all debate and discussion surrounding the Israeli–Palestinian conflict".

In March 2013, eleven student BDS supporters at the Wits University were charged by the university after they forced the cancellation of a concert by Israeli pianist Yossi Reshef. They were subsequently sentenced by the university to community service. At a follow up concert held on 28 August 2013, which featured Israeli jazz saxophonist Daniel Zamir, dozens of BDS protesters gathered outside. Due to security measures implemented by the university, the protesters were unable to disrupt the performance, as they were kept from entering the venue. However, concert goers were subject to verbal abuse including the singing of a song that included the lyrics "Dubula iJuda" (Shoot the Jew), at as well as chants of "There is no such thing as Israel" and "Israel apartheid". Some attendees were also pelted with sheets of paper. The actions of the protesters were condemned by University Vice-Chancellor Adam Habib and by the South African Jewish Board of Deputies. Muhammed Desai, coordinator of BDS South Africa later went on to justify the actions. Several days later, however, BDS released an official statement condemning the chants of "dubula ijuda". Desai was later called on to resign by BDS supporters.

On 8 March 2015, outside a South African Zionist Federation event, BDS supporters staged a protest at which protesters threatened to kill Jews. They chanted antisemitic slogans such as "You think this is Israel, we are going to kill you!" and "You Jews do not belong here in South Africa!" The picketers who were joined by members of the South African Communist Party also included the head of the ruling African National Congress (ANC)'s International Relations, Government Deputy Minister Obed Bapela who accused Israel of oppressing Palestinians. In another March 2015 event in South Africa, a mob of BDS supporters threw rocks, broke equipment, and looted a store that sells products from Israel.

== Spain ==
=== Municipalities ===
BDS has received a mixed reaction in Spain. In 2016, four Spanish municipalities passed pro-BDS policies, only to later drop the policies once it became apparent that they were inconsistent with Spain's anti-discrimination laws. Also in 2016, pro-BDS motions in five other Spanish municipalities were defeated.

In 2018, Navarre, a state in northern Spain, was the first to endorse the Boycott, Divestment, and Sanctions movement. It passed a motion that requested Spain "suspend its ties with Israel until the country ceases its policy of criminal repression of the Palestinian population."

Spain's third largest city, Valencia, passed a resolution to boycott Israeli citizens and companies. It declares that the city is "free of Israeli apartheid”, and calls for it to formally follow the BDS movement. A Spanish court found the resolution to be discriminatory and illegal a year later. It has since been annulled.

In August 2018, two Spanish municipalities rescinded their BDS motions, following legal action.

=== The Rototom Sunsplash and Matisyahu affair ===
The organizers of the week long Rototom Sunsplash music festival held in Spain from August 15 to 22nd 2015, cancelled the scheduled appearance of Jewish American rapper Matisyahu after he refused to sign a statement supporting a Palestinian state. Matisyahu stated that it was "appalling and offensive" that he was singled out as the "one publicly Jewish-American artist."

El País Spain's highest-circulation daily paper wrote "The decision by the organizers of the Rototom Sunsplash music festival in Benicássim to ban reggae singer Matisyahu from performing this Saturday is a serious case of religious and political discrimination. ... He is the only musician performing at Rototom, which is funded with public money, who has been demanded to make such a statement, and to make matters worse, he has been asked to do so solely on the grounds that he is Jewish".

After further criticism from the Spanish government as well as Jewish organisations, the organisers apologised to Matisyahu re-inviting him to perform on Saturday August 22. The organizers stated that "it made a mistake, due to the boycott and the campaign of pressure, coercion and threats employed by the BDS País Valencià."

== United Kingdom ==
On 22 April 2005, the Association of University Teachers (AUT) Council voted to boycott two Israeli universities: University of Haifa and Bar-Ilan University (the vote was held on Passover eve, which prevented most Jewish members of the AUT from participating in the process). The motions were prompted by calls Palestinian academics and others. Bar-Ilan was targeted for offering courses at Ariel College in the West Bank, and Haifa was targeted due to allegations—later retracted—that it had disciplined a lecturer for political reasons. After widespread criticism, AUT members secured a special meeting on 26 May 2005, which overturned the boycott on grounds of academic freedom, the need for dialogue, and the concern that Israel had been unfairly singled out. In 2006, the lecturers' union NATFHE passed a motion supporting boycotts of Israeli academics who did not distance themselves from "apartheid policies," but this motion lapsed after its merger with AUT.

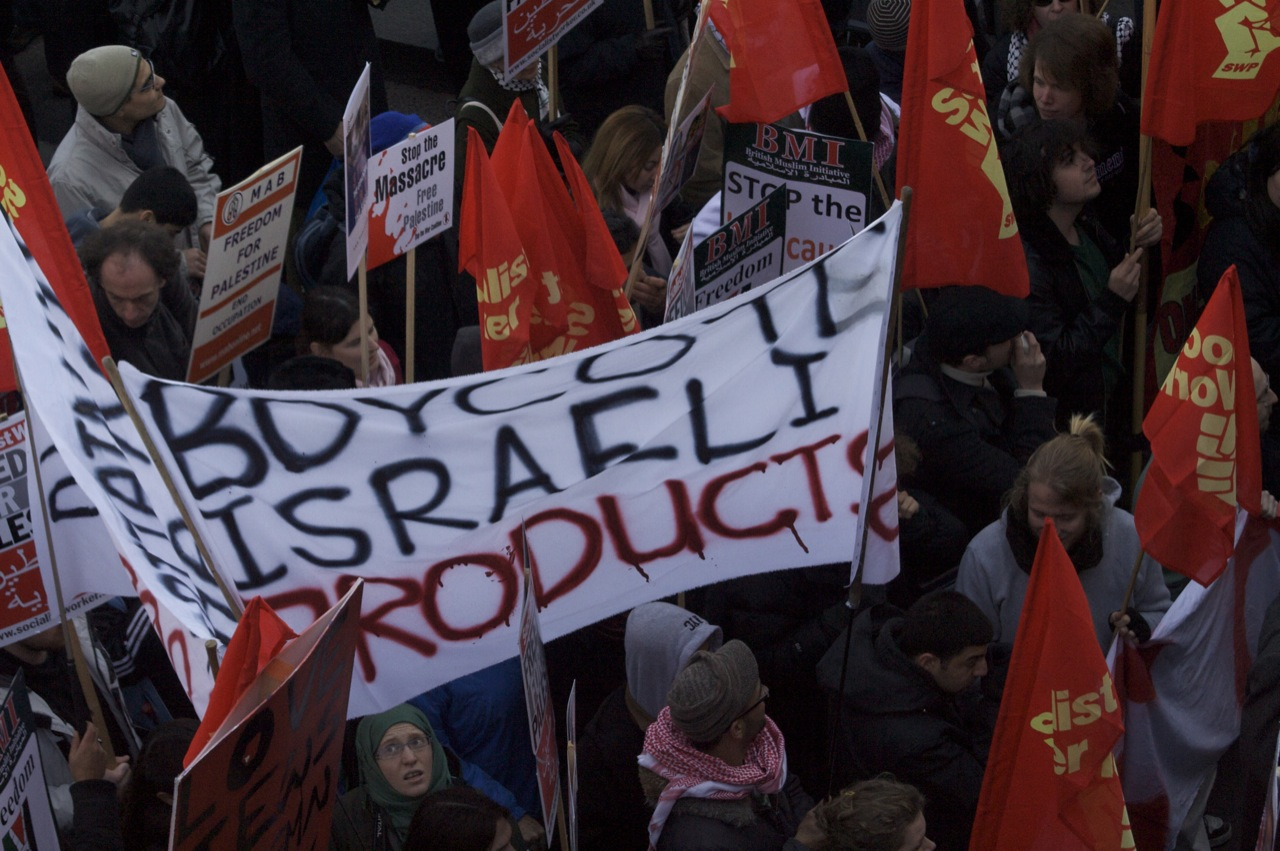
BDS supporters protesting in London. The poster reads, "Boycott Israeli Products".

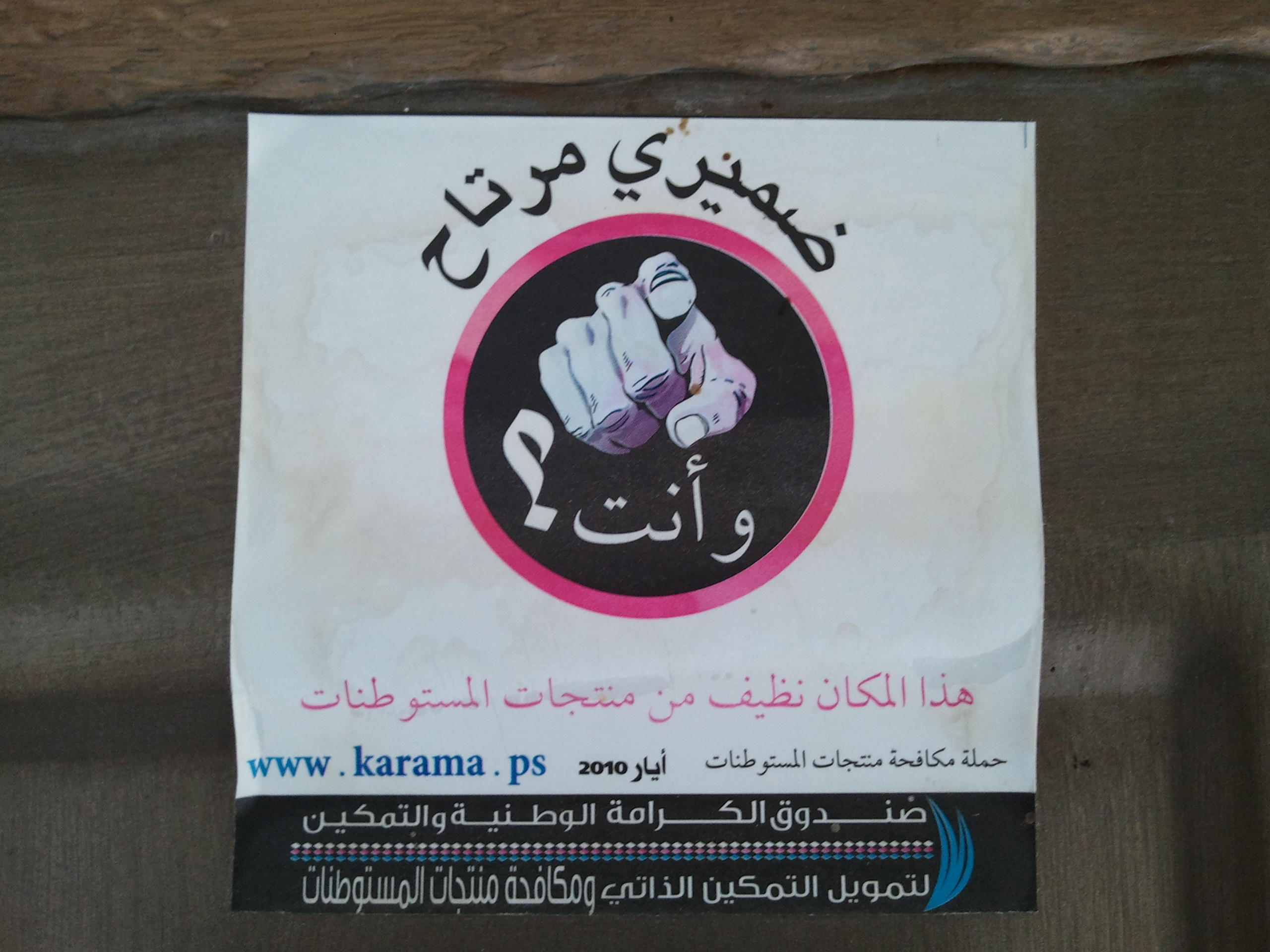
A sign on the front door of a Palestinian house that reads: "I have a clear conscience, do you? This home is free of products produced in Israeli settlements."

Subsequent UK activism included 2009 student protests against Israel’s actions in Gaza, leading Cardiff University to divest from BAE Systems, the removal of Israeli tourism ads from the London Underground, and Dexia bank ending services to West Bank settlements. The University and College Union passed a boycott resolution the same year, though its lawyers warned it was legally unenforceable. In 2014, Leicester City Council supported boycotts of settlement goods, joining Swansea and Gwynedd councils. A legal challenge by Jewish Human Rights Watch was dismissed, with the Court of Appeal affirming the motions criticized Israeli government policies but recognised Israel’s right to exist. Other actions included John Lewis dropping SodaStream products in 2014 amid protests, and then-London mayor Boris Johnson’s 2015 denunciation of boycotts as “so-called” measures promoted by “lefty academics,” followed by cancelled events in the West Bank. In 2016, the UK government introduced a procurement policy to prevent local boycotts, struck down in 2020 after a legal challenge by the Palestine Solidarity Campaign.

== United States ==
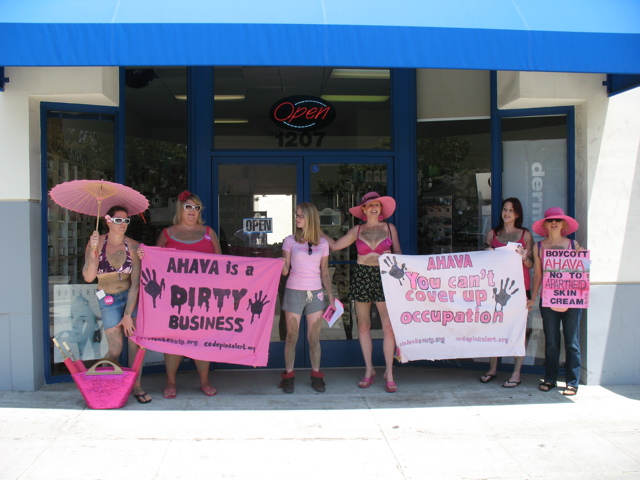
Activist group Code Pink in Los Angeles, supporting Israeli boycotts, specifically targeting Israeli-owned Ahava, for the company's factory in the occupied Palestinian West Bank

Noam Chomsky opposes the formal BDS movement, but supports certain aspects of boycotting Israel. The prominent activist for Palestinian human rights stated he supports the "boycott and divestment of firms that are carrying out operations in the occupied territories" but the current BDS movement's "hypocrisy rises to heaven". He stated that the BDS campaign harms the "whole movement. It harms the Palestinians and it is a gift to the Israeli hardliners and their American supporters", because the BDS's "hypocrisy is so transparent... why not boycott the United States?.. Israeli crimes [are] a fragment of US crimes, which are much worse". He also argued that the Palestinian people don't support boycotting Israel and that the BDS movement is run by "one man NGOs" who falsely claim to represent the Palestinian people. In the same interview, he also criticized BDS founder Omar Barghouti for advocating a full boycott of Israel, despite having studied at Tel Aviv University. Despite his disdain for the formal BDS movement, he was among the academics who lobbied Stephen Hawking to boycott an Israeli conference. In a subsequent letter to Artists for Palestine, Chomsky clarified his position, writing "I've been involved in activities to hold Israel accountable for its international law violations since before the BDS movement took shape. While I have some tactical differences with the BDS movement, I strongly support the actions and continue to participate in them".

Norman Finkelstein, a harsh critic of Israel's occupation of Palestinian territory, has also expressed an ambivalent attitude towards BDS. He has supported economic boycott of Israel and said that BDS has the "right tactics", but that it needs to be "explicit on its goal" and that "the goal has to include recognition of Israel, or it won't reach the public". He is hostile towards the BDS movement in its current form, labeling it a "hypocritical, dishonest cult" led by "dishonest gurus" who want to "selectively enforce the law" and try to cleverly pose as human rights activists, whereas their real goal is the destruction of Israel. In addition, he said: "I'm getting a little bit exasperated with what I think is a whole lot of nonsense. I'm not going to tolerate silliness, childishness and a lot of leftist posturing. I loathe the disingenuousness. We will never hear the solidarity movement [back a] two-state solution." Furthermore, Finkelstein stated that the BDS movement has had very few successes, and that like a cult, the leaders pretend that they are hugely successful when in reality the general public rejects their extreme views.

In December 2015, former U.S. Secretary of State Hillary Clinton said:

"As Secretary of State I called out systemic structural anti-Israel basis (Note: The word "basis" here is a mistake (probably a TYPO). The mistake is present in the original ["reliable"?] source, but it is still a mistake. (See the "ref" tag near the end of this paragraph, -- with "title=ISRAEL AND THE UNITED STATES: YESTERDAY, TODAY, AND TOMORROW" -- that contains a URL that includes the prescient phrase "uncorrected-transcript". That "transcript" is indeed "uncorrected".) The correct word here would have been "bias".) at the UN and fought to block the one sided Goldstone report particularly at a time when antisemitism is on the rise across the world especially in Europe. We need to repudiate efforts to malign and undermine Israel and the Jewish people. The boycott, divestment and sanctions movement known as BDS is the latest front in this battle. Demonizing Israeli scientists and intellectuals, even young students, comparing Israel to South African apartheid, now no nation is above criticism. But this is wrong and it should stop immediately. Some proponents of BDS may hope that pressuring Israel may lead to peace. Well that's wrong too."

=== Organizational response ===
In 2010, the Industrial Workers of the World became the first union in the United States to endorse the BDS campaign.

On December 4, 2014, a chapter of US Student-Workers Union at University of California voted to support the BDS campaign.

In 2015 donor Sheldon Adelson launched Maccabee Task Force, an anti-BDS organization that operates on college campuses.

In January 2016 the General Board of Pension and Health Benefits, the United Methodist Church's investment agency, announced that it would no longer invest in Israel's five main banks since they did not meet their standards for sustainable investment. In February 2016, the General Assembly of the Presbyterian Church(USA) was lobbied by its Advisory Committee on Social Witness Policy (ACSWP) to lay aside a quest for a two state solution and support BDS. This was described as a "one-sided, zero-sum solution", by Presbyterians for Middle East Peace.

In October 2016, BDS advocate Roger Waters lost $4 million in sponsorship after American Express refused to fund his North America tour due to his anti-Israel rhetoric at a previous festival. In November 2016, Citibank joined American Express in cutting ties to Waters.

=== Academic response ===
"In 2007, some 300 university presidents denounced BDS as inimical to the academic spirit" and as of 2012, "[n]o American university has divested from Israel and prominent campus presidents have said they would oppose such efforts." University of Pennsylvania President Amy Gutmann said in January 2012 that the university "has clearly stated on numerous occasions that it does not support sanctions or boycotts against Israel". She said that the school was not a sponsor of a BDS conference taking place on campus in February 2012.

In January 2012, The Forward published an article about Jewish presidents of universities, saying that "many college presidents" see BDS as a "red line" and "presidents who were previously disinclined to speak out against anti-Israel activity on campus in the name of preserving open dialogue found themselves publicly opposing the movement."

As of 2015, student governments at six of the 10 University of California (UC) system schools (Berkeley, Irvine, Riverside, San Diego, Santa Cruz, and UCLA) have passed resolutions calling for their schools to divest themselves of their investments in Israel. The UC Student Association passed resolutions calling for the UC Board of Regents not only to boycott Israel, but also to boycott the United States and several other countries. The Board of Regents stated it will disregard any students' resolutions for divestment. In response to this, Herbert London, president of the London Center for Policy Research, wrote University of California President Janet Napolitano, urging her to promote Israel and get personally involved in the debate at UC system schools about divesting themselves of investments in Israel.

Omri Boehm argued in the Los Angeles Review of Books that "a boycott on Israeli academics is an obvious form of a violent political action".

During the mid-2010s, BDS efforts were largely obstructed. International academic conferences continued in Israel and Israeli academics were invited to international academic conferences abroad with BDS having no noticeable effect. Furthermore, according to American studies professor Thomas Doherty of Brandeis University, the highly public reputation-destroying results of BDS adoption in the American Studies Association have deterred other academic organizations from following suit. This, according to William A. Jacobson of Cornell Law, was because those who oppose BDS have "produced fact sheets and other factual information to counter the false narratives and ahistorical arguments of BDS."

== See also ==
- Anti-BDS laws
