= Liberal Catholic Church of Ontario =

The Liberal Catholic Church of Ontario (LCCO) was a non-theosophical Liberal Catholic denomination in Canada, now merged into the Christ Catholic Church International, which formed in 1991. The LCCO grew out of the Old Catholic Diocese of Hamilton in 1949 by William Henry Daw, who was appointed LCCO's first bishop in 1955.

== See also ==
- Community Catholic Church of Canada
- Independent Anglican Church Canada Synod
