= Ontario Educational Resource Bank =

The Ontario Educational Resource Bank (OERB) is a learning object repository (LOR) that has been available since December, 2006. It contains resources that match the kindergarten - grade 12 curriculum expectations. Students and teachers can search for content within it. Teachers can also contribute resources that they have created so that other teachers and students can make use of them.

The LOR holds a range of different types of resources such as worksheets, lesson plans and interactive Flash and Authorware learning objects. There are also deconstructed units and activities from the Secondary level courses in the provincial Learning Management System. Content can be viewed online, or downloaded and modified to fit the needs of students and the teaching style The OERB is accessible by all teachers and students of provincially funded schools. Access is provided through the local school board.

The website for the Ministry's e-learning Ontario initiative is found at: http://elearningontario.ca/
