= Green belt (disambiguation) =

Green belt or greenbelt is an area of protected open space around an urban area.

Green belt may also refer to:

== Open spaces ==
=== Canada ===
- Greenbelt (Golden Horseshoe), a protected area in the Greater Toronto Area
- National Capital Greenbelt, a protected area near Ottawa

=== United States ===
- Barton Creek Greenbelt, Austin, Texas
- Staten Island Greenbelt, a system of contiguous public parkland and natural areas in New York City, New York
- Long Beach Green Belt path, an open space habitat for native plants in California

=== Other places ===
- European Green Belt, along the corridor of the former Iron Curtain
- German Green Belt, straddling the former East-West border in Germany
- Green belt (United Kingdom), a policy for controlling urban growth, includes a list of green belts in the United Kingdom
  - Metropolitan Green Belt, a protected area around London, England, United Kingdom
- Santo Domingo Greenbelt, a greenbelt surrounding the city of Santo Domingo, Dominican Republic
- Green belt (Rennes), a protected area around Rennes, France
- Green Belt of Vitoria-Gasteiz, Álava, Spain

== Places ==
- Greenbelt, Maryland, a city near Washington, D.C., named for its greenbelt
  - Greenbelt station, a Washington Metro and MARC Train station
  - Greenbelt Historic District, a National Historic Landmark
  - Greenbelt Homes, Inc., a historic housing cooperative
  - Greenbelt News Review, a cooperative newspaper
  - Greenbelt Park, managed and operated by the National Park Service

== Roads and paths ==
- Green Belt (Pittsburgh), part of the Allegheny County belt system, Pennsylvania, U.S.
- Boise greenbelt, an urban trail system in Boise, Idaho, U.S.

== Other uses ==
- A Green Belt, a token in Sir Gawain and the Green Knight
- Bering Sea Green Belt, the continental shelf break area of the Bering Sea
- Green Belt of Glory, a set of memorial facilities at the forefront of the battle for Leningrad
- Green Belt Movement, an organization based that focuses on environmental conservation and community development in Kenya
- Green Belt Theory, a geopolitical theory
- Greenbelt (Ayala Center), a large shopping mall in Makati, Philippines
- Greenbelt Alliance, a land conservation and urban planning organization in California, U.S.
- Greenbelt Festival, an annual Christian arts festival in England
- Six Sigma Green Belt, a certification level of the Six Sigma processes

== See also ==
- The Residences at Greenbelt, a residential skyscraper complex in Makati, Philippines
- Greenway (landscape)
