= Ontario Universities Fair =

Higher education recruitment event in Canada

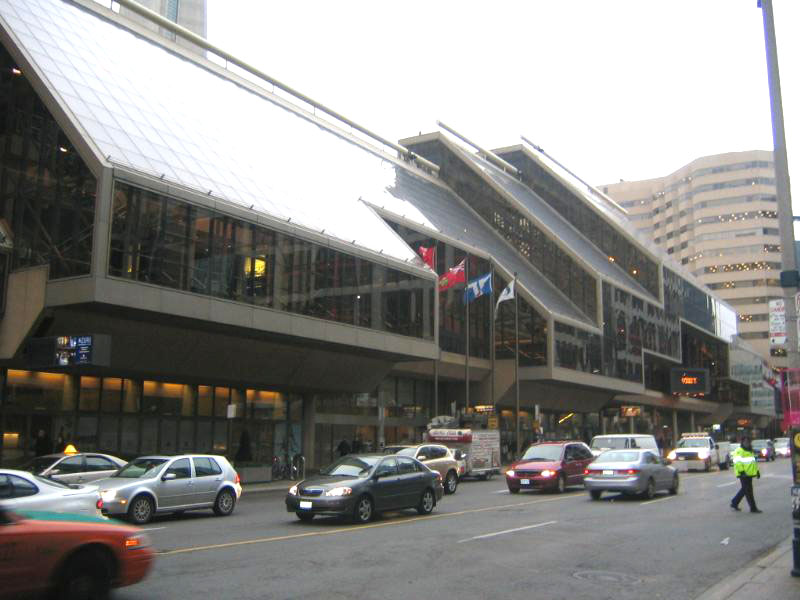
Metro Toronto Convention Centre

The Ontario Universities' Fair is an annual event which promotes public universities in the Canadian province of Ontario. The first OUF was held in 1997 and has grown rapidly to accommodate more than 100,000 guests that visit over a three-day period. Usually held this event in around late September or early October each year. Each university sets up a booth in the South Building of the Metro Toronto Convention Centre. All institutions conduct separate presentations in rooms that will accommodate up to several hundred students in each session. Many institutions will bring professors, administrators and current students to meet prospective students from the Greater Toronto Area.

The event can be very congested due to the large number of high school students and their parents attending, and backpacks are therefore subject to security bag checks. Students are able to pick up view books, and provide universities with their personal contact information for future communication. Ontario universities also complete several scheduled weeks of travel throughout the province, which is titled the "Ontario Universities' Regional Fairs".
