= Ontario High School =

Ontario High School may refer to:

- Ontario High School (California) in Ontario, California
- Ontario High School (Ohio) in Ontario, Ohio
- Ontario High School (Oregon) in Ontario, Oregon
