= Organic Council of Ontario =

The Organic Council of Ontario (French: Conseil Biologique de l'Ontario) is a non-profit membership based association based in Guelph, Ontario in Canada.

The association represents the Organic farming sector in Ontario at the national and provincial level.

The Organic Council of Ontario represents all groups and provides leadership and support in order to grow the organic sector of Ontario. Its members include producers, processors, marketers, distributors, suppliers, certifiers, retailers, restaurants and others.
