= Online Donor Registry (Ontario) =

The Ontario Online Donor Registry is a website where Ontario residents, aged 16 and older, can register their consent to be an organ and tissue donor. This registry was created to help ease questions and ambiguities with organ donor wishes. The virtual registry also increases Ontario donations with increased accessibility. The registration process can be done through beadonor.ca. Online donor registries have also become popular in the United States, where one can register through Donate Life America; Malaysia, registering through their National Transplant Registry; and Saudi Arabia, registering through the Saudi Center for Organ Transplantation.

== History ==
In 2000, the Ontario government created the Trillium Gift of Life Network for the role of organizing Ontario’s organ and tissue registry. The purpose of creating the Trillium Gift of Life Network was to increase organ and tissue donation across Ontario and improve the process of registering. The Trillium Gift of Life Network also is in place to support health care professionals in implementing decisions surrounding organ and tissue donation.

An online organ donation registry through the Trillium Gift of Life Network became available June 14, 2011 known as Be a Donor. The registry was created to save lives and decrease transplant wait times. Other initiatives to promote this registry include to raise awareness and information, which permits Ontarians to make decisions about organ and tissue donation. Providing awareness about the online organ donation registry will make organ donation convenient and help to create a system for individuals who may be interested in this decision but unaware of how to register. Once an individual is registered on the Be a Donor site, their decision is recorded in the Ministry of Health and Long-Term Care database.

The increased awareness created by Be a Donor in Ontario caused the online registry to crash on June 15, 2011 due to the numerous responses and over-subscriptions of Ontarians who wanted to sign up to be donors.

== Operation ==
The online donor registry was created in order to document an individual's desire to donate their own organs at their time of death. The new registry, which was announced in 1997 in British Columbia, has allowed for remote and electronic accessibility. Prior to 1997, an individual’s decision to donate was indicated by the presence of a decal on one’s driver’s license. The difficulty was that people had to put the decal on their license, which was likely considered to be inconvenient. Also, in the event of an accident, it was not always easy to find a person’s license. A vast improvement brought in by the new online registry is the simplicity in determining a person’s donation wish at the time of an accident or other serious injury, which would otherwise be difficult to determine.

As of June 2011, the Trillium Gift of Life Network made it possible for Ontarians to register online. This will ease the process of registration and minimize the shortage of donors. After observing the improvement that both British Columbia and Ontario have started to experience, Manitoba is expected to follow suit and implement its own registry.

In order to register consent in Ontario for organ donation, the individual must have two important criteria. These criteria require the individual to be at least the age of 16 years as well as have a valid Ontario Health Card Number and version code. Once an individual registers, their information is recorded into the Ministry of Health and Long-Term Care’s database and version code.

=== Media coverage ===
The Toronto Star, CBC News, and CTV News have publicized the Ontario online organ donation registry, among other local newspapers. The registry has received much praise from its former in-person registration at ServiceOntario centre and mail-in consent form. According to Auditor General Jim McCarter, 40 hospitals were not required to alert Trillium Gift of Life Network that they had patients on life support who required donors. Be A Donor will help people have a more complete life, as exemplified by Consonni, whose life was on hold for four years for a liver transplant.

== How to register ==
There are three ways of registering for the Online Organ Donor Registry. The first way is online. Steps to register online:

1. Go to beadonor.ca and click on Register Now
2. User is redirected to an Ontario Service website, click on Start Online Service.
3. Then, click on I Want to Register.
4. Next, a Registration Verification screen with the following questions:
  1. My current health card is:
    1. A red and white Health card
    2. A photo Health card
  2. Health card number and version number (if shown on card)
  3. Date of Birth: Year/Month/Day
5. Once all filled in, click Next
6. The final page will say; Donor Status: Yes, you are a registered organ and tissue donor.

If one is not able to register online, you can either go to a Service Ontario centre or download a paper copy of the consent form and send it to a Service Ontario centre.

== Statistics ==
Statistics can be a great way to see the reasons behind needing certain registries in a country. The following are statistics on the wait-list and the transplants performed in Canada in 2008, 2009, and 2010. The data is from the Canadian Institute for Health Information that focuses on British Columbia, Alberta, Saskatchewan, Manitoba, Ontario, Quebec, and Nova Scotia.

From 2001 to 2010, kidney and liver waitlists decreased, respectively by 330 and 27 patients. The pancreas waitlist, however, increased by 24 patients since 2001. Heart, lung, and heart with lungs remained moderately stable. These trends are indicated in the Organ wait-list by organ for 2001 to 2010. Transplants from 2001 to 2010, however, indicated an increased trend by 275 operations in deceased and living kidney, kidney pancreas, deceased and living liver, heart and lung transplants. Heart with lung transplants remained stable. These trends are indicated in the Organ transplant by organ for 2001 to 2010.

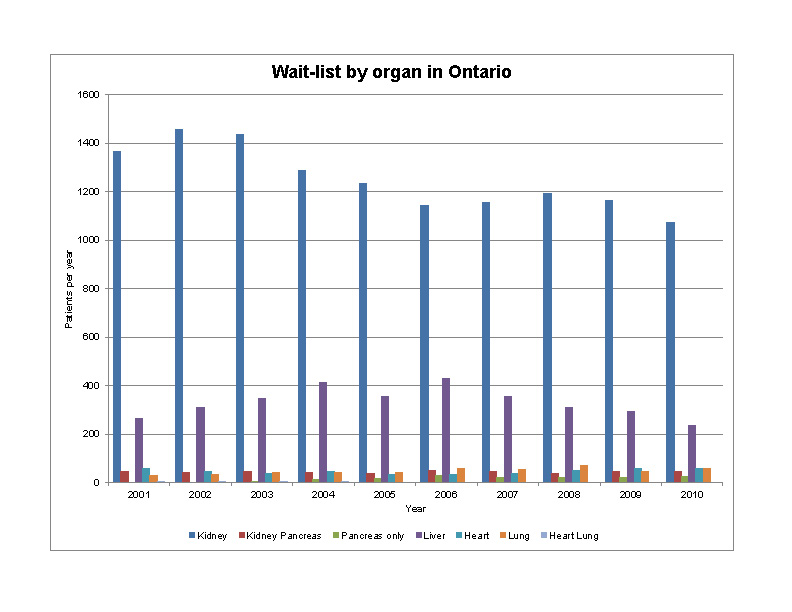
Ontario organ wait-list by organ from 2001 to 2010. Statistics from Trillium Gift of Life.

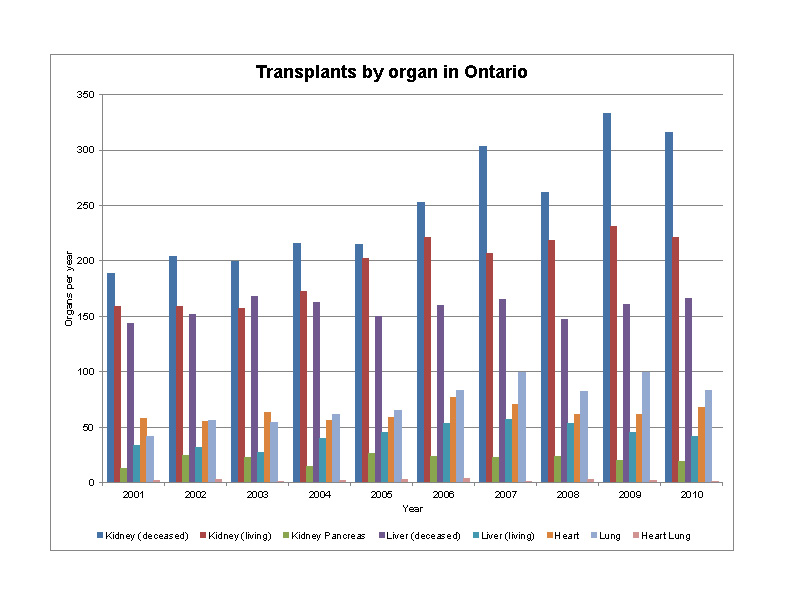
Ontario organ transplant by organ from 2001 to 2010. Statistics from Trillium Gift of Life.

=== Canadian organ wait-list ===
Looking at the statistics for Canada, one can see that there has been an increase in the number of people waiting for a transplant between 2009 and 2010, while between 2008 and 2009 there was a decrease in the number of people on the wait-list.

Canadian organ wait-list
	Total number of patients (2010)	Total number of patients (2009)	Total number of patients (2008)
Canada	4,529	3,796	4,380
Provinces			
British Columbia	373	321	308
Alberta	725	472	620
Saskatchewan	145	161	144
Manitoba	262	177	167
Ontario	1,515	1,229	1,739
Quebec	1,241	1,202	1,159
Nova Scotia	268	234	242

=== Ontario organ transplants ===
Since 2008 there has been a steady increase of people receiving transplants. Comparing the number of transplants performed to the number of people waiting in 2010, there are twice as many people waiting then there is transplants being performed. This may be a sign of what is to come in future years. If the wait-list continues to increase at a faster rate than the number of transplants performed, the demand is not going to meet the supply.

Canadian Organ Transplant performed
	Total Number of patients (2010)	Total Number of Patients (2009)	Total Number of Patients (2008)
Canada	2,153	2,138	2,083
Provinces			
British Columbia	295	211	266
Alberta	342	291	286
Saskatchewan	2	15	35
Manitoba	58	50	53
Ontario	934	980	836
Quebec	411	452	479
Nova Scotia	111	139	128

== Advantages and disadvantages ==
The online donor registry presents a way to benefit lives. While the online aspect of the registry makes organ donation easier, there are both advantages and disadvantages.

=== Advantages ===
- Registering as an online organ donor has the potential of saving as many as eight lives, as well as improving the lives of seventy-five more.
- There are privacy standards put in place by the Ontario government to protect each individual who provides personal information online during the registration process.
- Registering yourself online as an organ donor eliminates the need for family members to make the decision to donate your organs in the event of an unexpected death.
- Donors are eligible to register online independent of factors such as their medical history, age, and sexual orientation.
- The online registry has made giving consent to donate much more convenient and accessible.

=== Disadvantages ===
- As with any online service, technical problems may arise while inputting information into the registry; therefore, the information may need to be entered a second time, which may deter individuals from spending the time to re-register.
- Certain religions, such as the Jehovah's Witnesses, oppose organ donation and transplantation.
- It is considerably expensive to be screened and to undergo testing procedures.
- There are several criticisms to the selection process in deciding who receives a transplant. One verdict claimed that patients on the waiting list, with a low to medium possibility of dying, would not show an improvement in their life expectancy after a transplant. Therefore, only patients on the waiting list with a high possibility of dying will increase their life expectancy after receiving a transplant.

== Existing registries ==
The online organ donation is not a new concept. Greater awareness has been necessary in supporting hospitalized patients, as seen with Saudi Arabia, where patients may travel outside the country to receive proper treatment.

=== United States ===
There are approximately 52 online organ donation services in the United States. Through Donate Life America, Americans can learn about organ donation among other contributions such as tissue donation, cornea donation, and living donation. When users select Register Now, they are directed to an interactive webpage where they identify the state where they would like to register as a donor.

=== Malaysia ===
Through the Malaysian Society of Transplantation in Malaysia, citizens can explore the option of organ donation. The Malaysian Society of Transplantation facilitates a direct link to the National Transplant Registry, that provides information and statistics on organ donation. The website also allows Malaysians to register online.

=== Saudi Arabia ===
The Kingdom of Saudi Arabia facilitates an information source about organ donation, making online forms and donor cards available to download. Their mission is to improve patient life expectancy as well as easy patient suffering. They also provide Regulations and Procedures for Organ Donation from the Living Genetically Unrelated. Organ donation is criticized to be a cultural taboo that can lead to a death sentence, especially young accident victims or the chronically ill. Many citizens are forced to travel abroad to India and to the Philippines to buy an organ since organ donation is not considered an obligation for many in the Arab World and Saudi Arabia.
