= Ontario Social Safety Network =

The Ontario Social Safety Network (OSSN) is a social activist organization in the Canadian province of Ontario. Its members include low-income Ontarians, anti-poverty groups, labour groups, social agencies, and faith-based groups. The OSSN is devoted to removing poverty and the causes of poverty; some of its members have been involved in providing legal aid to low-income persons.

The network was formed in 1993. The organization seems to have its suspended activities in the mid-2000s.
