= Ontario Amateur Softball Association =

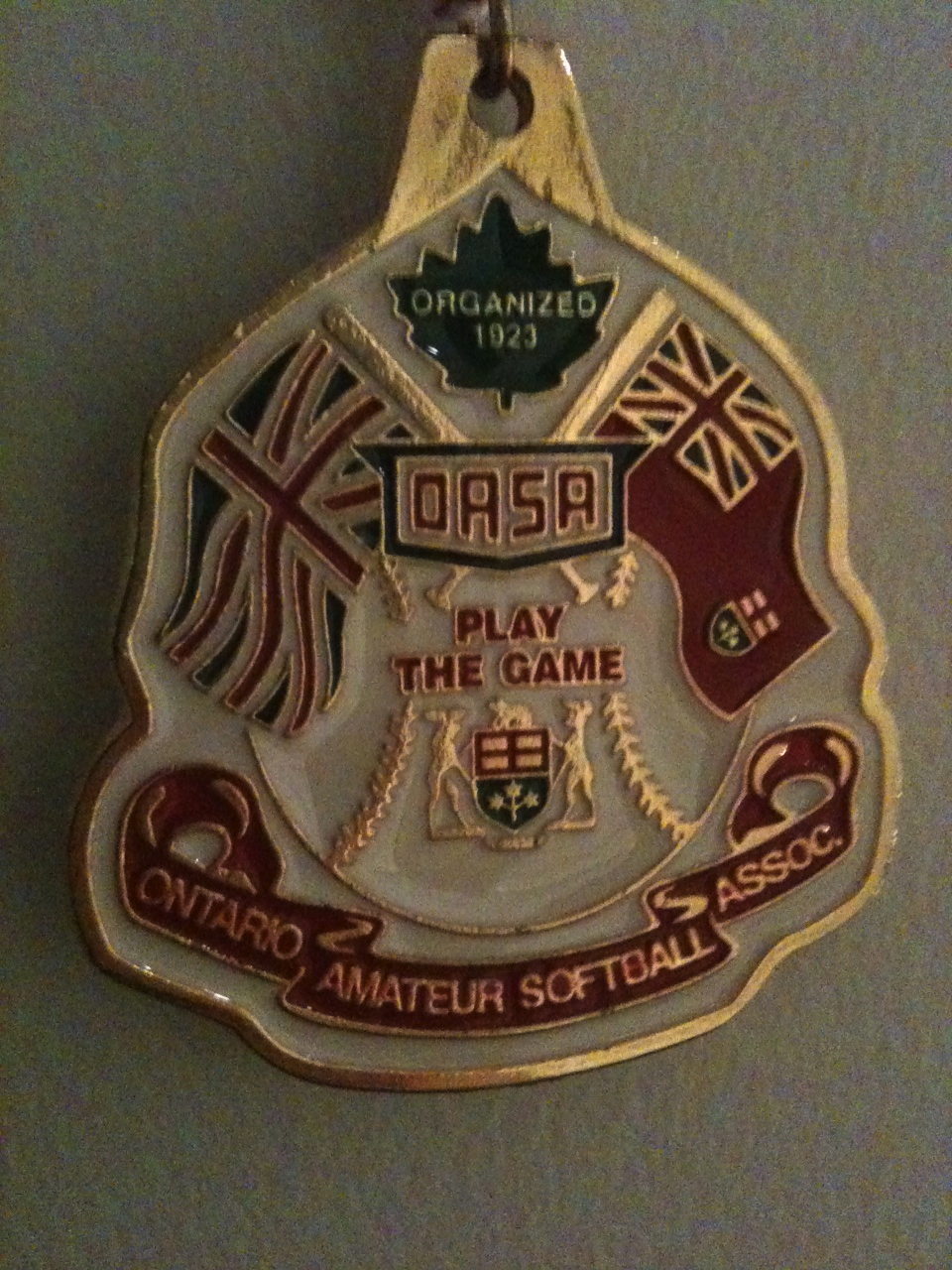
- An OASA Gold Medal
- Sport: Softball
- Founded: 1923, in Ontario, Canada
- President: Dave Northern (as of 2020)
- Motto: Play the Game
- Country: Canada
- Website: www.oasa.ca

The Ontario Amateur Softball Association (OASA), a member association of Softball Ontario. The OASA is the governing body for male competitive fast-pitch softball in Ontario. The association organizes qualifying tournaments and provincial championships. Each year the association inducts one or more members who have contributed to the development of amateur softball in Ontario into its Hall of Fame.

The OASA conducts "elimination tournaments" which qualify teams for Softball Canada men's and boys' national championships at the Masters, Senior, U23, U20, U17 and U15 levels.

== History ==
Beginning in the early 1890s, softball, a derivative of baseball, extended into Canada as a popular summer activity. While initially only played indoors, in 1908, softball was played outdoors at Burlington Beach, Ontario. Two years later in 1910, an informal public-school league was formed in Hamilton, Ontario.

At the time of its formation in 1923, the OASA was the world's first amateur softball organization. The association standardized the rules for softball throughout Ontario. The association began organizing local softball teams into leagues and organizing games and tournaments.

The OASA celebrated its 100th anniversary on April 22, 2023 with a celebration in Cambridge, Ontario.

The game is now played in many places around the world. During World War II, Canadians introduced the sport to the Netherlands. in fact, the Netherlands acquired and published the official OASA rules in 1946.

Softball was an Olympic sport for women starting in 1996, but was dropped by the International Olympic Committee for the 2012 and 2016 Olympics. Women's softball was added to the program for the 2020 Summer Olympics.

The highest level of play for male softball is the Men's Softball World Cup, organized by the World Baseball Softball Confederation, at which various nations compete for the title of World Champion.

== Activities ==
The OASA is one of four member associations within the provincial organization Softball Ontario, which is, in turn, a member of Softball Canada. The OASA has three votes at the annual general meeting of Softball Canada.

Each year OASA nominates several athletes for the Quest for Gold Ontario Athlete Assistance Program, an initiative set forth by the Ministry of Health Promotion and Sport of Ontario to promote and assist exceptional athletes in Ontario.

The OASA also conducts "Softball in Schools" clinics as well as "Springboard" events to promote softball to young athletes in Ontario.

== Game Play ==
The OASA follows Softball Canada rules, with some modifications. The seven-inning game consists of two teams competing against each other with the end goal of attaining more runs than the opposing team. Each team is permitted to have nine players on the field in fastpitch softball.

In fastpitch softball, a "windmill" style of pitching is utilized, as the pitcher's arm makes a complete backward rotation before completing the pitch. With this style of pitching, elite male pitchers have been known to reach around 70 mph.

=== Players ===
Each player on the team must belong to the appropriate age category for their division. Each player must wear a uniform of the same colour, style and trim as that of the rest of the team. Ball caps are permitted but all players must wear the same colour. All participating players in any single game must be included in the lineup card submitted to the official umpires prior to the beginning of the game.

=== The Field ===
The OASA requires field dimensions to follow those as directed by Softball Canada. Pitching distances depend on age classification and range from 30 feet for players aged nine and under, up to 46 feet for adult men. The distances between bases also depend on age classification and range from 45 feet for players nine and under, up to 60 feet for adult men.

=== Age and Divisions ===
The following table lists the age classification for the OASA. Ages are as of January 1 of the year of competition.

Division	Age
U9 (formerly Junior Mite)	Under age 9
U11 (formerly Mite)	Under age 11
U13 (formerly Squirt)	Under age 13
U15 (formerly Peewee)	Under age 15
U17 (formerly Bantam)	Under age 17
U20 (formerly Midget)	Under age 20
U23 (former Junior)	Under age 23
Intermediate / Senior Men	Over age 17
Masters	Over age 40
Legends	Over age 50

== Executive ==
The association is run by an elected executive and appointed committee members.
