= CUPE Ontario and disinvestment from Israel =

The Ontario division of the Canadian Union of Public Employees (CUPE) has supported the Boycott, Divestment and Sanctions (BDS) campaign against Israel since 2006. Their stance has encountered opposition from the Canadian Jewish Congress and parts of the press but also widespread support from university professors, Independent Jewish Voices, Palestine House, Canadian Arab Federation and labour unions. In 2009 the CUPE Ontario university workers' committee proposed to extend the campaign to boycott any joint work with Israeli institutions that carry out military research. That resolution became the focus of extensive controversy and was modified in response to pressure from the CUPE national president; the amended version was brought before the CUPE Ontario conference in May 2009 and passed with a 2/3 majority.

== 2006 ==
In May 2006, the Ontario wing of the Canadian Union of Public Employees (CUPE) voted unanimously to pass a resolution to support the "international campaign of boycott, divestment and sanctions against Israel until that state recognizes the Palestinian right to self-determination." The three-point resolution continued on to call for action to develop an education campaign about the "apartheid nature of the Israeli state", and for CUPE National to conduct research into Canadian involvement in the occupation. The Canadian Labour Congress was also enjoined to add its voice "against the apartheid-like practices of the Israeli state...". The resolution summarized its reasons for making this call by directly referencing the "Israel Apartheid Wall", and by recognizing the 170 Palestinian groups that have called for the global campaign. It further noted the voice of its sister union, CUPE BC, and its opposition to the occupation of Palestine. The BDS Campaign has received widespread support across the world from labour unions, church organizations and city councils.

Abraham Foxman of the Anti-Defamation League labelled CUPE's action as "deplorable and offensive." The Ontario regional director of the Canadian Jewish Congress, Steven Schulman, characterized the vote as "outrageous." "For a respected labour union to engage in such a vote, which is completely one-sided and based on mistruths, is shocking," he said.

In January 2021, B'Tselem, a highly respected Israeli human rights organization issued a report that declared Israel to be an apartheid state. In May 2021, Human Rights Watch issued a 213-page report that also accused Israel of operating an apartheid system where Jewish citizens have supremacy over Palestinians in Israel and the occupied territories.

On June 6, 2006 Willie Madisha, president of the 1.2-million-member Congress of South African Trade Unions wrote, in a two-page letter, "I congratulate CUPE Ontario for their historic resolution on May 27 in support of the Palestinian people- those living under occupation and those millions of Palestinian refugees living in the Diaspora. We fully support your resolution."

CUPE Ontario president Sid Ryan has defended his organization's position by referring to the support it received from the Alliance of Concerned Jewish Canadians, a group of Canadian Jews who oppose Israeli policy towards the Palestinians and supports the CUPE resolution. A petition was distributed in the Israeli and Jewish communities by the ACJC in support of the CUPE action. In part it read:

We assure CUPE that it is no more anti-Semitic to criticize and oppose Israeli government policies than it was anti-American to oppose the Vietnam war or is anti-Canadian to oppose the present war in Iraq. It is never anti-Semitic to oppose injustice, destruction, gross inequity, and inequality. We also assure CUPE that Israel, having the 4th most powerful military in the world, is in no existential danger.

CUPE National has responded to the Ontario resolution by stating that,

CUPE National respects the right of its chartered organizations to take a stand on all issues. As a national union we are governed by policy resolutions adopted at our national conventions. And as such, we will not be issuing a call to our local unions across Canada to boycott Israel.

The United Church of Canada, Toronto Conference has expressed support for CUPE stating that the Church:

- reaffirms the United Church's commitment to "the right of Israel to exist in peace and security within internationally-recognized borders and the right of the Palestinians to exist in peace and freedom in an internationally-recognized homeland and state";
- recognizes that "the path of peace is dependent on the ending of the Israeli occupation of the West Bank, Gaza, and East Jerusalem, including the withdrawal of Israeli settlements there";
- and calls on the church to divest and boycott goods and corporations related to Israeli settlements in the occupied territories. Boycott, divestment and sanctions are time honoured non-violent ways of bringing an end to intolerable situations.

On July 7, political commentator Lysiane Gagnon wrote in The Globe and Mail of Toronto:

Of course, CUPE and the United Church's anti-Israel activists will tell you their positions are just about Israel's policies and have nothing to do with Jews. But the line between anti-Semitism and obsessive anti-Zionism is thin and blurry. It is certainly perfectly acceptable to criticize the state of Israel, but the practice can become anti-Semitic when only the Jewish state is singled out as a rogue state, in a world that contains so many horrible regimes.

An editorial in the Canadian Jewish News also took issue with some CUPE leaders comparisons between Israel's policies and South Africa's apartheid system.

Let there also be no condoning the sly attempt by CUPE Ontario leaders to hide or obfuscate its true aim. The logic of the haters of Israel is as simple as it is distorted: Israel is an apartheid state. It must be treated in the same manner as the only other apartheid state was ever treated. It must be dismantled! By joining with the hate-filled slogans being hurled at Israel, the union, was de facto supporting, condoning and even affirming the call for the elimination of the Jewish State.

== 2009 call for boycott of Israeli academics ==
In January 2009, CUPE's Ontario University Workers Coordinating Committee announced plans to introduce a resolution that would ban Israeli academics from speaking, teaching or researching at Ontario universities. Sid Ryan, president of CUPE Ontario, stated that "Israeli academics should not be on our campuses unless they explicitly condemn the university bombing and the assault on Gaza in general." Ryan stated that the resolution was a reasonable response to Israel's attack on the Islamic University, which he likened to the torching of books by Nazis during the Second World War.

Janice Folk-Dawson, chairwoman of the university workers committee, stated that resolution will protect the quality of education by preventing Israeli academics from professing biased views. She also stated that "International pressure on Israel must increase to stop the massacre that is going on daily. We are proud to add CUPE voices to others from around the world saying enough is enough" and that support for the resolution "is coming from the rank-and-file members, not just the leadership." Despite the expected backlash, Folk-Dawson stated that "We believe we are doing the right thing."

=== Support ===
The Alliance of Concerned Jewish Canadians expressed support for the resolution, stating that "We think it perfectly appropriate for a Canadian union to seek some means of counteracting the Canadian government's reckless support for Israeli government intransigence -- for example, by trying to destabilize the elected government of the Palestinian authority."

Bruce Katz, Jewish co-president of Palestinian and Jewish Unity (PAJU) Montreal, stated, "I wish to congratulate you and CUPE Ontario for your valiant support for the cause of Palestinian human rights."

The United Church of Canada's Toronto Conference has expressed support for CUPE's position as did the Congress of South African Trade Unions

Michael Neumann, a philosophy professor at Trent University in Peterborough, Ontario expressed support for the boycott. Neumann argued that a boycott is not antisemitic, stating that "It targets Israeli, not Jewish, professors." He further stated that "People may always have bad motives underlying good motives. And it's not absolutely impossible that some of these people have anti-Semitic feelings deep down, but do I think that plays a large part? No, I certainly do not." Judy Haiven, an assistant professor at Saint Mary's University in Halifax, Nova Scotia, who is Jewish, commended CUPE for calling for the boycott. In a letter to the editor, Haiven stated that "the many silent professors in Israel who refuse to criticize their own government for human rights violations and for murdering Arab civilians should not be welcomed," although "Israeli academics who speak against the massacre in Gaza should be exempt from a boycott."

=== Criticism ===
The resolution was immediately criticized by the Leo Rudner of the Canadian Jewish Congress, who stated "I think it's ironic individuals who speak about freedom of speech jump to the opportunity to take that freedom away from other individuals." Emanuel Adler, chairman of Israeli Studies at the University of Toronto, also criticized the resolution, stating that "the conflict and the violence should not be brought inside the university." Jonathan Kay, a columnist for the National Post, sharply criticized the resolution, stating that "Mr. Ryan and his fellow CUPE leaders care about demonizing only one country: the Jewish state."

Frank Dimant, vice-president of Bnai Brith Canada criticized the resolution, stating that "This blatant and openly discriminatory resolution by CUPE-Ontario against Israeli nationals is in contravention of Canadian Human Rights Law. Public unions should not be used as breeding grounds for negatively singling out one group of people and denying them their basic rights and freedoms."

Paul Davenport, President of the University of Western Ontario (UWO), subsequently stated that UWO will not participate in any boycott of Israeli academics. Davenport stated that "I'm very dismayed at the suggestion by CUPE that universities should boycott faculty from Israel. "We believe in academic freedom ... it is simply very unwise to try to eliminate interactions between academics."

Oren Gross, former professor at Tel Aviv University and current professor at University of Minnesota Law School, sharply criticized CUPE, asking why CUPE did not propose boycotts against "American and British academics who did not condemn their governments' war in Iraq, Russian academics who had been silent during their country's assaults on Chechnya and Georgia, Chinese academics who did not protest against their government's actions in Tibet, and ... Palestinian academics who remained silent in the face of a continuous campaign of terrorism orchestrated by Hamas from Gaza."

Costanza Musu, an associate professor at the University of Ottawa, called the boycott "wrong and maladroit in every possible way" and stated that "It is a very sad moment when someone in academia starts considering the boycott of colleagues as a valid an honourable instrument of political struggle."

On 14 January 2009, the University of Ottawa Centre for International Policy Studies (CIPS), directed by Professor Roland Paris, published the following 'Statement on Freedom of Speech': "Freedom of speech is a core value of Canadian society, especially within its universities where the expression and debate of different positions is crucial to learning. As an academic centre that promotes research and dialogue on international policy, CIPS opposes the Canadian Union of Public Employees' contemplated ban on Israeli academics from speaking, teaching or research work at Ontario universities. CIPS will not participate in such a boycott or any other attempt to silence academics, including those expressing controversial or unpopular opinions. CIPS will continue to invite academics of any nationality to participate in scholarly activities and public speaking events in Ottawa."

== Revised proposal ==
CUPE national president Paul Moist subsequently issued a statement declaring that "I believe such a resolution is wrong and would violate the anti-discrimination standards set out in the CUPE Constitution and that "I will be using my influence in any debates on such a resolution to oppose its adoption." Approximately 10 days after its initial announcement, the CUPE removed its call to boycott individual academics from its website and replaced it with statement that stated that "this is not a call to boycott individual Israeli academics. Rather, the boycott call is aimed at academic institutions and the institutional connections that exist between universities here and those in Israel." The National Post noted that the original resolution mentioned Sid Ryan three times and listed him as the main contact for questions, but that the new resolution did not mention Ryan at all. Despite his initial statements, Ryan later stated that he agreed with Moist.

== Revised resolution ==
On February 22, 2009, CUPE's university workers committee, representing 17 universities in Ontario, passed a version of the original resolution which called for members at Ontario universities to boycott working with Israeli institutions doing research that benefits that nation's military, but not individual academics. Members will be encouraged, but will not be forced, to mount boycott campaigns in such circumstances.

The Jewish Telegraphic Agency stated that the "non-binding resolution is intended to protest Israel's recent military action in Gaza."

CUPE Ontario President Sid Ryan stated that the original resolution calling for boycotts of all Israeli academics who did not condemn Israeli military tactics was wrong. He defended the new resolution which he stated "broadens and deepens" a 2006 resolution on Israel to support a campaign of economic boycotts, divestment and sanctions against Israel for its occupation of Gaza. Ryan also stated that CUPE will investigate whether its pension plans are investing in companies developing weapons in Israel.

Ryan likened CUPE's boycotts to those of Gandhi, stating that "It's following a long tradition and a peaceful tradition of using the pressures of a boycott in a peaceful way to bring pressure to bear on the state of Israel to end this illegal occupation."

=== Response from Canadian Jewish groups ===
The revised resolution received mixed reactions.

Palestinian and Jewish Unity and the Alliance of Concerned Jewish Canadians supported the resolution.

Bernie Farber, CEO of the Canadian Jewish Congress (CJC), stated that resolution was discriminatory and anti-Semitic and proves that "anti-Semitism is once again amongst us." Farber also stated that "It's devious, it's disingenuous. They talk about Israeli universities and partnerships. What makes up a partnership? Israeli academics and Canadian academics make up a partnership. You're still talking about people, except you're hiding it. It means you are prepared to boycott your fellow academic and it's absolutely disgusting. I found it profoundly disappointing that people would just sit back and not get it, that they would plunge into this dark hole of anti-Semitism."

Mark Goldberg, vice-chairman of CJC Ontario Region, accused CUPE of being disingenuous with its claim that the boycott was not directed at individual academics, asking rhetorically: "How do you boycott institutions without boycotting individuals in the process?" He also stated "to support the proposed discriminatory resolution represents another low point in the proud history of the Canadian labour movement's involvement in international affairs. The changes that were made to this resolution since it was first announced are cosmetic at best and do nothing to alter the basic discriminatory elements."

B'nai Brith Canada called the resolution "discriminatory and racist." Frank Dimant, B'nai Brith Canada's executive vice-president, stated that the motion "marginalizes its supporters here at home and disenfranchises CUPE members who are supportive of democratic Israel and its right to defend its citizens against terrorist groups like Hamas and Hezbollah." He also stated that everyone who voted in favour of the resolution was "promoting hatred and advancing a discriminatory agenda that is at odds with Canadian values of tolerance, respect and human rights for all.

=== Response from Canadian Federal Government ===
==== Conservative Party ====
The Conservative Government of Prime Minister Stephen Harper sharply criticized the CUPE Ontario resolution against Israel as "intolerant." Following the passage of the resolution, Multiculturalism Minister Jason Kenney stated that while the resolution was not illegal, it involved "singling out and targeting the Jewish democratic state of Israel for opprobrium." He also stated that:

The premise of these things seems to be that the Jewish people shouldn't have their own country. Underneath that, there's a certain kind of dangerous intolerance which is not consistent with Canada's best values. This reinforces the whole, extreme, unbalanced rhetoric about Israel as an apartheid state, Israel as a racist state – to quote the Canadian Arab Federation – this creates an opinion environment which makes it acceptable to start shouting at Jewish kids who probably also happen to support Israel. It's creating the opinion environment which has become very, very uncomfortable for Jewish students on many of our campuses.

==== Liberal Party ====
The opposition Liberal Party also sharply criticized the resolution. In a media release posted on the party's website, Liberal Justice Critic Dominic LeBlanc stated that boycotts or divestment appeals that target Israel for singular condemnation and exclusion are unacceptable. He was quoted as saying:

The CUPE resolution is reprehensible because it singles out academics for discriminatory treatment because of their nationality. This goes beyond reasonable criticism—we're seeing Israeli Jews demonized in a way that has absolutely no place in our public discourse. I'm greatly disappointed in CUPE Ontario's leadership for working to stifle the free exchange of ideas and opinions that should be at the centre not only of every university campus, but also of our national life as Canadians...It is both foolish and reckless to undermine the relationship between Canadian and Israeli academic institutions with polemics.

Liberal Party leader Michael Ignatieff subsequently criticized the resolution. In a statement published in the National Post, Ignatieff stated:

The Liberal Party of Canada condemns the CUPE resolution in the strongest possible terms. I salute the others who have spoken out against the resolution, including my colleagues on both sides of the aisle in the House of Commons, and CUPE's national president, Paul Moist, who has refused to support the resolution. I encourage all CUPE members, and all Canadians, to follow their example.

=== Other responses ===
In a letter to the National Post, members of CUPE 3902 at University of Toronto sharply criticized Ryan and the resolution. They argued any boycott of academic institutions is an attack on freedom of thought and violates the spirit of the union's constitution. The letter also stated that "Sid Ryan seems to think that he and his closest colleagues have the right to determine which academics we ought to listen to and which ought to be censored." The letter concluded with a call of Ryan to resign from his position.

== Status of proposed boycott and future actions ==
Since the boycott resolution has passed CUPE's University Workers Committee, it will now be on the agenda at CUPE Ontario's conference in May.

Tyler Shipley, spokesperson for CUPE local 3903 at York University, told the Toronto Star that his group will begin to advocate for York to sever financial ties to Israel and will back the upcoming Israeli Apartheid Week.

== Practical effect of the boycott resolution ==
Some observers have questioned what practical effect the resolution could have since the 20,000 university workers represented by CUPE Ontario include campus staff but almost no full-time faculty.
