= Good Luck, Maryland =

- Ghost town and former census-designated place
- Location within Maryland Location within the United States
- Coordinates: 38°59′36″N 76°49′57″W
- Country: United States
- State: Maryland
- County: Prince George's
- Elevation: 171 ft (52 m)
- Time zone: UTC−5 (Eastern (EST))
  - Summer (DST): UTC−4 (EDT)
- GNIS feature ID: 1714391

Good Luck is the name of a former rural neighborhood and census-designated place in Prince George's County, Maryland, United States. It is located along Good Luck Road at and around the intersection with Greenbelt Road (Maryland Route 193).

The former settlement is currently occupied by the Goddard Space Flight Center, DuVal High School, and a residential community.

== History ==
The first land grant in what later became known as Good Luck was Swaringham’s Pasture (1719), followed by Prince Spring (1754), Foxes Range (1756), Walnut Hill (1762), and the northern part of Recovery Enlarged (1762). Good Luck derives its name from the name given to a new post office established there in 1830, the successor to Magruder’s (or Magruder’s Tavern) post office four miles away. Thomas Magruder, the innkeeper, died in 1830, and the post office was relocated and renamed Good Luck within months of his death. The Good Luck post office operated from 1830 to 1852, and from 1872 to 1876. The name was also applied to the surrounding rural neighborhood. Good Luck is fancifully depicted as a compact village with a cluster of buildings on Bachmann’s panoramic Civil War map, “The Seat of War” (1861), whereas Martenet’s map of Prince George’s County, published the same year, presents it as a rural neighborhood of scattered homes. The only business in Good Luck on Martenet’s map was a blacksmith and wheelwright shop. Why the post office was named Good Luck is not documented. There were several land tracts named Good Luck in Prince George’s County, but none at this location.

== Decline ==
In 1871, the village of Glennville (later renamed Glenn Dale) was platted by John Glenn and Edmund B. Duvall. Located on the Baltimore and Potomac Railroad, Glenn Dale prospered, and in 1876, Good Luck's post office was moved there. In 1899, Good Luck was described as a "rural village" alongside "the railroad village of Glenn Dale".

"Good Luck Road" is still located at the site of the former settlement, which is currently occupied by the Goddard Space Flight Center and a residential community.

== Census designated place ==
A census-designated place (CDP) called "Good Luck" was established in the general area of the former settlement during the 1970 United States census. The population of the Good Luck CDP was 10,584. The land area of the CDP was 3.2 sq mi (8.3 km^{2}) and the population density was 3,308 per square mile. In 1980, Good Luck CDP ceased to exist after the census area was split to create the CDPs of Glenn Dale and Goddard.
