= Jiha Moon =

South Korean artist (born 1973)

- Born: 1973 (age 52–53); Daegu, South Korea
- Education: Korea University; Ewha Womans University; University of Iowa

Korean name
- Hangul: 문지하
- RR: Mun Jiha
- MR: Mun Chiha

Jiha Moon (born 1973) is a contemporary artist who focuses on painting, printmaking, and sculptural ceramic objects. Born in Daegu, South Korea, Moon is currently based in Tallahassee, Florida, after years of living and working in Atlanta, Georgia. She joined Florida State University's Art department faculty in the fall of 2023.

== Early life and education ==
Moon was born in Daegu, South Korea in 1973. She describes her Korean family as the greatest creative influence in her life. As a child, Moon grew up watching her mother and grandmother making things—curtains, cushions, seasonal blankets, bojagi—to bring joy to their daily lives.

She earned a Bachelor of Fine Arts from Korea University in 1996 and a Master of Fine Arts in Western Painting from Ewha Womans University in 1999. After graduating, Moon relocated to the United States, enrolling in the University of Iowa's graduate program, receiving both a Master of Arts (2001) and a Master of Fine Arts (2002) in painting there.

Moon began teaching in 2004. She first taught at Wesley Theological Seminary in Washington, D.C, after relocating there post-MFA for her husband's job. In 2012–2013, she taught at Agnes Scott College in Atlanta, Georgia. From 2015 to 2016, she was a workshop instructor at Museum of Contemporary Art of Georgia (MOCA GA). In 2016, she was appointed adjunct professor at Georgia State University; she became a regular lecturer in 2019, and taught there until 2023. In 2023, Moon relocated to Tallahassee, Florida, to work as an assistant professor at Florida State University.

== Work ==
Yellowave (black) 1 (2020) at the Renwick Gallery in Washington, DC in 2022

Moon makes both painting and ceramic vessels. She describes her paintings as cultural landscapes, where her ceramic sculptures act more as hybrid portraits. Moon has spent roughly half of her life in Korea, where she was born, and half in the United States; the feeling of not fully belonging in either culture is one that drives much of the imagery and iconography within her work.

"I feel like my life is like a collage, and I'm a piece of it. I cut and pasted myself from Korea to America. I use tradition as a point of departure, but I don't want my work to be about an idea. I want it to become something completely new. Tradition is history set in place, but culture is always shifting. I like to juxtapose these two to create a dialogue. I want them to be harmonized as well as individually recognized. "

Moon's paintings combine visual icons and symbols from a variety of sources, cutting across culture lines to the accumulation of art historical, corporate, and advertising symbols in contemporary society. Eastern and Western imagery and painting techniques, emoji, internet icons, and folk art are present in her work. She is particularly interested in the ways cultural signifiers are interpreted differently by different viewers. For example, peaches are a common iconography in Georgia, where Moon lived; peaches are also an important symbol across Asian manuscript paintings and folk art, as a symbol of chasing bad spirits away. Moon enjoys using iconographies like the peach in her work, because they carry dual notions. She works primarily in acrylic paint on Hanji, a Korean paper, which she uses to help "keep [her] identity in [her] studio practice." She also incorporates fabrics, embroidery, and print collage in her paintings. After she completes the abstract version of a painting's composition, she re-configures or strategically defines some of the markings to suggest recognizable images, such as cartoon characters. She also incorporates mass-produced items like textiles, embroidered patches, small trinkets.

Art critic Roberta Smith wrote about Moon's work in the 2005 Asia Society exhibition "One Way or Another: Asian American Art Now," stating, "Jiha Moon packs...information into large, teeming paintings on paper, creating a sense of flux... rife with references to everything from traditional Chinese brush painting to contemporary cartoons."

Moon describes 19th century Joseon dynasty white porcelain as the first type of ceramics that captured her attention. She is especially drawn to the type of moon jars with lots of drawing on their surfaces, loving what she calls the "more human, imperfect, and humorous quality" of these vessels. Moon's own ceramic journey began with an award from MOCA GA in 2012; with the support she received, she paid a membership to a local clay studio and began to explore ceramics. One recurring theme in her ceramic work is the fortune cookie. Moon sees the cookie as a portrait of America, a symbol of the country's function as a melting pot; people assume the cookie has Chinese or Asian origins, when in fact it is an American invention. Moon often will use the cookie shape in the place of eyes or ears on her ceramic vessel, and she enjoys how easily it can be camouflaged within the work; "People do not see it immediately unless they pay attention. When they recognize it is a fortune cookie, they re-engage, go back and look at it again."

She has received a number of awards including the Joan Mitchell Foundation Painters and Sculptors Grant, the Trawick Prize, and a Museum of Contemporary Art of Georgia Working Artist grant. Moon has been an artist in residence at the Headlands Center for the Arts, the Omi International Arts Center, MacDowell Colony, the Fabric Workshop and Museum, and the Henry Luce III Center for the Arts and Religion.

Her work, Yellowave (black) 1, was acquired by the Smithsonian American Art Museum as part of the Renwick Gallery's 50th Anniversary Campaign.

Moon was awarded a Guggenheim Fellowship in the Fine Arts in 2023.

== Exhibitions ==
Moon has had solo exhibitions at the Mclean Project for the Arts (2003); Korean Cultural Service in Washington, DC (2003); Dega Gallery in Mclean, VA (2004); Elizabeth Roberts Gallery in Washington, DC (2004); Greenbelt Arts Center (2004); the Curator's Office in Washington, DC (2005, 2007, 2009, 2012); Brain Factory in Seoul, Korea (2006); Saltworks Gallery in Atlanta, GA (2008, 2010, 2012); Moti Hansson Gallery in New York, NY (2008); The Mint Museum in Charlotte, NC (2008); Mary Ryan Gallery in New York, NY (2010); Cheekwood Botanical Garden and Museum in Nashville, TN (2011); Clough-Hanson Gallery in Memphis, TN (2011); Arario Gallery in Seoul, Korea (2012); CUNY Graduate Center in New York, NY (2012); Savannah College of Art and Design in Savannah and Atlanta, GA (2013); Museum of Contemporary Art Georgia in Atlanta, GA (2013); Ryan Lee Gallery in New York, NY (2014); Weatherspoon Museum of Art in Greensboro, NC (2014); Reynolds Gallery in Richmond, VA (2016); Mindy Solomon Gallery in Miami, FL (2017, 2022); Patricia Sweetow Gallery in San Francisco, CA (2018); Alan Avery Art Company in Atlanta, GA (2018 - 2019); University of the South in Sewanee, TN (2019); Sumter County Gallery in Sumter, SC (2019); Zeitgeist Gallery in Nashville, TN (2019); the New Gallery at Austin Peay State University in Clarksville, TN (2020); Derek Eller Gallery in New York, NY (2020, 2022); Laney Contemporary in Savannah, GA (2020–2021); Abroms-Engel Institute for the Visual Arts at the University of Alabama in Birmingham, AL (2021); FSU Museum of Fine Arts in Tallahassee, FL (2022); and Shoshana Wayne Gallery in Los Angeles, CA (2023).

Moon's solo exhibition "Double Welcome: Most Everyone's Mad Here," which was organized by the Taubman Museum of Art and Halsey Institute of Contemporary Art, opened at the Taubman Museum of Art in Roanoke, VA, in 2015. It traveled to the Halsey Institute of Contemporary Art (2015), the Salina Art Center (2016), the Kalamazoo Institute of Arts (2016), the Jule Collins Smith Museum of Fine Art (2017), the Mennello Museum of American Art (2018), the Katzen Arts Center (2018), and the Crisp-Ellert Art Museum at Flagler College (2018). A catalogue by the same title was published by the Halsey Institute in 2017.

Moon has also participated in group exhibitions at the Arlington Art Center, the Atlanta Contemporary Art Center, the Hirshorn Museum and Sculpture Garden, the Fabric Workshop and Museum, the Smithsonian American Art Museum, and other galleries and museums across the world.

== Collections ==
- Asheville Art Museum
- Asia Society Singapore Tyler Print Institute
- The Fabric Workshop and Museum
- High Museum
- Hirshhorn Museum and Sculpture Garden
- Mint Museum
- Museum of Contemporary Art of Georgia
- National Museum of Women in the Arts
- Virginia Museum of Fine Arts

== Bibliography ==
2016:

- Hawley, Anthony. "Future Fossil, Other Vessel". Brooklyn Rail, June 3, 2016.

2014:

- Colvin, Rob. "In Survey of Southern Art, Place is the Space". Hyperallergic, September 5, 2014.
- Yau, John. "Postscript to the Whitney Biennial: an Asian-American Perspective". Hyperallergic, June 29, 2014.
- Yau, John. "Kathy Butterfly and the Aesthetic Challenge of "No Two Alike"". Hyperallergic, March 16, 2014.

2012:

- Kim, Micki Wick. "Jiha Moon". Korean Contemporary Art. Prestel Publishing: Munich, London, New York. Pg. 138–141. 2012.

2010:

- Cochran, Rebecca Dimling. "Critics' Pick: Jiha Moon". ARTFORUM.com, Feb 2010.

2008:

- McClintock, Diana. "Jiha Moon". Art Papers, Mar/Apr 2008.
- Cochran, Rebecca Dimling. "Jiha Moon". Art in America, May 2008.

2007:

- Cohen, David. "Weather Channels". The New York Sun, May 17, 2007.
- Oppenheim, Phil. "Talent Show, Atlanta". Art Papers, Sept/Oct 2007.
- Capps, Kriston. "Line Tripping." Washington City Paper, Oct 5, 2007.
- Wennerstrom, Nord. "Jiha Moon at Curator's Office". ARTFORUM, Dec 2007.

2006:

- New American Paintings. Open Press, #63 Mid Atlantic Regions. Boston, MA 2006.

McClintock, Diana. "Red Beans and Rice". Art Papers, Jan/Feb 2006.

- Howell, George. "Jiha Moon". Art Papers, Jan/Feb 2006.
- Smith, Roberta. "A Mélange of Asian Roots and Shifting Identities". The New York Times, Sept 8, 2006.
- Kunitz, Daniel. "Defying the Definitive". New York Sun, Sept 14, 2006.
- Yang, Jeff. "ASIAN POP/ Art Breakers". San Francisco Chronicle, Oct 16, 2006.

2005:

- Cudlin, Jeffry. "Digital Distortion". Washington City Paper, Dec 30 2005 - Jan 5 2006.
- O'Sullivan, Michael. "Jiha Moon's Shining Contrasts". The Washington Post, Sept 16, 2005.
- Dawson, Jessica. "Jiha Moon's Fantasy Islands". The Washington Post, Sept 15, 2005.

2004:

- Johnson, Ken. "'Semi Lucid,' White Columns". The New York Times, Oct 8, 2004.

== Further links ==
- Official website
- Curator's Office
- interview with Jiha Moon at the Fabric Workshop and Museum
- Landfall Press
- VIDEO: Dis/placements Conversation: Jiha Moon and Lilly Wei - Halsey Institute of Contemporary Art - September 18, 2020
- VIDEO: AEIVA Face-to-Face Interview Series Featuring Jiha Moon - November 13, 2020
- VIDEO: Artists & Curator Conversation: Jiha Moon, Pattie Chalmers, & Ehren Tool - Virginia MOCA - January 28, 2022
