= Greenbelt, Maryland =

Greenbelt
- City
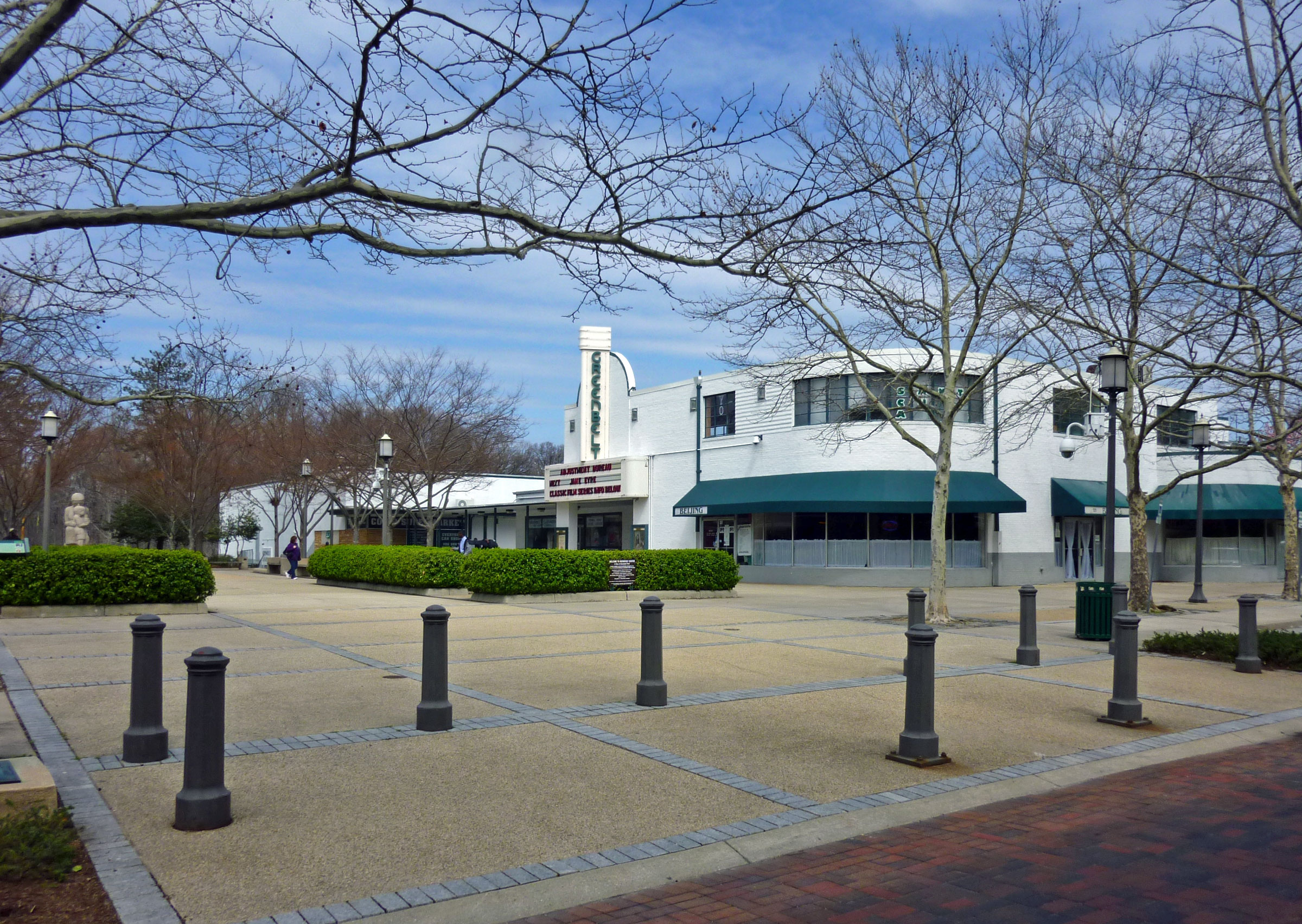
- Roosevelt Center in March 2011. The city's commercial center typifies the Art Deco style used during the original construction of Greenbelt.

- Flag Seal

- Location in Prince George's County and Maryland
- Interactive map of Greenbelt
- Location within the state of Maryland
- Coordinates: 38°59′41″N 76°53′07″W
- Country: United States
- State: Maryland
- County: Prince George's
- Incorporated: June 1, 1937

Government
  - Mayor: Emmett V. Jordan (D)

Area
  - Total: 6.29 sq mi (16.29 km^{2})
  - Land: 6.24 sq mi (16.15 km^{2})
  - Water: 0.054 sq mi (0.14 km^{2}) 0.99%
- Elevation: 157 ft (48 m)

Population (2020)
  - Total: 24,921
  - Density: 3,997.3/sq mi (1,543.35/km^{2})
- Time zone: UTC−05:00 (Eastern)
  - Summer (DST): UTC−04:00 (Eastern)
- ZIP Codes: 20768, 20770–20771
- Area codes: 301 & 240
- FIPS code: 24-34775
- GNIS feature ID: 2390596
- Website: www.greenbeltmd.gov

Greenbelt is a city in Prince George's County, Maryland, United States, and a suburb of Washington, D.C. At the 2020 census, the population was 24,921.

Greenbelt is the first and the largest of the three experimental New Deal Greenbelt Towns, the others being Greenhills, Ohio, and Greendale, Wisconsin. Greenbelt was planned and built by the federal government as an all-White town. The cooperative community was conceived in 1935 by Undersecretary of Agriculture Rexford Tugwell, whose perceived collectivist ideology attracted opposition to the Greenbelt Towns project throughout its short duration. The project came into legal existence on April 8, 1935, when Congress passed the Emergency Relief Appropriation Act of 1935. Under the authority granted to him by this legislation, President Franklin D. Roosevelt issued an executive order, on May 1, 1935, establishing the United States Resettlement Administration (RA/RRA).

First called Maryland Special Project No. 1, the project was officially named Greenbelt when the Division of Suburban Resettlement of the Resettlement Administration began construction, on January 13, 1936, about eight miles north of Washington. The complete Greenbelt plans were reviewed at the White House by President Roosevelt and First Lady Eleanor Roosevelt on April 30, 1936. The first tenants, after selection in a stringent application process, moved in to the town on September 30, 1937. The construction consisted of structures built in the Art Deco, Streamline Moderne, and Bauhaus architectural styles.

Greenbelt is credited as a historic milestone in urban development because it was the initial model for the privately constructed suburban Washington, D.C., planned cities of Reston, Virginia, and Columbia, Maryland.

The original federally-built core of the city, known locally as Old Greenbelt, was recognized as the Greenbelt Historic District by the Maryland Historical Trust, and is listed on the National Register of Historic Places as a National Historic Landmark District.

Greenbelt's population, which includes residents of privately built dwellings dating from after the end of the federal government's ownership of the city, was recorded as 23,068 at the 2010 U.S. census and 24,921 at the 2020 census.

== Geography ==
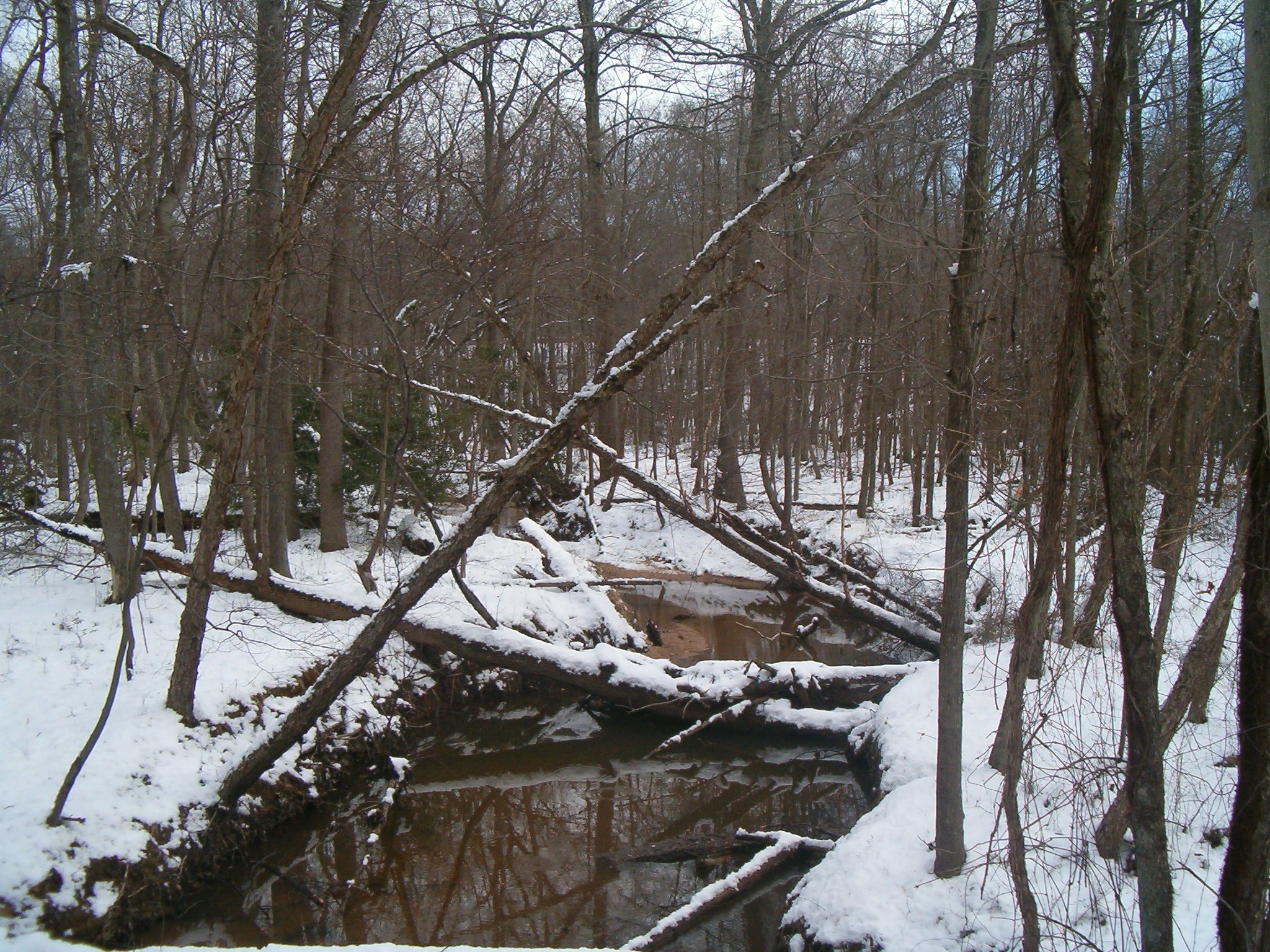
Winter view of Still Creek in Greenbelt Park

Greenbelt is located at 38°59′41″N 76°53′07″W. According to United States Census Bureau data, as of January 1, 2018, the city has a total area of 6.23 square miles (16,146,235 square meters), of which 6.18 square miles (16,003,389 square meters) is land and 0.06 square miles (142,846 square meters) is water. Greenbelt's ZIP Codes are 20770, 20771, and 20768. The ZIP Code 20770 contains all residential and business addresses that correspond to actual physical locations inside the geographic boundaries of the City of Greenbelt. The 20768 ZIP Code is assigned exclusively to post-office box (P.O. Box) addresses, while 20771 is the designated ZIP Code for Goddard Space Flight Center, situated on federal government owned land that is contiguous with a portion of Greenbelt's eastern border.

NASA's Goddard Space Flight Center, located directly adjacent to Greenbelt's eastern boundary, utilizes a Greenbelt postal address (Greenbelt, MD 20768), as well. It is partially within the former Goddard census-designated place.

Greenbelt Park, a unit of the National Park System, is located within the City of Greenbelt's boundaries, at its southernmost portion.

== Transportation ==
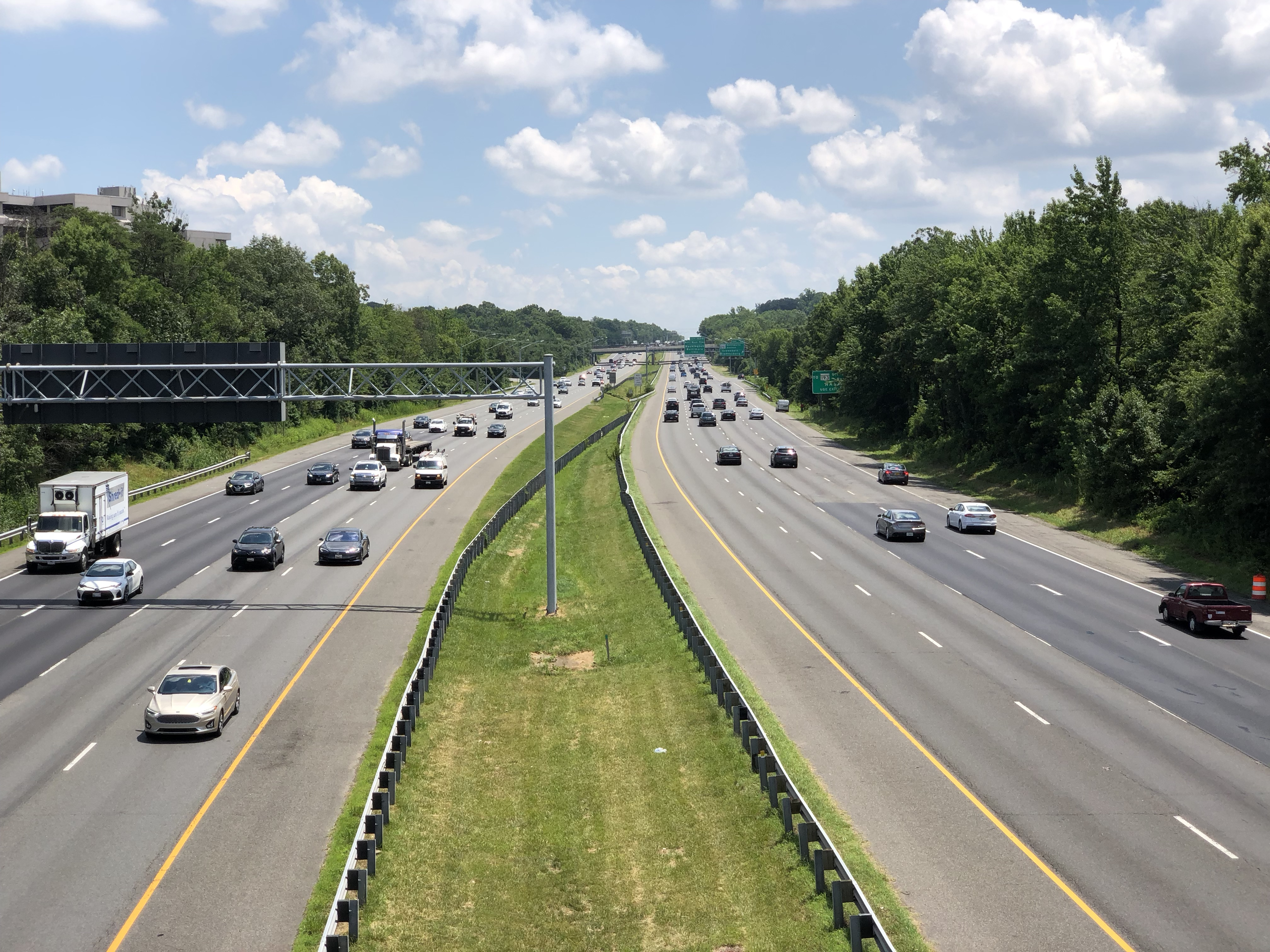
I-95/I-495 southbound in Greenbelt

=== Roads and highways ===
Two major highways pass through and have interchanges in Greenbelt: the Capital Beltway (I-95/I-495) and the National Park Service's owned and maintained portion of the Baltimore–Washington Parkway (unsigned MD 295). The Greenbelt portion of the Baltimore–Washington Parkway (B–W Parkway) is part of the parkway's 19-mile section which was listed on the National Register of Historic Places in 1991.

Additionally, Greenbelt Road is part of state highway MD 193, which connects several suburban communities in both Prince George's and Montgomery counties. Kenilworth Avenue (MD 201) traverses Greenbelt in a north–south direction, running parallel to the B–W Parkway, providing an alternate travel route into Washington, D.C., from Greenbelt. The southernmost Maryland portion of Kenilworth Avenue forms a major interchange with both the B–W Parkway and US 50 near the Maryland–D.C. line, and continues into Washington, as the Kenilworth Avenue Freeway (DC 295).

=== Public transportation ===
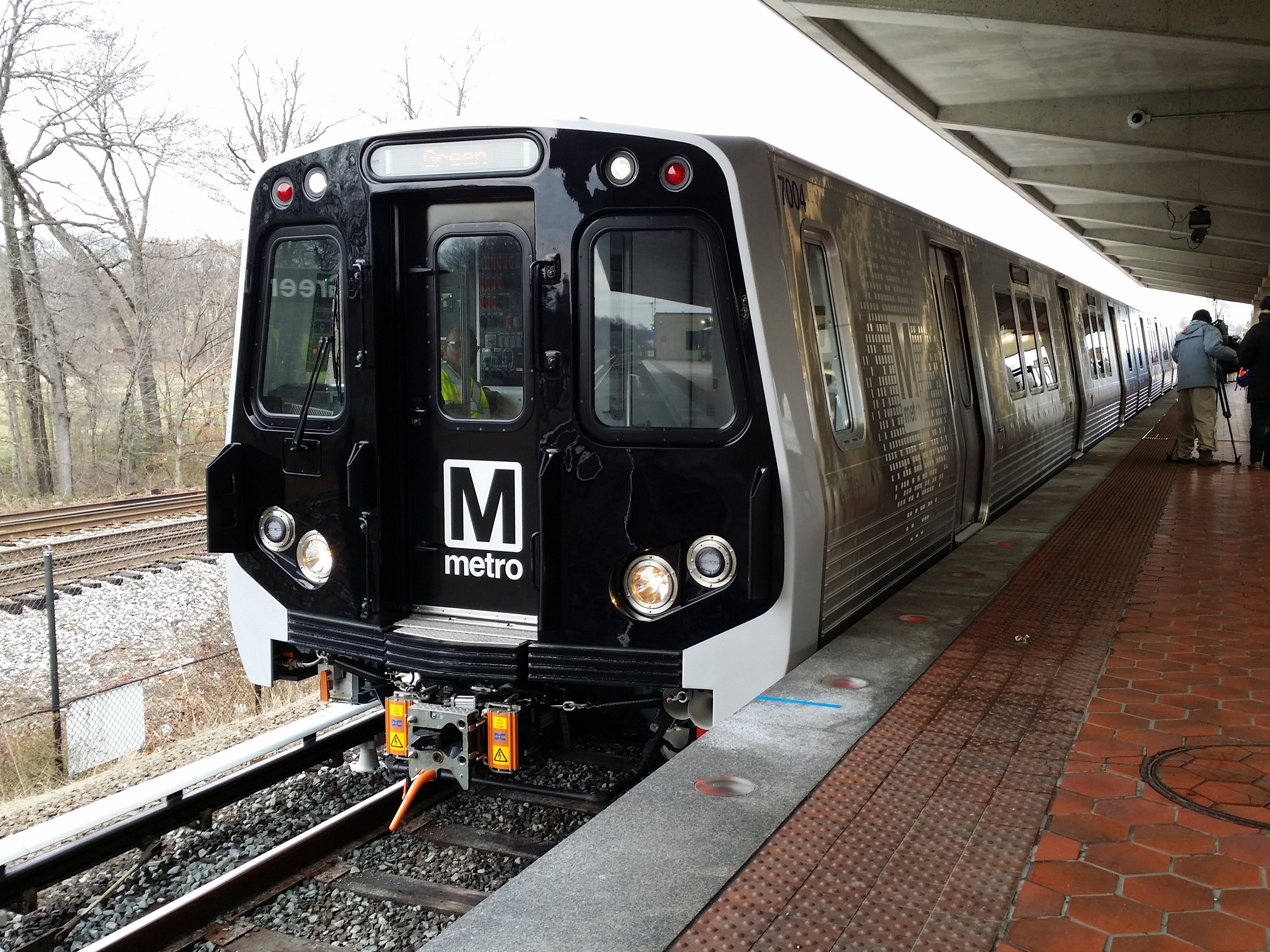
Debut of a next generation WMATA 7000-series rail car at Greenbelt Metro Station in January 2014

Washington Metro's rapid transit rail system serves Washington, D.C., and neighboring communities in Maryland and Northern Virginia, by operating 98 Metro stations, which includes the Greenbelt, the northern terminus of Metro's Green Line and Yellow Line. Commuter rail service to the station is provided by MARC Train's Camden Line, which connects the District of Columbia's Washington Union Station with Camden Station in Baltimore. The Camden Line provides service by utilizing the original 1835 Baltimore and Ohio Railroad (B&O) track route between Washington and Baltimore, now part of the CSX System.

Metrobus, Prince George's County's THE BUS (routes 11 and 15X), and the University of Maryland's Shuttle-UM (route 143; University ID required) each have bus routes which serve the city of Greenbelt. Through a city–university partnership between 2017 and 2019, Greenbelt residents were permitted to unlimited travel on Shuttle UM, with the purchase of a $10 annual pass. The City operates limited transportation via the Greenbelt Connection, a 12-passenger wheelchair-accessible van.

== Bordering areas ==
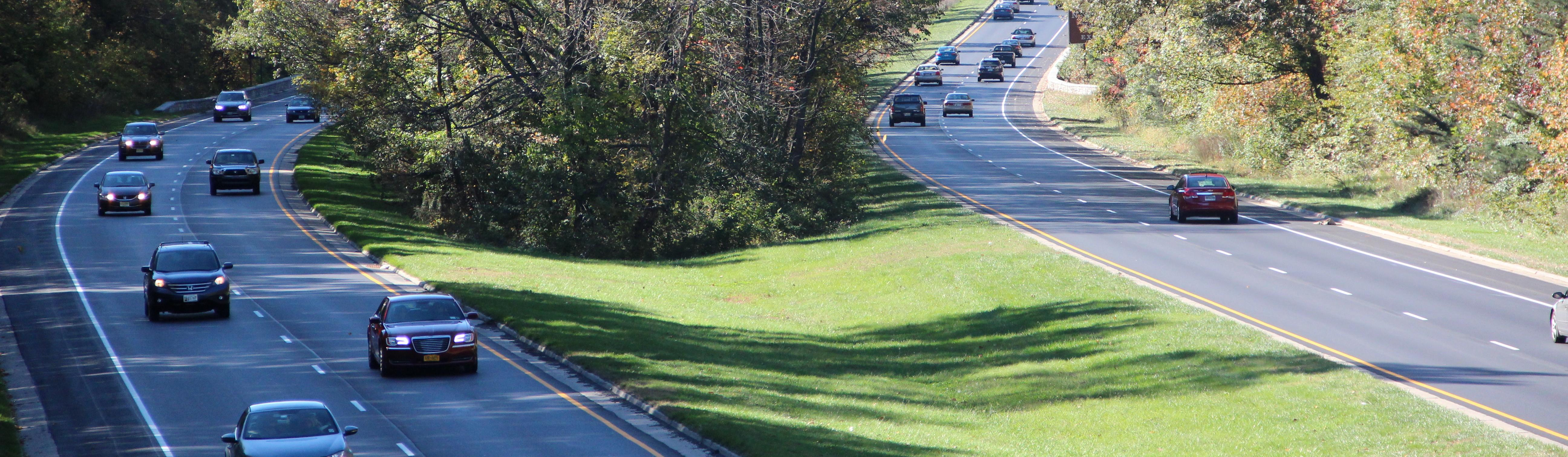
Scenic entry to the Nation's Capital: The Baltimore–Washington Parkway

- Beltsville Agricultural Research Center
- Berwyn Heights
- College Park
- Goddard
- Lanham
- New Carrollton
- Glenn Dale

== History ==
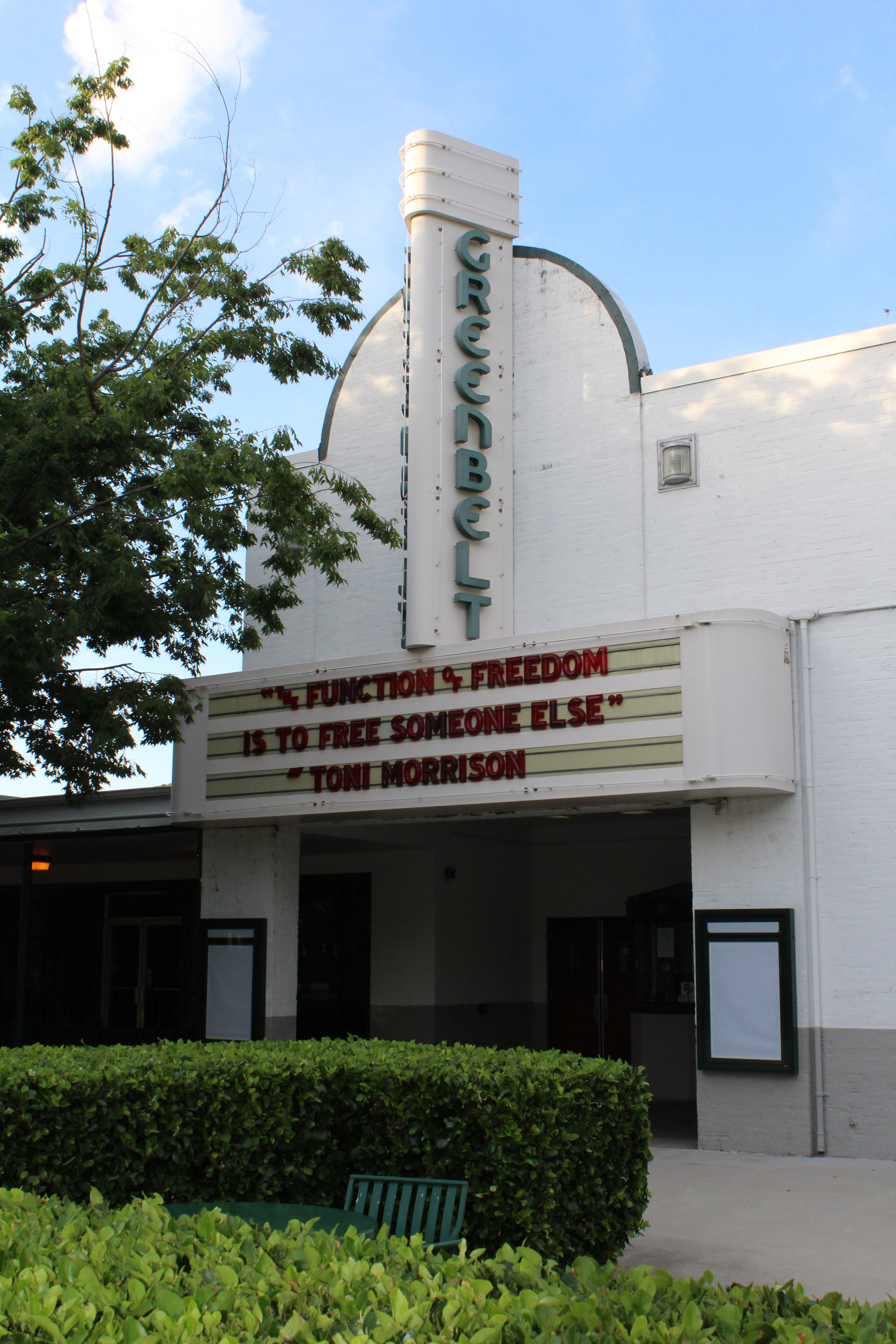
The Old Greenbelt Theatre in 2020, with a marquee referencing the George Floyd protests. The theatre opened on September 21, 1938, screening the film Little Miss Broadway with Shirley Temple.

Greenbelt was settled on September 30, 1937, as a public cooperative community in the New Deal era. The concept was at the same time both eminently practical and idealistically utopian: the federal government would foster an "ideal" self-sufficient cooperative community that would also ease the pressing housing shortage near the nation's capital. Construction of the new town would also create jobs and thus help stimulate the national economic recovery following the Great Depression.

Greenbelt, which provided affordable housing for federal government workers, was one of three Greenbelt Towns conceived in 1935, by President Franklin D. Roosevelt's Brain Trust member Rexford Tugwell, who was serving as the president's Undersecretary of Agriculture. The project was officially authorized in May 1935. First, on April 8, 1935, the United States Congress passed the Emergency Relief Appropriation Act of 1935. Then under the authority granted to him from this legislation, President Roosevelt issued an executive order, on May 1, 1935, establishing the United States Resettlement Administration (RA / RRA). Rexford Tugwell agreed to serve as the Administrator of the Resettlement Administration, in addition to his Undersecretary of Agriculture position, without receiving any additional salary.

Working alongside Tugwell was Charles W. Yost. The two other Greenbelt Towns are Greendale, Wisconsin (near Milwaukee) and Greenhills, Ohio (near Cincinnati). A fourth town, Roosevelt, New Jersey (originally called Homestead), was planned but was not fully developed on the same large scale as Greenbelt.

Eleanor Roosevelt, wife of President Franklin D. Roosevelt, helped Tugwell lay out the Maryland town on a site that had formerly consisted largely of tobacco fields. She was also heavily involved in the first cooperative community designed by the federal government in the New Deal Era, Arthurdale, West Virginia, which sought to improve the lives of impoverished laborers by enabling them to create a self-sufficient, and relatively prosperous, cooperative community. Cooperatives in Greenbelt include the Greenbelt News Review, Greenbelt Consumers Coop grocery store, the New Deal Cafe, and the cooperative forming the downtown core of original housing, Greenbelt Homes Incorporated (GHI).

The architectural planning of Greenbelt was innovative, as was the social engineering involved in this federal government project. Applicants for residency were interviewed and screened based on income and occupation, and willingness to become involved in community activities. African-Americans were initially excluded, but were later included by the Greenbelt Committee for Fair Housing founded in 1963, and came to account for 41% of residents, according to the 2000 census. The same census data also indicates that African-Americans are isolated in certain parts within the town, and the percentage of African-Americans within the historic area is between 0% and 5% on most blocks. Much of the federal government planned and developed portion of the city is located within the Greenbelt Historic District.

Greenbelt was the subject of the 1939 documentary film The City.

In 2021, the city created a reparations task force to study the issue of whether or not to award reparations to African-Americans in Greenbelt.

== Demographics ==
Historical population
Census	Pop.	Note	%±
1940	2,831		—
1950	7,074		149.9%
1960	7,479		5.7%
1970	18,199		143.3%
1980	17,332		−4.8%
1990	21,096		21.7%
2000	21,456		1.7%
2010	23,068		7.5%
2020	24,921		8.0%
U.S. Decennial Census; 2010 2020

=== Racial and ethnic composition ===
Greenbelt city, Maryland – Racial and ethnic composition Note: the US Census treats Hispanic/Latino as an ethnic category. This table excludes Latinos from the racial categories and assigns them to a separate category. Hispanics/Latinos may be of any race.
Race / Ethnicity (NH = Non-Hispanic)	Pop 2000	Pop 2010	Pop 2020	% 2000	% 2010	% 2020
White alone (NH)	7,986	5,974	5,176	37.22%	25.90%	20.77%
Black or African American alone (NH)	8,746	10,852	11,897	40.76%	47.04%	47.74%
Native American or Alaska Native alone (NH)	45	43	47	0.21%	0.19%	0.19%
Asian alone (NH)	2,586	2,238	2,323	12.05%	9.70%	9.32%
Native Hawaiian or Pacific Islander alone (NH)	5	18	10	0.02%	0.08%	0.04%
Other race alone (NH)	75	61	192	0.35%	0.26%	0.77%
Mixed race or Multiracial (NH)	630	581	996	2.94%	2.52%	4.00%
Hispanic or Latino (any race)	1,383	3,301	4,280	6.45%	14.31%	17.17%
Total	21,456	23,068	24,921	100.00%	100.00%	100.00%

=== 2020 census ===
As of the 2020 census, Greenbelt had a population of 24,921. The median age was 35.0 years. 22.3% of residents were under the age of 18 and 11.4% of residents were 65 years of age or older. For every 100 females there were 85.5 males, and for every 100 females age 18 and over there were 81.2 males age 18 and over.

100.0% of residents lived in urban areas, while 0.0% lived in rural areas.

There were 10,244 households in Greenbelt, of which 30.6% had children under the age of 18 living in them. Of all households, 29.8% were married-couple households, 22.1% were households with a male householder and no spouse or partner present, and 41.5% were households with a female householder and no spouse or partner present. About 35.3% of all households were made up of individuals and 10.2% had someone living alone who was 65 years of age or older.

There were 10,789 housing units, of which 5.1% were vacant. The homeowner vacancy rate was 1.3% and the rental vacancy rate was 5.6%.

Racial composition as of the 2020 census
Race	Number	Percent
White	5,581	22.4%
Black or African American	12,051	48.4%
American Indian and Alaska Native	153	0.6%
Asian	2,335	9.4%
Native Hawaiian and Other Pacific Islander	19	0.1%
Some other race	2,838	11.4%
Two or more races	1,944	7.8%

=== 2010 census ===
During the census of 2010, there were 23,068 people, 9,747 households, and 5,367 families residing in the city. The population density was 3,673.2 inhabitants per square mile (1,418.2/km^{2}). There were 10,433 housing units at an average density of 1,661.3 per square mile (641.4/km^{2}). The racial makeup of the city was 30.1% White, 47.8% African American, 0.3% Native American, 9.7% Asian, 0.1% Pacific Islander, 8.6% from other races, and 3.3% from two or more races. Hispanic or Latino of any race were 14.3% of the population.

There were 9,747 households, of which 31.0% had children under the age of 18 living with them, 30.7% were married couples living together, 18.3% had a female householder with no husband present, 6.0% had a male householder with no wife present, and 44.9% were non-families. 36.1% of all households were made up of individuals, and 7.3% had someone living alone who was 65 years of age or older. The average household size was 2.37 and the average family size was 3.12.

The median age in the city was 33.7 years. 22.8% of residents were under the age of 18; 10.1% were between the ages of 18 and 24; 34.4% were from 25 to 44; 25.3% were from 45 to 64, and 7.5% were 65 years of age or older. The gender makeup of the city was 46.7% male and 53.3% female.

=== 2000 census ===
For the census of 2000, there were 21,456 people, 9,368 households, and 4,965 families residing in the city. The population density was 3,586.6 people per square mile (1,385.3/km^{2}). There were 10,180 housing units at an average density of 1,701.7 per square mile (657.3/km^{2}). The racial makeup of the city was 39.7% White, 41.4% African American, 0.2% Native American, 12.1% Asian, 0.1% Pacific Islander, 3.1% from other races, and 3.5% from two or more races. Hispanic or Latino of any race were 6.5% of the population.

There were 11,202 households, out of which 26.9% had children under the age of 18 living with them, 33.1% were married couples living together, 15.0% had a female householder with no husband present, and 47.0% were non-families. 35.0% of all households were made up of individuals, and 5.8% had someone living alone who was 65 years of age or older. The average household size was 2.29 and the average family size was 3.00.

In the city, the population was spread out, with 21.9% under the age of 18, 12.5% from 18 to 24, 39.1% from 25 to 44, 19.8% from 45 to 64, and 6.7% who were 65 years of age or older. The median age was 32 years. For every 100 females, there were 91.8 males. For every 100 females age 18 and over, there were 88.2 males.

The median income for a household in the city was $46,328, and the median income for a family was $55,671. Males had a median income of $39,133 versus $35,885 for females. The per capita income for the city was $25,236. About 6.0% of families and 10.2% of the population were below the poverty line, including 12.7% of those under age 18 and 7.2% of those age 65 or over.

== Government ==
The City of Greenbelt operates under a council-manager government as established by the city charter, the first such arrangement in Maryland. The Council consists of seven members elected by plurality-at-large voting. From their members, the Council selects the Mayor and the Mayor Pro Tem (who assumes the duties of the Mayor when the Mayor is unavailable). The Council has traditionally chosen the member with the highest vote count to be Mayor and the member with the second-highest vote count as Mayor Pro Tem. Elections are held every two years, in odd-numbered years, in part to diminish the influence of political parties. Political party affiliations are not an official part of the city election process and are seldom part of candidate campaigns. Regular council meetings are held on Mondays, twice per month except during July, August, and December, when meetings are held once per month.

In 2025, voters approved a non-binding Advisory Referendum in favor of adopting Ranked Choice Voting (RCV) for city council elections by a 2:1 margin. The City Council will make the final decision on whether to adopt RCV.

The City Council is supported by 14 advisory boards and committees of citizen volunteers. The council appoints a professional city manager responsible for supervising government operations and implementing the policies adopted by the council.

The 2025 election selected the current city council:

- Mayor: Emmett V. Jordan
- Mayor Pro Tem: Kristen L. K. Weaver
- Council Members: Jenni Pompi, Danielle McKinney, Frankie Santos Fritz, Amy Knesel, and Silke Pope

The council selects the City Manager:

- City Manager: Josué Salmerón

=== 2009 election reform ===
Of the ten incorporated cities in Prince George's County, Greenbelt is one of three with at-large elections for council and mayor (the others are District Heights and New Carrollton). The remaining seven use combinations of districts and at-large voting. On February 28, 2008, the Maryland American Civil Liberties Union and Prince George's County NAACP sent a letter to the Greenbelt City Council claiming that Greenbelt's at-large system may violate Section 2 of the Voting Rights Act of 1965. According to the letter, the 2000 Census indicated that African-Americans constituted 38% of Greenbelt's voting-age population, Asians 13%, and Latinos 6%. At the time, however, all members of the city council were white. The letter proposed that the city switch to single-winner district-based voting, cumulative voting, or choice voting, and indicated a lawsuit would follow if no reform were implemented. While the city population is racially diverse, only two African Americans had run for Council in the 30 years preceding the 2009 election, one of whom had withdrawn before the election. In June 2008, the United States Department of Justice opened an investigation into the city's election system.

In 2008, the city government hosted three public community meetings regarding election reform, in concert with the ACLU, NAACP, and FairVote. Over 100 residents attended the forums, including one of the unsuccessful African American candidates, Jeanette Gordy, who said, "My concern is that people don't get off their royal behinds. By going to meetings I got what I wanted and found out I had power as a citizen."

In 2009, the city implemented several election reforms with the goal of increasing diversity: increasing the city council from five to seven members, adding another precinct in Greenbelt East to shorten voter lines, and amending the city charter to allow early voting.

In the election held November 3, 2009, Emmett Jordan, an African American, was chosen by 75% of voters, electing him to the Council as Mayor Pro Tem, the second-highest city official. Voter turnout increased from 1,898 to 2,399 voters (a 26% increase in ballots cast) from 2007 to 2009.

In the election held November 5, 2013, Emmett Jordan was chosen by 77% of voters, and receiving highest vote count was then elected Mayor by the council.

=== County government ===
Prince George's County Police Department District 1 Station in Hyattsville; District 2 Station in Brock Hall CDP, with a Bowie postal address; and District 6 Station in Beltsville CDP serve the community.

=== Federal government ===
- The United States Department of the Interior's National Park Service manages and operates Greenbelt Park.
- The United States Postal Service operates the Greenbelt Post Office on Ora Glen Dr.

== Greenbelt Historic District ==
The federally planned and constructed inner core of the city was designated as the Greenbelt Historic District by the Maryland Historical Trust, and subsequently placed on the National Park Service's maintained National Register of Historic Places on November 25, 1980. The historic district was elevated to National Historic Landmark District status on February 18, 1997. The district contains Roosevelt Center (originally named simply The Center, and later renamed in honor of President Roosevelt) and many buildings in the Art Deco style. Roosevelt Center contains the Greenbelt Co-op Supermarket and Pharmacy (the Co-op), which opened in 1984, and the original, historic Old Greenbelt Theatre, while also adding the Greenbelt Arts Center (located underneath the Co-op, in what was previously the city's bowling alley), and additional new businesses such as the New Deal Cafe, with its name honoring the origins of its location. Both the Co-op and the New Deal Cafe carry on a tradition from the city's inception, as they operate as non-profit cooperative membership corporations.

== Education ==
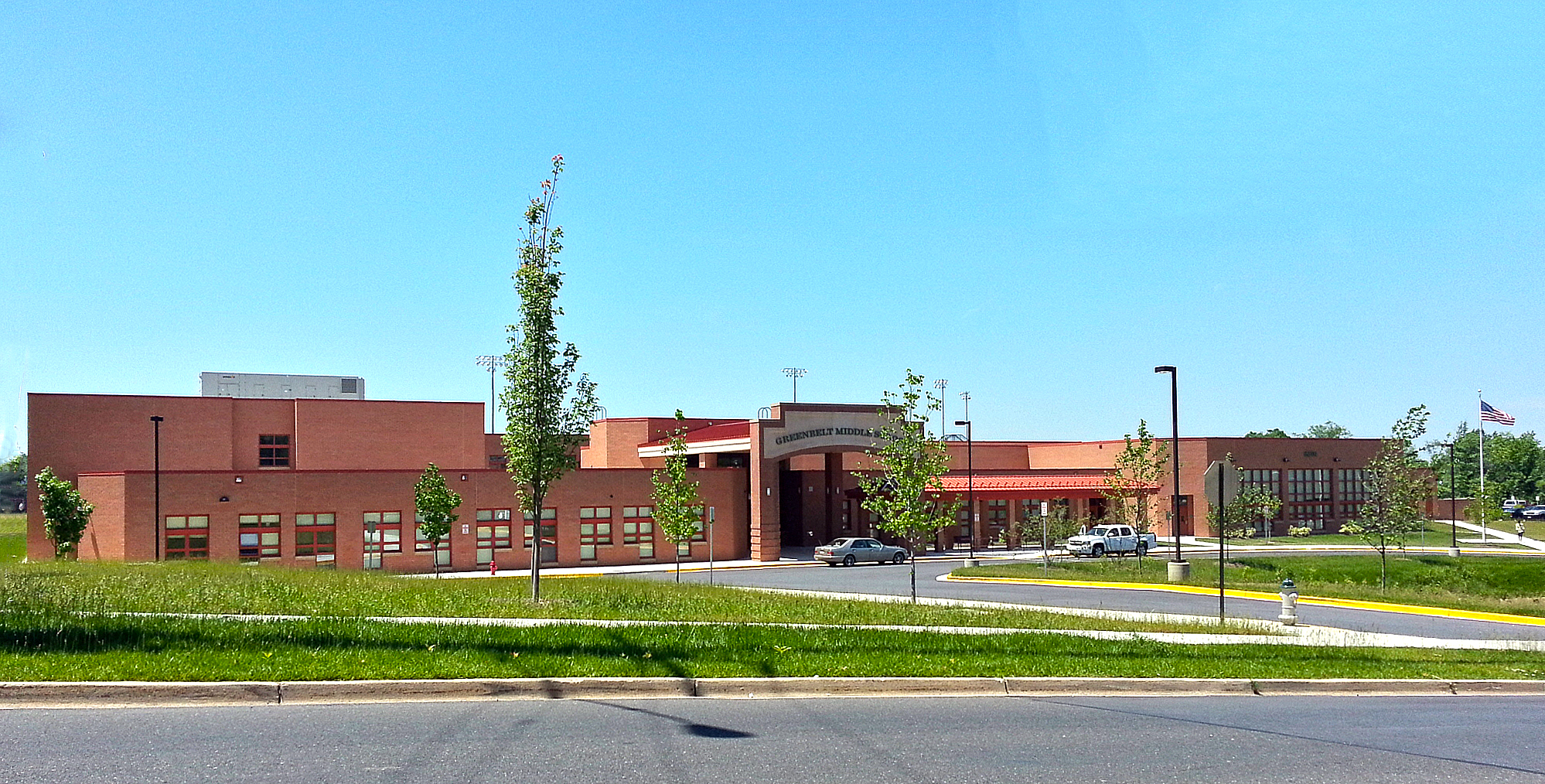
Greenbelt Middle School

Greenbelt is served by Prince George's County Public Schools (PGCPS).

There are three public elementary schools serving sections of Greenbelt:

- Greenbelt Elementary School (Greenbelt)
- Magnolia Elementary School (unincorporated Prince George's County, Lanham address)
- Springhill Lake Elementary School (Greenbelt)

All of Greenbelt is served by Greenbelt Middle School (Greenbelt), which includes a Talented and Gifted magnet program.

All of Greenbelt is served by Eleanor Roosevelt High School (Greenbelt), a school which includes a Science and Technology magnet program and an AP Capstone program.

There is a public magnet school within the City:

- Dora Kennedy French Immersion School (Greenbelt), which serves K through 8th grade students. The school uses language immersion with instruction in the French language.

There are no private schools within the City of Greenbelt. There is a Catholic school in nearby Lanham CDP, Academy of Saint Matthias the Apostle.

=== History of schools ===
The Lanham Act was used to build North End Elementary School. The original Greenbelt High School building (later used for Greenbelt Junior High, Greenbelt Middle, and currently Dora Kennedy French Immersion School) opened in c. 1937. Originally, the Federal Works Agency controlled North End Elementary School, Greenbelt High School, and the Center School. High Point High School, in Beltsville, opened in fall 1954, and began serving students from Greenbelt. The former Greenbelt High School then became Greenbelt Junior High School. The county bought Center School for $260,000, after the federal government renovated it in July 1958. The county also bought Greenbelt Junior High and North End Elementary. Eleanor Roosevelt High was scheduled to open in fall 1976. The new Greenbelt Middle School opened on August 20, 2012.

=== Public libraries ===
Greenbelt is served by the Greenbelt Branch of the Prince George's County Memorial Library System.

== Notable people ==
- Abraham Chasanow, government employee
- Erin Harpe, lead singer of Erin Harpe & the Delta Swingers
- Tom Poston, actor and member of one of the first families to move to Greenbelt
- Isaiah Prince, offensive lineman for the Ohio State University and the Cincinnati Bengals
- Phyllis Richman, restaurant critic for The Washington Post from 1976 to 2000
- Dorothy Sucher, author
- Steve Rochinski, jazz guitarist, recording artist, composer/arranger, educator, and author
- Rosa Salazar, actress
- Joe Pug, musician

== Economy ==
=== Top employers ===
According to Greenbelt's 2018 Comprehensive Annual Financial Report, the top employers in the city were:

Number	Employer	Employees
1	City of Greenbelt	463
2	Bozzuto Group	460
3	Eleanor Roosevelt High School	350
4	Burlington Stores, Inc.	229
5	Springhill Lake Hotel Partners, LLC	148
6	Paradyme Management Inc.	134
7	Martin's	130
8	Giant Food of Maryland, LLC	126
9	Greenbelt Middle School	123
10	ATA Aerospace, LLC	116

Note that data was taken from only employers who made information available, and the list does not include the US Federal Government (including NASA's Goddard Space Flight Center adjacent to Greenbelt).

In November 2023, the General Services Administration (GSA) announced that FBI was consolidating offices in Greenbelt. It is a huge project, next to the Metro station, to serve 7,500 staff. Besides the FBI complex, substantial development around the Metro station is planned. It is 13 miles (20 kilometers) northeast of the District. Site selection has been a 10 year project. The state of Virginia has challenged the choice, putting the Inspector General to work reviewing the selection, with no change to the GSA decision as of March 2024.

== Gallery ==
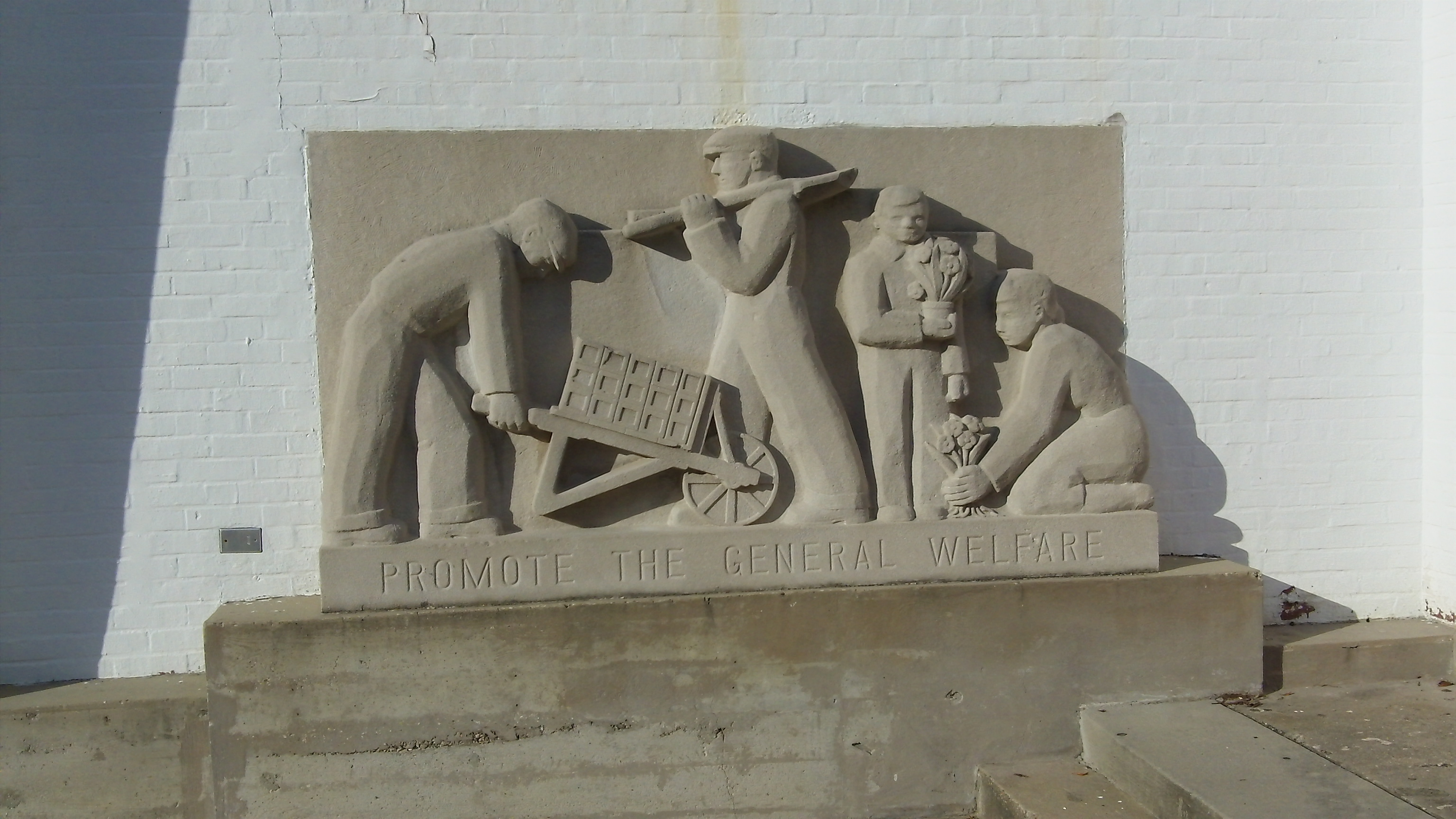
Lenore Thomas Straus panel, Community Center

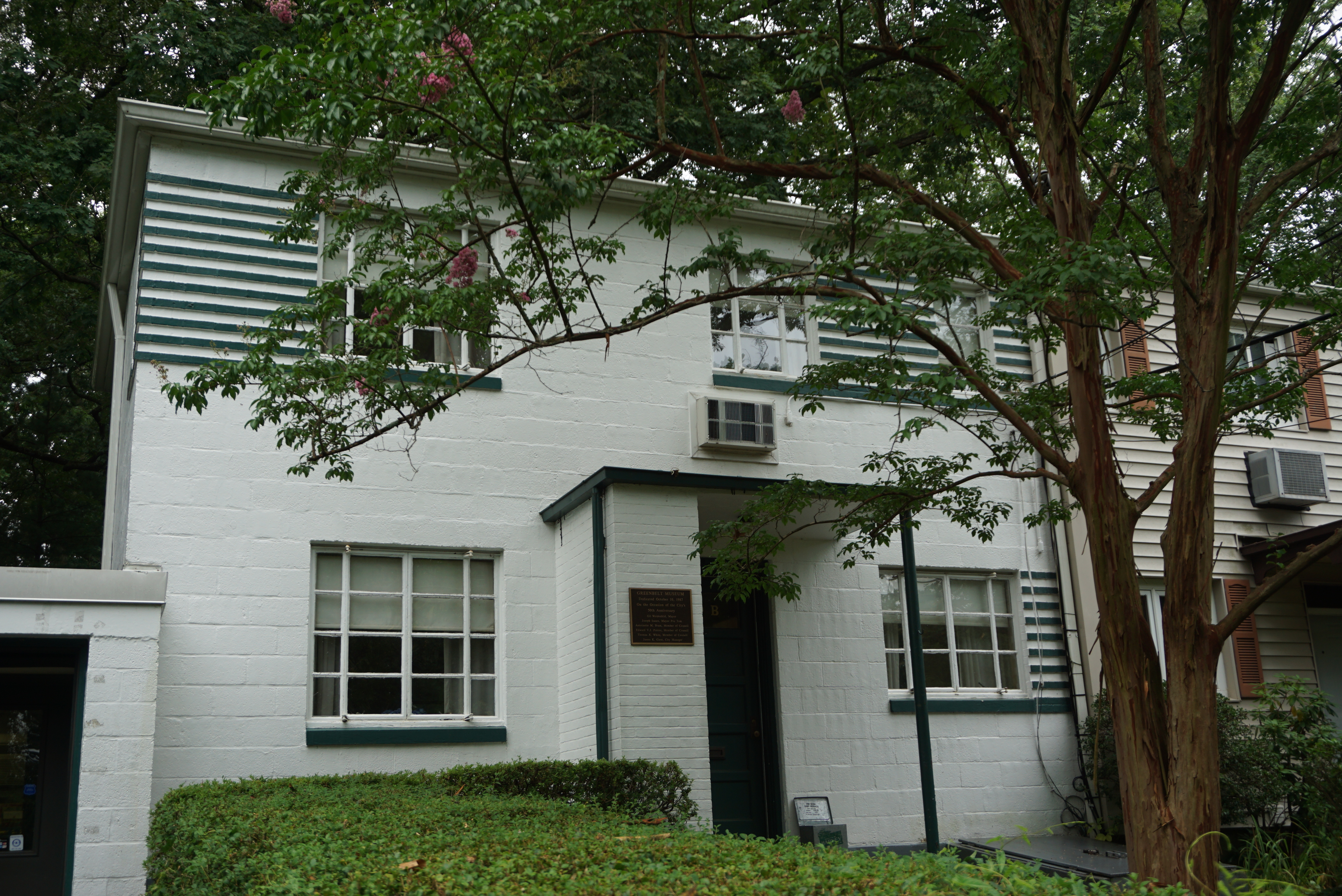
Greenbelt Museum

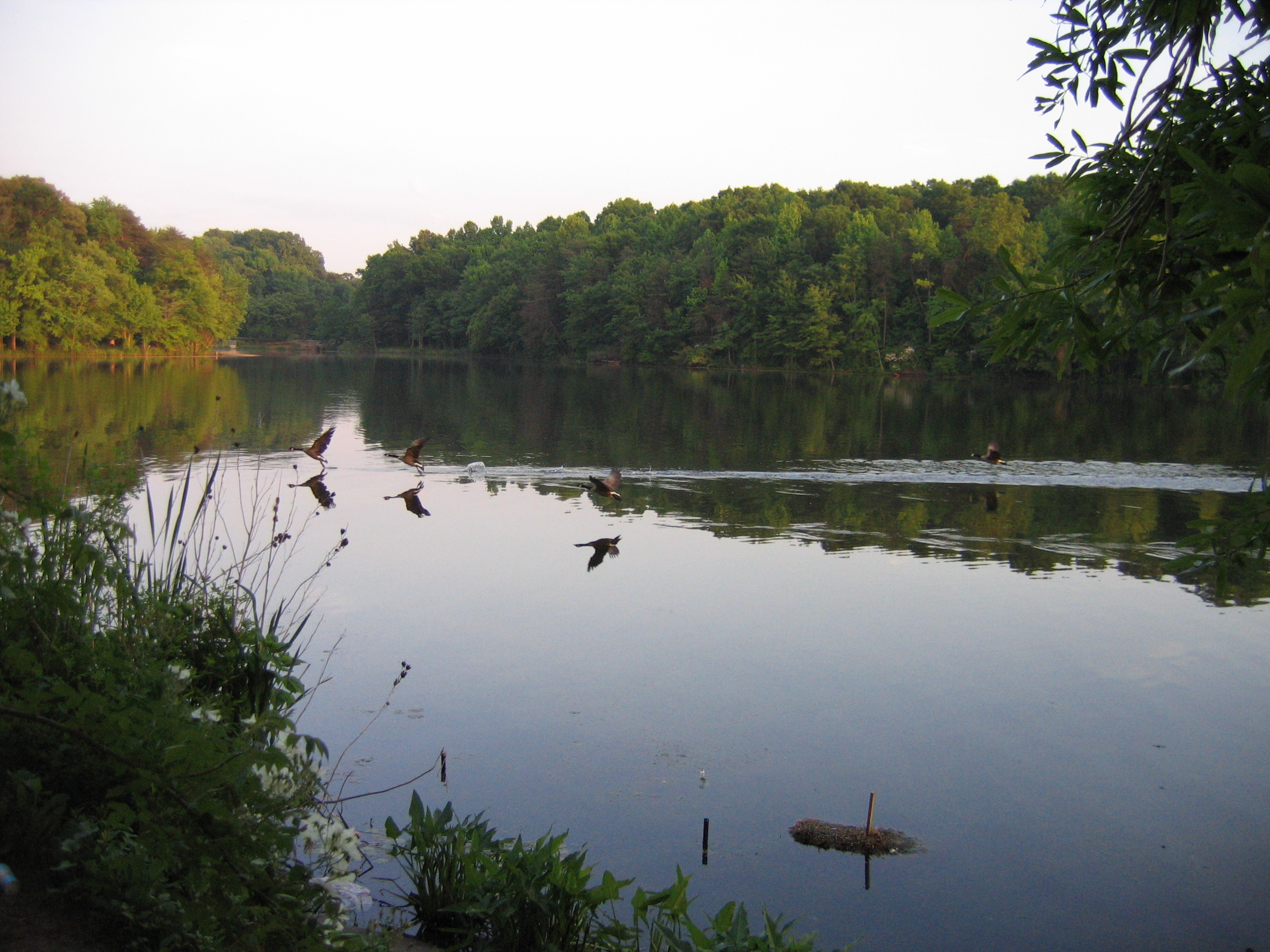
Albert S. "Buddy" Attick Lake Park

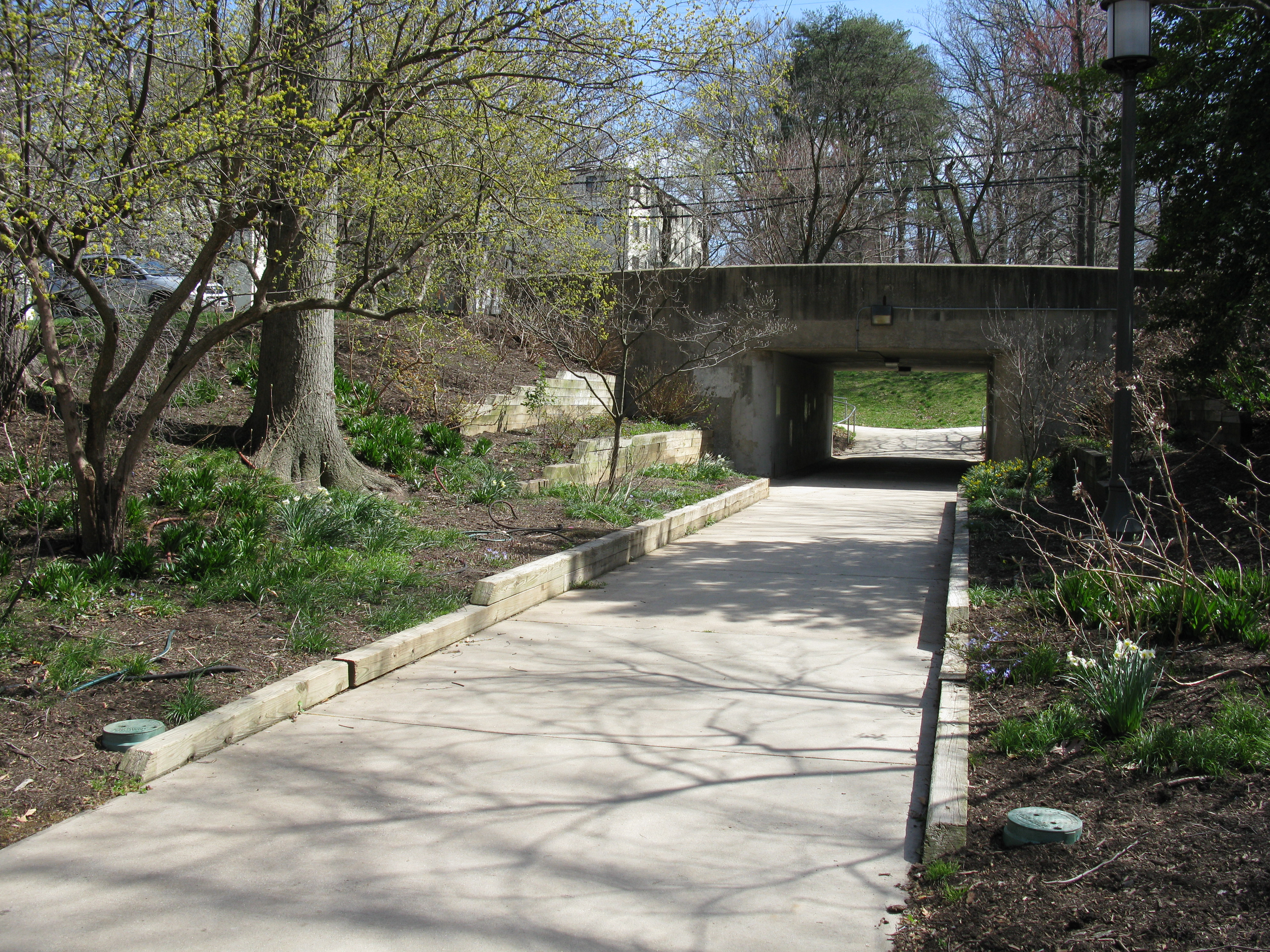
Grade-separated pedestrian path

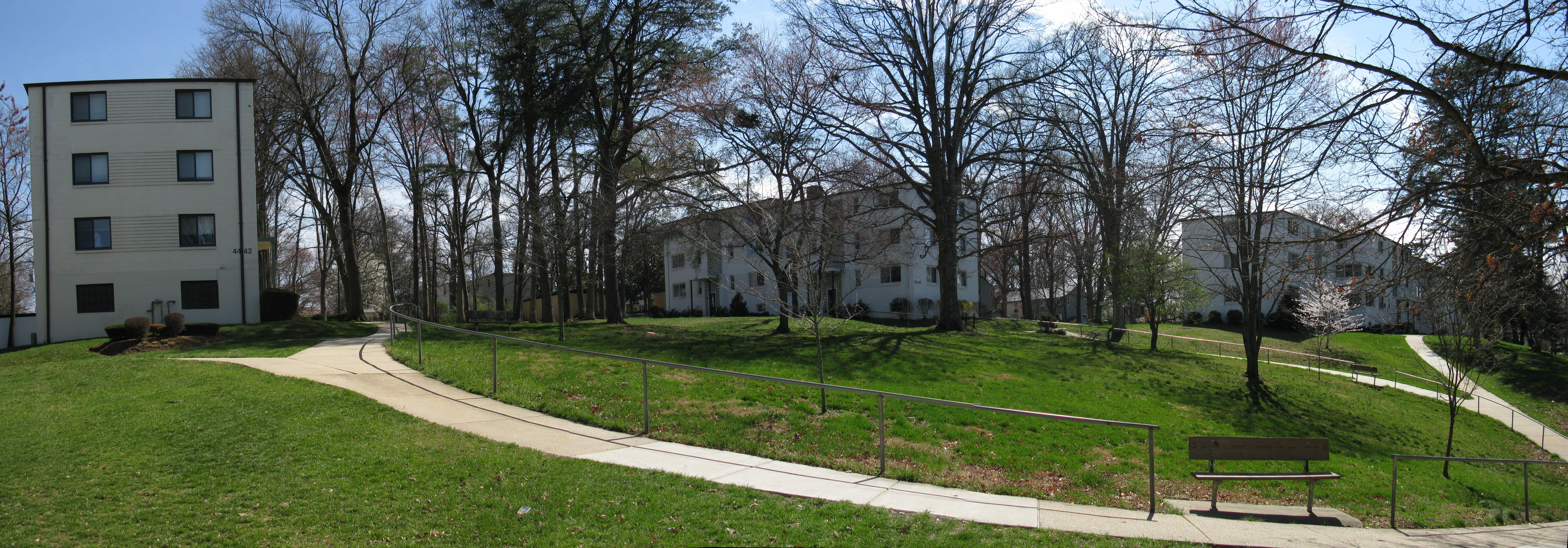
Extensive pedestrian pathway system connects residences

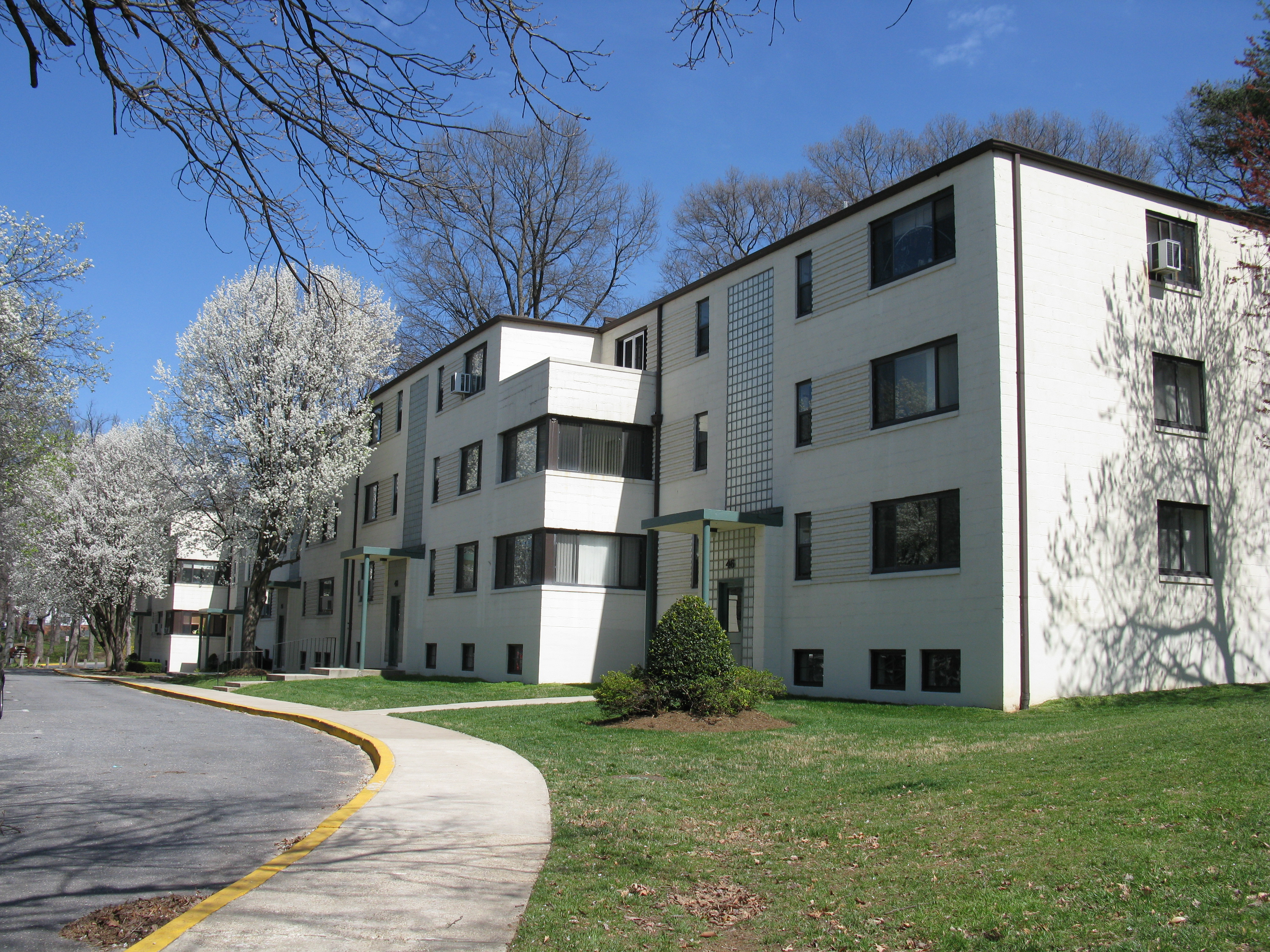
Art Deco apartments

== See also ==
- Greenbelt Arts Center
- Greenbelt Historic District
- Greenbelt Homes, Inc.
- Greenbelt Metro and MARC Station
- Greenbelt News Review
- Greenbelt Police Department
- New Deal Café
- Old Greenbelt Theatre
