= DuVal High School =

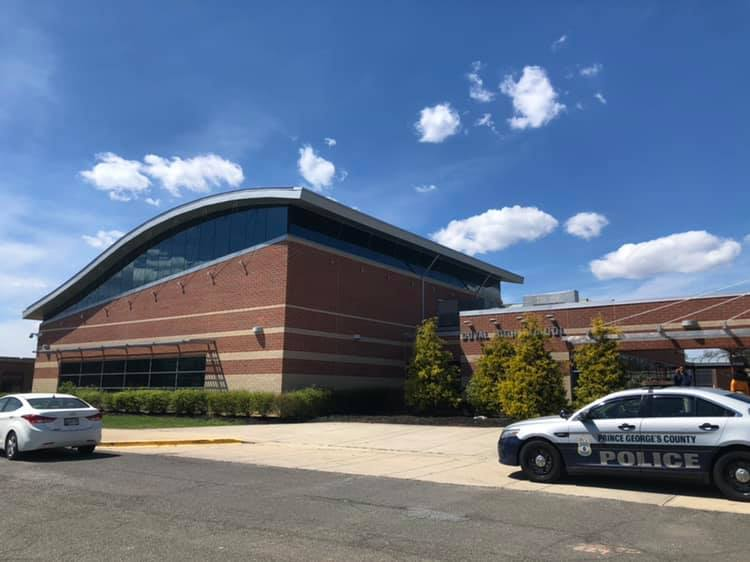
- DuVal High School in 2019

Location
- 9880 Good Luck Road; Lanham, Maryland; United States; 38°59′21.6″N 76°50′16.6″W

Information
- School type: Public high school Magnet Public School
- Established: 1960
- School district: Prince George's County Public Schools
- NCES School ID: 240051001023
- Principal: Lakeishia Strother
- Faculty: 133.00 (on an FTE basis)
- Grades: 9–12
- Enrollment: 2,484 (2023–24)
- Student to teacher ratio: 18.68
- Colors: Orange, white, and black
- Sports: Yes
- Mascot: Tiger
- Nickname: DuVal Athletics
- Team name: Tigers
- Website: www.pgcps.org/duval/

DuVal High School (DHS) is a comprehensive science and technology public magnet high school in the Seabrook census-designated place in unincorporated Prince George's County, Maryland, United States, with a Lanham postal address. Prior to 2010 the U.S. Census Bureau defined the area containing DuVal High as being within the Goddard CDP.

The school serves: most of Seabrook CDP, all of Lanham CDP, portions of the Fairwood CDP, Glenn Dale, Landover, and Mitchellville CDPs, a portion of the City of Glenarden, and a small portion of the City of New Carrollton. It also serves a section of the former Goddard CDP.

== History ==
DuVal High School opened in 1960 to relieve overcrowding from other local area high schools. The original building was a one-story, 38-classroom school situated in the formerly small village of Good Luck, Maryland. The historic primary school serving the same community (the "Good Luck Schoolhouse" or "Glen Dale Colored School") was built in 1899, expanded in 1915 but abandoned c. 1935, and became a private residence in 1938.

The school name honors Gabriel Duvall (or DuVal) (1752–1844), a Supreme Court Justice whose family formerly owned a local slave plantation. The spelling of the name now conforms with that used by his descendants. DuVal held a number of public offices, including serving as the U.S. representative from Maryland's second district from November 11, 1794, to March 28, 1796, Chief Justice of Maryland's General Court from 1796 to 1802, and U.S. Comptroller of the Treasury from 1802 through 1811. Duvall also served on the United States Supreme Court, as associate justice (replacing fellow Marylander Samuel Chase) from 1811 until 1835, when he resigned due to old age.

== School organizations, programs and clubs ==
- Aerospace Engineering Aviation Technology (AEAT)
- Air Force Junior Reserve Officer Training Corps (AFJROTC)
- Information Technology (IT) Computer Information Systems
- Culinary Arts
- Interactive Media Production (MP)
- Networking CISCO Academy
- Project Lead the Way (PLTW)
- Food & Beverage Management (ProStart)
- Teacher Academy of Maryland (TAM)
- African Student Association
- Athletics Academic Coaching
- Board Games and Chess Club
- Circle of Elegance (Etiquette)
- Drama Production
- Drill Team (AFJROTC)
- DuVal Christian Club
- DuVal Debate Team
- DuVal Electric Vehicle Team
- DuVal Future Business Leader of America
- DuVal Robotics Club
- Environmental Club
- Hip Hop Dance/Step Team
- Jewelry Making Club
- Knitting & Crocheting Club
- Leadership Development (AFJROTC)
- Line Dancing Club
- Mental Health Podcast
- Muslim Student Association
- National Art Honor Society
- Peer Forward
- Peer mediation
- Science Honor Society
- Hispanic Honor Society
- Student Government Association (SGA)
- The Lion's Club (Philosophy)

== Notable alumni ==
- Karen Allen, actress
- Madieu Williams, football player
- George Malley, distance runner
- Robert Dennis, sprinter
- Antoine Brooks, football player for the Pittsburgh Steelers
- David Mills, journalist
- Lio Rush, professional wrestler
