= Greenbelt Historic District =

Historic district in Maryland, United States

- U.S. National Register of Historic Places
- U.S. National Historic Landmark District
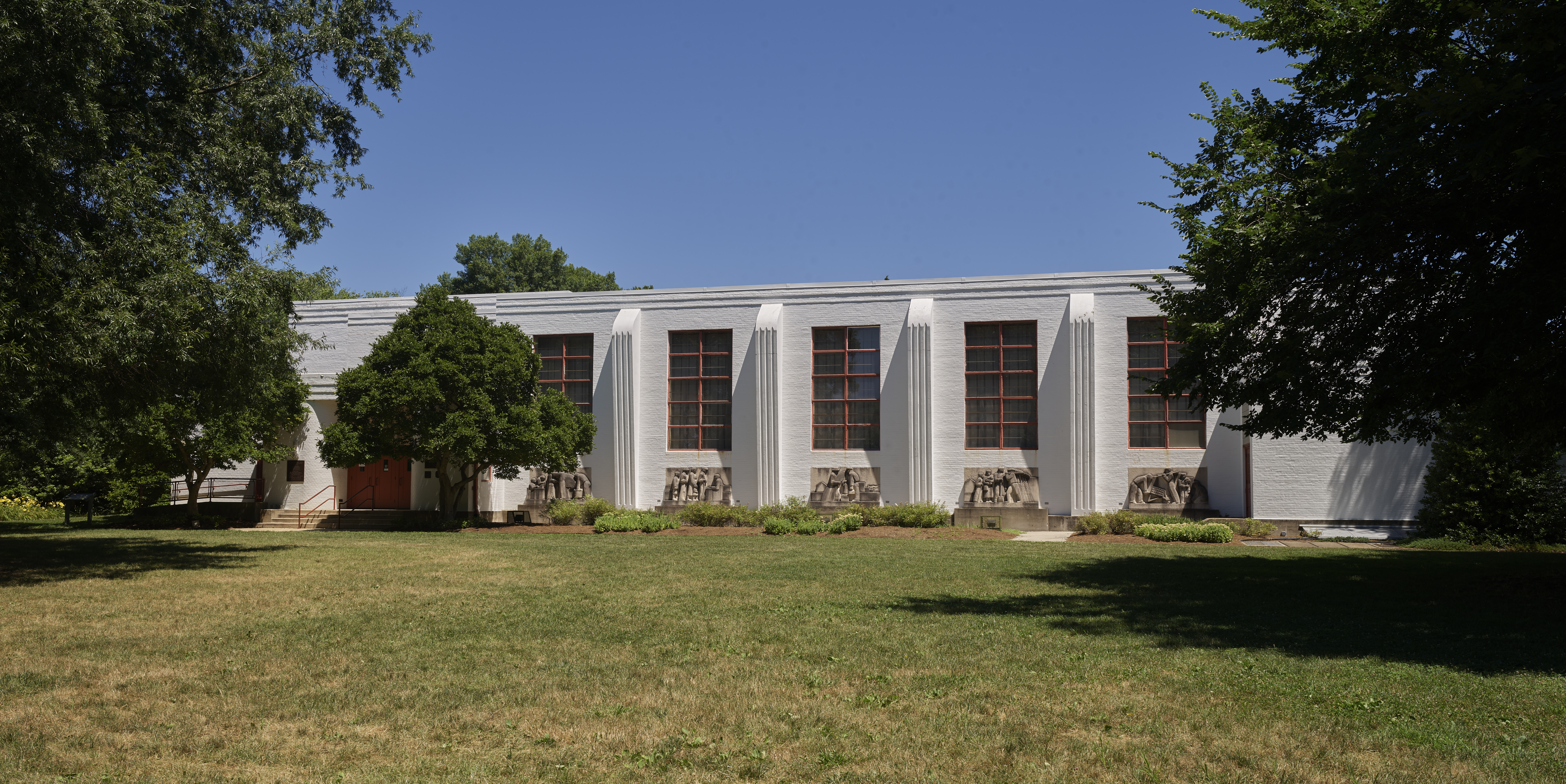
- Greenbelt Community Center (July 2018)

- Location within Maryland Location within the United States
- Location: Greenbelt, Maryland
- Coordinates: 39°0′10″N 76°53′28″W
- Built: 1935
- Architect: Hale Walker, Reginald Wadsworth
- NRHP reference No.: 80004331

Significant dates
- Added to NRHP: November 25, 1980
- Designated NHLD: February 18, 1997

The Greenbelt Historic District is a national historic district located in Greenbelt, Prince George's County, Maryland, United States. The district preserves the center of one of the few examples of the Garden city movement in the United States. With its sister cities of Greenhills, Ohio and Greendale, Wisconsin, Greenbelt was intended to be a "new town" that would start with a clean slate to do away with problems of urbanism in favor of a suburban ideal. Along with the never-commenced town of Greenbrook, New Jersey, the new towns were part of the New Deal public works programs.

Greenbelt's center has survived with few alterations compared with its sister towns. It was designated a National Historic Landmark in 1997.

== History ==
In April 1935 Congress passed the Emergency Relief Appropriation Act, intended to counter the effects of the Great Depression through the appropriation of $5 billion for jobs programs. As a result, President Franklin Delano Roosevelt established the Resettlement Administration (RA) to coordinate federal efforts concerning housing and land, placing particular emphasis on rural poverty. While the focus of the RA remained primarily rural, it was also charged with resettling farm workers who were leaving agriculture in search of industrial work. New towns were seen as a solution to this problem, to be built outside urban areas and surrounded by healthful green belts of preserved land. As many as 3000 of these towns were initially envisioned. 100 cities were studied for new towns, eventually narrowing to 25. Four sites were picked for the first trials: Washington, D.C., Milwaukee, Wisconsin, Cincinnati, Ohio and New Brunswick, New Jersey. The Washington site was to be near Berwyn, Maryland, on land depleted by tobacco farming. 12,000 acres (49 km^{2}) were purchased, and work began in late 1935, using 1000 laborers.

Architects and planners were hired in June 1935, site construction began in December 1935, and Roosevelt was briefed on the plans in April 1936. Wallace Richards was the RA regional coordinator, Douglas Ellington was the principal architect, Reginald Wadsworth was associate principal architect, Hale Walker was the town planner, and Harold Bursley was the engineering designer. The design team described areas for group housing, single-family residences, light and heavy industry, businesses, schools and parks. beyond the original town area, planned for 4000 families, two more areas were reserved for 3000 families each, with capacity for 50% growth. Much of the land south of Greenbelt Road that was designated for town expansion has since been transferred to the National Park Service and is now Greenbelt Park, while other areas became the Henry A. Wallace Beltsville Agricultural Research Center.

Within the planned suburban development, 1000 units were designated for white residents, and 250 for African-American residents. A 1,750 acres (710 ha) tract was designated the Rossville Rural Development, and was apparently meant to be an area of 50 farms for African-Americans, based on the old African-American community of Rossville. Both Rossville and the suburban housing for African-Americans were eventually dropped from the plan.

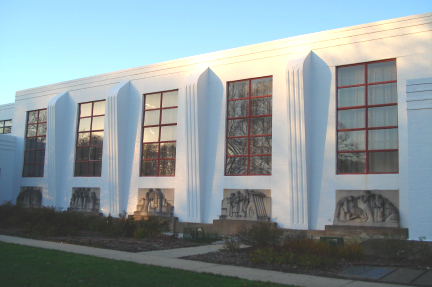
Greenbelt Community Center

Construction involved the transport of as many a 5000 men by rail to the Branchville railroad halt each day. Roosevelt visited on November 13, 1936. However, politics intervened, and amid criticism of the program, the RA was placed under the U.S. Department of Agriculture. In September 1937 it became the Farm Security Administration. By 1938 the greenbelt town was dissolved. The construction cost for Greenbelt was estimated at $13,394,400.

The government began accepting applications for residence in Greenbelt, basing acceptance on income, health, family size, financial reliability, clean living habits and indications of community spirit. Prospective tenants were interviewed at their homes. Wives were not permitted to work, and were expected to stay home and take care of children. The average age of the initial tenants was 29 years. Tenants paid $18–25 per month for an apartment, and $28–41 for a semidetached house.

The town was managed as a cooperative, with a citizens committee to run the commercial center. This arrangement was viewed with considerable skepticism, particularly within Congress. Eventually, by the 1950s, several members of Greenbelt's coops appeared before Congressional subcommittees on charges of communism and monopolistic practices as part of the McCarthy investigations.

After several abortive attempts to divest itself of the town, the Federal Government hired Hale Walker, the town's original planner, along with Harold Heller to develop a master plan for expansion of the town. The new plan envisioned a reduction of agricultural use and an increase in single-family housing. In 1947 the Greenbelt Mutual Home Owners Corporation was formed as a vehicle for the sale of the town. Congressional legislation was passed that allowed the government to sell the greenbelt towns to non-profit groups with at least 50% veteran members. In December 1952 the Greenbelt Veterans Housing Corporation (GVHC) bought 1580 units and 240 acres (0.97 km^{2}) of developed land for $6,285,450. In 1953 the GVHC bought 709 acres (2.87 km^{2}) of undeveloped land for $670,219. Other areas were sold to private developers, and in 1956 the GVHC sold the undeveloped land to cover its loan. In 1957 Greenbelt Homes, Inc. was formed from the GVHC to manage the community, and retains title to 1600 units and 280 acres (1.1 km^{2}) of land. The supermarket remains a co-op.

=== Highway construction ===
The community opposed the proposed Baltimore–Washington Parkway, beginning in 1946, but the road was completed in 1954 through part of the greenbelt reservation. In the 1960s the Capital Beltway was built through the middle of the Greenbelt reservation, destroying the "Indian Springs" that had been a recreational feature, as well as an Indian cemetery.

== Description ==
Greenbelt is laid out as a crescent of "superblocks" containing two rows of frame or concrete block multi-family dwellings. Houses are linked by footpaths and are grouped around central service courts, with the public sides facing the communal "garden" space. A central town common includes the original commercial district, community center and school, linked to the residential areas by pedestrian underpasses. A recreation area, 27 acres (11 ha) lake, and allotment gardens are located beyond the common. The architecture is modernist in style. The historic district includes more than 400 structures, as well as three pre-existing family cemeteries. The original center of Greenbelt has since been surrounded by newer development, causing it to be compared with a medieval fortress town, a walled center surrounded by contemporary neighborhoods.

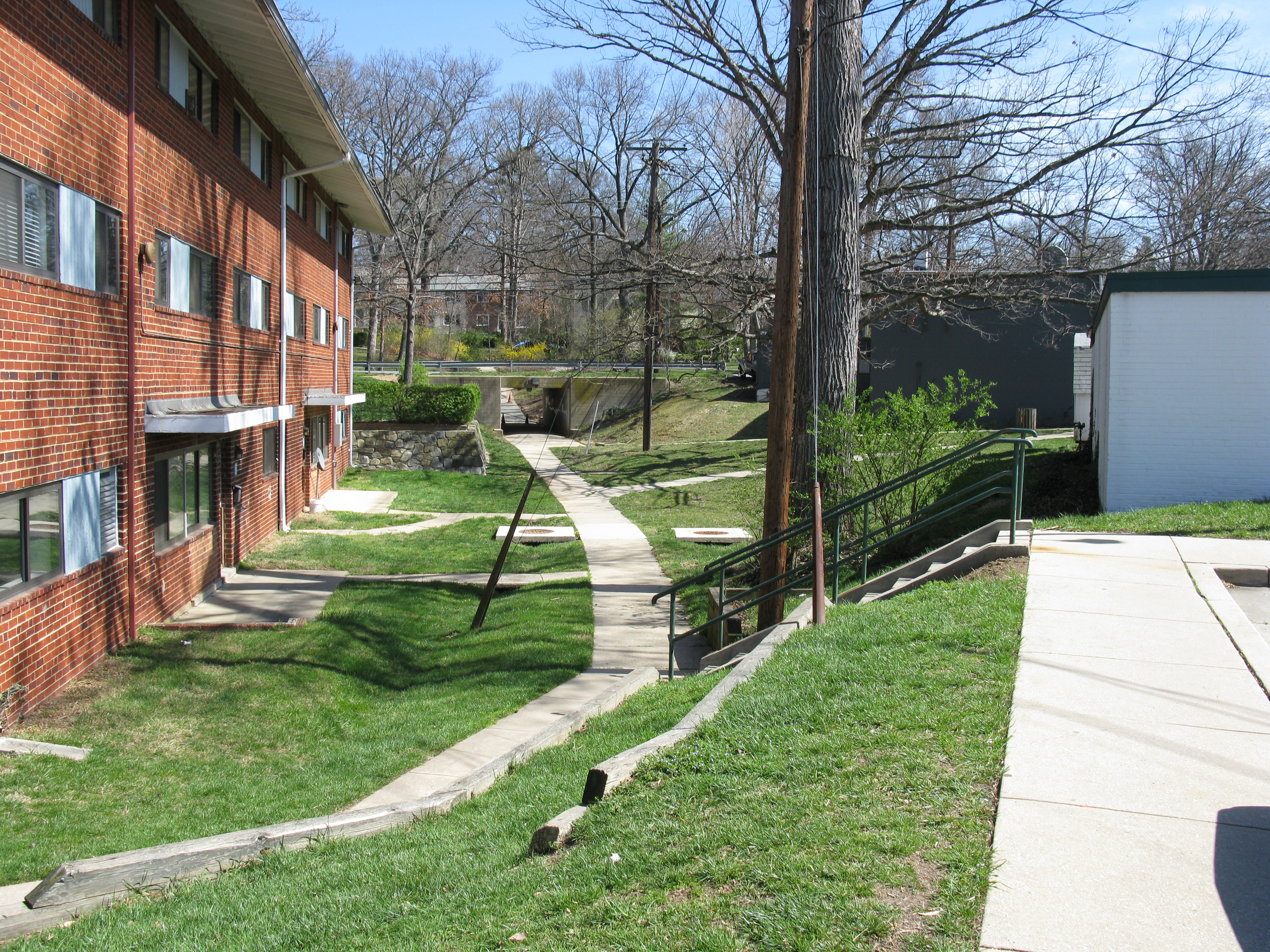
Pedestrian path and underpass

Greenbelt borrowed techniques pioneered seven years previously at Radburn, New Jersey, which turned housing layouts "inside-out" to keep automobiles and service traffic hidden. The architectural design, while modern in tone, borrows details such as pitched slate roofs, plain walls and steel casement windows from the English garden cities at Letchworth and Welwyn Garden City. International Style influences are visible in the white walls and flat roofs of the concrete block buildings.

Landscaping was integrated into the design, with mature specimen trees saved or transplanted during site development. Each of the group housing units had a plot 30 feet (9.1 m) by 90 feet (27 m) between the house and the parklands, cared for by the tenant. On the service side space was provided for trash storage and clothes drying. Landscaping was used to create privacy, and the finished community was notable for the maturity of the plantings.

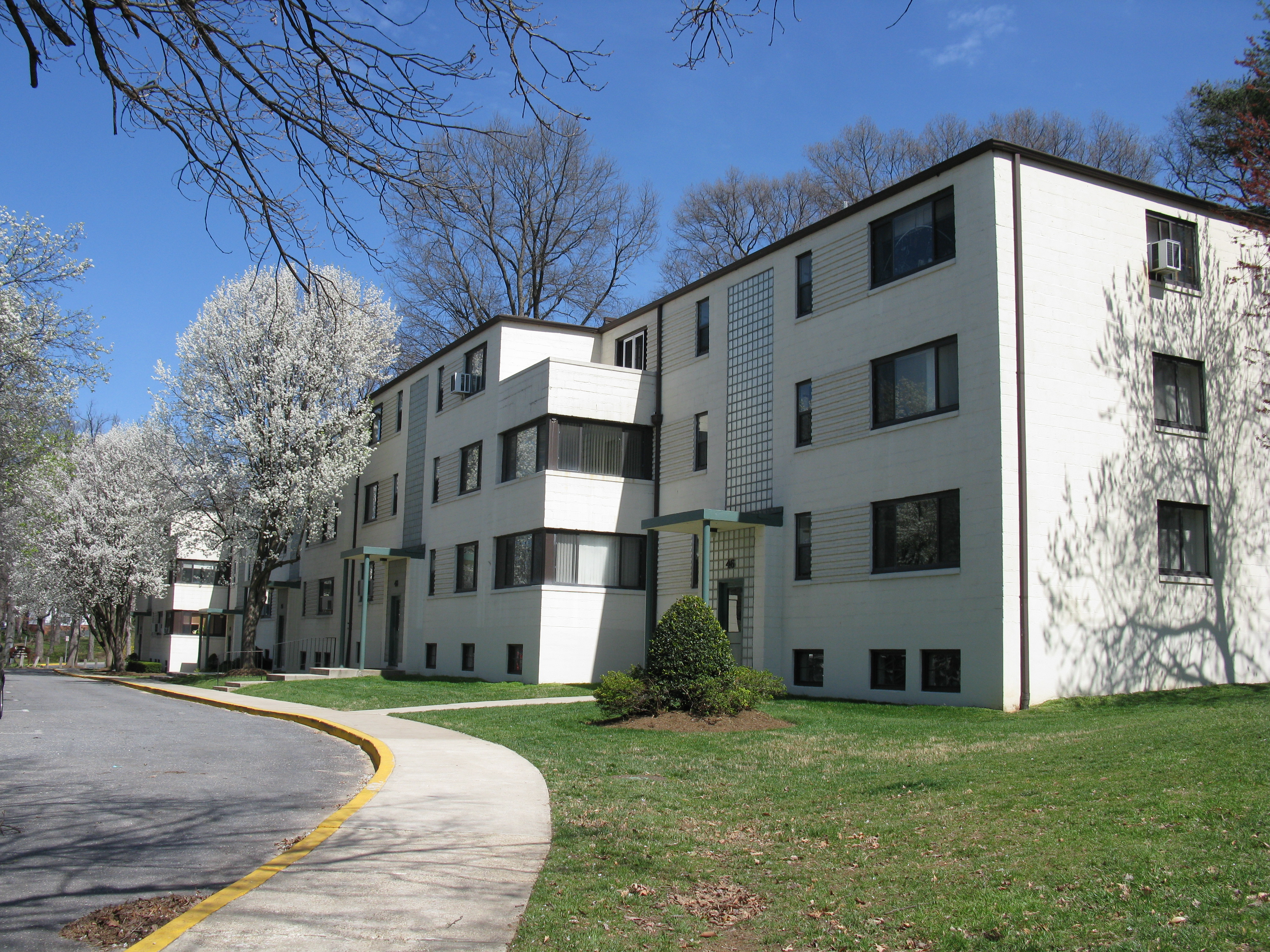
Apartments in Greenbelt

=== Housing ===
A strategy for group housing was followed, the result of questionnaires distributed to potential inhabitants, as well as considerations of the economy of attached units. Units are typically two stories tall, with one-story units at the ends of rows, initially called "honeymoon units." All units are slab-on-grade, with basements omitted as a result of the high local water table. Central utilities are provided. The concrete block units were built by unskilled labor, with the concrete first floor structure employed as the ceiling finish for the ground floor. Pitched-roof units were built using balloon frame construction.

Interiors were highly organized, with few closets and a minimally sized, but well-equipped kitchen. Children's closets had built-in ladders for access to higher shelving. Furniture was offered based on Scandinavian designs. Twelve multi-family units were built, using three standard floor plans in buildings of 18 to 48 units. These buildings were built with basements, offering storage, laundry and children's play space. Unlike the group housing areas, the primary facades face the street, and feature extensive areas of glass block. The International Style features prominently, with flat roofs and concrete structure.

=== Experimental and private development ===
Five residential units were built on Woodland Way as demonstration projects for economical construction. The one story, two-bedroom units featured the use of plywood as a structural material and as a cladding, using a 40 inches (100 cm) module.

The only privately constructed houses in Greenbelt are ten units on Forestway Road, known as Parkbelt Homes. The Parkbelt Homes were built by General Houses of Chicago. These were supposed to be followed by another 190 units under a cooperative ownership plan. The houses were designed to be mass-produced using steel frame construction and insulated panels, predating the similar Lustron product by a decade. Lawsuits arising from rental disagreements and issues of maintenance apparently prevented further construction.

1000 units were built in 1941–42 as "defense housing" by the Federal Works Agency, following the general principles of earlier housing. However, many features were cut back or compromised for economy.

=== Communal buildings ===
The central common area was planned for 1000 families, to be expanded later to 3000. The initial facilities comprised a school/community center, a fire/police station and automobile repair shop, two commercial buildings and a gasoline station. An administration building and a hotel were planned, but remained unbuilt. The school is a noteworthy example of Art Deco design. The commercial buildings use Streamline Moderne motifs, including rounded corners, ribbon windows and flat roofs. The commercial area focuses on the 1938 "Mother and Child" sculpture by Lenore Thomas Straus.

The "Rural High School", later Greenbelt Middle School, was built between 1936 and 1945. Like the elementary school, it is a notable Art Deco building, using glass block extensively.

== Legacy ==
Greenbelt is the best-preserved of the three built greenbelt towns, retaining much of its green space reserve despite the encroachment of development and highway construction. The Greenbelt model provided inspiration to other projects in the United States. Parade Park in Kansas City, Missouri, River Park in southwest Washington, D.C., and Parktown in Cincinnati, Ohio, were built by the Reynolds Aluminum Company Service Corporation as showcases for aluminum construction, and were based on the Greenbelt urban model. The town of Kitimat, British Columbia, was built in 1953 by the Aluminum Company of Canada along similar lines. Both Vallingby in Sweden and Chandigarh in East Punjab, India, were influenced by Greenbelt, as was the British New town Program after 1946. Less influence was felt by the planners of Columbia, Maryland, and Reston, Virginia, in the 1960s. Relate to WWII Manhattan Project planned communities with very similar design esthetic and architecture: Los Alamos, NM, Hanford, WA, and Oak Ridge, TN, among others.

== Gallery ==
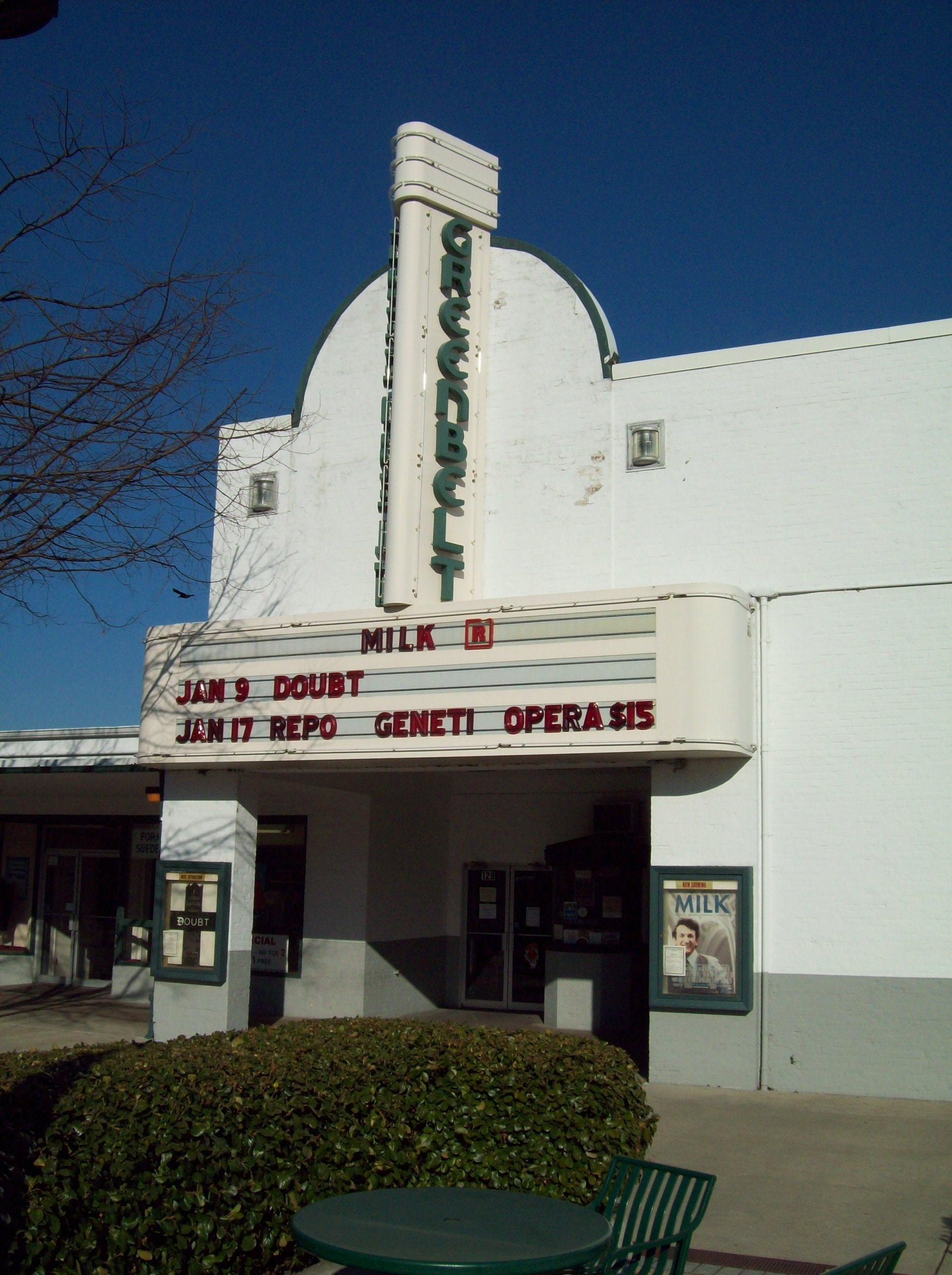
Old Greenbelt Theatre, in January 2009

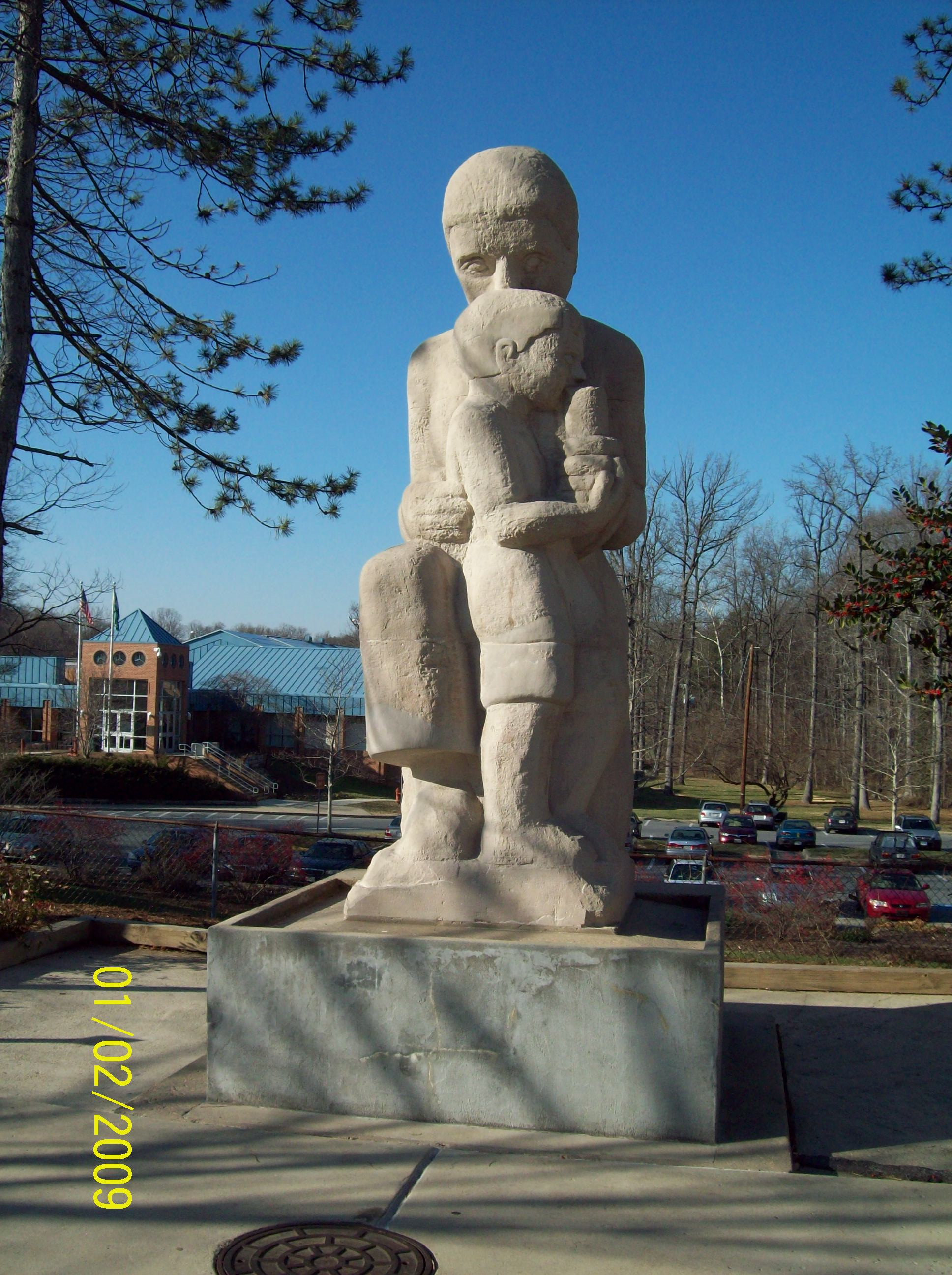
Lenore Thomas Straus, "Mother and Child" statue, January 2009 photograph

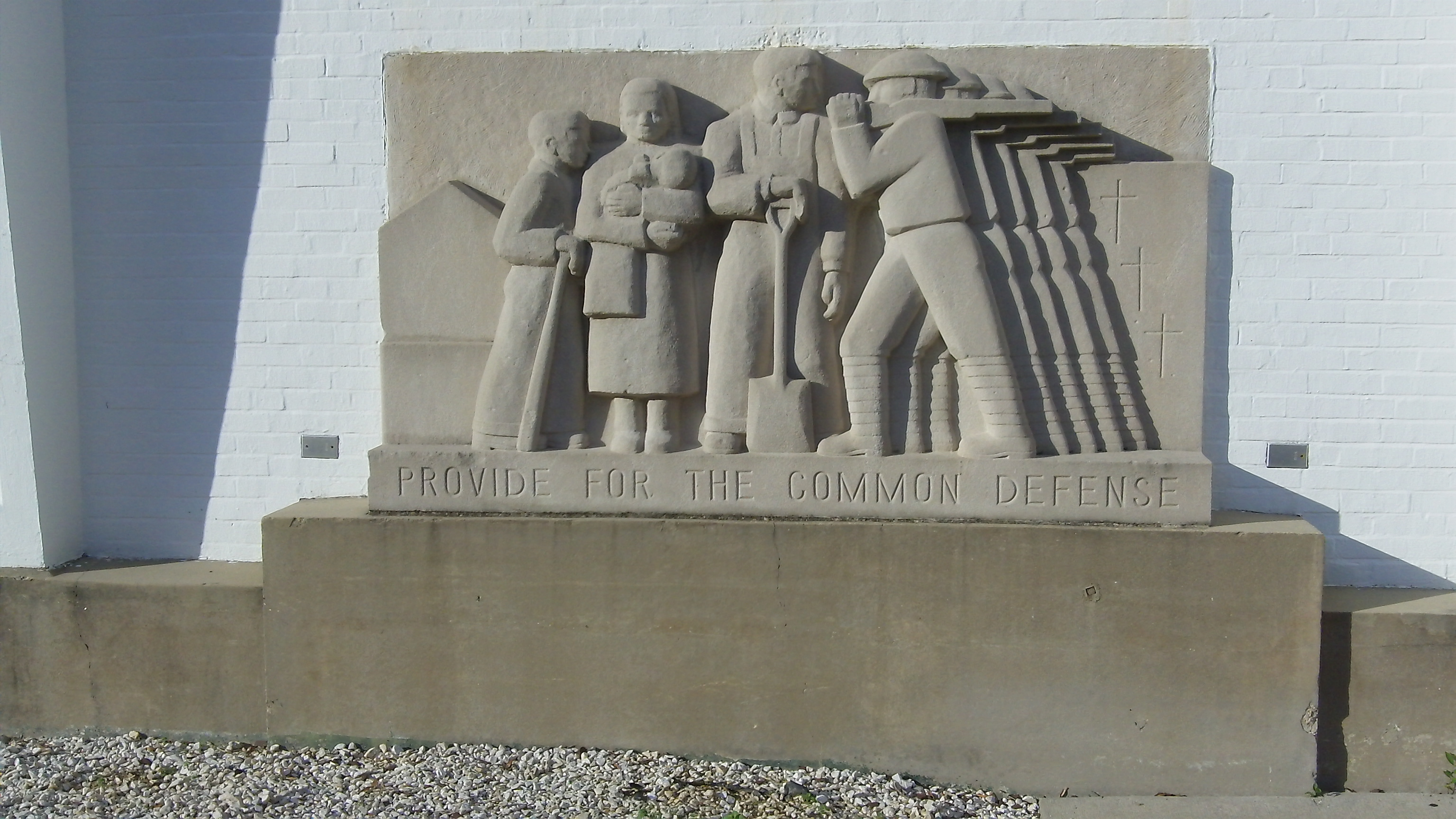
Lenore Thomas Straus sculpture located at the Greenbelt Community Center
