= Greenbelt Arts Center =

Theater in Maryland, USA

Coordinates: 39°0′6.3″N 76°52′35.4″W

The Greenbelt Arts Center is a theater located in the Roosevelt Center within the Greenbelt Historic District of Greenbelt, Maryland. It is normally configured as a three-quarter thrust, and seats approximately 90 people. The theater shows regular plays and musicals, and hosts special events during the year; including free Labor Day plays, and a yearly winter youth musical. It also hosts music concerts, dance and music companies, and displays art.

The theater company of the Arts Center started in 1980, but then performed at the now-closed Utopia Theatre.

== Past shows ==
Past shows include:

- Children of Eden
- Daughters
- Hamlet
- Witness for the Prosecution
