= Greenbelt Homes, Inc. =

Coordinates: 39°0′10.12″N 76°52′14″W

Greenbelt Homes Incorporated
- Company type: Housing cooperative
- Predecessor: Greenbelt Mutual Home Ownership Corporation; Greenbelt Veterans Housing Corporation
- Founded: Greenbelt, U.S. (1952)
- Headquarters: Greenbelt, Maryland, U.S.
- Key people: James Claggett (General Manager); Stefan Brodd (President, Board of Directors)
- Members: 1,600
- Subsidiaries: Greenbelt Development Corporation
- Website: ghi.coop

Greenbelt Homes, Incorporated (GHI) is the housing cooperative in Greenbelt, Maryland, comprising the original houses built by the U.S. Federal Government in 1936 during the administration of Franklin Delano Roosevelt as part of the New Deal, as well as additional defense housing built in 1941 by the Farm Security Administration, and smaller numbers of homes built later. With 1,600 homes, GHI forms the core of Old Greenbelt, and a large portion of the Greenbelt Historic District.

== Founding ==
The Greenbelt community incorporated many design elements that were innovative at the time; these included: curvilinear street patterns, the super block, the separation of pedestrian walkways and the street system, and the organization of neighborhoods around elementary schools.

Rexford Tugwell, Chief of the Resettlement Administration and a close confidante of Roosevelt, advocated for the approval of the Greenbelt Town Program to the president. Once it was approved, Tugwell appointed John S. Lansill to oversee the project and Frerick Bigger as the architect, and hired construction workers in the Baltimore-Washington area.

When the Greenbelt community was built and expanded, the property belonged to the Federal Government, and residents paid rent. After World War II, residents anticipated that the town would be sold. An association of 1,400 residents was formed to buy it, but the remaining 450 tenants hoped the government would continue to subsidize their rent. In 1949, Congress mandated the town be sold, and the sale occurred in 1952. Membership in the Greenbelt Veterans Housing Corporation—predecessor of GHI—consisted of just over 50% veterans, as required by Congress. GVHC gave residents one year to begin making purchase payments or move out. As a result of his involvement with the project, GVHC attorney and Greenbelt resident Abraham Chasanow lost his Navy job as a target of McCarthyism, but was later cleared of all charges.

In 1957, the membership voted to rename the Greenbelt Veterans Housing Corporation to Greenbelt Homes, Inc.

== In popular culture ==
The town and residences which were to become GHI were the subject of the 1939 documentary film The City.

The story of the McCarthyism persecution of Abraham Chasanow, one of the founders of the Greenbelt Veterans Housing Corporation, was documented in the movie Three Brave Men, starring Ray Milland and Ernest Borgnine.

== Gallery ==
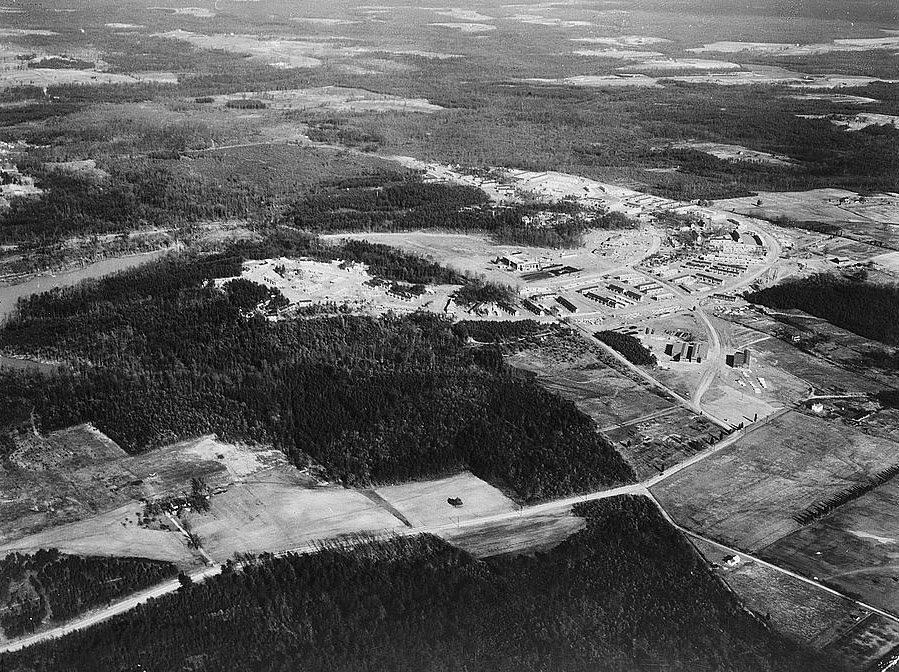
Aerial view of Greenbelt under construction, March 1937.
