= New Deal Cafe =

Restaurant in Greenbelt, Maryland

Coordinates: 39°0′10.12″N 76°52′35.51″W

The New Deal Café is a restaurant, music venue and community coffee house in the historic Roosevelt Center of Greenbelt, Maryland. It is a rare example of a restaurant operated as a consumers' cooperative, as it is owned by over 200 member patrons.

The café, which has a small beer/wine bar in its back room, features nightly and some daytime performances by regional musicians, and sponsors several outdoor music festivals each year, including the Crazy Quilt Festival and the Greenbelt Blues Festival. The café walls are decorated with art by local artists, which is changed bi-monthly. The arts and entertainment activities are supported by the Friends of New Deal Café Arts (FONDCA), a separate, tax-exempt 501(c)(3) organization. The New Deal Café won WTOP radio's Top-10 2012 best music venue in the DC region.

The café's menu offers breakfast, lunch, and dinner options, as well as a variety of smoothies and coffee beverages. The café is under management by the Greenbelt Consumer Cooperative, commonly known as the Coöp grocery store/supermarket. There is beer on tap and a selection of wines, beer on tap, and bottled beer.

The café is often referred to by customers as "Greenbelt's community living room" or its "third place,” part of the third place movement.

Its name comes from Franklin Delano Roosevelt's New Deal, which was responsible for the founding of Greenbelt.

== History ==
The New Deal Café was founded by a group of Greenbelt residents in 1995. In November 2004, over 600 people attended an open house to support the project. From 1995 to 2000, the café operated as a part-time coffeehouse in the Greenbelt Community Center. In April 2000, the café obtained a lease and opened in its current full-time retail space, which was doubled in size in 2005 with expansion into an adjacent space. For several years, it struggled without a kitchen on the premises, and its debt increased. However, in June 2008, the café built a kitchen as part of a four-month renovation, using volunteer and professional contract labor, and contracted restaurant operations with chef Karim Kmaiha and his wife, Maria Almeida, to operate the restaurant.

On November 30, 2016, the café ended the restaurant operations contract with Chef Kmaiha.

In the summer of 2018, the café contracted with Michael and Leah Moon to manage the restaurant operations; their partnership ended in 2021.

It is now managed by the Greenbelt Consumer Cooperative.
