= Greenbelt Cinema =

Movie theater in Greenbelt, Maryland, United States

Coordinates: 39.0014089°N 76.8761593°W

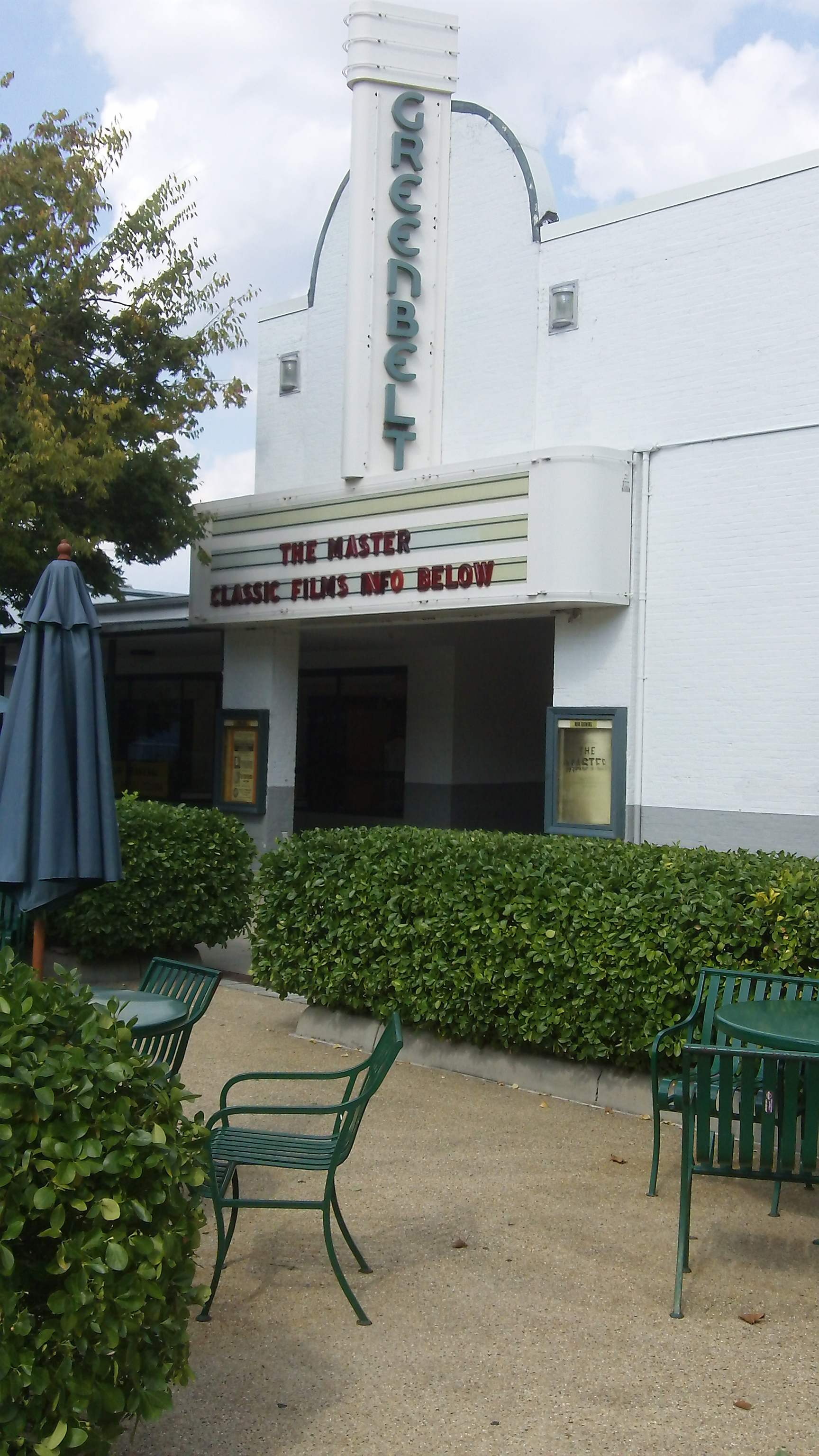
Greenbelt Cinema in September 2012.

The Greenbelt Cinema (formerly Old Greenbelt Theatre) is a historic two-screen cinema built between 1937 and 1938 in Roosevelt Center within the Greenbelt Historic District of Greenbelt, Maryland. It was built in the Art Deco style of architecture, or more specifically, the Streamline Moderne variant that Art Deco had largely evolved into in the 1930s. The theater opened to the public on September 21, 1938, with the first film shown at the theater Little Miss Broadway starring Shirley Temple.

In 2002, the owner of the property threatened to close it down and replace it with a dollar store or other retail establishment. The City of Greenbelt stepped in to purchase it and ensure it remained a movie theatre. The theatre's age meant that modernization and renovation were required; in 2012, it was estimated the Greenbelt Theatre required around $1.5 million in repairs and upgrades. The City eventually did gather the funds to perform major renovations from 2014–2015. The renovation includes new digital projection equipment, a new 35MM projector for archival screenings, a restored lobby and ticket booth, restroom improvements, and an enhanced concession area. The city also assigned management and operation of the reopened theatre to Friends of Greenbelt Theatre, a local nonprofit organization dedicated to the building's preservation and use. Seating 368 patrons in its Main Auditorium and 40 in its auxiliary auditorium (The Screening Room, also called Screen 2), the theater is one of the only nonprofit and two-screen movie theaters located in the state of Maryland.

In 2023, the name of the theatre was changed to Greenbelt Cinema, partially to clarify that it is a film theater, not a venue for live productions. It also wanted to convey the image of being modern and avoid negative connotations of the word "old". The name change was announced at the 85th anniversary gala where home movies of stars from movies that have played at the theater throughout its history were shown.
