= Greenbelt Park =

Park in Maryland

- IUCN category II (national park)
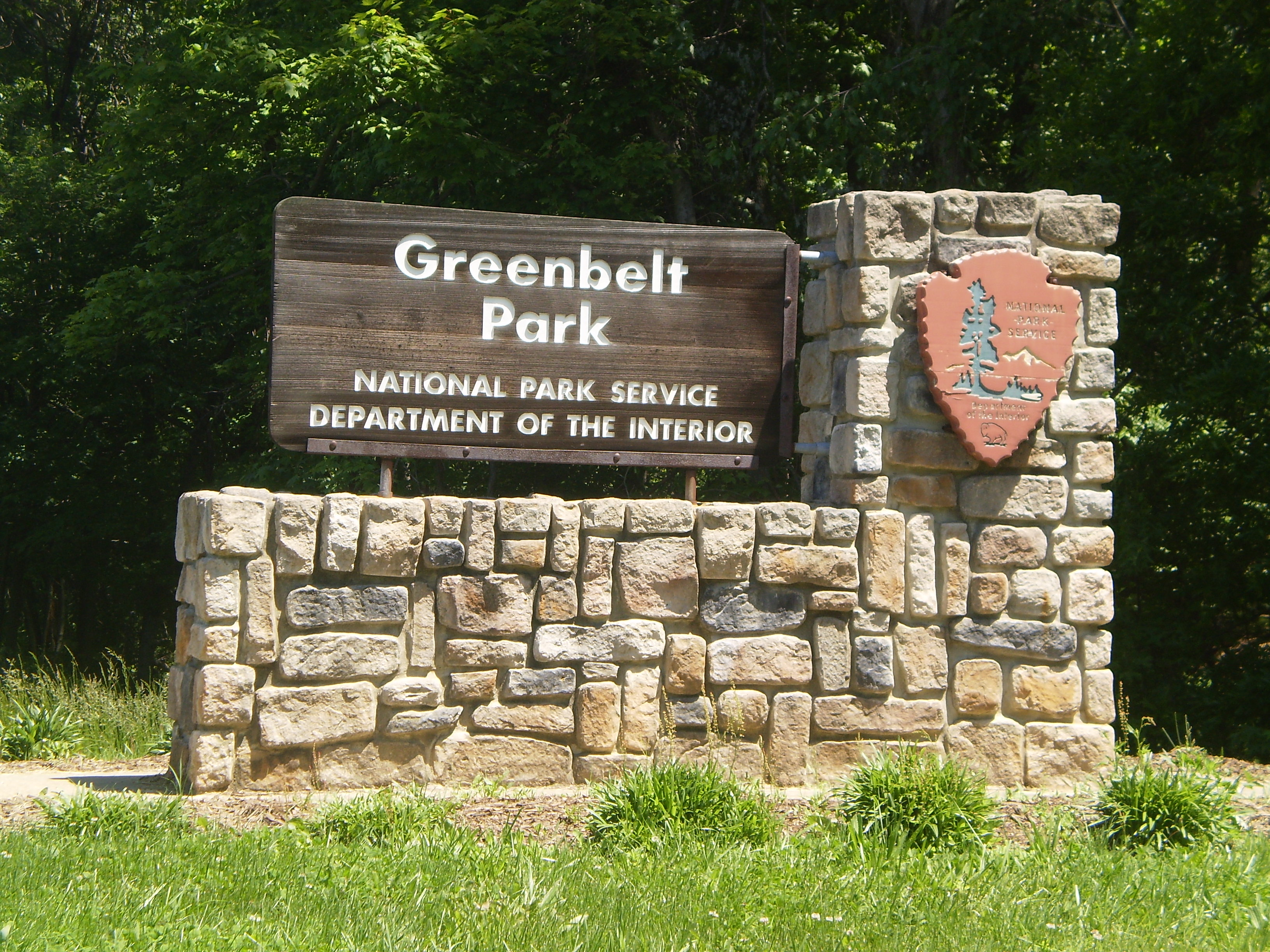
- Sign at the main entrance into the park. Greenbelt Park, outlined

- Location within Maryland Location within the United States
- Location: Greenbelt, Maryland, U.S.
- Coordinates: 38°59′0″N 76°53′52″W
- Area: 1,176 acres (4.76 km^{2})
- Elevation: 79 feet (24 m)
- Established: 1950
- Visitors: 130,314 (in 2025)
- Governing body: National Park Service
- Website: www.nps.gov/gree/index.htm

Greenbelt Park is a park in Greenbelt, Maryland, that is managed by the National Park Service as part of National Capital Parks East. The forested park lies approximately ten miles (16 km) northeast of Washington, D.C., and is situated just within the Capital Beltway (which bounds the park to the northeast). The park land was originally intended to form part of the green belt surrounding the city of Greenbelt. The southern portion was assigned to the National Park Service, thus forming the park, while another section became part of the Henry A. Wallace Beltsville Agricultural Research Center (BARC).

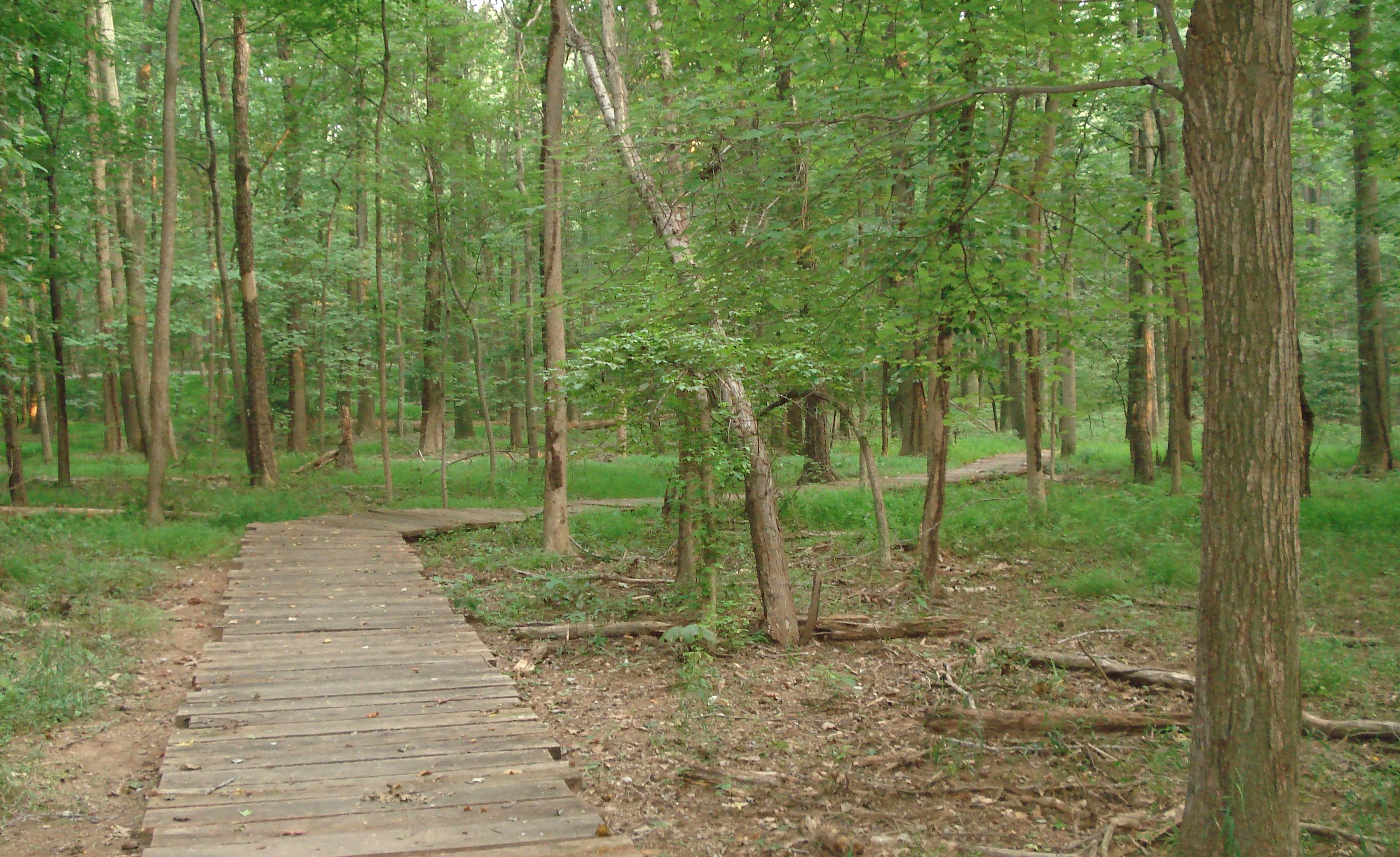
View from the perimeter trail

Recreational facilities include a 5.3-mile (8.5 km) hiking and equestrian trail, several shorter nature trails, numerous campsites, and three picnic areas.

The park was acquired by the NPS in 1950 along with the land that would form the Baltimore-Washington Parkway, which divides the park in a roughly north–south direction. Nearly all of the park's facilities are located within the larger western portion (the eastern portion has one fire road).
