= Goddard, Maryland =

Unincorporated community in Maryland, United States

- Unincorporated community
- Location of Goddard, Maryland
- Coordinates: 38°59′11″N 76°51′11″W
- Country: United States
- State: Maryland
- County: Prince George's

Area
  - Total: 2.4 sq mi (6.2 km^{2})
  - Land: 2.4 sq mi (6.2 km^{2})
  - Water: 0 sq mi (0.0 km^{2})
- Elevation: 180 ft (55 m)

Population (2000)
  - Total: 5,554
  - Density: 2,300/sq mi (900/km^{2})
- Time zone: UTC−5 (Eastern (EST))
  - Summer (DST): UTC−4 (EDT)
- FIPS code: 24-33812
- GNIS feature ID: 1867292

Goddard is an unincorporated community in Prince George's County, Maryland, United States. It was named after the physicist Robert H. Goddard. For statistical purposes, the United States Census Bureau had defined the community as a census-designated place (CDP). The population was 5,554 in the 2000 census. The area was no longer a census-designated place as of the 2010 census. NASA’s Goddard Space Flight Center is partially located in the former CDP.

== Geography ==
According to the United States Census Bureau, the CDP had a total area of 2.4 square miles (6.2 km^{2}), all land.

== Demographics ==
Historical population
Census	Pop.	Note	%±
1980	6,147		—
1990	4,576		−25.6%
2000	5,554		21.4%

=== Racial and ethnic composition ===
Goddard CDP, Maryland – Racial and ethnic composition Note: the US Census treats Hispanic/Latino as an ethnic category. This table excludes Latinos from the racial categories and assigns them to a separate category. Hispanics/Latinos may be of any race.
Race / Ethnicity (NH = Non-Hispanic)	Pop 2000	2000
White alone (NH)	1,602	28.84%
Black or African American alone (NH)	2,940	52.93%
Native American or Alaska Native alone (NH)	18	0.32%
Asian alone (NH)	649	11.69%
Native Hawaiian or Pacific Islander alone (NH)	3	0.05%
Other race alone (NH)	11	0.20%
Mixed race or Multiracial (NH)	157	2.83%
Hispanic or Latino (any race)	174	3.13%
Total	5,554	100.00%

=== 2000 census ===
As of the census of 2000, there were 5,554 people, 2,097 households, and 1,348 families residing in the CDP. The population density was 2,330.9 inhabitants per square mile (900.0/km^{2}). There were 2,210 housing units at an average density of 927.5 per square mile (358.1/km^{2}). The racial makeup of the CDP was 29.94% White, 53.31% African American, 0.41% Native American, 11.69% Asian, 0.07% Pacific Islander, 1.51% from other races, and 3.06% from two or more races. Hispanic or Latino of any race were 3.13% of the population.

There were 2,097 households, out of which 32.0% had children under the age of 18 living with them, 42.3% were married couples living together, 18.1% had a female householder with no husband present, and 35.7% were non-families. 26.9% of all households were made up of individuals, and 3.4% had someone living alone who was 65 years of age or older. The average household size was 2.57 and the average family size was 3.18.

In the CDP, the population was spread out, with 23.2% under the age of 18, 9.9% from 18 to 24, 33.4% from 25 to 44, 24.4% from 45 to 64, and 9.1% who were 65 years of age or older. The median age was 35 years. For every 100 females, there were 84.6 males. For every 100 females age 18 and over, there were 80.5 males.

The median income for a household in the CDP was $57,482, and the median income for a family was $67,000. Males had a median income of $37,253 versus $36,170 for females. The per capita income for the CDP was $25,710. About 1.7% of families and 4.2% of the population were below the poverty line, including 5.5% of those under age 18 and 5.5% of those age 65 or over.

== Education ==
The former Goddard CDP is within Prince George's County Public Schools.

Catherine T. Reed and Magnolia elementary schools serve sections of the former CDP.

The former CDP is divided between Thomas Johnson Middle School and Greenbelt Middle School.

The former CDP is divided between DuVal High School and Eleanor Roosevelt High School.
