= Index of Ontario-related articles =

Articles related to Ontario include:

== 0–9 ==
- 400-series highways

== A ==
- Abitibi River
- Act of Union 1840
- AFL Ontario
- List of airlines of Ontario
- List of airports in Ontario
- Alcohol and Gaming Commission of Ontario
- Algoma Central Railway
- Algoma District
- Algoma Eastern Railway
- Algonquin Provincial Park
- Alzheimer Society of Ontario
- Amherstburg Freedom Museum
- Arkell Spring Grounds
- Ask Ontario
- Association of Iroquois and Allied Indians
- ATI Technologies
- Archaeology in Ontario
- List of Ontario area codes
- Art Gallery of Ontario
- Auditor General of Ontario

== B ==
- Bala Subdivision
- Bank of Hamilton
- Battle of Ontario
- Battles
  - Battle of Lundy's Lane
  - Battle of Queenston Heights
  - Battle of the Windmill
  - Battle of Windsor
- Beatty Brothers Limited
- Bell Homestead
- Berlin to Kitchener name change
- Berliner Journal
- Bibliography of Ontario
- List of birds of Ontario
- Black Donnellys
- Boat building industry in Ontario
- Boreal Shield Ecozone
- List of botanical gardens in Canada
- Brock's Monument
- Bruce County
- Bruce Nuclear Generating Station
- Bruce Peninsula
- Bytown and Prescott Railway

== C ==
- Cabinet of Ontario
- Camp X
- Canada Aviation and Space Museum
- Canada Company
- Canada West
- Canadian National Railway
- Canadian Pacific Railway
- Cancer Care Ontario
- Cannabis in Ontario
- List of census subdivisions in Ontario
- Central Ontario
- Canadian Forces Bases
  - CFB Borden
  - CFB Clinton
  - CFB London
  - CFB North Bay
  - CFB Rockcliffe
  - CFB Uplands
- Chair of Cabinet (Ontario)
- Chatham Motor Car Company
- Champlain Sea
- List of cities in Ontario
- Citizens' Assembly on Electoral Reform (Ontario)
- City Express
- Clay Belt
- Clergy Corporation
- Clergy reserve
- Coat of Arms of Ontario
- Cochrane District
- Cockshutt Plow Company
- List of colleges in Ontario
- College of Physicians and Surgeons of Ontario
- College of Physiotherapists of Ontario
- College of Psychologists of Ontario
- College of Veterinarians of Ontario
- List of communities in Ontario
- Communist Party of Ontario
- Community Living Ontario
- Conservation Authorities Act
- Conservation authority (Ontario, Canada)
- Conservation Ontario
- Constitutional Act 1791
- List of provincial correctional facilities in Ontario
- Correctional Facilities of Ontario, Canada
- List of Ontario counties
- List of county courthouses in Ontario
- Credit River

== D ==
- Deep Geologic Repository
- Demographics of Ontario
- Deputy Premier of Ontario
- Der Deutsche Canadier
- List of designated places in Ontario
- Dennis' Horseradish
- Diamond Estates Wines & Spirits Ltd.
- Dionne quintuplets
- Don River
- Dufferin County

== E ==
- Eastern Ontario
- École secondaire catholique Franco-Cité
- École secondaire catholique Franco-Cité (Nipissing)
- Economy of Ontario
- EHealth Ontario
- Electoral firsts in Canada
- Electricity policy of Ontario
- Elgin County
- List of EMS Services in Ontario
- Essex Aluminum
- Essex County
- Essex Engine Plant
- Executive Council of Ontario

== F ==
- Family Compact
- Family Day (Canada)
- Federal Economic Development Agency for Southern Ontario
- Federal Economic Development Initiative for Northern Ontario
- List of festivals in Ontario
- Flag of Ontario
- Foodland Ontario
- Forts
  - Fort Rouillé
  - Fort York
- Former counties of Ontario
- List of francophone communities in Ontario
- Franco-Ontarian
- Franco-Ontarian flag
- Freedom Party of Ontario
- Freeway Traffic Management System
- French River
- Frontenac County

== G ==
- Galt Subdivision
- Ganaraska Region
- List of generating stations in Ontario
- Geography of Ontario
- Geology of Ontario
- Georgian Bay
- Georgian Bay Line
- Georgian Triangle
- List of ghost towns in Ontario
- Glacial Lake Iroquois
- GO Transit
- Government of Ontario
- Golden Horseshoe
- Goldie & McCulloch
- Gooderham and Worts
- Grand River
- Grand River Railway
- Grand Trunk Railway
- Great Lakes–St. Lawrence Lowlands
- Great Seal of Ontario
- Great Western Railway (Ontario)
- Greater Toronto Area
- Green Party of Ontario
- Group of Seven (artists)

== H ==
- Haldimand Proclamation
- Haldimand Tract
- Haliburton Forest
- Happy Valley Forest
- History of Ontario
- History of Ottawa
- History of Prescott, Ontario
- Hudson Plains Ecozone
- Hummingbird Ltd.
- Huron County
- Huron Tract
- Huronia
- Hurricane Hazel
- Hyslop and Ronald

== I ==
- Imperial Towers
- Imprisonment for debt (Upper Canada)
- Independent Telecommunications Providers Association
- List of islands of Ontario

== J ==
- Josiah Henson Museum of African-Canadian History

== K ==
- Kaufman Footwear
- Kenora District
- The Killam Trusts
- Killarney Provincial Park
- Kingsbridge Wind Power Project
- Kingston Shipyards

== L ==
- La Cloche Mountains
- Labor-Progressive Party
- Ladies Ontario Hockey Association
- Lake Erie
- Lake Erie and Northern Railway
- Lake George
- Lake Huron
- Lake Manitou
- Lake Nipissing
- Lake Ontario
- Lake St. Clair
- Lake Simcoe
- Lake Superior
- Lambton County
- Landlord and Tenant Board
- Law Union of Ontario
- Legislative Assembly of Ontario
- Libertarian Party of Ontario
- Liquor Control Board of Ontario
- Liquor Licence Board of Ontario
- List of lakes in Ontario
- List of lieutenant governors of Ontario
- List of Ontario expressways
- List of Ontario general elections
- List of Ontario Parks
- List of Ontario Parliaments
- List of Ontario premiers
- List of Ontario provincial highways
- List of Ontario school boards
- List of protected areas of Ontario

== M ==
- Manitoulin District
- Manitoulin Island
- McCrae House
- Member of Provincial Parliament (Ontario)
- Metrolinx
- Mid-Canada Communications
- Ministry of Agriculture, Food and Rural Affairs (Ontario)
- Ministry of Citizenship, Immigration and International Trade
- Ministry of Education (Ontario)
- Ministry of Energy, Northern Development and Mines
- Ministry of the Environment, Conservation and Parks
- Ministry of Finance (Ontario)
- Ministry of Francophone Affairs
- Ministry of Government and Consumer Services (Ontario)
- Ministry of Health (Ontario)
- Ministry of Health Promotion and Sport (Ontario)
- Ministry of Indigenous Affairs (Ontario)
- Ministry of Infrastructure (Ontario)
- Ministry of Intergovernmental Affairs (Ontario)
- Ministry of Long-Term Care (Ontario)
- Ministry of Municipal Affairs and Housing (Ontario)
- Ministry of Natural Resources and Forestry
- Ministry of Seniors and Accessibility
- Ministry of Transportation of Ontario
- Mississaugas
- Mississaugas of the Credit First Nation
- Mixedwood Plains Ecozone
- Mnjikaning Fish Weirs
- Mohawk Chapel
- Monarchy in Ontario
- List of municipalities in Ontario
- Municipal Property Assessment Corporation
- List of museums in Ontario

== N ==
- NABU Network
- Natural Law Party of Ontario
- Neutral Nation
- Niagara Escarpment
- Niagara Falls
- Niagara Glen Nature Reserve
- Niagara Peninsula
- Niagara River
- Nickel Belt
- Nipigon Embayment
- Nipissing District
- Nortel
- Northern Ontario
- Northern Ontario Heritage Fund
- Northern Ontario Natural Gas
- Northern Railway of Canada
- Northeastern Ontario
- Northwestern Ontario
- Nuclear Power Demonstration

== O ==
- Oak Ridges Moraine
- Obabika Old-Growth Forest
- Obabika River Provincial Park
- Office of the Fairness Commissioner
- ONroute
- Ontario Archaeological Society
- Ontario Arts Foundation
- Ontario Association of Art Galleries
- Ontario Basic Income Pilot Project
- Ontario Blue Cross
- Ontario College of Certified Social Workers
- Ontario College of Family Physicians
- Ontario Cottage
- Ontario Court of Appeal
- Ontario Disability Support Program
- Ontario Drama Festival
- Ontario's Drive Clean
- Ontario Energy Board
- Ontario Fault Determination Rules
- Ontario Federation of Labour
- Ontario Film Review Board
- Ontario Gazette
- Ontario Geological Survey
- Ontario government debt
- Ontario Handweavers & Spinners
- Ontario Health (agency)
- Ontario Health Coalition
- Ontario Health Insurance Plan
- Ontario Heritage Trust
- Ontario Hockey League
- Ontario Hospital Association
- Ontario Human Rights Commission
- Ontario Legislative Building
- Ontario Liberal Party
- Ontario Lottery and Gaming Corporation
- Ontario Malleable Iron Company
- Ontario March of Dimes
- Ontario Medal for Good Citizenship
- Ontario Medical Association
- Ontario Ministry of Citizenship and Immigration
- Ontario Municipal Board
- Ontario New Democratic Party
- Ontario Northland Motor Coach Services
- Ontario Northland Railway
- Ontario Northland Transportation Commission
- Ontario (Old Order) Mennonite Conference
- Ontario Parliament Network
- Ontario Power Generation
- Ontario Provincial Police
- Ontario Rugby League
- Ontario Savings Bond
- Ontario Science Centre
- Ontario Securities Commission
- Ontario Sire Stakes
- Ontario Software Acquisition Program Advisory Committee
- Ontario Sports Hall of Fame
- Ontario Telephone Service Commission
- Ontario Temperance Act
- Ontera
- Order of Ontario
- Oshawa Car Assembly
- Ottawa
- Ottawa Car Company
- Ottawa River
- Ottawa River Waterway
- Ottawa Safety Council
- Ottawa Valley
- Ottawa-Bonnechere Graben
- Outline of Ontario

== P ==
- Parry Sound District
- Patrons of Industry
- Pedlar People Limited
- Peterborough Canoe Company
- Petun
- Petworth Emigration Scheme
- Pickering Nuclear Generating Station
- Pinery Provincial Park
- List of Canadian poets
- Poet Laureate of Ontario
- Point Pelee National Park
- Poverty in Ontario
- List of population centres in Ontario
- Port Alma Wind Farm
- Premier of Ontario
- Premier's Awards for Excellence in the Arts
- Prescott, Ontario
- Preston Car Company
- Progressive Conservative Party of Ontario
- Protestant Protective Association
- Province of Canada
- Provincial Secretary and Registrar of Ontario
- Pseudo Interactive
- Public drinking in Ontario
- List of public libraries in Ontario
- Pure Spring Company

== Q ==
- Quebec City–Windsor Corridor
- Québec City–Windsor Corridor (Via Rail)
- Queen's Park
- Queen's Printer for Ontario

== R ==
- List of radio stations in Ontario
- Rainy River District
- Real Estate Council of Ontario
- Red Tape Commission
- Reform movement (Upper Canada)
- Reform Party of Ontario
- Rent control in Ontario
- Research Enterprises Limited
- Responsible government
- Rideau Canal
- Ring of Fire (Northern Ontario)
- Ringette
- Royal Canadian Mint
- Royal eponyms in Canada
- The Royal Hamilton Light Infantry (Wentworth Regiment)
- Royal Military College of Canada
- Royal Ontario Museum

== S ==
- St. Clair River
- Saint Lawrence River
- Sainte-Marie among the Hurons
- Same-sex marriage in Ontario
- Sault Ste. Marie language resolution
- Schneider Haus
- Seagram
- Shaw Media
- Sheguiandah
- Short Hills Provincial Park
- Simcoe County
- Six Nations of the Grand River
- Social Contract (Ontario)
- Social Credit Party of Ontario
- Socialist Party of Ontario
- Southern Ontario
- Southern Ontario Library Service
- Southwest Elgin Forest Complex
- Southwestern Ontario
- Southwestern Ontario English
- Southwold Earthworks
- Stonehooking
- Sudbury District
- Sudbury–White River train
- Sun Valley Gardens
- Superior Court of Justice for Ontario

== T ==
- List of television stations in Ontario
- TFO
- Thames River
- The Law Society of Upper Canada
- The Beer Store
- Thunder Bay District
- Thunder Bay (landform)
- Timeline of Ontario history
- Timmins-James Bay
- Toronto
- Toronto Harbour
- Toronto Pearson International Airport
- Toronto Union Station
- Toronto–Sarnia train
- List of towns in Ontario
- List of township municipalities in Ontario
- TVOntario

== U ==
- Ultra Food & Drug
- Unemployment in Ontario
- List of unincorporated communities in Ontario
- United Farmers of Ontario
- List of universities in Ontario
- Upper Canada
- Upper Canada Rebellion
- Upper Canada Village

== V ==
- Value-added wood products in Ontario
- Valu-mart
- Vehicle registration plates of Ontario
- List of villages in Ontario

== W ==
- Walkerton E. coli outbreak
- Waterfront Trail
- War of 1812
- Welland Canal
- Wellington County
- Wellington District
- Wellington, Grey and Bruce Railway
- Western Fair
- Western Fair Museum and Archives
- Wheatley Provincial Park
- Windsor Assembly
- Windsor Salt Mine
- Windsor Transmission
- Woodside National Historic Site
- Workplace Safety and Insurance Board

== Y ==
- Ontario Youth Parliament

== Z ==
- Zehrs Markets
- Zellers

== See also ==
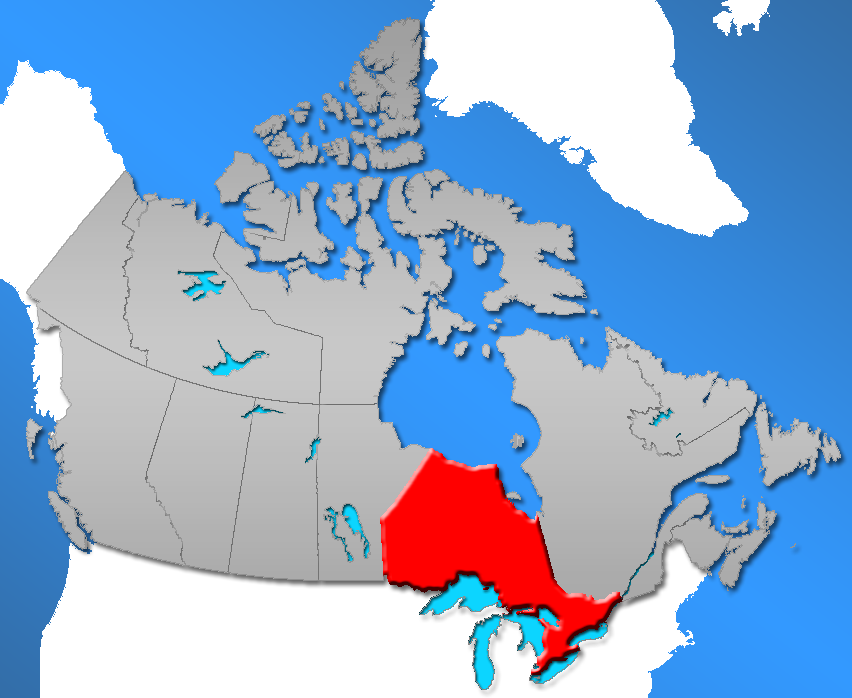
Lists of topics by provinces and territories
