= Fittings Limited =

- Industry: Manufacturing
- Predecessor: Oshawa Steam and Gas Fittings Ltd., Oshawa Stove Company
- Founded: 1902
- Founder: J.D. Storie
- Defunct: 1978
- Fate: Dissolved
- Headquarters: Oshawa, Canada
- Area served: Canada
- Products: Iron pipe fittings, valves, electrical conduits and industrial chain
- Number of employees: 650 (1928)

Fittings Limited was a Canadian iron foundry started in 1902 in Oshawa, Ontario, by J.D. Storie to manufacture cast iron pipe fittings. The factory was in operation from 1902 until closure in 1987. Fittings, together with several other small manufacturing operations enabled Oshawa to be considered the "Manchester of Canada".

== Oshawa Stove Company ==
In 1873, the Oshawa Stove Works was founded as a joint stock company with a $5,000 bonus from the town of Oshawa. The company employed about 30 men. In 1880, new management under J.S. Larke, who accepted a government job that required travel to Australia and left the business to his business partner J. Bales in 1894. The Oshawa Stove Company facilities were housed in a three-story brick building that included molding shops, nickel plating facilities and pattern making facilities as stoves were made of cast iron in the 1800s.

Shortly after 1894, the Oshawa Stove Company went out of business and the factory sat idle until 1902.

== Oshawa Steam and Gas Fittings, Limited ==
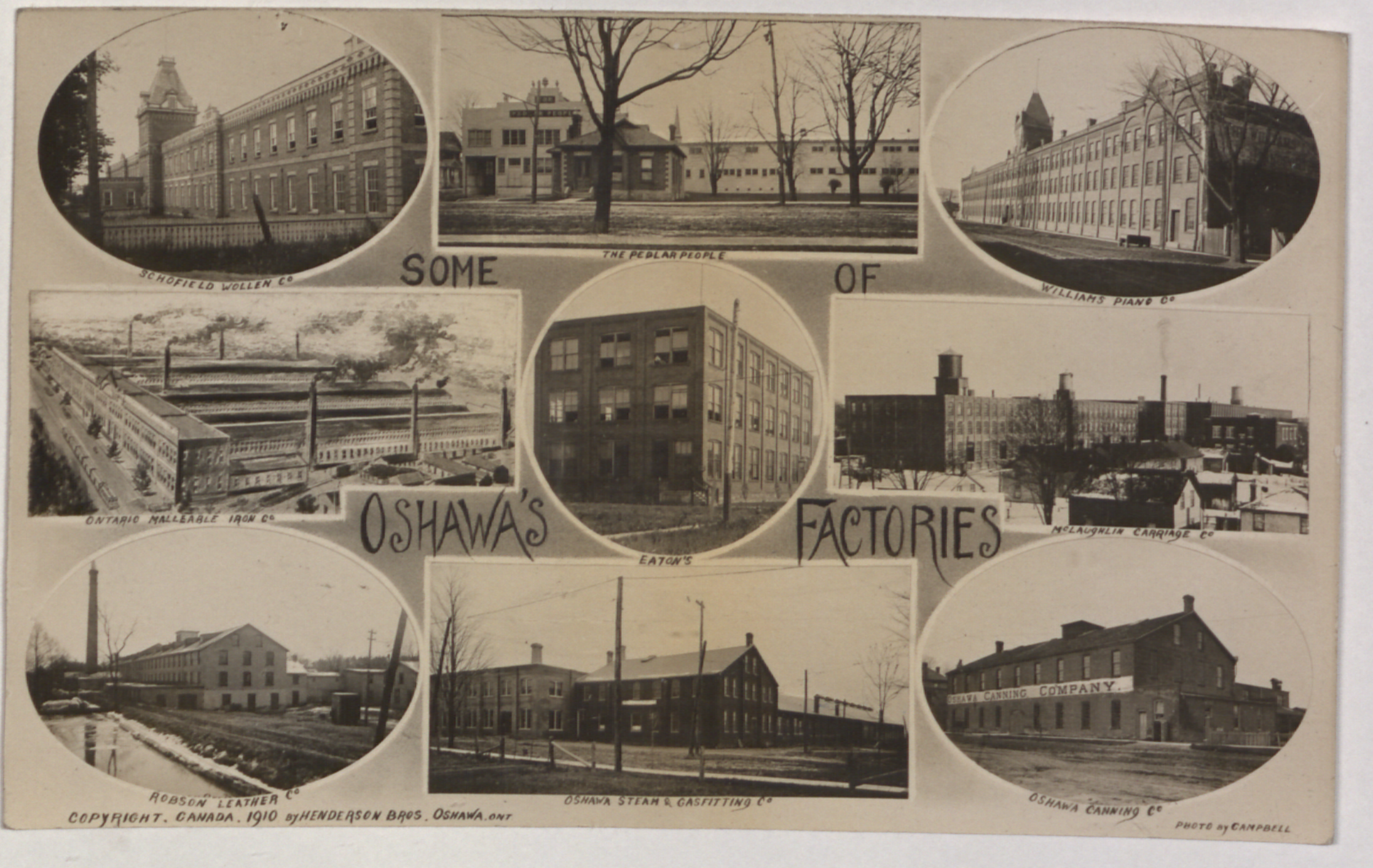
Oshawa Steam and Gas Fittings: lower, center

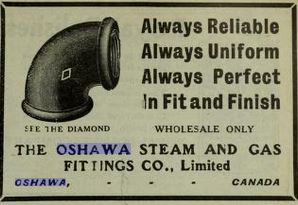
1909 Fittings Advertisement

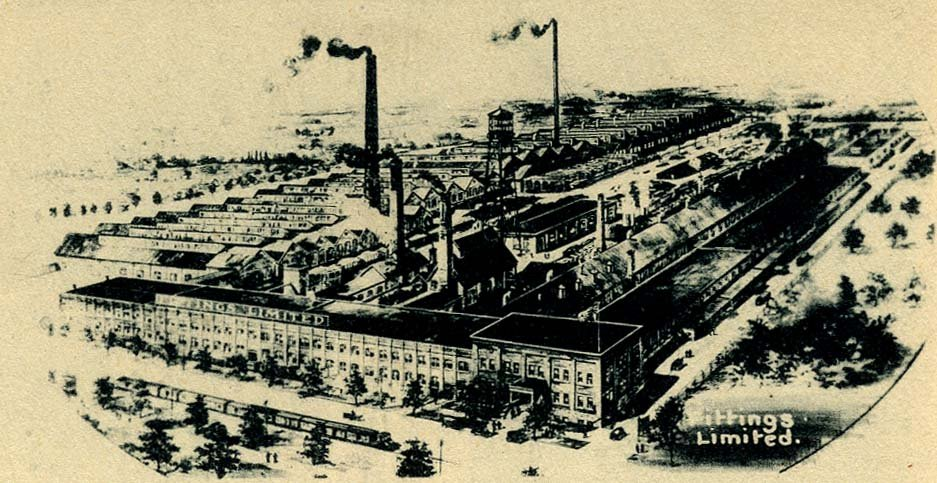
Fittings Limited, c. 1910

In 1902, Oshawa industrialist J.D. Storie partnered with H.T. Carswell and William Cowan, of Ontario Malleable Iron Company to purchase the former site occupied by the Oshawa Stove Company on 135 Bruce Street, and created the Oshawa Steam and Gas Fittings, Ltd. Cowan became the president of the firm; Storie, the vice-president and general manager, and Carswell as the secretary-treasurer. Their intent was to create a firm that would specialize in malleable iron pipe fittings, railway fittings, and chain. In 1910, the owners simplified the company name to Fittings Limited, name that would remain throughout the life of the company.

Growth in the new factory was rapid, starting with 15–20 men in 1902, by 1921, the firm employed 550 mechanics, with a net worth of $500,000. By 1928, the firm had grown to employ 650 men, owned 22 acres of which 8 were covered in factory space. The product line had also grown to include flanged fittings, drainage fittings, valves, electrical conduits and industrial chain used in saw mills and agricultural operations. By 1928, Carswell and Cowan had died and their interests were purchased by Storie who ran the operations with his three sons. In 1936, J.D. Storie died and was replaced by his son, Alex Storie as vice president of the firm.

== Labor disputes ==
Labor disputes at Fittings Limited were commonplace prior to, and after unionization in 1937.

=== 1935 ===
On 30 October 1935, 50 molders at the Fittings Plant stopped work to protest the dismissal of a fellow worker. The dismissed, Harry Krawec, was terminated for using foul and abusive language towards his superintendent. The molders, who had recently formed a "Molders Social Club" leveraged early collective bargaining techniques, achieved wage increases of 22% on all jobs and 150% on short order jobs, and improved working conditions. Daily shifts of 10–15 hours and piece work drove the molders to form their social club. The molders believed that the termination of Krawec was retribution for the recent bargaining activities, as he had been the leader of the club. The strike was amicably settled when Krawec apologized to the superintendent and the workers returned to their posts on 5 November 1935. Tensions among working class employees in Oshawa had been running high since union activity at General Motors of Canada had been thwarted in 1928.

=== 1937 ===
Strike tensions in the spring of 1937 culminated in the unionization of General Motors by the United Auto Workers and of several smaller manufacturing industries such as, Fittings Limited and Ontario Malleable, by the CIO.

=== 1940 ===
In support of a corresponding strike at Ontario Malleable, on 2 April 1940, workers at Fittings voted to strike alongside the Ontario Malleable employees. The employees had had an agreement with management, as negotiated in 1937 when the union was accepted. The original agreement had expired on 31 December 1939 and employees had been working without an agreement through the point at which the strike was called in April 1940.

On 19 April 1940, the strike was settled with employees agreeing to a 7.5% wage increase. Both piece work and time work employees were given the same rate of increase. The new agreement further specified a five-day work week with provision for time-and-a-half for Saturday work. In this time frame, the Ontario government published an annual book regarding strikes that had occurred in the previous year, known as the Labour Gazette. For reasons not stated, Fittings requested that the full text of the agreement not be published in the Labour Gazette. When the Fittings strike was settled, the Ontario Malleable strike was still in force and would continue until 29 April.

=== 1944: war production ===
On 1 August 1944, Fittings employees walked out on a short 23-hour strike citing issues with a particular foreman and the dissatisfaction with one worker's piece work structure; the company refusing to guarantee "target rates", This grievance was significant because the union, the United Steelworkers of America appealed to the National War Labor Board. An agreement was reached between the employees and the company that involved moving the problematic foreman to a different department and a piece work study would be initiated by the company to ensure fair practices. If the company and the union could not agree on a given situation, an arbitrator would be employed to settle any unresolved matters. Due to wartime needs, the time lost was made up by the employees on the following weekend, which was atypical since molders did not typically work Saturdays in hot weather. At the time of the strike, molders were guaranteed 68.5 cents per hour for piece work and average earnings per hour piece work was 95 cents per hour.

As a result of the union's complaint to Nation War Labor Board, arguments were heard by the board, later in August that year. Both parties argued that the other party had failed to negotiate in good faith. In the final report, we find that Fittings employees "feel that they have been unable during seven years of collective bargaining, to obtain any concessions ... and that the Company has never been willing to meet the Union even half-way on various proposals". The company admitted, "our relationship with the Union has been almost at the breaking point on many occasions." The board noted that relations were "not satisfactory".

The report concluded that the company was being "continually threatened and 'badgered' by the Union" and that union by presenting management with concessions obtained at Fittings' competitors, had put the company on the defensive.

== Post-war growth ==
In 1952, amid business growth, Fittings was able to purchase the Canadian Brass Company of Galt, which is currently in business under the name of Cambridge Brass.

== Plant closure and redevelopment attempts ==
In 1977, Edward Storie sold the Fittings plant in Oshawa another "Manchester of Canada" operation, the Pedlar People Limited and Graeme Kirkland. Edward Storie was retained at the site as general manager. The entire operation was renamed to "Pedlar Industrial Incorporated". On 30 June 1978, the new management announced that Fittings would close operations, due to competition from imported materials and plastic pipe fittings. The plan was to close operations on 8 September 1978 putting approximately 200 people out of work. Subsequent demonstrations by unemployed workers were unsuccessful in reopening operations. Kirkland was quoted as saying, "It will take several months to replace this volume (pipe fittings) but the decision to discontinue pipe fittings will strengthen the foundry operation in the future." At the time, pipe fittings represented 25% of manufacturing volume of the factory. In 1982, amid high interest rates and global steel shortages, Pedlar Industrial Inc., which included the Fittings operations, was forced into receivership.

The foundry was bought by another owner and incorporated as Fittings 1980 Incorporated. It continued to operate until 1987.

Fires ravaged the abandoned buildings in both 1989 and 1990 resulting in an eventual razing of the buildings. The site has remained derelict and undeveloped through the present day amid rumors of oil and dangerous chemicals in the ground. Brownfield development interest has been presented to the city council of Oshawa by Medallion Developments Inc. of Toronto since 2011.
