= List of county courthouses in Ontario =

The territorial distribution of judicial authority in Ontario dates to the early years of British rule following the Conquest of New France. In 1788 the government of the Province of Quebec divided the western portion of the colony into four "districts": Hesse, Nassau, Mecklenburg, and Lunenburg. Following the Constitutional Act 1791, these districts became the basis of the newly created Upper Canada. In 1792 the districts were renamed Western, Home, Midland, and Eastern. At this time the government began subdividing districts into counties, and counties into townships.

In October 1792, the Parliament of Upper Canada passed An act for building a gaol and court house in every district within this province. This law handed judicial power to districts and mandated the construction of a courthouse in each district town.

During the first half of the 19th century, the borders of districts, counties, and townships changed frequently from realignments, mergers, and newly created areas. In 1849 the government abolished the district system and transferred all judicial and administrative responsibilities to individual counties. Each county created a county seat, which served as its capital and was home to its courthouse. Following the 1849 abolition of districts, counties that did not possess a former district courthouse had to build a new edifice.

In the 20th century many of Ontario's historic counties were replaced by regional or metropolitan areas. The majority the province's 19th century courthouses still exist and have legal protection on the Canadian Register of Historic Places. Ontario's historic courthouses represent a diverse array of architectural styles, including Italianate, Romanesque, Greek Revival, Second Empire, and Art Deco.

== District courthouses (pre-1849) ==
District	County	County Town	Built	Architect	Notes	Photo
Colborne	Peterborough	Peterborough	1838	Joseph Scobell		
Eastern	Stormont	Cornwall	1826	Archibald Fraser		
Johnstown	Leeds	Brockville	1842	John George Howard		
Kent	Kent	Chatham	1848	William Thomas		
London	Middlesex	London	1827	John Ewart		
Niagara	Lincoln	Niagara-on-the-Lake	1846	William Thomas	County seat moved to St. Catharines in 1862. The building is now known as the Court House Theatre and is used for the Shaw Festival.	
Ottawa	Prescott	L'Original	1825	unknown		
Prince Edward	Prince Edward	Picton	1832			
Victoria	Hastings	Belleville	1838	Thomas Rogers	Demolished in 1972.	
Wellington	Wellington	Guelph	1842	Thomas Young		

== County courthouses (post-1849) ==
County	Seat	Built	Architect	Notes	Photo
Brant	Brantford	1852	John Turner		
Bruce	Walkerton	1863	David Murray		
Carleton	Ottawa	1870	Robert Surtees	Now used as the Ottawa Arts Court Theatre. The courthouse for the region is now the Ottawa Courthouse.	
Dufferin	Orangeville	1880	Cornelius John Soule		
Elgin	St. Thomas	1852, 1899	John Turner, Neil Darrach (reconstruction)	Burned down in 1898. Rebuilt using parts of original.	
Essex	Sandwich	1855	Albert Henry Jordan	Built by future Prime Minister Alexander Mackenzie. Now known as Mackenzie Hall.	
Frontenac	Kingston	1855	Edward Horsey, John Power	In 1875 a fire destroyed the interior and the dome. The reconstructed interior and dome were designed by John Power and his son Joseph.	
Grey	Owen Sound	1852	Bruce George	No longer used.	
Haldimand	Cayuga	1850	Cumberland and Ridout	Burned down in 1922.	
Haldimand	Cayuga	1923	Frank Barber		
Halton	Milton	1854	Clark and Murray	No longer in use.	
Huron	Goderich	1854	Mellish Morrell and Russell	Based on the design of Waterloo County. Burned down in 1954.	
Huron	Goderich	1956	Leonard Gordon Bridgman		
Lambton	Sarnia	1852	Alexander Mackenzie	Demolished in 1960.	
Lanark	Perth	1862	Henry Hodge Horsey		
Lennox and Addington	Napanee	1864	John Power, Thomas Fuller		
Lincoln	St. Catharines	1848, 1864	Kivas Tully (town hall), John Latshaw (courts)	Built in 1848 as the St. Catharines town hall. When the county seat moved in 1864, an addition was made to house the courts.	
Norfolk	Simcoe	1863	John Turner	No longer in use.	
Northumberland	Cobourg	1856	Kivas Tully	Now Victoria Hall. A new courthouse for Northumberland County has been constructed.	
Ontario	Whitby	1853	Cumberland and Storm	Now known as the Centennial Building.	
Oxford	Woodstock	1889	Robert Brookes, Cuthbertson and Fowler		
Peel	Brampton	1865	William Kauffmann	Now houses the Peel Art Gallery, Museum and Archives.	
Perth	Stratford	1885	George F. Durand		
Renfrew	Pembroke	1862	Henry Hodge Horsey		
Simcoe	Barrie	1877	George H. Brown	Demolished in 1976.	
Victoria	Lindsay	1862	Frederic William Cumberland		
Waterloo	Kitchener	1852	Mellish and Russell	Demolished in 1965.	
Welland	Welland	1854	Kivas Tully		
Wentworth	Hamilton	1878	Charles Willer Mulligan	Demolished in 1956.	
York	Adelaide Street Courthouse	1852	Cumberland and Ridout	Served as courthouse until 1900.	
York	Old City Hall, Toronto	1900	Edward James Lennox	York County functions transferred to Newmarket in 1953. Remained as principal courthouse for City of Toronto until 2023 when court services moved to 10 Armoury Street.	
York	Newmarket	1883	Mallory & Sons	Became seat of York County in 1953 as a result of the creation of Metropolitan Toronto. After dissolution of York County in 1971 remained a town hall until 1975 and a courthouse until 1980 when court services moved to 50 Eagle Street. Now a cultural and social venue.	
