= Raymond D. Tremblay =

Raymond D. Tremblay (born in Timmins, Ontario) graduated with a Masters in Social Work from Carleton University in 1969. He is a writer of Métis origin. With a strong affinity to social welfare issues, he currently works at the Shepherds of Good Hope in Ottawa, Ontario.

== Professional career ==
In his early years Raymond worked for the Porcupine & District Children’s Aid Society (1965–1971). However, in 1971 he accepted many executive positions with provincial and municipal organizations:

- Ontario Ministry of Health and Long-Term Care (1971–1976) - Director of Social Work - Northeastern Regional Mental Health Centre
- Timmins Association for the Mentally Retarded – Program Coordinator (1976–1977)
- Ontario Ministry of Health (1977–1989) – Director of Social Work Services – Kingston Psychiatric Hospital
- Ontario Ministry of Health (1989–1998) – Coordinator of Community Development – Kingston Psychiatric Hospital
- Ontario College of Certified Social Workers – Chairman (1990–1993).
- Ontario Ministry of Municipal Affairs and Housing – Advisor (1998)

== Awards ==
- Appointed the First Honorary Member of the Board of Directors of the Kingston Branch of the Canadian Mental Health Association (1984)
- Distinguished Service Award from the Ontario Division of the Canadian Mental Health Association (1985)
- In-Appreciation Award from the Kingston Branch of the Canadian Mental Health Association (1992)
- In-Appreciation Award from the Timmins Branch of the Ontario Association of Social Workers (1992)
- In-Appreciation Award from the Kingston Branch of Ontario Association of Social Workers (1993)

== Career as a Writer ==
Raymond has self-published thirty-seven collections of poetry on the homeless, volunteers working with the homeless and a wide range of other topics. His earlier collections "We Salute You - Vol. IV - Nous Vous Saluons" is a pictorial and poetic tribute to those individuals and groups who volunteer at the Shepherds of Good Hope. He has collaborated on the publication of two booklets: "The Call to Peggy’s Cove" and "The Innovator". He has co-authored a novel about street people titled, "Remember Who I Am". He has also written two other manuscripts "On a Mission with Queensway Tours" and "Where to Next".

== Published works ==
- 'The Closing of Northeastern Regional Mental Health Centre: A Plea for Leadership', O.A.P.S.W. Newsmagazine, December 1975, Volume 3, Number 4 (pp 58 – 59).
- 'Housing Needs - A Survey of Inpatients at the Kingston Psychiatric Hospital', The Social Worker, 1984, Volume 52, Number 4, (pp 163 – 166).
- 'Quality Review Monitors Front-Line Worker's Performance', O.A.P.S.W. Newsmagazine, February 1985, (pp 12 and 15).
- 'Here Are More Reasons Why The Social Work Profession Must Organize to Seek Regulating Legislation', O.A.P.S.W. Newsmagazine, January 1986, Volume 12, Number 6 (pp 5 – 6).
- 'Community Development: An Integral Part of Discharge Planning', Canadian Association of Social Work Administrators in Health Facilities Newsletter, September 1997.
- 'Developing a Wider Range of Housing Options for the Mentally Ill', O.A.P.S.W. Newsmagazine, October 1987, Volume 14, Number 3.
- 'Farmer Fred - Accepting, Instead of Contradicting', Geriatric Nursing, September/October 1991, co-authored with Ken Gies.
- 'Developing Community and Hospital Partnerships: Fledgling Relationships Built on Mutual Trust, Presence and Commitment', What Works! Innovation in Community Mental Health and Addiction Treatment Programs, Canadian Scholars' Press Inc., March 1993.
- 'Constructive Grief', a book review of 'Grieving Mental Illness' published in Leadership in Health Services (January/February/96) of the Canadian Health Care Association.
- Published a second novel, 'Riding the Tides of Life', Ottawa: Budd Publishing, 2010. ISBN 978-0-9865373-2-5
