= Ontario Automobile Policy 1 =

Ontario Automobile Policy

Parliament of Ontario
- Long title: (OAP 1) Owner’s Policy
- Citation: Visit Regulation
- Territorial extent: Ontario
- Enacted by: Parliament of Ontario
- Effective: December 31, 1990
- Administered by: Financial Services Commission of Ontario

Amends
- June 1, 2016

Related legislation
- Ontario Insurance Act

Summary
- Standardized auto insurance policy for all private vehicles registered in Ontario

Keywords
- Ontario car insurance policy
- Status: In force

The Ontario Automobile Policy (OAP 1, also called the Owner's Policy) is a regulation under the Ontario Insurance Act enacted by the Parliament of Ontario to cover financial damages to persons and property after a car crash. All private companies registered to sell auto insurance in Ontario, are required to use the OAP for their private car insurance policy. The OAP is the legal contract that connects an Ontario driver with every Ontario based insurance company.

Insurance coverage is divided up between several different portions of the policy. The circumstances of the accident determine which section is used. An often misunderstood one is the Direct Compensation Property Damage (DCPD). The OAP is a "No Fault" insurance rules for accidents within the province. DCPD is mandatory to purchase, and it says insured drivers claim through their own insurance companies for repairs, rental, and tow charges, even when they are not at fault for an accident. If the at fault driver in Ontario doesn't have DCPD, then a driver is covered by Uninsured Motorist Property Damage instead (UMPD). UMPD is also mandatory to buy.

Other sections of the policy are Specified Perils and Comprehensive, which insure events like hail, theft, and vandalism. Collision covers damages from at-fault accidents and hit and runs. All Perils combines Comprehensive and Collision but adds some coverage. Each is optional to buy, however lease and car loan companies usually require Collision and Comprehensive.

The Ontario Automobile Policy does have several extra insurance pages called Endorsements. These are optional to buy. The most common are rental insurance (Loss of Use) used for Collision and Comprehensive claims, and new parts/new vehicle replacement (43 Endorsement).

In Ontario accident fault is judged according to the Ontario Fault Determination Rules. Which means whether an auto claim is covered by DPCD, or Collision, or a mixture of both, depends on how the insurance adjuster evaluates a driver's fault rating after an accident.

== Needed For Insurance Coverage ==
Every insurance section of the OAP has requirements that need to be met before a claim can be made under that section.

Coverage	Required	Section
DCPD	Accident happened inside Ontario.	6.1
DCPD	The driver has to be at least partially not at fault.	6.4.1
DCPD	At least one other vehicle involved has insurance from a company licensed in Ontario, or if outside of Ontario agree to join the Ontario DCPD club.	6.1
Collision/Comprehensive/All Perils	The vehicle damage is not eligible under DCPD insurance coverage.	7.1.1
Uninsured Motorist	Neither the owner or driver of the responsible automobile have liability insurance.	5.1.2
Uninsured Motorist	The Uninsured Automobile cannot be owned/registered to the named insured or spouse.	5.1.2
Uninsured Motorist	Other Automobile in the accident is identified.	5.2.3
Uninsured Motorist	Other Automobile is legally liable.	5.2.3

== What is covered ==
Each section of the OAP coverage certain events like car crashes, vandalism, and hit and runs. Below is a summary.

Event	DCPD	Collision	Comprehensive	All Perils	Specified Perils	Uninsured Motorist
Car accident (at fault)	no	yes	no	yes	no	no
Car accident in Ontario (50% at fault).	partial (50%)	yes	no	yes	no	no
Car accident in Ontario (0% at fault).	yes (100%)	yes	no	yes	no	no
Car accident (not at fault) outside Ontario.	no	yes	no	yes	no	no
Car accident (not at fault) at fault driver has no insurance.	no	yes	no	yes	no	yes
Hit and Run (Identified driver)	yes	yes	no	yes	no	no
Hit and Run (Unknown driver)	no	yes	no	yes	no	no
Hitting the ground	no	yes	no	yes	no	no
Hitting an object on the ground	no	yes	no	yes	no	no
Turnover	no	yes	no	yes	no	no
Theft or attempted theft	no	no	yes	yes	yes	no
Theft by a cohabitant	no	no	excluded	yes	excluded	no
Theft by an employee	no	no	excluded	yes	excluded	no
Fire	no	no	yes	yes	yes	no
Lightning, windstorm, hail, or rising water; earthquake	no	no	yes	yes	yes	no
Explosion	no	no	yes	yes	yes	no
Riot or civil disturbance	no	no	yes	yes	yes	no
Falling or forced landing of aircraft or parts of aircraft	no	no	yes	yes	yes	no
Damage while in transport	no	no	yes	yes	yes	no
Falling or flying objects	no	no	yes	yes	no	no
Missiles (ex. kicked up rocks)	no	no	yes	yes	no	no
Vandalism	no	no	yes	yes	no	no
Anything else not a collision - and not specially excluded. (see list below)	no	no	yes	yes	no	no

== What is not covered ==
Each section of the OAP coverage does not cover certain events like car crashes, vandalism, and hit and runs. Below is a summary.

Event	DCPD	Collision	Comprehensive	All Perils	Specified Perils	Uninsured Motorist
Damage to tires.	no	if caused by a collision	if caused by an insured peril such as fire, theft, or vandalism	if caused by an insured peril such as fire, theft, or vandalism	if caused by an insured peril such as fire, or theft	no
Mechanical breakdown.	no	if caused by a collision	if caused by an insured peril such as fire, theft, or vandalism	if caused by an insured peril such as fire, theft, or vandalism	if caused by an insured peril such as fire, theft	no
Rusting, corrosion, wear and tear, freezing, or explosion within the engine.	no	if caused by a collision	if caused by an insured peril such as fire, theft, or vandalism	if caused by an insured peril such as fire, theft, or vandalism	if caused by an insured peril such as fire, or theft	no
Lying about a theft, or owning an automobile.	no	no	no	no	no	no
Illegal disposal of the automobile.	no	no	no	no	no	no
A lien holder or lessor reclaiming the vehicle.	no	no	no	no	no	no
Selling your car, even if it was trickery or fraud.	no	no	no	no	no	no
Radiation damage.	no	no	no	no	no	no

== Deductibles ==
Insurance claims often come with deductibles. Either it is a percentage of the deductible purchased (100% of a $1,000.00 collision deductible) or a standard dollar deductible. Below is a summary.

Event	DCPD	Collision	Comprehensive	All Perils	Specified Perils	Uninsured Motorist
Car accident (at fault)	no	100%	no	100%	no	no
Car accident in Ontario (50% at fault*).	50%*	50%	no	50%	no	no
Car accident in Ontario (0% at fault*).	100%*	100%	no	100%	no	no
Car accident (not at fault) outside Ontario.	no	100%	no	100%	no	no
Car accident (not at fault) at fault driver has no insurance.	no	100%	no	100%	no	$300
Hit and Run (Identified driver)	100%*	100%	no	100%	no	no
Hit and Run (Unknown driver)	no	100%	no	100%	no	no
Hitting the ground	no	100%	no	100%	no	no
Hitting an object on the ground	no	100%	no	100%	no	no
Turnover	no	100%	no	100%	no	no
Theft or attempted theft	no	no	100%	100%	100%	no
Theft by a cohabitant	no	no	excluded	100%	excluded	no
Theft by an employee	no	no	excluded	100%	excluded	no
Fire, lightning	no	no	$0.00	$0.00	$0.00	no
Windstorm, hail, or rising water; earthquake	no	no	100%	100%	100%	no
Explosion	no	no	100%	100%	100%	no
Riot or civil disturbance	no	no	100%	100%	100%	no
Falling or forced landing of aircraft or parts of aircraft	no	no	100%	100%	100%	no
Damage while in transport	no	no	100%	100%	100%	no
Falling or flying objects	no	no	100%	100%	no	no
Missiles (ex. kicked up rocks)	no	no	100%	100%	no	no
Vandalism	no	no	100%	100%	no	no
Anything else not a collision - and not specially excluded. (see list below)	no	no	100%	100%	no	no

* DCPD deductibles are rarely purchased, but if done, the DCPD deductible applies for not at fault accidents.

== Disputes ==
Insurance company adjusters are responsible for getting accident details and interpreting the OAP. Insurance adjusters determine what accidents will be covered under what section. However, policyholders may dispute an adjusters determination by a process of appeal. Each insurance company has a difference process. The insurance representative (adjuster, broker, or agent) is responsible for advising policyholders of the procedures.

Also, each insurance company has a complaint officer. Alternatively, the complaint can be sent to the chief executive officer directly. If a policyholder and insurance company do not come to an agreement, the insurance company is obligated to send a "final position letter" outlining their reasons as well as providing a policyholder with the name and details of an independent Ombudsman organization who reviews all complaints. Upon receipt of an unresolved complaint with applicable paperwork and final position letter, a Complaint Officer at the independent Ombudsman organization will review and respond to all complaints.
