= Public drinking in Ontario =

In the Canadian province of Ontario, severe restrictions on the sale and consumption of alcoholic drink were imposed in localities during the later 19th century. Prohibition was imposed across the province under the 1916 Ontario Temperance Act, until restrictions were somewhat eased with the passage of the Liquor Control Act of 1927 which set up the still existing Liquor Control Board of Ontario. Regulations were further amended in 1934.

== Temperance ==
The Temperance movement started long before Ontario enacted the Ontario Temperance Act of 1916, and for more reasons than social or wartime issues. Fighting for absolute temperance, Prohibition advocates lobbied for this in the 1850s at the Provincial level, and eventually got the right to vote for Prohibition at the municipal level, or otherwise known as "local option". In 1854 the Province of Canada had a positive vote in a local referendum, which consequently allowed city councils to deny all liquor licenses. In 1864, the Dunkin Act was passed by the Province of Canada to curb liquor consumption, offering more liquor control by local option. Later, under heavy demand from the national temperance convention in Montreal in 1875, the Supreme Court ruled in 1877 that Parliament could act on temperance issues through the Government's responsibility for trade and commerce under the constitution. In 1878, the federal government enacted the Canada Temperance Act, or Scott Act, which gave every part of the Dominion of Canada to use local option, which did not satisfy temperance activists lobbying for complete country-wide prohibition. Regardless, temperance activists did not go unchallenged; an attempt to shut down all taverns in Toronto in 1877 using local option led to hundreds of working class men challenging prohibitionist voters, and the attempt was ultimately defeated. Despite the tide of prohibitionist lobbying, Canadians by 1914 were, on average, drinking over seven gallons of beer and a gallon of spirits per year: a 65% increase in beer consumption and a 50% increase in spirits consumption since 1900.

== Prohibition ==
Using the War Measures Act, prohibition under the Ontario Temperance Act was introduced to Ontario in March 1916 by William Howard Hearst after 15,000 people brought 825,000 petition signatures to provincial legislature. This legislation was introduced to curb public drinking; saloons, clubs, and retail liquor shops were closed and alcohol was banned from hotels and other similar businesses. Although private consumption of alcohol remained legal, storing large quantities remained criminal. Not all alcoholic beverages were banned in Ontario. The Ontarian provincial government allowed wineries to continue selling for export, but no more than 2.5 per cent proof alcohol (1.5 per cent by volume). Hotels and similar businesses could continue selling this "near beer" or "temperance beer" instead of the prohibited liquor and spirits. In October 1919, wartime prohibition was made permanent and guaranteed prohibition until the Liquor Control Act of 1927.

The Board of License Commissioners (BLC) was created in 1915 to centralize liquor law authority and precedes the Liquor Control Board of Ontario (LCBO) during the decade of Prohibition prior to LCBO's creation. The BLC made sure to enforce the Ontario Temperance Act and manage the distribution of liquor for medical and industrial needs. To enforce the Ontario Temperance Act, the BLC was in charge of supervising the manufacture and sale of liquor and inspection and licensing of hotels. The BLC used this authority to create a new label for accommodation enterprise: the Standard Hotel. The Standard Hotel had to meet BLC guidelines on number of rooms, services provided and quality of structure. For accommodation enterprises that were granted the Standard Hotel license, it was permitted to have extra lucrative services such as selling tobacco or operating restaurants without further fees imposed by the BLC. Despite these regulations, hotels often had two-way taps to switch between light and regular strength beers depending on how well you were known in the community. Brewers would supply these extra-legal supplies to their clientele just to keep prospects for their business. By 1927, Labatt's production in London Ontario was focusing 90% of their production on full-strength alcoholic beverages, supplying reliable bootleggers.

== 1927 Liquor Control Act ==
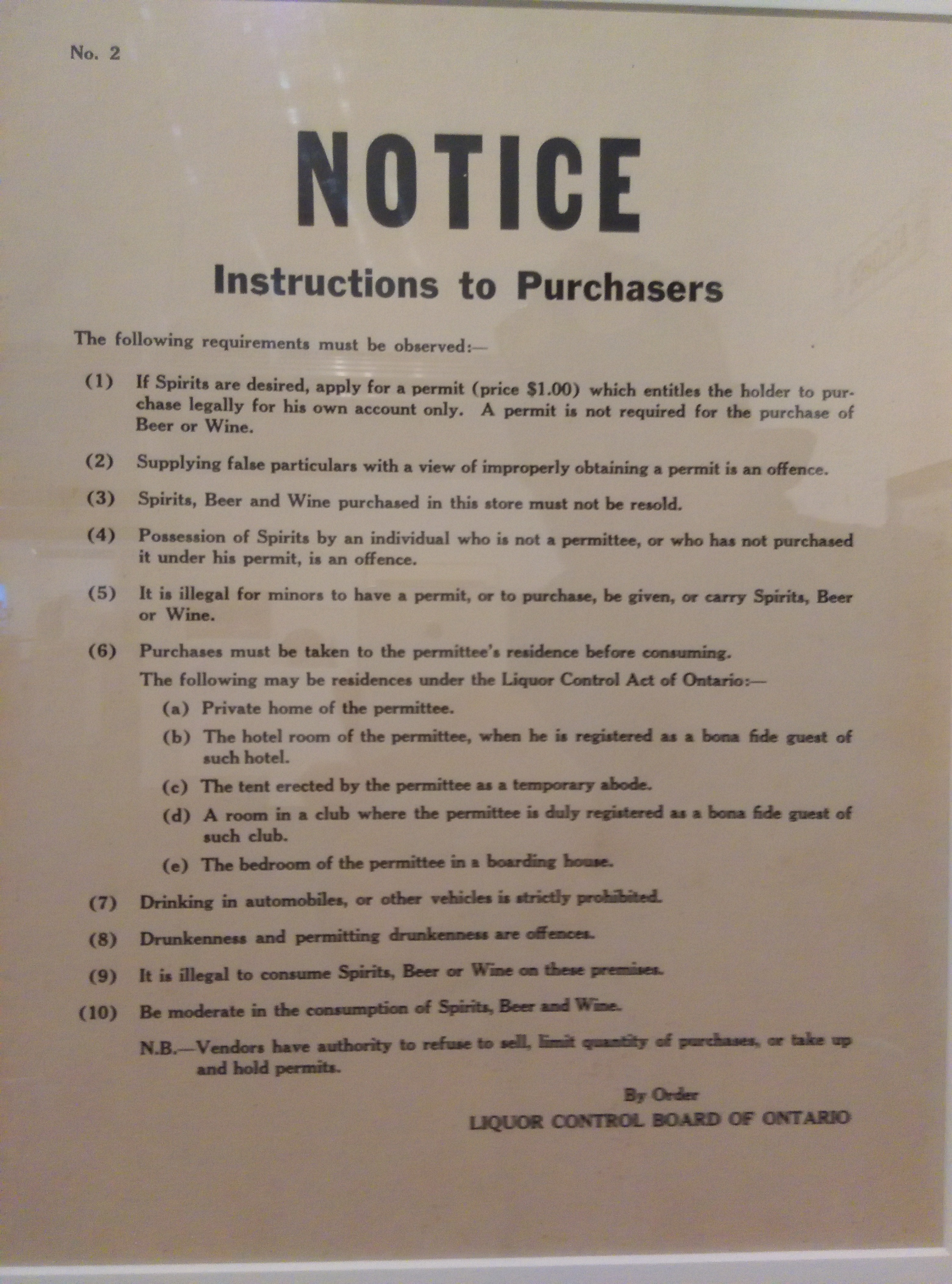
Liquor Control Board of Ontario (LCBO) notice outlining the rules for purchase and consumption of alcoholic beverages.

Ontario lobbied for liquor control instead of absolute temperance, enacting the Liquor Control Act of 1927, replacing the Ontario Temperance Act after 9 years of Prohibition. For many Canadian provinces, Prohibition was a reaction to wartime resource scarcity enacted by the Dominion government and a solution to perceived social and economic woes of "problem drinkers". Partly due to prohibition as a wartime reaction, several provinces rescinded prohibition as soon as possible. Quebec allowed sales of alcoholic beverages in 1919, and reintroduced public drinking in 1921, British Columbia and Yukon Territory by 1921, Manitoba in 1923, Alberta in 1924, and Saskatchewan in 1925 all managed to implement public drinking management faster than Ontario's Liquor Control Act of 1927. Although it was forbidden to drink regular-strength beer in public for another 7 years under the Liquor Control Act (LCA) of 1927, it remained legal to drink in a loosely defined "private dwelling place" as "any building or part of a building or tent where a person resides".

Bureaucratization of liquor control in the 1930s surrounding the Liquor Control Act (LCA) of 1927 and 1934 was surrounded by both political and moral issues. On one hand, being more strict with liquor control would appease the temperance movement in Ontario but could promote the rise of a liquor black market, and being more passive in liquor legislation could cause greater social chaos and give the temperance movement more evidence to empower themselves. Historians have differing views on the purpose of liquor control legislation, some argue it is for the need to control deviants, others argue that liquor control was an example of moral regulation through legislation to control a "problematic substance", or an attempt to facilitate temperance and balance the need for drinking.

Drinking places often had casinos in an upstairs room, but the fanciest drinking establishments were located along the U.S. border, specifically around Windsor. Both Americans and Canadians enjoyed these drinking places; dining, drinking, and gambling were the most common forms of entertainment in these spots. To protect themselves, patrons would be very wary of where they put their illegal drinks: keeping their beer close to hide, dump or smash in case of a raid. To protect bigger establishments, spies would be placed to warn patrons of incoming authorities and illegal beverages and gambling equipment would be stashed away behind false walls and hideaway cupboards.

== 1934 Liquor Control Act ==
Following the enactment of the LCA of 1934, the government confined public drinking to hotels based on a long-standing relationship between drinking places and living space. This relationship is a result of government legislation such as the "Act to Amend the Liquor License Laws" of 1906 which adds restrictions to the number of public drinking spaces permitted. This 1906 legislation defined the "tavern" as "an hotel, inn or other public house of entertainment kept for the purpose of providing refreshment and accommodation". In addition to this, an "Act to Amend the Liquor License Laws" of 1909 designated that no liquor license would be given to any tavern or similar enterprise without proper accommodation, thus a tavern without rooms for rent would not necessarily receive such a license. These sets of pre-Temperance legislation created a strong connection between hotel beverage rooms and drinking culture. In a bid to profit on the new rules created by the LCBO regarding alcoholic beverages, over one thousand proprietors of hotels sent in applications to the LCBO to obtain beer authority or beer and wine authority. Although beverage rooms were quite popular before the LCA (1934), the LCA (1934) was restrictive and the LCBO included a wide variety of regulations to govern many aspects of hotel operation; singing, dancing, and playing or listening to music was prohibited in hotel beverage rooms. The LCBO, through the enactment of the LCA, built cultural authority wherein a new attitude of public responsibility and respect was cultivated.
