= Ottawa Courthouse =

Courthouse in Ontario, Canada

Coordinates: 45.420511°N 75.691692°W

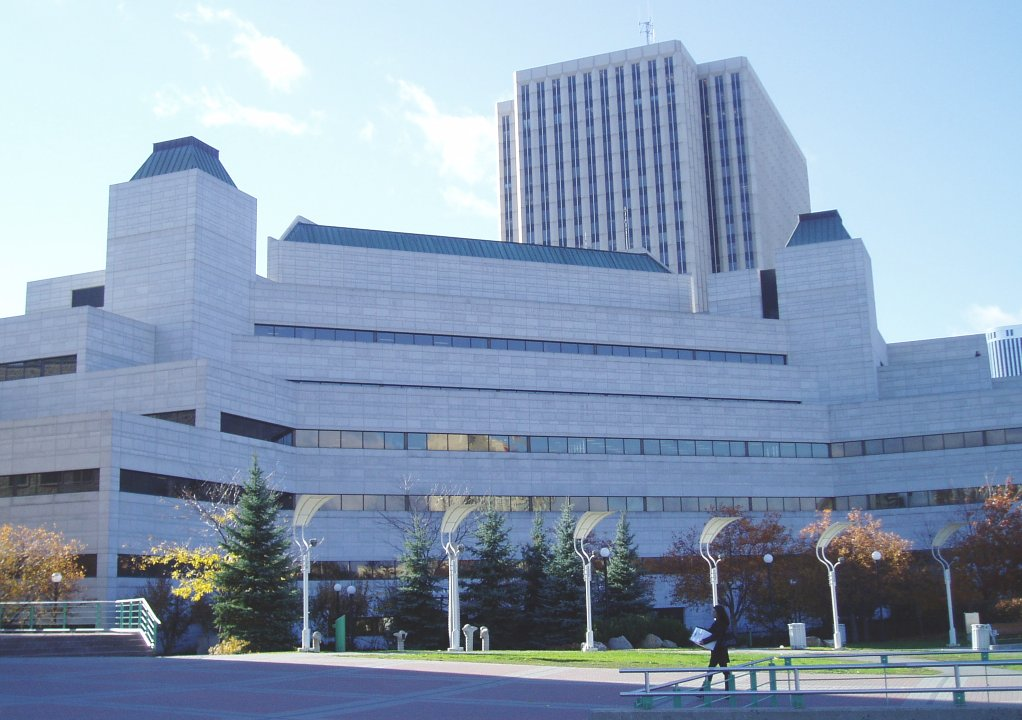
The Ottawa Courthouse with Place Bell in the background

The Ottawa Courthouse (French: Palais de justice d'Ottawa) is a courthouse in Ottawa, Ontario, Canada. It is the main provincial court for the Ottawa area, and as such handles most of the region's legal affairs. The building is home to the civil, small claims, family, criminal, and district branches of the Ontario Superior Court of Justice. It is also home to the local land registry office. Some 1,000 people use the nine story building each day.

== History ==
The courthouse on Elgin Street building opened in 1986. The courthouse is located at the corner of Elgin Street and Laurier Avenue. Previously the site had been home to Cartier Square, and for many decades was covered by temporary buildings erected during the Second World War. The courthouse is next door to the current Ottawa City Hall, formerly the Ottawa Regional Headquarters building, which was built only a few years later. Previously the courts had been spread throughout the city.

The first courthouse and jail, which was built on Daly Avenue in 1842 had burned beyond repair c. 1869.

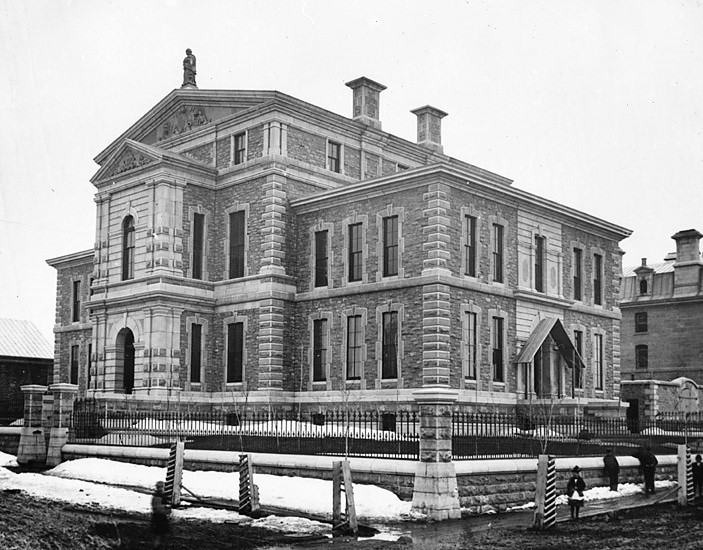
Carleton County Courthouse, 1870

The former Carleton County Courthouse designed by architect Robert Surtees, was built in the Italianate style on Daly Avenue in 1870. In 1988, this limestone building was transferred to the City of Ottawa; Arts Court now houses more than 25 arts and heritage organizations. The building's Italianate features include window surrounds, rusticated quoins and tall chimneystacks. The cornerstone includes gold, silver and copper coins and bank tokens of the period.

== Structure ==
At the base of the building is a parking garage and the temporary holding cells for prisoners. The central levels are composed of the court rooms and a large atrium. The top levels contain offices for judges.

The largest room in the courthouse was transported from the old location. It is an identical replication, that used the same materials, doors, seats, etc.
