= College of Physiotherapists of Ontario =

Canadian regulatory college

The College of Physiotherapists of Ontario is a regulatory college which regulates physiotherapists, also known as physical therapists (PTs), in the province to protect and serve the public interest. Regulatory Colleges exist to protect the public. This means the college protects every patient's right to safe, competent and ethical care by supporting physiotherapists in maintaining the standards of practice of the profession, and by holding them accountable for their conduct and practice. The college is located in Toronto.

== Organization ==
The work of the college is directed by a Council (similar to a board of directors) whose job it is to represent the interests of the public (i.e. the patients who seek physiotherapy services). The council is made up of physiotherapists (who have been elected by their peers), academic representatives (from universities in Ontario) and members of the public (who have been appointed by the government.) The Regulated Health Professions Act (RHPA) gives the college its mandate to regulate the practice of physiotherapists and provides health care consumers with a strong voice in the regulation of physiotherapists by requiring an equitable balance of public appointees and elected professionals on the College Council. One of the ways the college protects the public is by providing an online tool called the Public Register or Find a Physiotherapist tool that allows people to easily find information about any registered physiotherapist in Ontario.

== Roles ==
- Registration/Entry to Practice
- Practice Advice
- Quality Management
- Practice Assessments
- Professional Conduct
- Making A Complaint
- Mandatory Reports
- College Council
- Public Register
- Patient Relations Program
