= Ontario College of Certified Social Workers =

Established in 1982, the Ontario College of Certified Social Workers (OCCSW) provided an avenue for Social Workers in Ontario to voluntarily certify themselves in the profession.

The OCCSW was replaced by the Ontario College of Social Workers and Social Service Workers in 1998.

== Past Chairpersons ==
- Shannon McCorquodale - 1982 to 1986
- Leonard Levine - 1986 to 1988
- Joanne Turner - 1988 to 1990
- Raymond D. Tremblay - 1990 to 1993
- David Rivard - 1993 to 1996
