= King's Printer for Ontario =

Official publisher of the Government of Ontario

King's Printer for Ontario (French: Imprimeur du Roi pour l’Ontario, also known as Queen's Printer for Ontario (French: Imprimeur de la Reine pour l’Ontario) during the reign of a female monarch, is the agent responsible for publishing government documents, and copyrighted materials belonging to the Government of Ontario.

Documents printed by the King's Printer include:

- Holds copyright in Ontario statutes, regulations and judicial decisions including the Revised Statutes of Ontario
- Official Road Map of Ontario – issued 1923 by the then Department of Public Works and Highways and now by MTO
- Documents for the Education Quality and Accountability Office(EQAO) - http://www.eqao.com/
