= Pedlar People Limited =

Pedlar Limited
- Industry: Manufacturing
- Founded: 1861
- Founder: Henry Pedlar, George H. Pedlar
- Defunct: 1982
- Fate: Dissolved
- Headquarters: Oshawa, Canada
- Number of locations: Montreal, Winnipeg, Vancouver
- Products: sheet metal building materials: metal ceilings and walls, metal lath, garages

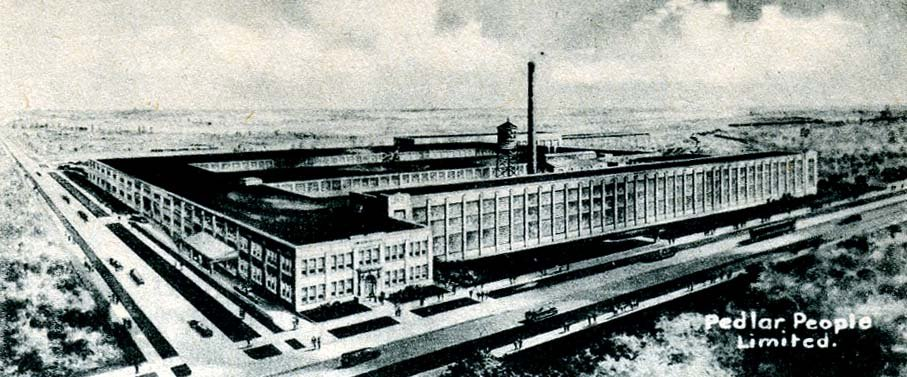
Early 1900s. Black and white photo of exterior of Pedlar People Ltd. Factory, Oshawa.

Pedlar People Limited was a sheet metal stamping operation started in 1861 in Oshawa, Ontario by blacksmith Henry Pedlar in the back of his hardware store. The operation was expanded by his son, George H. Pedlar, to become the largest sheet metal factory in the British Empire. The business was in operation until forced into receivership in 1982. Pedlar People, together with several other small manufacturing operations enabled Oshawa to be considered the "Manchester of Canada."

== Founding ==
Henry Pedlar started a small kitchen utensil manufacturing operation out of the back of his hardware store in 1861. The store was located at the corner of Bond and Simcoe Streets.

== Pedlar People growth ==
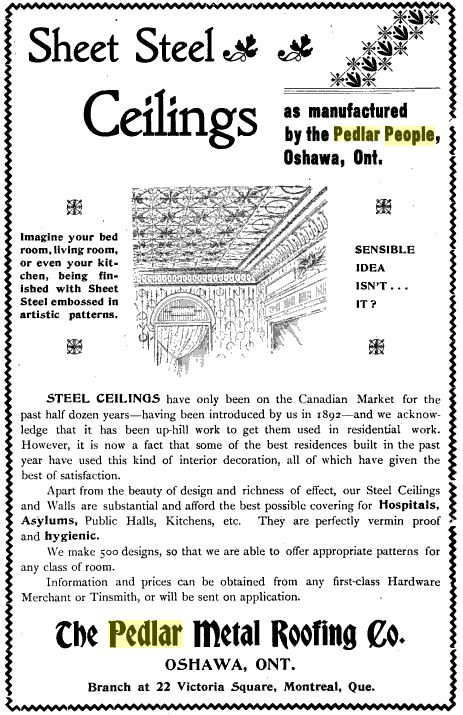
Advertisement from Pedlar People

After the death of the founder, Henry Pedlar, his son George assumed management of operations. As a result of a recession in 1890, George went to the United States in search of work. In the western states, he became acquainted with metal shingles and brought the technology back to Oshawa.

In 1892 with the backing of the Western Bank, Pedlar moved operations to an old stable on Simcoe Street at Metcalfe (current location of Memorial Park) and renamed operations to the Pedlar Metal Roofing Company to manufacture the metal shingles. Growth was constant over the next years, enabling the Pedlar operation to become the largest manufacturer of architectural sheet metal building material in the British Empire. The factory was located in Oshawa, Canada but warehouses were established in several other cities in Canada, such as Montreal, Winnipeg and Calgary. International warehouses were established in Sydney, Australia, Auckland, New Zealand and Cape Town, South Africa.

Decorative metal ceilings and walls became a mainstay of Pedlar's business in the early part of the 20th century. Significant buildings in Canada and the rest of the Empire were decorated with the metal ceilings made by Pedlar. Some of these clients included the Seminary chapel, Quebec City, Quebec, The School of Practical Science in Toronto, The Royal Victoria Hospital, Montreal, Quebec, and Henry Bull and Company Warehouse, Sydney, Australia. Pedlar advertised that the metal ceilings reduced the risk of fire to the point that insurance companies would lower rates for houses so-equipped. Further, the walls could be washed, scrubbed and sanitized enabling the surfaces to be cleaner than wood or plaster, common building materials of the time.

In the United States, Pedlar products were distributed by The Stark Rolling Mill Company in Canton, Ohio. In 1911, operations had been renamed The Pedlar People Limited as the company incorporated itself. Pedlar was the company that supplied the majority of metal ceilings for the F.W. Woolworth stores in Canada.

In 1913, George Pedlar unexpectedly died suddenly at the age of 69. Walter R. Geikie succeeded him as president until 1950. After 1950, operations were run by Walter's son, John.

By 1914, the operation had expanded to include products such as decorative metal ceilings, walls and centers, metal lath, galvanized steel shingles, corrugated sheets, culverts and metal buildings, including garages. The Pedlar People guaranteed their metal roofs from leaking within 25 years of ownership. By 1931, they had expanded to include factories in Montreal, Winnipeg and Vancouver. Utilizing creative marketing, Pedlar advertised to farmers in trade magazines offering them a "coupon" that they could detach and write down specifications for their barns. Pedlar understood that farmers would be unlikely to write full letters requesting information. The result of this initiative was a doubling of inquiries about their products.

In 1921, Pedlar relocated operations to a new, more spacious $550,000 factory on 7 acres (2.8 ha) located on Simcoe Street South at First Avenue in Oshawa. At the time, 350 people were employed at the factory.

== World War II ==
Due to Oshawa's significant manufacturing sector, the War Department contracted several factories, including Pedlar People, to manufacture munitions and materiel. Pedlar manufactured 40mm anti-aircraft cartridges, and 75mm field gun artillery shells, and 4.5 mm cartridge cases.

== Post war ==
By 1971, the company had updated its product line to include school lockers and architectural metal computer flooring that allowed cooling systems to be installed beneath to keep the computers cool. At the time, Pedlar was owned by John Geikie, son of Walter Geikie.

== Pedlar Industrial Inc. ==
In 1976, the operation was sold to a Toronto holding company under the management of 39 year old Graeme Kirkland who held 81% of the shares of the company which had sales in realm of $8M annually. Kirkland had previously been ousted from Jannock Corporation in October 1975 amid a collapsed merger between Jannock and Acklands, where he held the position of president and chief executive officer. Prior to that, Kirkland was a vice-president and director at Slater Walker of Canada.

Pedlar began buying up the inventories of ailing firms starting in 1977. In January 1977, they purchased the assets of TLM Conveying Systems of Brampton, Ontario and re-marketed those under the Pedlar name. In July 1977, Fergus Ontario's Beatty Farm Division, previously owned by GSW, was sold to Pedlar. This was part of Kirkland's plans to expand Pedlar's sales beyond Ontario; to the rest of Canada and into the United States. In 1978 they purchased another Oshawa manufacturing operation, Fittings Limited and Palmer-Shile from Michigan.

In 1979, an announcement was made that Badger Northland Incorporated of Kaukuana, a wholly owned subsidiary of Massey Ferguson, would be purchased by Pedlar Industrial. Kirkland stated that this acquisition represented "a logical extension of Pedlar Industrial activities in the agricultural equipment industry and reflects our continuing commitment to needs of the dairy and livestock farmers of North America." Badger was known for manufacturing solid farm liquid manure handling systems, manure spreaders and mower conditioners for hay. It was later reported that an agreement between the two parties, Massey Ferguson and Pedlar, could not be reached. Kirkland turned his interest to Quebec and purchased La Cie J.E. Jutras Inc. of Victoriaville and La Cie R.A. Lajoie Ltee of St. Pie de Bagot, both manufacturers of equipment for dairy and hog farmers. Kirkland's vision remained similar to what he stated when he tried to acquire the Massey Ferguson subsidiary; Pedlar would become the "largest manufacturer of livestock equipment in Canada and in the top half-dozen in North America".

== Receivership ==
In 1979, the name was officially changed to "Pedlar Industrial Incorporated" and a new Pedlar factory was erected in Oshawa, with a head office in Stevenson Industrial Park in Oshawa. The first signs of financial trouble appeared when in June 1980, Pedlar's credits applied to have the firm put into receivership. By September 1980, Pedlar found itself over-extended and owing creditors $8M, $4.5M of which was owed to the Bank of Montreal. In order to meet their debts, they sold off Quebec businesses that had only been acquired the previous year. A receivership manager was appointed and assets of the company began to be liquidated however, they were not predicted to be sufficient to cover company debts.

In 1982, the entire operation, was forced into receivership due to a global shortage of steel and high interest rates. Kirkland was quoted as saying, "We were suffering from two adverse elements which have also plagued Massey Ferguson and Chrysler"; he referenced a 60% drop in agricultural equipment and the complete loss in orders of automotive parts. The company filed dissolution papers with the Canadian Government, effective August, 1984.

Graeme Kirkland went on to work as financial advisor for Third Wave Investing in Toronto and became publisher of the Canadian Technology Investment Letter. He eventually founded Icynene, a water-based spray foam insulation invented by chemical engineer Gabe Farkas.

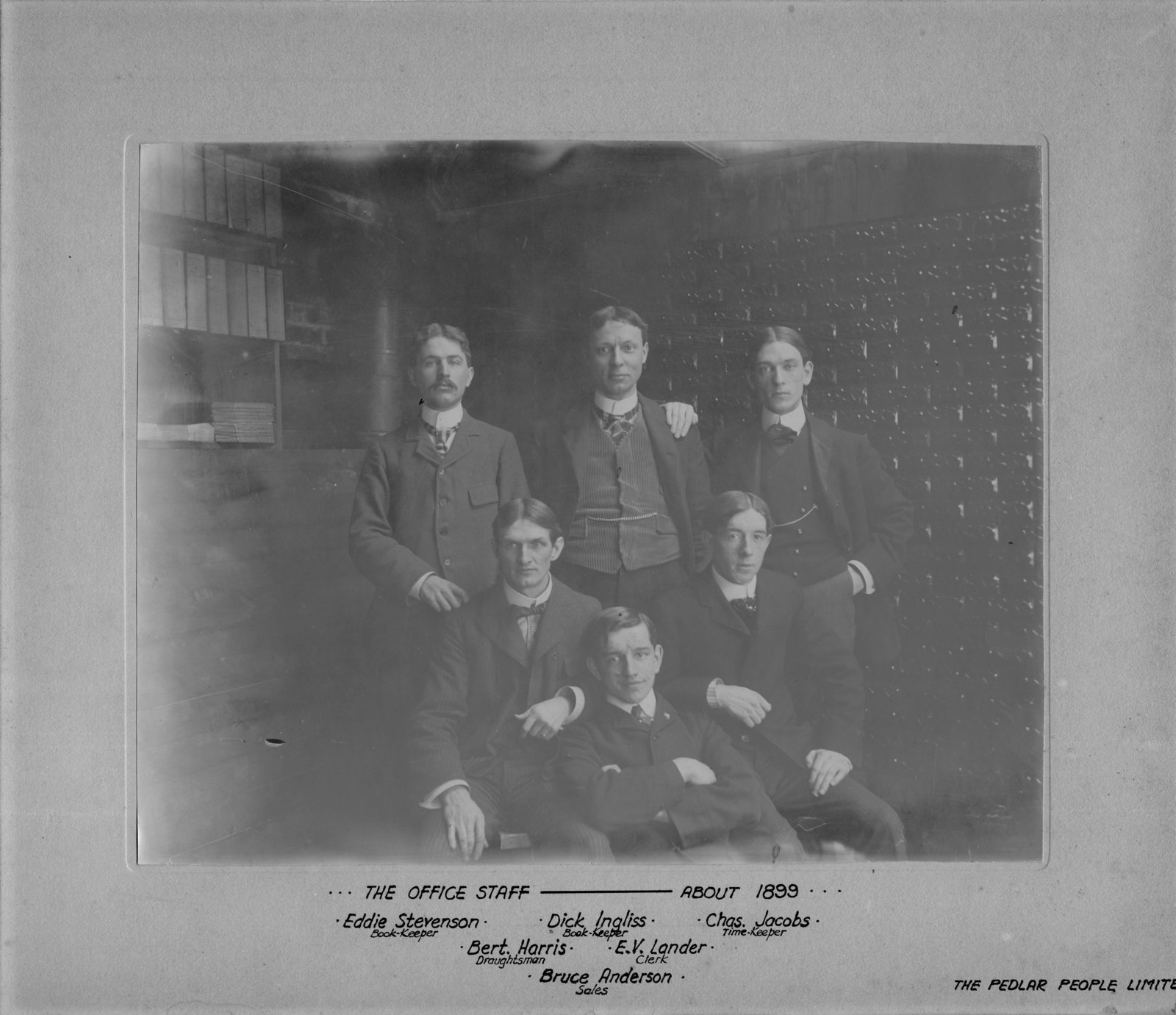
Pedlar People Ltd. Office Staff c. 1899

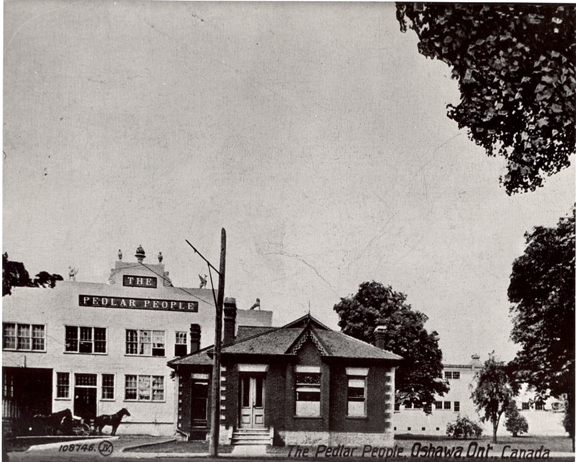
Pedlar People building c. 1910

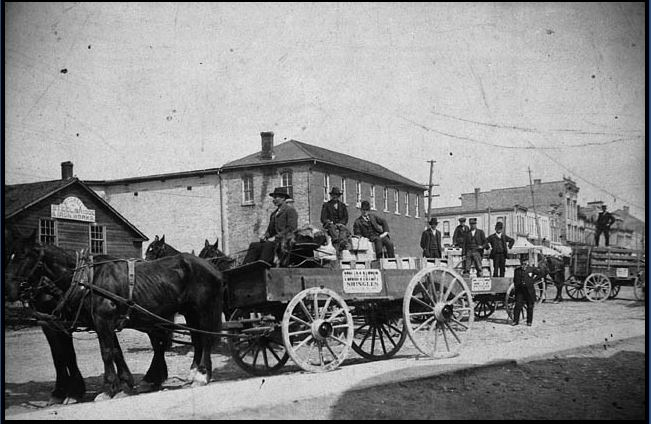
delivery of Pedlar metal shingles c. 1910

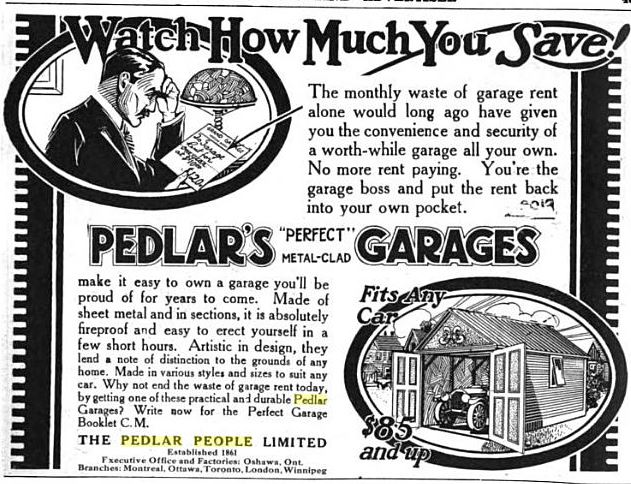
Advertisement in magazine for garage to store automobiles

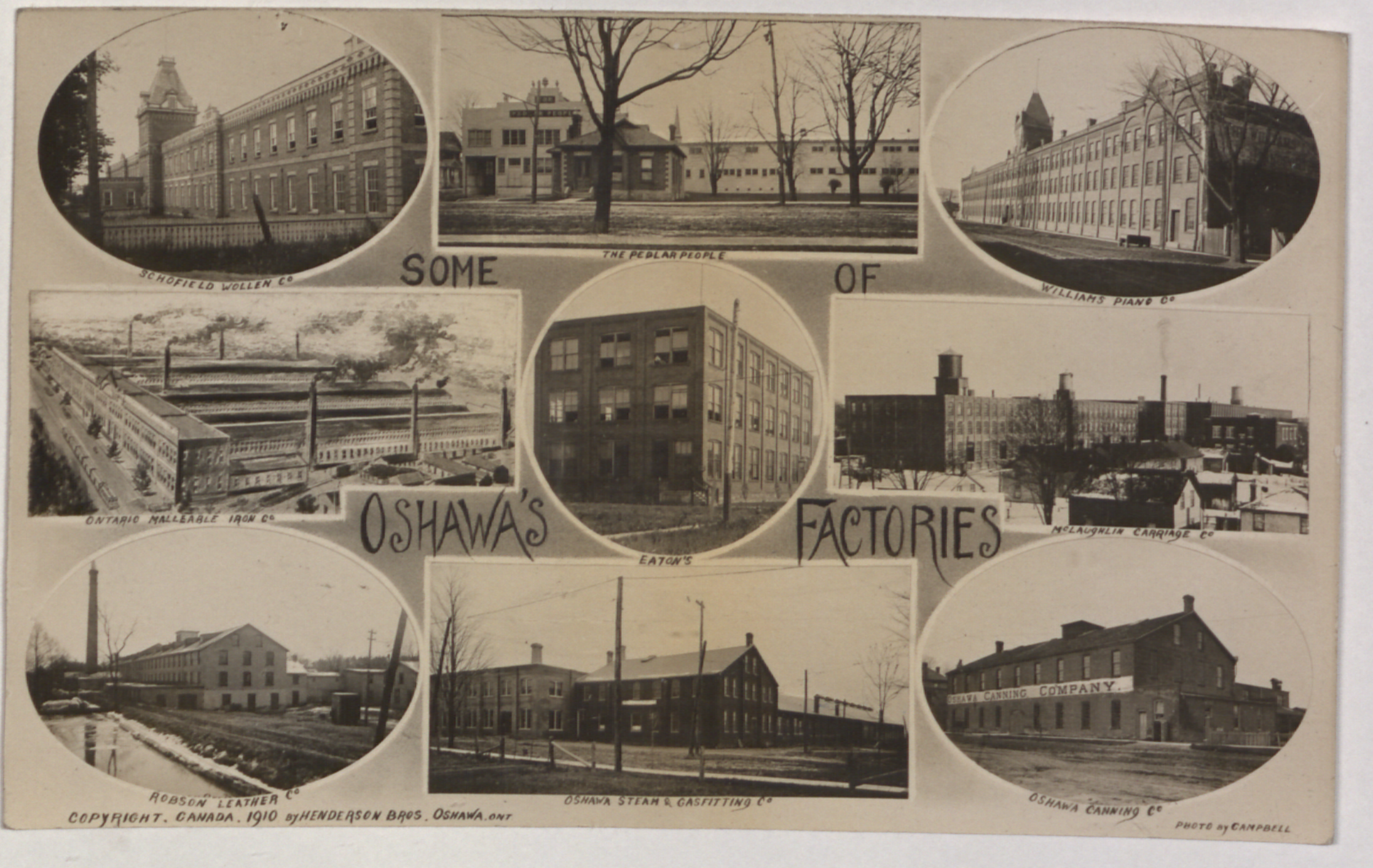
Pedlar People: top, center
