= Value-added wood products in Ontario =

Value-added wood products in Ontario are the result of combining commodity level products and innovation. Essentially, producing value-added wood products means taking raw materials and turning it into something useful. For example: engineered wood, millwork, cabinets, furniture, tongue depressors or popsicle sticks. Additional processing of a commodity wood product by manufacturers creates a specialty product whose value is more than the original product. These value-added products become part of the secondary sector of our economy.

== Forest Industry ==
The province's forest industry is supported mainly by the Northern Ontario boreal forest. These are the expansive and renewable resources that are drawn upon for the creation of value-added products. The geographical area covers 690,000 square kilometers which is roughly 17% of all Canadian forests as well as 2% of the world's forests. It is estimated that the Ontario landscape is covered by roughly 85 billion trees. The forest industry in Ontario brings in about $10.8 billion in revenue per year. Sixty percent of Ontario's forest industry is recognized as value-added wood products. In 2005, Ontario's manufacturing of cabinets and furniture represented $2.2 billion.

== Value Added Products ==
Value-added products are fabricated for the consumer. With the supply based on primary products, the production of value-added products generate jobs and revenue for many towns. There are numerous populated areas in Ontario supported primarily by value-added saw mills. Searchmont Ontario is a good example, once a bustling town supported by its lumber industry, now may be considered by some to be a ghost town. Since the lumber mill has closed down, Searchmont's main industries are tourism, as well as a ski hill.

== Sustainability ==
Since the Ontario forests are so plentiful the wood resource would be sustainable for some time. Most companies are doing their own part to help ensure that there is enough lumber within Ontario to support numerous generations to come. Tembec Industries has invested a large amount of time and money into planting trees. Tembec recently celebrated their 250 millionth tree planted in Ontario. The Ontario Government’s land use strategy helps protect and sustain all of Ontario's natural resources, including wood products. The Ontario Forest Accord provides security by forcing the forest industry and the environmental community to establish protected areas, while at the same time meeting the needs of the forestry industry.

In 2001, over 61,000 people were employed in Ontario as a direct result of the value-added wood sector. 94% of these workers reside in Southern Ontario.

There are over 2,000 manufacturers in Ontario producing value-added wood products. Furthermore, there are more than 1000 businesses associated with the value-added wood products. Out of all the Canadian provinces which produce value-added wood products, Ontario ranks first in terms of revenue. The majority of the Ontario's manufactured wood-related merchandise is exported to the United States. The northernmost states account for the greatest amount of revenue from Ontario wood exports.

Flakeboard Company Limited recently purchased a value added wood producing company located in Sault Ste. Marie. Formally G-P Flakeboard, a joint partnership of Georgia Pacific, the company has been operating since 1996 and owns the world's largest continuous medium density fibreboard press.

Tembec Industries has offices all over North America and France and exports goods all over the world. Tembec manufactures a large amount of pulp & paper and SPF lumber in Ontario. The goods include hardwood flooring, newsprint, and a variety of pulp. Tembec employs over 7,000 people worldwide. Tembec reaches approximately $2.4 billion in sales per year.

Trus Joint Kenora, a subsidiary of Weyerhaeuser, recently opened a TimberStrand mill in Kenora. The 400,000-square-foot (37,000 m^{2}) plant is the largest of its kind in the world. The $260 million plant manufactures state-of-the-art TimberStrand which is used for many different types of construction, including headers, flange stock, and long-length 2x4s and 2x6s. The plant employs only employs about 200 people. Analysis of employment trends from 1993 to 2002 show an annual growth rate of 5%. The exception being 2002 in which a decline of 3.6% was shown. Overall, an increase of 54% employment in the value-added wood processing is documented.

In the same time period, shipments of value-added wood products increased. In 1993 the revenue made by value-added wood-exports was close to $4.7 billion. In 2002 the market price reached $11.4 billion. This trend surpassed the employment rate by threefold. Comparison of this relation indicates that labour productivity improved due to an increase in capital investment.
