= Ontario Fault Determination Rules =

Canadian regulation about car accidents

Ontario Accident Fault Rules

Parliament of Ontario
- Long title: R.R.O. 1990, Reg. 668: FAULT DETERMINATION RULES
- Citation: Visit Regulation
- Territorial extent: Ontario
- Enacted by: Parliament of Ontario
- Effective: December 31, 1990
- Administered by: Financial Services Commission of Ontario

Amends
- October 17, 2018

Related legislation
- Ontario Insurance Act

Summary
- Regulate car accident fault in the province of Ontario

Keywords
- Car accident, accident fault
- Status: In force

The Ontario Fault Determination Rules (commonly known as the Fault Rules or FDR) is a regulation under the Ontario Insurance Act enacted by the Parliament of Ontario to judge driver responsibility after car accidents in Ontario. The Fault Rules say which driver was responsible for an accident. Accidents are either 0%, 25%, 50%, 75%, or 100% at fault. If the driver is from Ontario, the portion not at fault percentage is covered under Ontario's mandatory to buy Direct Compensation insurance, and the at fault portion is covered under the optional to buy Collision insurance.

A fault rating between 50–100% might affect the driver's and insurance policyholder's future risk factor and therefore future insurance rates. Note auto claim's using Specified Perils/Comprehensive for events like theft, vandalism, or hail damage are not subject to a fault rule (but may affect insurance rates and coverage depending on policyholder's claim history).

The Fault Rules are for most every accident in Ontario. However, under some rare conditions the Fault Rules do not apply and accident responsibility is determined by car accident case law. Car accidents outside of Ontario are governed by the Provincial or State where it happened. Each respective regulation is similar to these Fault Rules, but differences do exist, see the correct jurisdiction's fault rules for their details.

== Basic Rules ==
The Fault Rules have several basic conditions. These conditions specify that insurance companies have to use them when determining fault, and that circumstances like weather or road conditions do not matter when determining which driver was responsible.

The conditions are:

| Rule | Section |
|---|---|
| Insurance companies determine fault, through direct or indirection action of its insured persons, using the fault rules. | 2.1 |
| Fault is determined without caring about the circumstances, including the weather conditions, the road conditions, visibility, or actions of pedestrians. | 3.a |
| Location of the damage on a car, isn't evidence of what happened at the accident. | 3.b |

=== Evidence ===
Determining car accident fault requires knowing what happened at the accident. Re-creating an accident can be difficult. To deal with this most fault rules have a version for knowing the details of the accident, and not knowing (ex. accidents in the middle of an all-way stop).

The following are the ways accident details are collected.

- Driver accounts to either an insurance adjuster or police officer.
- Independent witnesses.
- On site police reports (if the police say for sure what happened).
- Dashboard camera video.

=== How much at fault ===
A car accident can have one or several Fault Rules that apply. If an accident has only one Fault Rule, then the one rule's rating puts each driver 0–100% at fault.

If there are several rules that apply then the rules below apply too.

| Rule | Section |
|---|---|
| If multiple rules apply to an insured person, then the one that gives the least fault is used. | 4.1 |
| However, despite 4.1, if each insured driver breaks a fault rule so each driver is both 0% at fault, and 100% at fault, then each driver is 50% at fault | 4.2 |

=== What if no Fault Rule applies ===
There are some rare accidents when no fault rule can apply.

If that happens then these rules apply:

| Rule | Section |
|---|---|
| If an incident is not described in any of the Fault Rules, then an insured driver is judged according to the ordinary rules of the road (case law). | 5.1 |
| If there isn't enough information to know what happened, then the insured driver is judged according to the case law. | 5.2 |

== The Fault Rules ==
The below sections are the actual Fault Rules. Each is divided into sections describing where the two (or more) cars are relative to each other.

== Rear End ==
| Rule | "A" | "B" | Section |
|---|---|---|---|
| Section 6.x applies when automobile "A" is struck from the rear by "B" and both vehicle's are in the same lane, going in the same direction. | n/a | n/a | 6.1 |

=== Rule 6.2 ===
| Rule | "A" | "B" | Section |
|---|---|---|---|
| If driver "A" is stopped or in forward motion, and is rear ended by driver "B". | 0% | 100% | 6.2 |

=== Rule 6.3 ===
| Rule | "A" | "B" | Section |
|---|---|---|---|
| If "A" is turning, either right or left, to enter a private road or driveway. | 0% | 100% | 6.3 |

=== Rule 6.4 ===
| Rule | "A" | "B" | Section |
|---|---|---|---|
| If "A" is going forward, and entering a road side parking place. | 0% | 100% | 6.4 |

== Entering a roadway ==
| Rule | "A" | "B" | Section |
|---|---|---|---|
| Section 7 applies when "B" is entering a road from a parking place, private road, or driveway. | n/a | n/a | 7.1 |

=== Rule 7.2 ===
| Rule | "A" | "B" | Section |
|---|---|---|---|
| If accident happens when "B" is leaving a parking place while "A" is passing it. | 0% | 100% | 7.2 |

=== Rule 7.3 ===
| Rule | "A" | "B" | Section |
|---|---|---|---|
| If accident happens when "B" entering the roadway from a private road or driveway "A" is passing it, and there are no traffic controls. | 0% | 100% | 7.3 |

== Entering from On Ramp ==
=== Rule 8 ===
| Rule | "A" | "B" | Section |
|---|---|---|---|
| If accident happens when "B" entering the roadway from an on-ramp. | 0% | 100% | 8.0 |

== Multi Car Rear End - Chain Reaction ==
| Rule | "A" | "B" | "C" | Section |
|---|---|---|---|---|
| Section 9.x applies when more than two cars are in a rear end accident. | 100 | n/a | n/a | 9.1 |
| Fault is only between cars that touch. | 0 | n/a | n/a | 9.2 |

=== Rule 9.3 a-b ===
| Rule | "A" | "B" | "C" | Section |
|---|---|---|---|---|
| If all vehicles are in motion, and "A" is lead, "B" is middle and "C" is last. | n/a | n/a | n/a | 9.3 |
| In collision between "A" and "B". | 0% | 50% | n/a | 9.3.a |
| In collision between "B" and "C". | n/a | 0% | 100% | 9.3.b |

=== Rule 9.4 a-b ===
| Rule | "A" | "B" | "C" | Section |
|---|---|---|---|---|
| If only "C" vehicle is in motion when collision happens | n/a | n/a | n/a | 9.4 |
| In collision between "A" and "B". | 0% | 0% | n/a | 9.4.a |
| In collision between "B" and "C". | n/a | 0% | 100% | 9.4.b |

== Sideswipes ==
| Rule | "A" | "B" | Section |
|---|---|---|---|
| This rule applies when "A" and "B" collide and are going the same direction, and in adjacent lanes. | n/a | n/a | 10.1 |

=== Rule 10.2 ===
| Rule | "A" | "B" | Section |
|---|---|---|---|
| If neither "A" or "B" change lanes, and both are on or over the centre line when sideswipe happens. | 50% | 50% | 10.2 |

=== Rule 10.3 ===
| Rule | "A" | "B" | Section |
|---|---|---|---|
| If the location of "A" or "B" cannot be confirmed when sideswipe happens. | 50% | 50% | 10.3 |

=== Rule 10.4 ===
| Rule | "A" | "B" | Section |
|---|---|---|---|
| If the collision happens when "B" is changing lanes. | 0% | 100% | 10.4 |

=== Rule 10.5 ===
| Rule | "A" | "B" | Section |
|---|---|---|---|
| If the collision happens when "A" is turning left at an intersection and "B" is overtaking "A" to pass it. | 25% | 75% | 10.5 |

=== Rule 10.6 ===
| Rule | "A" | "B" | Section |
|---|---|---|---|
| If the collision happens when "A" is turning left at a private road or driveway and "B" is overtaking "A" to pass it. | 50% | 50% | 10.6 |

=== Rule 10.7 ===
| Rule | "A" | "B" | Section |
|---|---|---|---|
| If the collision happens when "A" is turning left at a private road or driveway and "B" is passing several other cars stopped behind "A" to pass it. | 0% | 100% | 10.7 |

== Pile Ups ==
| Rule | "A" | "B" | "C" | Section |
|---|---|---|---|---|
| This rule applies when three or more vehicles are going in the same direction but adjacent lanes. | n/a | n/a | n/a | 11.1 |

=== Rule 11.2 ===
| Rule | "A" | "B" | "C" | Section |
|---|---|---|---|---|
| For each collision between two automobiles involved in a pile-up. | 50% | 50% | 50% | 11.2 |

IMAGE

== Sideswipe - Opposite Directions ==
| Rule | "A" | "B" | Section |
|---|---|---|---|
| This rule applies when "A" and "B" collide and they are going towards each other, and in adjacent lanes. | n/a | n/a | 12.1 |

=== Rule 12.2 ===
| Rule | "A" | "B" | Section |
|---|---|---|---|
| If neither "A" or "B" changes lanes and both are on or over the centre lane when sideswipe happens. | 50% | 50% | 12.2 |

=== Rule 12.3 ===
| Rule | "A" | "B" | Section |
|---|---|---|---|
| If the location of "A" and "B"cannot be determined when the sideswipe happens | 50% | 50% | 12.3 |

=== Rule 12.4 ===
| Rule | "A" | "B" | Section |
|---|---|---|---|
| If the automobile "B"is over the centre line when the collision happens. | 0% | 100% | 12.4 |

=== Rule 12.5 ===
| Rule | "A" | "B" | Section |
|---|---|---|---|
| If the automobile "B"turns left into the path of "A" | 0% | 100% | 12.5 |

::

=== Rule 12.6 ===
| Rule | "A" | "B" | Section |
|---|---|---|---|
| If the automobile "B"is leaving a parking place or is entering the road from a private road or driveway, and "A" is overtaking to pass another vehicle when the collision happens. | 0% | 100% | 12.6 |

== Intersection with no traffic controls ==
| Rule | "A" | "B" | Section |
|---|---|---|---|
| Rules 13.x apply to accidents that happen at an intersection with no traffic controls (ex. no stop signs, yield signs, or traffic lights). | n/a | n/a | 13.1 |

=== Rule 13.2 ===
| Rule | "A" | "B" | Section |
|---|---|---|---|
| If the automobile "A" enters the intersection first. | 0% | 100% | 13.2 |

=== Rule 13.3 ===
| Rule | "A" | "B" | Section |
|---|---|---|---|
| If automobile "A" and "B" enter at the same time, and "A" is to the right. | 0% | 100% | 13.3 |

=== Rule 13.4 ===
| Rule | "A" | "B" | Section |
|---|---|---|---|
| If it can't be established who entered the intersection first. | 50% | 50% | 13.4 |

== Intersection with traffic signs ==
| Rule | "A" | "B" | Section |
|---|---|---|---|
| Rules 14.x apply to accidents that happen at an intersection with traffic signs (ex. stop or yield signs). | n/a | n/a | 14.1 |

=== Rule 14.2 ===
| Rule | "A" | "B" | Section |
|---|---|---|---|
| If collision happens because automobile "B" doesn't obey the stop sign. | 0% | 100% | 14.2 |

=== Rule 14.3 ===
| Rule | "A" | "B" | Section |
|---|---|---|---|
| If "A" and "B" both fail to obey the stop sign. | 50% | 50% | 14.3 |

=== Rule 14.4 ===
| Rule | "A" | "B" | Section |
|---|---|---|---|
| If it cannot be established who didn't stop at the stop sign. | 50% | 50% | 14.4 |

=== Rule 14.5 ===
| Rule | "A" | "B" | Section |
|---|---|---|---|
| If at an all-way stop sign "A" arrives first and stops. | 0% | 100% | 14.5 |

=== Rule 14.6 ===
| Rule | "A" | "B" | Section |
|---|---|---|---|
| If at an all-way stop sign "A" and "B" arrive at the same time and stop, but "A" is to the right. | 0% | 100% | 14.6 |

=== Rule 14.7 ===
| Rule | "A" | "B" | Section |
|---|---|---|---|
| If it cannot be established who arrived at the stop sign first. | 50% | 50% | 14.7 |

== Intersection with traffic signals ==
| Rule | "A" | "B" | Section |
|---|---|---|---|
| Rules 15.x apply to accidents that happen at an intersection with traffic signals. | n/a | n/a | 15.1 |

=== Rule 15.2 ===
| Rule | "A" | "B" | Section |
|---|---|---|---|
| If the automobile "B" fails to obey a traffic signal. | 0% | 100% | 15.2 |

=== Rule 15.3 ===
| Rule | "A" | "B" | Section |
|---|---|---|---|
| If it can't be established who disobey the traffic signal. | 50% | 50% | 15.3 |

=== Rule 15.4 ===
| Rule | "A" | "B" | Section |
|---|---|---|---|
| If the traffic signs don't work, then the intersection is treated like an all-way stop. | n/a | n/a | 15.4 |

There is no graphic for this rule.

== Parking lots ==
| Rule | "A" | "B" | Section |
|---|---|---|---|
| Rules 16.x apply to accidents in a parking lot. | n/a | n/a | 16.1 |

== Who Has Right of Way in Parking Lots ==
| Rule | "A" | "B" | Section |
|---|---|---|---|
| Thoroughfare means a road for passing into, through, or out of a parking lot. Drivers on a thoroughfare have 1st priority. | n/a | n/a | 16.5 |
| Feeder lane means a road in a parking lot that isn't a thoroughfare. | n/a | n/a | 16.5 |

=== Rule 16.3 ===
| Rule | "A" | "B" | Section |
|---|---|---|---|
| If automobile "B" is leaving a feeder lane, and doesn't yield to automobile "A" who is on a thoroughfare. | 0% | 100% | 16.3 |

=== Rule 16.4 ===
| Rule | "B" | "A" | Section |
|---|---|---|---|
| If automobile "B" is leaving a parking space, and doesn't yield to automobile "A" who is on a feeder lane or thoroughfare. | 100% | 0% | 16.4 |

::

== Parked Cars ==
=== Rule 17.1 ===
| Rule | "A" | "B" | Section |
|---|---|---|---|
| If automobile "B" is parked when hit by automobile "A". | 100% | 0% | 17.1 |

=== Rule 17.2 ===
| Rule | "A" | "B" | Section |
|---|---|---|---|
| If automobile "A" is illegally parked, or stopped when hit by "B" and the accident happens outside a city, town, or village. | 100% | 0% | 17.2 |

There is no graphic for this rule.

== Failing to Obey Sign or Officer ==
=== Rule 18 a-d ===
| Rule | "A" | "B" | Section |
|---|---|---|---|
| If the accident happens because driver "A" fails to obey: a. Police officer's direction.; b. Do not enter sign.; c. Do not pass sign.; d. Do not turn sign. | 100% | 0% | 18 a-d |

There are no graphics for these rules.

== Backing Up ==
=== Rule 19 a ===
| Rule | "A" | "B" | Section |
|---|---|---|---|
| If driver "A" was reversing or backing up. | 100% | 0% | 19.a |

== U-Turns ==
=== Rule 19 b ===
| Rule | "A" | "B" | Section |
|---|---|---|---|
| If driver "A" was making a U-turn. | 100% | 0% | 19.b |

== Open door ==
=== Rule 19 c ===
| Rule | "A" | "B" | Section |
|---|---|---|---|
| If driver "A", or a passenger in "A", opens or leaves a door open. | 100% | 0% | 19.c |

== Driving Offences ==
| Rule | Section |
|---|---|
| For the purpose of the Fault Rules, a driver is considered to be charged with a driver offence. | 20.1 |
| If, as a result of the incident, the driver is charged with operating the automobile while his or her ability to operate the automobile was impaired by alcohol or a drug. | 20.1 a |
| If, as a result of the incident, the driver is charged with driving while his or her blood alcohol level exceeded the limits permitted by law. | 20.1 b |
| If, as a result of the incident, the driver is charged with an indictable offence related to the operation of the automobile | 20.1 c |
| If the driver, as a result of the incident, is asked to provide a breath sample and he or she is charged with failing or refusing to provide the sample. | 20.1 d |
| If the driver, as a result of the incident, is asked to perform physical coordination tests or submit to an evaluation and he or she is charged with failing or refusing to comply with the demand | 20.1 e |
| if, as a result of the incident, the driver is charged with exceeding the speed limit by 16 or more kilometres per hour. | 20.1 f |

=== How Driving Offences Change Fault ===
| Rule | Section |
|---|---|
| The degree of fault of the insured shall be determined in accordance with the ordinary rules of law, and not in accordance with these rules | 20.2 |
| If the driver of automobile “A” involved in the incident is charged with a driving offence; and | 20.2 a |
| If the driver of automobile “B” is wholly or partly at fault, as otherwise determined under these rules, for the incident. | 20.2 b |
