= Pure Spring Company =

Canadian soft drink company

The Pure Spring Company Ltd. was an Ottawa, Ontario-based bottler of soft drinks. Pure Spring products included Pure Spring Ginger Ale, Minted Grape, Swiss Cream Soda, Honee Orange, Grand Slam, root beer, and Gini, a mix. Its products were distributed from Alberta to the Maritimes, making Pure Spring the largest independent soft drink firm in Canada. Pure Spring was also a local bottler for RC Cola.

Pure Spring Ginger Ale had the highest per capita sales of any ginger ale in North America, according to Ottawa historian Shirley Woods Jr.

At its peak, Pure Spring had annual sales in the $50-million range. It had about 50 trucks, at least one of them driven by Paddy Mitchell, a legendary bank robber. According to Peter Mirsky, at one point in the 1960s and 1970s, Pure Spring was selling a larger volume of soft drinks in Eastern Ontario than Coca-Cola.

It was founded by David Mirsky, who was a son of Jacob Mirsky, Ottawa's first rabbi. Jacob, a Talmudic scholar and cantor, arrived from New York City in 1894.

As a teenager, David (1890–1962) was a newsie, selling papers, magazines and snack items on the Canadian Pacific Railway's Gatineau line. David began to collect bottles and return them to Bradings Brewery, where he struck a business deal. By 1920, he was selling bottled water, drawing it from a spring at the base of Nanny Goat Hill, then added soft drinks. Pure Spring was incorporated in 1925.

David's son, Mervin (1914-June 2010), took over the company after serving in the Canadian Forces in Europe during World War II and after a brief legal career with his twin brother, Jack.

The Mirsky family sold Pure Spring to Crush in the mid-1960s, though Mervin continued to run it until about 1987.

Pure Spring is credited with introducing canned soft drinks and the twist-cap to Canada.

Pure Spring opened a plant on Aberdeen Street, off Preston Street, in the heart of Ottawa's Italian community. A sure sign of success, the company moved into a new, larger facility on Belfast Road in 1968 with two bottling lines, a 40-spout filler for pint and NR (non-returnable bar mixers) glass, and a 60-spout filler for 30oz glass and the new format 750ml glass bottles.

The company was sold by Crush in the mid-80s to Eastcan Beverages Limited, and a new 100-spout can filler was added, which being a prototype was plagued by technical issues which nearly bankrupted the local investors of Eastcan. PepsiCo Canada stepped in and bought the facility, expanding it in 1987 and 1989. Production at the Belfast location ended in 1997 after PepsiCo consolidated its south-eastern holdings into the Mississauga facility, which now provides all of the Ottawa area product out of the Belfast warehouse.
