= Ottawa Safety Council =

- Abbreviation: OSC
- Formation: 1957
- Type: Safety Organization based in Canada
- Legal status: active
- Purpose: advocate and public voice, educator and network
- Headquarters: Ottawa, Ontario, Canada
- Region served: Canada
- Official language: English, French
- Website: www.ottawasafetycouncil.ca

The Ottawa Safety Council (OSC) is a non-profit charity based in Ottawa, Canada established in 1957 that promotes safety and protection of individuals. The OSC has a children's safety program, promotes adult crossing guards, and runs a motorcycle rider course.
