= Ontario Health Coalition =

Health organization based in Canada

The Ontario Health Coalition (OHC) is an organization in Ontario, Canada that advocates publicly funded health care. It authors and releases research reports related to health care provision issues and opposing privatization of health care. The organization is made up of an advocacy network of over 400 grassroots community organizations representing virtually all areas of the province that lobbies for its goals through rallies and lobbying.

The Ontario Health Coalition supports preserving Canada's Medicare system and the overall goal and policy of universal public health care.

In January 2018, the OHC released a report that due to underfunding, hospitals are operating above their capacity resulting in higher infection rates and waiting times.

In 2017, the OHC conducted a series of 14 public hearings across the province in order to gather personal testimony regarding hospital care. Earlier in the year, the organization conducted a cross-province tour against for-profit medical clinics conducting MRIs and other diagnostic tests as well as cataract and other minor surgical procedures, claiming that this is a form of privatization that undermines the public health care system.

The OHC has more than 400 member organizations as well as a network of local health coalitions and individual members.

The Ontario Health Coalition is affiliated to the Canadian Health Coalition and provides provincial coordination of community-based health coalitions.
