= Ontario Malleable Iron Company =

Iron foundry in Ontario, Canada

- Industry: Manufacturing
- Founded: 1872
- Founder: John Cowan and William Cowan
- Defunct: 1977
- Fate: Dissolved
- Headquarters: Oshawa, Canada

Ontario Malleable Iron Company (OMIC) was an iron foundry established in Oshawa, Ontario, by brothers John Cowan and William Cowan. The factory was in operation from 1872 until closure in 1977. Ontario Malleable, along with many other industrial firms in Oshawa, enabled comparisons between Oshawa and Manchester, England, such that Oshawa was, in the 1920s, referred to as the "Manchester of Canada".

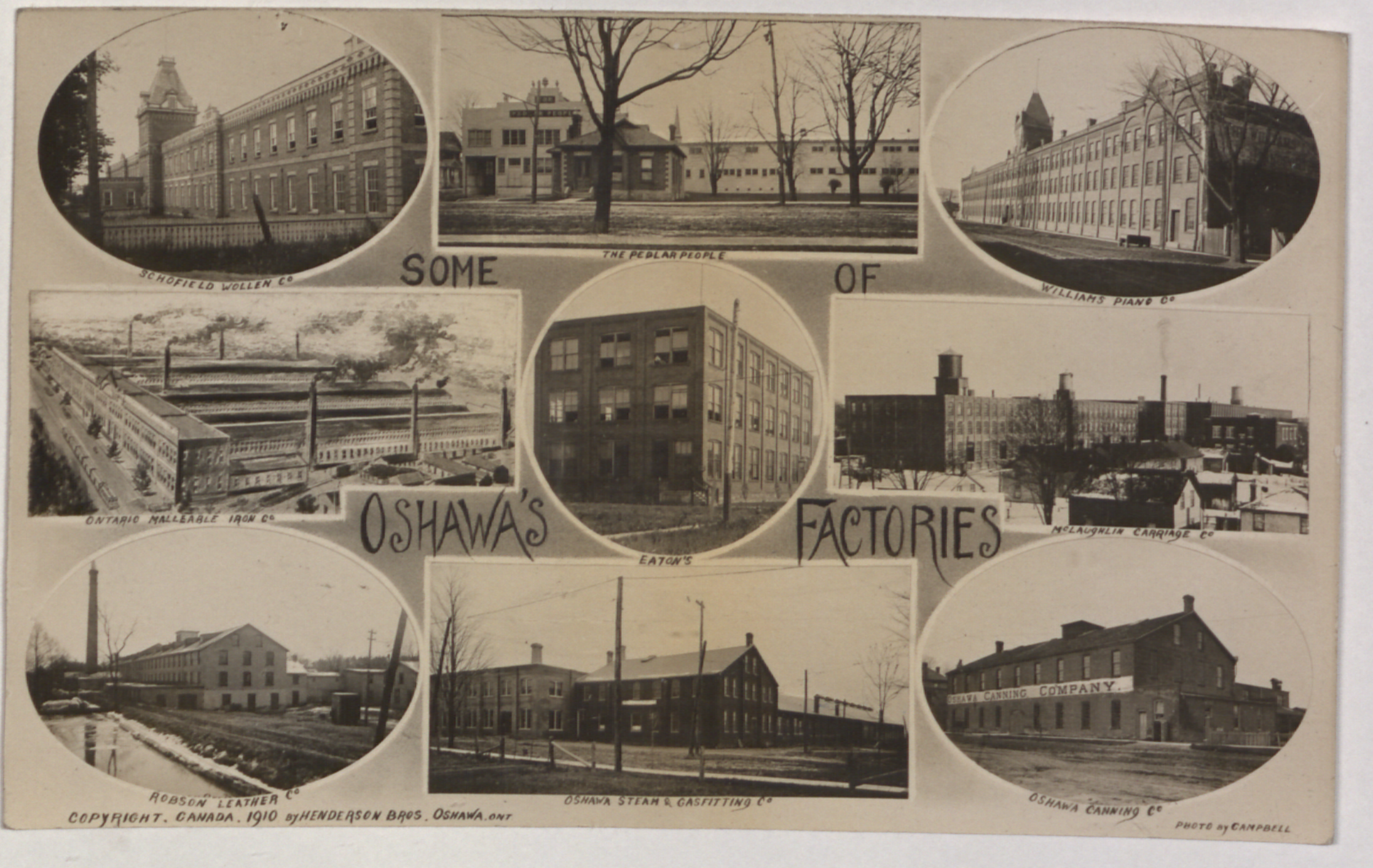
Ontario Malleable: middle, left

== Early history ==
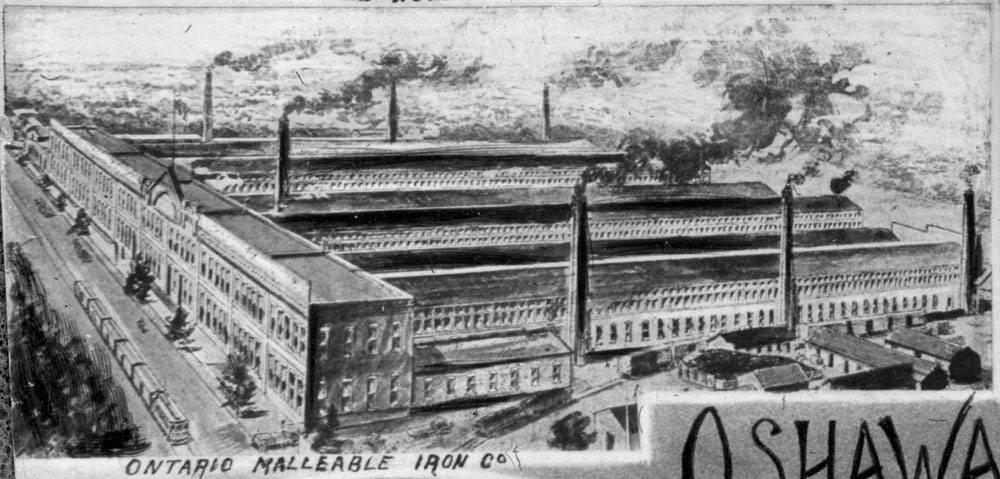
Ontario Malleable Iron Company, c. 1910

John Cowan and William Cowan, the founders of Ontario Malleable, emigrated from County Tyrone, Ireland in 1841 with their mother and settled in Toronto. There they met their father, Thomas S. Cowan, who had previously emigrated. Shortly thereafter, the father died, leaving the children to be raised by their widowed mother. William F. Cowan moved to Oshawa in 1862 and opened a dry goods firm; later purchasing an interest in Cedar Dale works, a manufacturer of farm implements.

In 1872, the brothers then chose to join forces, divest themselves of Cedar Dale Works and establish the Ontario Malleable Iron Company on Front Street in Oshawa enticed by a bonus offered by the township. The bonus was offered with the expectation that a number of men would be employed which quickly came to pass. Skilled workers, familiar with casting malleable iron, were solicited from New York State to staff the new foundry. Originally, the firm employed approximately 50 men in daily operations and was started to supply the agricultural implement industry with malleable castings manufactured in Canada instead of being imported from the United States. Within a few short years, Ontario Malleable had reached considerable fortitude, earning it the reputation as having the largest molding shop in the Dominion of Canada. The company had expanded business to include small and large castings; the large including castings for both the agricultural and automotive industries. Company payroll included as many as 800 men in many different capacities.

In December 1894, the entire foundry was destroyed in a fire that destroyed over $120,000 in assets but it was only insured for $27,000. The news of this fire was found in newspapers both in Canada and the United States. The New York Times, on 12 December 1894, in its article on the fire, reported that Ontario Malleable was the "oldest and most important industry of its kind in Canada." The fire reportedly started in a "dwelling" room and was fanned by strong winds. As local fire service arrived, they realized that the water tank on the fire engine had been depleted and the firemen had to take the engine to Robson's Tannery which was a half mile away. The firemen could not recover from the delay and the building was lost to the fire.

In 1895, electric rail lines were laid that allowed freight cars to roll directly into the factory for loading and connected back to the main Grand Trunk Railway line. Several key Oshawa factories were so accommodated, including McLaughlin Carriage, Ontario Malleable and Pedlar Roofing. Prior shipments had to be processed by wagon. By 1898, the factory had been rebuilt and was once again operational. Ontario Malleable was once again successful, so successful that by 1910, the plant employed more men than the McLaughlin Carriage and Automobile Works which became General Motors Canada.

The plant, along with many in the Oshawa area, was critical to war supply operations in both World Wars. In the First World War, Ford was supplied with castings. In the Second World War, half of Ontario Malleable's production was occupied with the manufacture of bogie wheels for Bren gun carriers.

=== Other business ventures ===
John Cowan became the president of the local Western Bank of Canada in Oshawa which operated in Oshawa from 1874 to 1908, when it merged with the Standard Bank of Canada. One of his more significant bank transactions was to loan Robert McLaughlin, owner of McLaughlin Carriage Company, the $3,000 he required to move his carriage business from Enniskillen to Oshawa. This was not a chance meeting between two of the most influential men of the region; rather, John's foundry had provided components for the carriage works for some time.

Throughout his career, John was a member of the board of many other Oshawa institutions such as the Oshawa Hospital, the Children's Shelter, the Board of Education and the Oshawa Public Library. In 1887, John became the mayor of the town of Oshawa.

=== New owners ===
Buried in the Canadian financial pages of 1925, was the news that Neil Sinclair had forced a cash takeover of Ontario Malleable. At this time, the net worth of the company was in the neighbourhood of one million dollars. News outlets such as the Toronto Telegram noted that the company was among the largest and best equipped malleable iron foundries in Canada. Earlier that same year, Sinclair had purchased McKinnon Industries, of St. Catharines, also for cash. However, the single point management of both companies, that was promised in the press, was quickly unwound and by late 1928, the firm was sold to Grinnell Company of Canada.

== Labour disputes ==
Labour disputes at Ontario Malleable were commonplace prior to, and after unionization in 1937. The first recorded strike in Oshawa was at OMIC in 1883.

=== 1900 ===
In December 1900, the core-makers at the factory went on strike, as a unit, because a core-maker was ordered by a foreman to dump molds. This required considerably more exertion next to the very hot molten metal which caused the core-makers to sweat. Returning to their relatively cold pattern room, the core-makers were concerned about getting chills from the temperature variance. The Labour Minister, William Mulock, was summoned by the then Mayor of Oshawa, Frederick Fowke. If the core-makers remained on strike, the lack of core production would eventually render the plant idle due to the lack of molds. This concerned the mayor as the winter season approached and threatened all of the employees with a lack of employment. The Deputy Minister of Labour, King, was dispatched to Oshawa immediately and by 12 December had settled the strike to the satisfaction of both the workers and the company. Among other concessions, the core-makers agreed to assist with pouring only in rare circumstances and a storm door was added to the pattern room to better regulate temperature.

=== 1936-1937 ===
In June 1936, the Steel Workers Organizing Committee (SWOC) was formed as part of the Committee of Industrial Organizations, including the Amalgamated Association of Iron, Steel and Tin Workers, (AAISTW) with the mandate to organize the labour of the steel industry. This American organization eventually made its way to Canada with its first contract being Sydney Steel in the Maritimes and Ontario Malleable. On 6 May 1937, the SWOC announced to the media that it had successfully signed a contract with the company securing workers wage increases of 20 to 30 cents percent.

This was a significant signing, which had been foreshadowed in a media war between John L. Lewis, the head of the CIO, and the Ontario Premier, Mitchell Hepburn, in the spring of 1937. Immediately following a contentious 16-day strike of the 3,700 employees at the Oshawa General Motors plant, ending on 23 April 1937, the CIO threatened to unionize 300 parts supply plants and component operations supplying General Motors. Lewis and Hepburn had previously faced off during the General Motors strike with the Premier stating that he would not deal with the CIO; the contract was signed by United Auto Workers. At the onset of the threat to the parts supply, the Premier publicly declared, "if this is intended as a challenge by foreign agitators then I am prepared to accept it". He further emphasized, "if the people of Ontario are prepared to accept the domination of Canadian industry by Lewis and his paid hirelings, them I will retire to my farm in Elgin county where I can forget responsibilities as far as public life is concerned." At the end of April, another Oshawa parts supplier, bumper manufacturer, Skinner Industries (now A.G. Simpson), joined the UAW. Shortly thereafter, Ontario Malleable and Fittings, Limited were unionized, signing with the AAISTW.

=== 1940 ===
In December 1939, the original contract between Ontario Malleable and the SWOC expired. Between December and March, the employees operated without a contract. The union cited allegations of favoritism during this period for non-union employees and sympathizers. Several meetings were held in March 1940 between the union and the company, ending with a strike that started on 27 March 1940. The employees requested an increase in hourly wage by 10 cents, and a 20% increase in pay for piece work.

Within days of the strike, pickets surrounded the plant attempting to prevent the company from removing patterns from the factory. Police intervention was necessary to enable the company to move the patterns. As tensions increased, final paychecks were distributed to the striking employees (for wages they had accrued up to the strike deadline), which included a letter from company management imploring the employees to meet separately with Ontario Malleable management without the union present. Days later, the union lashed out at management in the Oshawa Daily Times: blaming management for the strike. Harry Hamburgh, SWOC representative, was quoted: "re-opening of the plant depends on the company when it shows a genuine desire to discuss union requests through democratic collective bargaining." As tensions increased across Oshawa, Fittings Limited employees, also represented by SWOC, voted to strike.

Intervention by Louis Fine, chief conciliation officer from the Ontario Labour Department, brought the two sides together at the negotiating table. The 23-day strike was concluded, as a result, on 29 April 1940 with a signed agreement providing employees with a 7.5% increase in wages, a 9-hour day, 5 day work week and time-and-a-half for overtime work.

=== Further strikes ===
Further strikes followed in November 1945 and July 1966. The final lockout occurring in 1976 which lead to the plant's closure in 1977.

== Landmark nuisance suit ==
Local Oshawa residents were keenly aware of the pollution emitted from the foundry industry that included companies like Ontario Malleable and Fittings, Limited. In 1949, a transportation company by the name of Russell Transport assumed the site next to Ontario Malleable. Russell Transport had a practice of parking the vehicles they transported for General Motors, in their lot over night or for short periods of time. In 1951, damage to the body panels of the new vehicles was noted by General Motors and their dealership body. This damage was traced to the pollution that was being emitted by Ontario Malleable as a result of the emission of corrosive iron particulate matter and manganese sulphide. In 1951, Russell Transport brought suit in Ontario High Court in a case entitled, Russell Transport Ltd. et al. v. Ontario Malleable Iron Co. Ltd. The landmark case requested that the corrosive particles be reduced as Ontario Malleable employed no control mechanisms for either smoke or fumes.

The Chief Justice in the case, McRuer, sided on behalf of Russell indicating that OMIC had no right to pollute and that "it is no defence that the plaintiffs [Russell] came to the nuisance", and it is no defence, even though the nuisance though beneficial to the public at large. McRuer cited Lord Halsbury in Fleming v. Hislop, from 1886, in his response.

Chief Justice McRuer noted that the emission of the corrosive elements rendered Russell's property unfit for its intended usage. His ruling noted that the plaintiff had suffered and would continue to suffer, unless the "injurious substance [was] abated"; noting that the finish of automobiles can reasonably tolerate reasonable environmental concerns, he ordered that OMIC pay damages and he further ordered an injunction to take effect within six months prohibiting the harmful emissions.

== End of an era ==
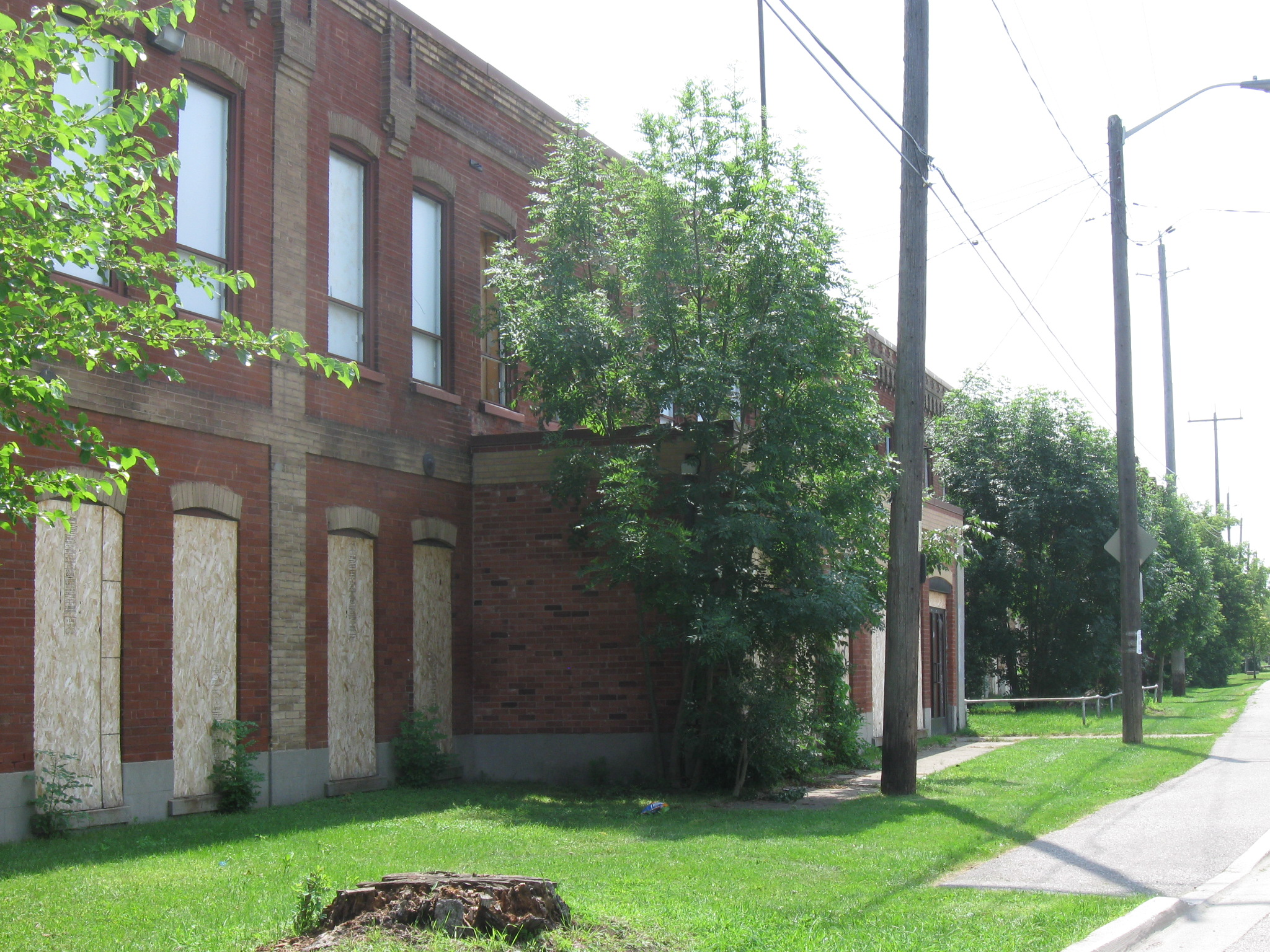
2015 photo OMIC derelict building

Ontario Malleable closed its doors on 16 March 1977, following a lockout that began 18 January 1976. Ontario Malleable was that time owned by ITT Grinnell, as Grinnell Mechanical Products had sold out to ITT in 1969. A labour dispute that started at the beginning of 1976, involved the workers requesting an additional $2.00 per hour in the following year. The company had offered an increase of $1.50 per hour over three years. When the workers rejected the company's offer, the company closed its doors indicating that it could not risk furnaces full of molten metal spoiling if left unattended by the lockout. The company cited a "slumping market place and general uncertain market conditions" in its decision to the shutter the plant. As ITT moved some of the manufacturing to a sister plant in Toronto, 224 employees of the Oshawa facility were out of work as a result of the closure.

Knob Hill Farms operated a big box food sales business in the building until 2000 when it too closed due to financial difficulties. Discussions originally began in 2011 to possibly convert the site into a GO Transit station, however, due to difficulties settling a purchase price, the plans for a GO station were set aside, in 2011. Concerns associated with the environmental condition of the property were cited in addition to the cost upgrading the facility as a result. In 2013, plans to expand the GO commuter line and expropriate the former OMIC facility. Plans for the construction of the new GO station, the "Ritson Road Station" include maintaining the façade of the Ontario Malleable plant is it is considered a heritage site. The remainder of the building would be demolished in favor of new construction.
