= 1997 Ontario teachers' strike =

Province-wide walkout by Ontario teachers

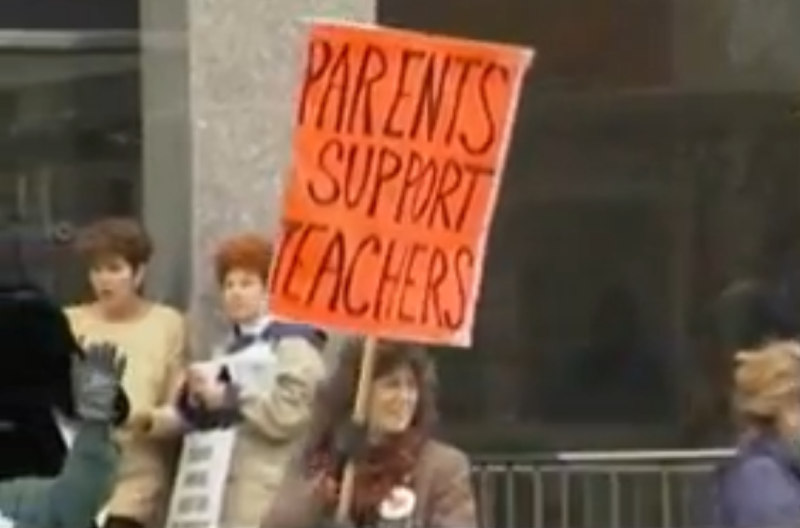
- A parent picketing in support of striking teachers
- Date: October 27 – November 10, 1997
- Location: Ontario, Canada
- Caused by: Opposition to educational reforms proposed by Bill 160
- Methods: Strike action and walkouts
- Result: Passing of Bill 160

Parties
| Ontario Teachers' Federation: AEFO; FWTAO; OECTA; OPSTF; OSSTF | Government of Ontario under the Progressive Conservative Party of Ontario: Mike Harris; David Johnson; John Snobelen |

Number
| 126,000 public and Catholic school teachers, plus school principals and vice-principals | |

The 1997 Ontario teachers' strike was a labour dispute between the government of Ontario under Premier Mike Harris of the Progressive Conservative Party of Ontario (PCs), and the Ontario Teachers' Federation (OTF) and its member labour unions. The strike occurred in the context of Harris' Common Sense Revolution, a program of deficit reduction characterized by cuts to education and social services. In September 1997, the PCs introduced Bill 160 (the Education Quality Improvement Act, 1997), which sought to reduce education spending and transfer numerous aspects of school administration from local school boards to the provincial government. In response, teachers participated in a province-wide walkout beginning on October 27, 1997.

The strike was the largest teachers' strike to ever occur in North America at the time, with walkouts by over 126,000 teachers resulting in the closure of nearly all of Ontario's 4,742 public schools. Despite opinion polling indicating that a majority of the public supported the striking teachers, the strike concluded on November 10, 1997, after the leadership of several teachers' unions instructed their members to return to work. The OTF ultimately failed to extract major concessions from the government, and Bill 160 passed on December 1, 1997.

== Context ==
In the 1995 Ontario general election, the Progressive Conservative Party of Ontario (PCs), under party leader Mike Harris, won a majority of the seats in the Legislative Assembly. The party campaigned on the "Common Sense Revolution", a platform of policies aimed at reducing the provincial deficit by lowering taxes and cutting public services. The PCs had an acrimonious relationship with the province's labour sector, particularly teachers' unions; in 1995, controversy erupted after a video leaked of Minister of Education and Training John Snobelen stating that the party needed to "invent a crisis" to generate public support for its plans to overhaul the province's education system. From 1995 to 1998, "Days of Action" were held as a series of rolling, one-day general strikes organized by labour unions in opposition to the Harris government.

On January 13, 1997, the PCs passed the Fewer School Boards Act, 1997 (Bill 104), which amalgamated school boards in the province and established the Education Improvement Commission to make further recommendations about reforms to Ontario's public education system. At the annual meeting of the Ontario Teachers' Federation (OTF) that March, a motion was passed to sanction the government if it sought to restrict collective bargaining rights for teachers; in a member-wide vote in May 1997, 84.2 percent of Ontario Secondary School Teachers' Federation (OSSTF) members voted in favour of province-wide action. The following month, the PCs introduced the Public Sector Transitions Stability Act, 1997 (Bill 136), which restructured public sector unions; the bill was amended in September after pressure from the Ontario Federation of Labour (OFL).

== History ==
=== Introduction of Bill 160 ===
External videos
- Mike Harris' televised address on October 22, 1997 via YouTube

On September 22, 1997, Snobelen introduced the Education Quality Improvement Act, 1997, more commonly known as Bill 160. Under Bill 160, responsibilities for multiple aspects of school administration would be transferred from local school boards to the provincial government. In particular, the bill would grant the province the ability to determine school funding, class sizes, the levying of school property taxes, and the number of hours allotted for teacher prep time; it would also permit non-certified teachers to instruct in public schools, and implement standardized testing for students. While the government stated that the purpose of Bill 160 was to "improve the performance of Ontario schoolchildren", critics of the bill argued that its true aim was to diminish the power of school boards and teachers unions, and that the passing of the bill would amount to CAD$1 billion in cuts to the province's education system and layoffs for up to 10,000 teachers. On September 25 the OTF threatened strike action if Bill 160 was passed, and from September 26 to October 10 held regional meetings and rallies across the province to prepare its membership for potential strike action. A rally organized by the OTF held at Maple Leaf Gardens on October 7, 1997, was attended by over 24,000 demonstrators.

In a cabinet shuffle on October 10, Harris replaced Snobelen as education minister with David Johnson, who on October 20 rejected the OTF's proposals to amend Bill 160. OTF President Eileen Lennon announced on October 22 that a province-wide teacher walkout would occur in protest of the bill; that same day, Harris denounced the planned walkout as an illegal strike in a televised address. On October 24, the Toronto Star published a leaked document indicating that deputy education minister Veronica Lacey would receive a bonus payment if she successfully cut $667 million from the province's education budget. The scandal lent credence to the OTF's claims that the primary goal of Bill 160 was to implement cuts, and forced the Harris government to acknowledge that it planned to reduce education spending.

=== Strike ===
Beginning on October 27, 1997, over 126,000 public and Catholic school teachers, principals, and vice principals participated in a province-wide walkout. At the time, the action was the largest teachers' strike to ever occur in North America. More than 2.1 million students were affected; nearly all of the province's 4,742 public schools were closed, with a few remaining open under the supervision of non-teaching staff. While the action was referred to as a "strike" in public discourse, it was technically a protest, as the demonstrators were opposing actions by the government rather than the school boards they were employed by; consequently, the demonstrators did not earn strike pay for the duration of the action. The strike was supported by the Canadian Auto Workers (CAW) and Canadian Union of Public Employees (CUPE), with CUPE president Sid Ryan calling for a general strike in support of the teachers.

Five hours after the strike commenced, the government announced that it intended to file an injunction to order teachers back to work. On October 28, the government rejected the OTF's proposal to end the strike, and announced plans to remove principals and vice principals from the union representing teachers. The government submitted its injunction to the Supreme Court of Ontario on October 31, which was rejected by justice James C. MacPherson on November 3. In his ruling, MacPherson dismissed the government's claim that the strike was causing "irreparable harm", and noted that the provisions of Bill 160 were broad enough to potentially invite a challenge under the Charter of Rights and Freedoms. He stated that the government's seeking of the injunction was "significantly premature", and that a ruling on the legality of the strike could only be obtained if the school boards who employed the striking teachers sought a decision from the Ontario Labour Relations Board. On November 4, negotiations between the OTF and government broke down, with no additional negotiations scheduled.

Prior to the strike, a Wright opinion poll found that 70 percent of Ontarians supported school reform, while 56 percent opposed a potential teacher walkout. As the strike progressed, public opinion shifted in favour of the teachers: Environics conducted daily opinion polls during the strike, which by the conclusion of the strike found that 63 percent of Ontarians felt that Bill 160 should be withdrawn in part or in full, while only 28 percent supported the government. An Angus Reid poll of Toronto residents found that while 55 percent supported the government at the start of the strike, by its conclusion, 54 percent supported the teachers.

=== Conclusion ===
The Toronto Star reported that union leadership discussed ending the strike on November 5, 1997, but that "determination on the part of union membership" led to a decision to continue the walkout. A rally attended by 22,000 demonstrators was held on November 6 in support of the teachers at Queen's Park; that same day, leaders of the Ontario Public School Teachers' Federation (OPSTF), the Federation of Women Teachers' Associations of Ontario (FWTAO), and the Association des enseignantes et des enseignants franco-ontariens (AEFO) announced that its members would return to work on November 10. On November 8, the Ontario English Catholic Teachers' Association (OECTA) announced its members would also return to work; the following day, the OSSTF announced that following an all-member vote, its members would also return to work. This brought an end to the strike, and on November 10, 1997, schools re-opened and teachers returned to work. At a union session held at the Hummingbird Centre in Toronto on November 14, the decision to end the strike was denounced by members, and union leaders were booed off the stage.

Bill 160 passed the legislature on December 1, 1997, and received royal assent on December 8, 1997. While the provisions that would have permitted the government to employ non-certified teachers were not included in the final text of the bill, the strike failed to extract any other major concessions from the government. While OSSTF President Earl Manners described the strike as a "phenomenal success", the Toronto Star noted that "when all is said and done, the teachers have achieved few of their goals in opposing Bill 160".

== Aftermath and legacy ==
In the 1999 election, the PCs lost 23 seats but nonetheless maintained their majority in the Legislative Assembly. Teachers' strikes would continue, albeit on a smaller and localized scale, for the remainder of the PCs' tenure in office. In 1998, teachers in seven Greater Toronto Area school districts were locked out by school boards following a breakdown in labour negotiations; that same year, teachers in York Region were locked out in response to teachers working-to-rule. Teachers in the Simcoe Muskoka Catholic District School Board went on strike twice in 2002, while teachers in the Toronto Catholic District School Board went on strike in 2003. Though the Ontario Liberal Party would win a majority government in the 2003 election, few of the reforms implemented by Bill 160 were reversed by the Liberals; in a 2020 interview, Snobelen noted that Bill 160 had become the "foundation of education in the province".

Former OSSTF Toronto President Leslie Wolfe referred to the protests as a "pivotal moment" for issues surrounding education funding and governance in Ontario, noting that "it is not hyperbole to suggest that today’s education union political activism was born of the Harris Tory time in power, and his government's determination to vilify publicly funded education and its teachers." Former OTF president Eileen Lennon attributed the protest's failure to an inability by the union to plan an exit strategy, writing in a commemoration of the 10th anniversary of the protests that "by the end of the second week of the protest, it was clear that the government was going to ram the legislation through. They were not going to make any substantial amendments or withdraw it."

Douglas Nesbitt of the University of Manitoba argues that the failure of the protests can be owed to an ideological split among leaders of the teachers' unions between those who opposed the Days of Action and wished to focus on electoral efforts to support the Ontario New Democratic Party (NDP), and those who supported the Days of Action and opposed the NDP following the party's shift to austerity policies under premier Bob Rae. This factionalism among union leadership, Nesbitt argues, resulted in an unwillingness to escalate the scale of demonstrations; he notes that in the wake of the strike's failure, organized labour in Ontario retreated from extra-political action to pursue a strategy of electoralism. Alan Sears of Ryerson University (now Toronto Metropolitan University) similarly argues that the 1997 strike "represented the end point of a longer term mobilization dating back to the Social Contract" passed by the NDP, and that the failure of the strike combined with the end of the Days of Action campaign "took much of the wind out of the sails of the opposition on the education front".

During and after the strike, the parents' group People for Education organized an awareness ribbon campaign, with supporters of the teachers encouraged to wear apple green-coloured ribbons. The 1997 strike is frequently invoked by media during coverage of subsequent labour disputes between the Ontario government and teachers' unions, such as during the rotating teachers' strikes of 2012, 2019, and 2020.

== See also ==
- Metro Toronto Elementary Teacher's strike
- S.O.S. Montfort
