= Ontario College of Teachers =

Professional regulatory body

- Abbreviation: OCT
- Formation: 20 May 1997; 29 years ago
- Type: Professional regulatory body
- Headquarters: Toronto, Ontario, Canada
- Location: Ontario, Canada
- Chair: Diana Miles
- Registrar and CEO: Linda Lacroix
- Revenue: $38.4 million (2016)
- Expenses: $38.1 million (2016)
- Website: oct.ca

The Ontario College of Teachers (OCT; French: Ordre des enseignantes et des enseignants de l'Ontario [OEEO]) is the regulatory college for the teaching profession in Ontario and is the largest self-regulatory body in Canada. It was established on 20 May 1997. The college's mandate is to license, govern and regulate the practice of teaching. It is also responsible for developing standards of teaching practice, regulating ongoing teacher certification and professional development, and accrediting teacher education programs. The College of Teachers also has the responsibility to investigate claims of misconduct made against teachers. The Ontario College of Teachers is also mandated to communicate with the public on behalf of the profession, which it does primarily through its website.

Teachers and principals employed by publicly funded schools (primary or secondary, English or French, "public" or Catholic) are required to be members of the college in good standing. College membership is not compulsory for teaching in a private school, but some schools might require it and some teachers are members voluntarily. The college maintains a database of teachers and their qualifications, which is available to the public on the college's website.

== Public interest ==
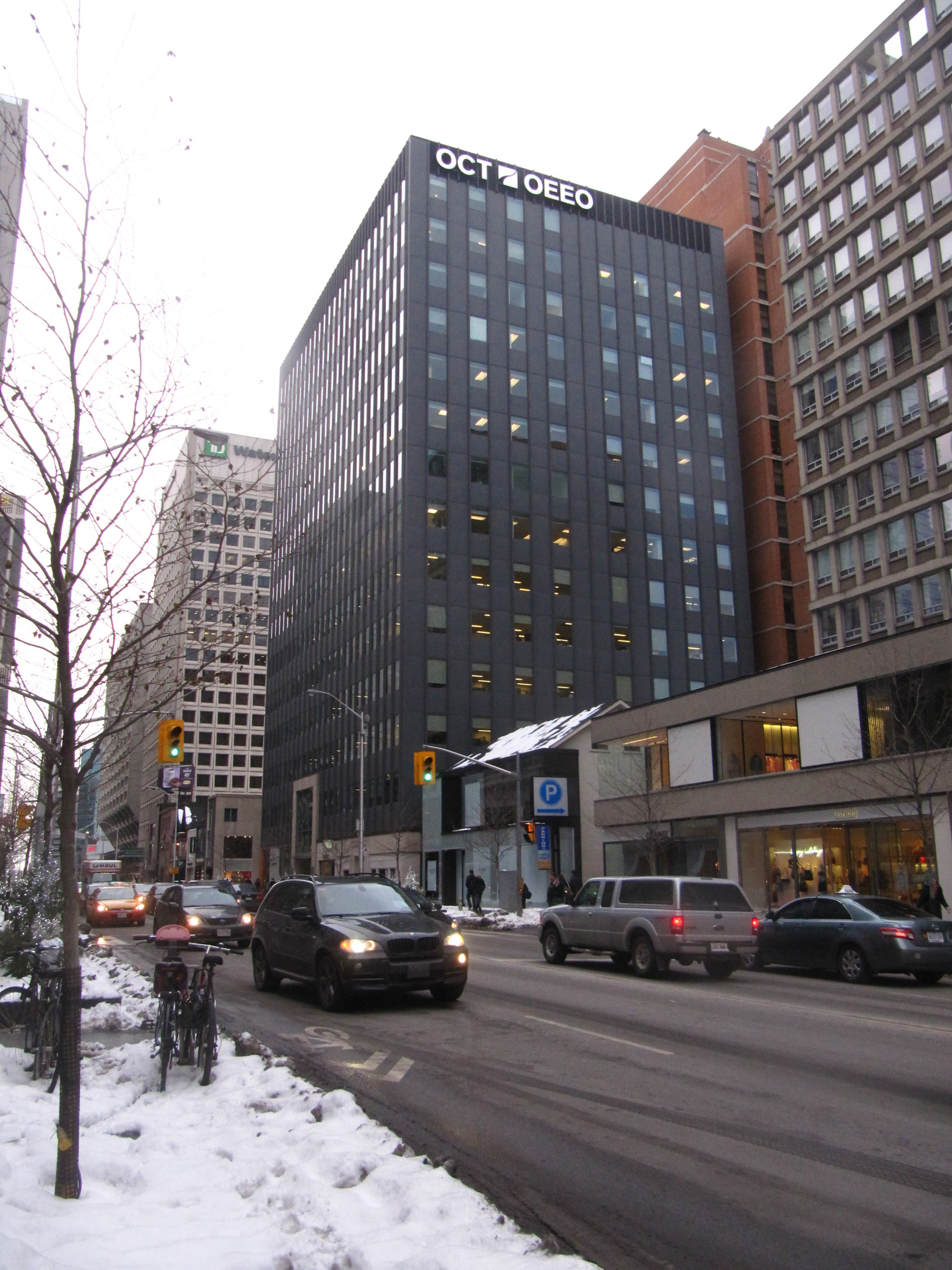
Ontario College of Teachers building on Bloor Street in Toronto

The college has a duty to serve and protect the public interest, but is often criticised for being an extension of the government. The public has elected representatives on the college council which allows input into the operation of the college. College policies and initiatives are developed to maintain and improve excellence as perceived by the members of the council and council administration. Disciplinary hearings are open to the public but are not normally available to the public as cases are transferred to the Toronto administrative buildings in downtown Toronto. The college offers its members and the public copies of discipline committee decisions that are heavily edited by staff and posted on its website.

== Governance ==
The college is governed by a 12-member council. 6 council members must be Ontario Certified Teachers in good standing and the other 6 must be members of the public who are not now, and never been, a member of the teaching profession. Council is established through a competency-based application and selection process. Applications are accepted year-round and will be held for review until the annual selection process, which occurs at the end of each calendar year.

== Secrecy ==
In 2011, the Ontario College of Teachers was criticized for keeping secret the names of teachers who were allowed to teach in Ontario classrooms even after committing crimes against children. The Toronto Star found that out of 49 cases published by the Ontario College of Teachers in 2010, 35 such cases kept the teacher anonymous.

In the summer of 2011, the college commissioned former Ontario Chief Justice Patrick LeSage to evaluate its discipline processes and practices. Nine months and 49 recommendations later, he has given the college a self-endorsed mandate. No parents, parent groups, parent councils, victims of abuse by educators or critics of the college were asked to submit concerns. The report cost $500,000 and was paid for by the teachers of the province. In June 2012, the college council approved the recommendations including a recommendations that allows repeat sex offenders to return to teaching after five years.

Since the Toronto Star started an investigation of the cases held secret by the Ontario College of Teachers, the Ontario government has made the Ontario College of Teachers publish any cases that have been held in public hearings. This does not include cases that have been determined by closed door legal agreements. Therefore, parents may now determine if their child's teacher who has passed a criminal record check has in fact been found guilty of such crimes as sexual assault, kidnapping, physical assault, impaired driving and so on. Parents may now be able to place the teacher's name in the discipline registry to determine if their child is being taught by a convicted criminal.

== See also ==
- Association des enseignantes et des enseignants franco-ontariens
- Education in Ontario
- Elementary Teachers' Federation of Ontario
- Ontario Certified Teacher
- Ontario English Catholic Teachers' Association
- Ontario Secondary School Teachers' Federation
