= Elementary Teachers of Toronto =

Local union of the Elementary Teachers' Federation of Ontario

- Abbreviation: ETT
- Formation: June 1998; 28 years ago
- Type: Local union
- Location: Toronto, Ontario, Canada
- Members: 11,000
- President: Helen Victoros
- Parent organization: Elementary Teachers' Federation of Ontario
- Affiliations: Toronto & York Region Labour Council
- Website: ett.ca

The Elementary Teachers of Toronto (ETT) is a Canadian labour union and the Toronto local of the Elementary Teachers' Federation of Ontario. The organization's members are the full-time public elementary teachers employed by the Toronto District School Board (TDSB).

The local was formed in June 1998 through the merger of 13 former Toronto elementary teacher locals.

== Governance ==
The organization is a governed by a member-approved constitution.

The business of the local is conducted by an elected executive, composed of three Table Officers (President, Vice-President, and Secretary/Treasurer) and 11 Executive Officers. Each Executive Officer represents two of the TDSB's 22 wards. Officers are elected for two-year terms. The current president is Helen Victoros. The current vice president is Nigel Barriffe.

Members are also represented by Regional Organizers (one per TDSB ward) and at least one Steward per school. Both representatives liaise between teachers and Executive Officers.

ETT is represented on the board of the Toronto & York Region Labour Council.

== Response to Bill 115 ==
In response to the passage of the Putting Students First Act (Bill 115), by the Legislative Assembly of Ontario, the membership of the Elementary Teachers of Toronto engaged in several forms of organized protest, including, most notably, a one-day strike action on December 18, 2012.

=== One-day strike action ===
On December 18, 2012, Toronto public elementary teachers participated in a one-day strike action to protest Bill 115 and the legislation’s perceived negative impact on local collective bargaining. The walkout closed 474 schools in Toronto, affecting 173,480 elementary students. An estimated 12,000 Toronto public elementary teachers engaged in the labour action.

The strike was dubbed "Super Tuesday" in the media, due to its size and scope.

=== Rally at the Ministry of Education ===
On January 15, 2013, Toronto-local members organized a protest in front of the Ontario Ministry of Education building, on Bay Street. The rally drew hundreds of protestors, forcing police to divert traffic and close down part of the street.

=== Rally at the 2013 Ontario Liberal leadership convention ===
The Toronto local, in coordination with the other public elementary teacher locals in the GTA, held a demonstration on January 25, 2013, on Carlton Street in front of Maple Leaf Gardens, the site of the 2013 Ontario Liberal Party leadership election. The size of protest, estimated in the hundreds, prompted police to close a section of Carlton Street outside the convention.

== School closures ==
In January 2015, the Ontario Ministry of Education released a report indicating that 84 TDSB elementary schools fell under the ministry’s definition of underutilized (less than 65 per cent capacity), and could potentially be closed. The TDSB, following directives from Ontario Minister of Education Liz Sandals, conducted its own review, refining the list of underutilized elementary schools to 48.

ETT reviewed the 48 elementary schools highlighted by the TDSB using the data collected by the board to rank schools by external challenges to students (family income, levels of social assistance, family education, and preponderance of lone parent families). ETT’s report concluded that the majority of the schools being considered for closure fell within the areas of Toronto the TDSB considers to be the poorest and to have the fewest learning opportunities.

== See also ==
- Education in Ontario
- Elementary Teachers' Federation of Ontario
- Ontario Secondary School Teachers' Federation
