= Oct =

Oct or OCT may refer to:

== Biology and medicine ==
- Optical coherence tomography, an imaging method
- Organic cation transport protein, a type of protein
- Optimal cutting temperature compound, used in histology
- Oncology clinical trial, a clinical trial in cancer research
- Oxytocin challenge test, a type of contraction stress test in late stage pregnancy
- Obsessive compulsive tendencies, a criterion involved in the diagnosis of obsessive-compulsive disorder

== Mathematics ==
- Octal, abbreviated oct, the base-8 number system
- Octahedron, sometimes abbreviated oct, a regular polyhedron
- Odd cycle transversal, a concept in graph theory

== Science and technology ==
- Octave, symbol: oct., a unit of measurement in electronics
- Octans, abbreviation: Oct, a constellation
- Office of the Chief Technologist, a manager at the NASA Institute for Advanced Concepts
- Optical coherence tomography, an imaging method
- Olefin conversion technology, a method in industrial chemistry
- Office Customisation Tool, available in some versions of Microsoft Office 2007

== Chinese places and companies ==
- Overseas Chinese Town, (narrowly) a theme park or (broadly) an area in Shenzhen
  - OCT Tower, a skyscraper in Overseas Chinese Town
  - Overseas Chinese Town station (OCT Station), a metro station in Shenzhen
- Overseas Chinese Town Limited, a company
- OCT Harbour, a retail development in Shenzhen

== Other uses ==
- Oct., an abbreviation for the month of October, the tenth month of the year
- Ontario College of Teachers, a professional self-regulatory body
  - Ontario Certified Teacher, a professional designation from the Ontario College of Teachers
- Orangi Charitable Trust, a Pakistani microfinance organisation
- Orion correlation theory, a fringe theory in Egyptology
- Overseas countries and territories, special territories in relation to the European Union
- Oxford Classical Texts, a book series
- Oklahoma City Thunder, an American basketball team
- Octuple scull, an eight-man racing shell found in the sport of rowing

== See also ==
- OTC (disambiguation)
