= 1987 Metro Toronto Elementary teachers' strike =

Industrial action carried out in Canada

The Metro Toronto Elementary teachers' strike was a month-long labour dispute that saw nearly 10,000 elementary teachers with the then Metropolitan Public School Board in Metro Toronto, Ontario, Canada, walk off the job in a bid to achieve more preparation time. The strike ran from September 21 to October 18, 1987.

The strike involved members of CUPE (Locals 1325, 808 and 134) and OPSEU (mistakenly identified as OPSUE).

After negotiations the requested preparation time led to compromise for 100 minutes and eventually 120 minutes.

== List of school board disputes and strikes ==
Before 1987 there is one notable event:

- 1975–1976: Metro Toronto School board teacher with OSSTF went on strike for two months after contract dispute was unresolved. In January 1976 the Davis Conservative government passed back to school legislation to end what was the longest education strike in Ontario.

Since 1987 there have been other labour actions in Toronto and beyond:

- 1997 Ontario teachers' strike: teachers, joined by principals and vice-principal went on strike province wide in protest to changes to classroom time under the proposals under Bill 160. The strike last two weeks and resulted in 2.1 million students out of classrooms in primary and secondary schools. The Harris Conservative government did not yield to the demands and the bill eventual passed.
- 1998: staff from eight school boards around Ontario went on strike after being locked out and lasted 15 days and impacted 210,000 students. The Harris government brought in back to school legislation to end the job action with support from the NDP and Liberals.
- 1998: Rotating strike commenced in York Region District School Board at 108 elementary schools in response to being locked out for five days. Staff voiced concerns with pay and work conditions.
- 2002: Three week strike by staff at Catholic secondary schools in Simcoe Muskoka was resolved when the Eves' Conservative government forced back to school legislation. Less than a month later the Catholic elementary schools in the same Catholic board commenced a two week strike that was resolved by arbitration between the board and staff.
- 2003: Toronto Catholic District School Board elementary schools were locked out for 12 days over wages. The Eves' Conservatives passed back to work legislation ended the strike.
- 2012: walkout of teachers from Toronto, Peel and Durham public elementary boards (and later by Greater Essex, Lambton-Kent, Waterloo, Grand Erie and Near North boards). McGuinty Liberal government countered with Bill 115 forced the end to enforce changes to their members ability to strike that was later repealed.
- 2013: While no strike occurred, a one-day walkout by teachers province wide in protest against imposed changes by the province.
