= Ontario Public School Boards' Association =

- Abbreviation: OPSBA
- Formation: 1988
- Type: Non-profit association
- Headquarters: Toronto, Ontario
- Region served: Ontario
- Members: 31 English public district school boards and 10 school authorities
- Website: www.opsba.org

The Ontario Public School Boards' Association (OPSBA) is a non-profit organization that represents English public district school boards and public school authorities across Ontario, Canada. Founded in 1988 through the amalgamation of three predecessor associations, it serves as the collective voice for boards that together oversee the education of approximately 1.3 million elementary and secondary students.

== Role and activities ==
OPSBA advocates for public education policy and represents its member boards in province-wide collective bargaining with education unions, including the Elementary Teachers' Federation of Ontario (ETFO) and the Ontario Secondary School Teachers' Federation (OSSTF). The association also provides professional development and governance resources for school board trustees.
