= Timeline of strikes in 1997 =

Strikes in 1997

In 1997, a number of labour strikes, labour disputes, and other industrial actions occurred.

== Background ==
A labour strike is a work stoppage caused by the mass refusal of employees to work. This can include wildcat strikes, which are done without union authorisation, and slowdown strikes, where workers reduce their productivity while still carrying out minimal working duties. It is usually a response to employee grievances, such as low pay or poor working conditions. Strikes can also occur to demonstrate solidarity with workers in other workplaces or pressure governments to change policies.

== Timeline ==
=== Continuing strikes from 1996 ===
- 1991–1998 Caterpillar labor dispute, including strikes by Caterpillar Inc. workers in the United States.
- Detroit newspaper strike of 1995–1997, over unfair labour practices.
- 1990s Donbas miners' strikes
- 1991 Frontier strike, over 6-years long strike by workers at the New Frontier Hotel and Casino, represented by the Culinary Workers Union, one of the longest strikes in American history.
- 1995–97 Mexican street sweepers' strike, including a 97-day hunger strike by street sweepers in Villahermosa.
- 1996–1997 strikes in South Korea
- Liverpool dockers' dispute, 850-day dispute in Liverpool in the United Kingdom.
- 1996–97 San Francisco Symphony strike, 9-week strike by San Francisco Symphony musicians.
- 1996–97 University of Ouagadougou strike, 3-month strike by students at the University of Ouagadougou, Burkina Faso.

=== January ===
- 1997 Ecuadorian general strike, general strike in Ecuador against the government of Abdalá Bucaram.
- 1997 Greek seamen's strike
- 1997 Venezuelan university strike, 3-month strike by university teachers in Venezuela.

=== February ===
- 1997 Colombian general strike, general strike in Colombia against austerity.
- 1997 Honduran medical strike, strike by healthcare workers in Honduras.
- 1997 Palestinian teachers' strike, 3-week strike over wages.
- 1997 Severodvinsk strike, strike by military shipbuilders in Severodvinsk, Russia, over unpaid wages.
- 1997 Spanish truckers' strike
- 1997 Swaziland general strike

=== March ===
- March 1997 Palestinian general strike, general strike in Palestine over the Israeli government's approval of settlements on Jabal Abu Ghneim.
- 1997 Spanish bullfighters' strike
- 1997 York University strike, 2-month strike by York University faculty in Canada.

=== April ===
- Dead City Strike, general strike in Zaire against the government of Mobutu Sese Seko.
- 1997 Goodyear strike, strike by Goodyear Tire and Rubber Company workers in the United States.
- 1997 Indian truckers' strike
- 1997 Malawi civil servants' strike, demanding implementation of the Chatsika Report.
- 1997 Nike strikes, strikes by Nike, Inc. factory workers in Indonesia and Vietnam.

=== May ===
- 1997 Curragh miners' strike, 15-week strike by Curragh coal mine miners in Australia.
- 1997 Sierra Leone public sector strike

=== June ===
- 1997 Film Employees Federation of South India strike

=== July ===
- 1997 Brazilian police strike, strike by police in Brazil over wages.
- 1997 Fiji sugar strike, strike by Fiji Sugar Corporation workers over health and safety standards.

=== August ===
- 1997 Argentina football strike, strike by football players in Argentina after Deportivo Español refused to let players with expired contracts leave the club.
- 1997 Norwegian oil workers' strike, 6-week strike by offshore drilling oil workers in Norway.
- 1997 United Parcel Service strike, 18-day strike by United Parcel Service workers in the United States.

=== October ===
- 1997 Achisay Polymetal protest, protest by Achisay Polymetal Plant workers in Kentau, Kazakhstan, over unpaid wages.
- 1997 Chilean football strike, strike by football players in Chile after San Marcos de Arica fired all of its players.
- 1997 Columbia University strike, strike by clerical workers at Columbia University in the United States.
- 1997 Ontario teachers' strike, against the education policies of Mike Harris.
- 1997 Uniroyal strike, 2-month strike at a Uniroyal Goodrich Tire Company plant in Woodburn, Indiana, United States, over layoffs.

=== November ===
- 1997 Canada Post strike
- 1997–98 Finnish firefighters' strike, 3-month strike by firefighters in Finland
- 1997–98 Maple Leaf Foods strike, strike by Maple Leaf Foods meatpackers in Canada.
- 1997 Moulin Rouge strike, strike by Moulin Rouge stagehands in France.

=== December ===
- 1997 Israeli general strike, general strike in Israel over pensions, organised by the Histadrut.

== Commentary ==
According to the State Conciliator of Norway, there was only one major strike in Norway in 1997.
