= British Columbia College of Teachers =

Regulatory body for teachers

The British Columbia College of Teachers (BCCT) was formerly the professional self-regulatory body for teachers in British Columbia. It was responsible for setting and enforcing standards for teachers in the province. It assessed applicants to the profession and issued teaching certificates.

In 2011, in a report commissioned by the Government of British Columbia, the BCCT was deemed dysfunctional and, consequently, the organization was abolished and replaced by the Teacher Regulation Branch of the B.C. government Ministry of Education on January 9, 2012.

== Court cases involving the BCCT ==
- Trinity Western University v. British Columbia College of Teachers
- Kempling v. The British Columbia College of Teachers

== See also ==
- British Columbia Teachers' Federation (BCTF)
