= William Zhou =

Canadian internet entrepreneur (born 1992)

- Born: Zhou Weizheng; February 18, 1992 (age 34); Beijing, China
- Education: University of Waterloo
- Occupation: CEO at Chalk.com

William Zhou (Chinese: 周惟正; born February 18, 1992) is a Canadian internet entrepreneur. In 2012, Zhou co-founded Chalk.com, a K-12 education software company. He has appeared as a frequent commentator on major networks, a speaker at Bloomberg Next Big Thing Conference, and was named in Forbes 30 Under 30.

== Early life and education ==
Zhou was born in Beijing, China and immigrated to Vancouver, British Columbia, Canada. He attributes his interest in computers to his parents. He graduated from Point Grey Secondary before attending David R. Cheriton School of Computer Science at University of Waterloo. He is known in high school for his work on an online student discussion forum and his commitment to the student body. At Waterloo, he co-founded Chalk.com (formerly known as Planboard). In 2015, Zhou was named in Forbes' Top 30 Under 30 in Education.

== Entrepreneur ==
Zhou first came to prominence as a young entrepreneur at the age of 16 with the founding of Design Vetica, a web consultancy with clients from University of British Columbia, Red Cross, and Amnesty International. The organization was best known for Draftboard, an online tool for designer and clients to collaborate. In 2011, Zhou sold Draftboard for an undisclosed amount.

== Chalk.com ==
Zhou received the inspiration for Chalk.com as he observed the administrative workload from his own high school teachers. He noticed that teachers are overwhelmed with tasks such as lesson planning, assessment, and evaluation. Zhou created Planboard to help teachers plan their lessons easier. Planboard received $25,000 from the University of Waterloo Velocity Venture Fund in 2012.

By mid-2013, Planboard had gained significant users. Zhou participated in the Lightspeed Ventures' Summer Fellowship. Planboard placed second in the Singapore Management University Lee Kuan Yew Global Business Plan Competition. Planboard also partnered with the Ontario Teachers' Federation to provide ready made lesson plan resources.

In 2014, Chalk.com, the parent company of Planboard, expanded into assessment tools. Today, Chalk.com is used in over 20,000 schools and has over 200,000 teachers.

In 2017, Blackboard Inc. and Chalk.com announced a partnership to deliver a best-in-class digital gradebook and portfolio for K-12 educators. The offering will provide teachers and parents with insights into student performance.
