= List of Tumbukas =

This is a list of notable Tumbuka people, a Bantu people of Southern Africa.

== Musicians ==
- Theresa Phondo, gospel and Afro-R&B musician and worship leader

== Journalists ==
- Edgar Chibaka

== Sports ==
- Mwayi Kumwenda (Malawian best female international netball player)
- Bridget Kumwenda (female netball player)
- Chiukepo Msowoya (Malawian footballer)
- Robert Ng'ambi (former Malawian footballer)
- Tamika Mkandawire (former professional footballer)
- Loreen Ngwira (netball player)
- Towera Vinkhumbo (netball player)
- Russell Mwafulirwa (Football player)
- Gabadinho Mhango (Football Player)

== Politicians ==
- Chakufwa Chihana (human rights activist, pro-democracy advocate, trade unionist and politician)
- Rose Chibambo (Malawian prominent female politician)
- Dindi Gowa Nyasulu ( engineer, politician and former head of AFORD)
- Rodwell Munyenyembe (politician and former Speaker of the National Assembly)
- Richard Msowoya (Politician and former speaker of National Assembly of Malawi
- Duwi Chisiza (Politician and former Minister)
- Yatuta Chisiza (Politician and former Minister)
- Kampunga Mwafulirwa (Politician and former deputy Minister)
- Uchizi Mkandawire (Politician and Minister)
- Kamlepo Kalua (Politician)

== Religious leaders ==
- Shepherd Bushiri (prophet and businessman)

== Ministers ==
- Goodall Gondwe (economist and former Minister of Finance of Malawi)
- Agnes Nyalonje (Minister of Education of Malawi)
