= Kempling =

Kempling is a surname. Notable people with the surname include:

- Bill Kempling (1921–1996), Canadian politician
- Chris Kempling (born 1955), Canadian educator
