= OTC =

OTC may refer to:

== Finance ==
- Over-the-counter (finance)
- One time charge, for example in the big bath technique
- Order to cash process

== Medicine ==
- Over-the-counter drug
- Oxytetracycline

== Biochemistry ==
- Ornithine transcarbamylase, also called OTC gene or ornithine carbamoyltransferase

== Computer science and technology ==
- On-tape Catalog, a section of a Microsoft Tape Format file
- OpenType Collection (OTC), a file format for bundling multiple OpenType fonts
- Orbiter test conductor, part of NASA's Launch Control Center

== Arts, entertainment, and media ==
- Offworld Trading Company, a real-time strategy video game
- The Olivia Tremor Control, a band
- Opera Theatre Company, merged with Wide Open Opera in 2017 to form Irish National Opera
- OTC (band), a Congolese soukous group
- Roman Reigns, a professional wrestler whose nickname is "The OTC"

== Brands and enterprises ==
- Oliver Typewriter Company, a former US company
- Open Text Corporation, a Canadian software company
- Oriental Trading Company, based in Omaha, Nebraska
- Oshkosh Truck Corporation, former name of the Oshkosh Corporation
- OTC Markets Group, a private company that provides services to the US over-the-counter securities market
- OTC Tool Company, originally the Owatonna Tool Company

== Organizations ==
=== Education ===
- Oakwood Technology College, in Rotherham, South Yorkshire
- Okefenokee Technical College, in Waycross and Alma, in the US state of Georgia
- Ozarks Technical Community College, in Springfield, Missouri
- Roy Campanella Occupational Training Center, public high school in Brooklyn, New York

=== Government ===
- Office of Transportation Cooperatives
- Ohio Turnpike Commission
- Oklahoma Tax Commission
- Overseas Telecommunications Commission, Australia's former international telecommunications service

=== Military ===
- Officer in tactical command
- Officers' Training Corps

=== Other organizations ===
- Offshore Technology Conference, an organization that holds conferences on offshore energy technology, based in Houston, Texas
- One Thousand Children, child survivors of the Holocaust who fled to America without their parents
- Oregon Track Club, an athletic association

== Places ==
- Bol-Bérim Airport, by IATA-Code
- Oceanside Transit Center
- Odenton Town Center
- Ogilvie Transportation Center, Chicago, Illinois
- Overlake Transit Center
- United States Olympic Training Center, training facility for US Olympic and Paralympic athletes

== See also ==
- Oct (disambiguation)
