= NSTU =

The acronym NSTU may refer to:

- Public JSC Suspilne (abbr. NSTU), Ukrainian public broadcaster
- Pago Pago International Airport, a public airport of the United States (code: NSTU).
- Noakhali Science & Technology University, a public university of Bangladesh.
- Nova Scotia Teachers Union, a labour organization in Canada.
- Novosibirsk State Technical University, a public university of Russia.
