= Chris Kempling =

Canadian educator (born 1955)

- Born: Christopher Stephen Myles Kempling; October 15, 1955 (age 71)
- Education: Doctor of Psychology (California Coast Univ.)
- Occupation: Retired Counsellor
- Known for: Kempling v. British Columbia College of Teachers 2005 BCCA 327.

Christopher Stephen Myles Kempling (born October 15, 1955) is a Canadian educator who was suspended by the British Columbia College of Teachers and disciplined by the Quesnel School District for anti-gay comments in letters to the editor of the Quesnel Cariboo Observer. Kempling challenged the suspension in court, arguing that his right to freedom of expression had been violated. The British Columbia Court of Appeal ruled against him, ruling that limitations on his freedom of expression were justified by the school's duty to maintain a tolerant and discrimination-free environment. Kempling filed a complaint with the British Columbia Human Rights Tribunal alleging that the disciplinary action taken against him by the school district infringed his freedom of religion; this complaint was dismissed on similar grounds.

Conservative commentators have described Kempling's case as an example of how gay rights in Canada have come into conflict with freedom of expression and religious freedom, while others have used it to highlight the importance of combating discrimination in public schools.

He has also run for elected office on two occasions with the Christian Heritage Party of Canada.

== 2002 suspension ==
=== Letters to the editor ===
Kempling had been employed as a teacher and counsellor by the Quesnel School District at a high school in Quesnel, British Columbia since 1990. In 1997 he began to write a series of letters to the editor of a local newspaper, the Quesnel Cariboo Observer, disagreeing with the way that homosexuality was being presented in the curriculum. With regard to homosexuality, he claimed:

I refuse to be a false teacher saying that promiscuity is acceptable, perversion is normal, and immorality is simply 'cultural diversity' of which we should be proud.

Among other things, Kempling objected that the British Columbia Teachers' Federation, the union that represents teachers in British Columbia, was distributing literature produced by the Gay and Lesbian Educators of BC which in his view was erroneous. He also cited various studies that he interprets as showing harm caused by what he described as the "homosexual lifestyle". Kempling, an advocate of conversion therapy, wrote:

"Sexual orientations can be changed and the success rate for those who seek help is high. My hope is students who are confused over their sexual orientation will come to see me. It could save their life."

The American Psychological Association finds insufficient evidence supporting the idea that sexual orientation can be changed and notes that conversion therapy can be harmful, while the American Psychiatric Association questions the scientific validity of the theories behind conversion therapy, notes reports of harm, and actively recommends against it.

For these letters, Kempling was cited in May 2001 for conduct unbecoming by the British Columbia College of Teachers (BCCT), the body which regulates the teaching profession in British Columbia. This led to a hearing in May 2002 before the BCCT Disciplinary Committee, which ruled that Kempling's statements could create an environment that was hostile and discriminatory to gay and lesbian students and suspended him for one month.

=== Court challenge ===
Kempling challenged his suspension in court, arguing that his treatment violated his rights to free expression because he wrote the letters on his own time, he was expressing common social conservative opinions, and there were no complaints to the school board or the BCCT from the public prior to the disciplinary action. He also said that it was a violation of his religious freedom rights as his views are based on his religious beliefs.

In a 2004 ruling, the Supreme Court of British Columbia upheld the BCCT disciplinary action. Kempling appealed this ruling to the British Columbia Court of Appeal, which affirmed the lower court's decision in 2005. The three-judge Court of Appeal panel found that Kempling's statements were discriminatory as they were "based on stereotypical notions about homosexuality and demonstrate a willingness to judge individuals on the basis of those stereotypes." While harm to individual staff or students was not established, the Court found that discriminatory statements by a teacher regarding his or her professional duties necessarily harmed the integrity of the school system. Kempling's right to freedom of expression under Section Two of the Canadian Charter of Rights and Freedoms was found to have been breached, but this limit was found to be reasonable under Section One, given the importance of "ensuring a tolerant and discrimination-free environment, and restoring and upholding the integrity of the school system." The Court determined that, as Kempling had not introduced evidence to identify his religion or establish its tenets, no violation of his right to freedom of religion could be established.

Intervening on Kempling's behalf in the Court of Appeal hearing were the Evangelical Fellowship of Canada, the Catholic Civil Rights League, the Christian Teachers Association, The Christian Legal Fellowship, and the British Columbia Teachers' Federation. The British Columbia Civil Liberties Association and the British Columbia Public School Employers' Association intervened on behalf of the BCCT.

Leave to appeal the Court of Appeal's ruling to the Supreme Court of Canada was denied in January, 2006.

== 2004 letter of reprimand ==
=== CBC Radio interviews ===
While his appeals were in process, Kempling was interviewed by CBC Radio in January, 2003, and made statements similar to those he had expressed in his letters. In response to this, his school district wrote him a letter instructing him not to express his views on homosexuality in any school setting or publish them elsewhere. In January, 2004, Kempling was interviewed by CBC Radio North, this time about the private counselling service that he was advertising in Prince George, which offered therapy for gay men who want to become straight.

This interview became the rationale for a formal letter of reprimand from the Quesnel School District, which concluded that Kempling had contravened their earlier instructions. The disciplinary action was taken with the stated goal of "ensur[ing] that there is no poisoned environment for either students in schools or staff working in Board facilities in the District. District schools must remain places where there is sensitivity to issues and where an atmosphere of tolerance and respect exist."

=== Human Rights Tribunal complaint ===
In response to this disciplinary action, Kempling complained to the British Columbia Human Rights Tribunal that his religious freedom was being infringed. In November, 2005, the Tribunal ruled that the comments made in the interview were similar to the statements which the Court of Appeal had found to be discriminatory. Concluding that the Quesnel School District would be able to establish that the restrictions placed on Kempling formed a bona fide occupational requirement necessary to "ensur[e] the school system is free from discriminatory attitudes about homosexuals," the tribunal dismissed the complaint.

== Further disciplinary action ==
In 2005, while his case was before the Human Rights Tribunal, Kempling became the Christian Heritage Party of Canada candidate in the riding of Cariboo—Prince George. In that capacity, Kempling wrote another letter to the editor criticizing the recently proposed Bill C-38, the Civil Marriage Act, which allowed same-sex couples to marry. Quesnel School District suspended him for three months as a breach of its earlier direction.

On 28 January 2008, Kempling was cited again by the BCCT for "conduct unbecoming a teacher." The citation is based on events that occurred between February 2003 and April 2005, including the following allegations:

Mr. Kempling made derogatory statements against homosexuals or otherwise promoted discrimination against homosexuals as illustrated by one or more of the following:

1. Mr Kempling participated in a radio interview aired by the CBC on February 11, 2003:
  - in that interview, Mr. Kempling described homosexuality as "immoral" and a "barrier to salvation";
  - that CBC program quoted writings previously made by Mr. Kempling against homosexuality; and,
  - Mr. Kempling provided to the interviewer written material that the College Decision determined to be discriminatory and derogatory towards homosexuals.
2. In November, 2003, Mr. Kempling published his essay entitled "the Great Divide: Ethical Divisions between Social Liberals and Social Conservatives Regarding Sexual Behaviour" on two websites, a BCTF Listserv and the BC Parents and Teachers for Life website.
3. Mr Kempling also provided his essay "The Great Divide…" to the Calgary Herald in which it was published on December 27, 2003.
4. In or about December, 2003, Mr. Kempling provided his article entitled "Sexual Orientation Curricula: Implications for Educators" for publication in the Bulletin of the German Institute for Youth and Society.
5. On January 5, 2004, the CBC Radio aired an interview with Mr. Kempling, conducted December 29, 2003, concerned an advertisement that he had previously published offering sexual "orientation change therapy."
6. To the knowledge of Mr. Kempling, the Christian Heritage Party posted on its website an article dated February 2004, entitled "Chris Kempling: Our Canary in the Coal Mine", describing homosexuality as immoral and abnormal, and calling for support for Mr. Kempling.
7. Mr. Kempling wrote a letter to the Quesnel newspaper published on January 12, 2005. In this letter, Mr. Kempling:
  - associated homosexuality with immorality;
  - stated that he was the local representative of the Christian Heritage Party.
8. Mr. Kempling wrote a letter to the Quesnel newspaper published February 2, 2005 linking homosexuality with pedophilia.
9. Mr. Kempling made a statement to a Quesnel newspaper reporter, published April 14, 2005 by the Prince George Free Press in support of his earlier statements against homosexuality.

In a published rebuttal, Kempling argued that participation in interviews was not illegal; that his statements were biblically based, Charter-protected religious beliefs; that some citations referred to the actions of others; and that running for a political party is also Charter-protected right. In June 2008, Kempling announced that he was leaving the public school system to work for a private school, allowing him to relinquish his BCCT certification.

== Activism ==
Since his initial suspension in 2002, Kempling has spoken publicly about his conflict with the BCCT and Quesnel School District and raised funds for his legal challenges through organizations such as Equipping Christians for the Public-square Centre and British Columbia Parents and Teachers for Life. In 2003, Kempling appeared as a keynote speaker at NARTH's annual conference in Salt Lake City.

In June, 2005, the Bill C-38 parliamentary committee invited Kempling to testify as an official witness.

In a January, 2006 press release issued after leave to appeal his case to the Supreme Court of Canada was denied, Kempling stated:

It is my intention to keep on fighting by filing a formal complaint with the United Nations Commission on Human Rights. While that won't affect today's court decision, it may embarrass Canada into reviewing its alleged commitment to free speech rights for religious minorities."

Chris Kempling's activism has been recognized by a number of social conservative groups. The Canadian Alliance for Social Justice and Family Values Association twice named him their Citizen of the Year (2002 and 2008). The British Columbia Parents and Teachers for Life granted him a lifetime membership for his public service. The U.S. branch of Focus on the Family invited him to address a gathering of ambassadors at the United Nations in New York City to speak about his situation (March 4, 2005). Dr. Kempling is currently retired and no longer taking an active role in this area of controversy.

== See also ==
- Homosexuality and Christianity
- Censorship in Canada
