= Canadian Teachers' Federation =

Association of teachers' unions

- Fédération canadienne des enseignantes et des enseignants
- Abbreviation: CTF
- Founded: 1920; 106 years ago
- Headquarters: Ottawa, Ontario, Canada
- Location: Canada
- Members: 277,000 (2020)
- President: Heidi Yetman
- Executive director: Cassandra Hallett
- Affiliations: Education International
- Website: ctf-fce.ca

The Canadian Teachers' Federation (CTF; French: Fédération canadienne des enseignantes et des enseignants [FCE]) is a bilingual not-for-profit organization and a national alliance of provincial and territorial teacher organizations representing more than 365,000 elementary and secondary school teachers throughout Canada. The CTF is affiliated with Education International.

== History ==
Harry Charlesworth was the first president of the CTF, serving from 1920 to 1922.

== Public activity ==
The CTF advocates for various social justice and equity topics.

In July 2018, at a two-day Canadian Forum on Public Education in Edmonton, the CTF director of research and professional learning spoke about the increase in classroom violence.

In 2014, the CTF created a work–life balance survey, engaging secondary and elementary teachers on issues of stress and imbalance, as well as possible ways to create improvements in this balance. The report brought forward several results, including the fact that many teachers felt a strong tension between work responsibilities, as well as duties and responsibilities outside of the work environment.

== Members ==
- Alberta Teachers' Association
- Association des enseignantes et des enseignants franco-ontariens
- British Columbia Teachers' Federation
- Elementary Teachers' Federation of Ontario
- Manitoba Teachers' Society
- New Brunswick Teachers' Association
- Newfoundland and Labrador Teachers' Association
- Northwest Territories Teachers' Association
- Nova Scotia Teachers Union
- Nunavut Teachers' Association
- Ontario English Catholic Teachers' Association
- Ontario Secondary School Teachers' Federation
- Prince Edward Island Teachers' Federation
- Quebec Provincial Association of Teachers
- Saskatchewan Teachers' Federation
- Yukon Association of Education Professionals

=== Associate members ===
- New Brunswick Teachers' Federation
- Ontario Teachers' Federation
- Syndicat des enseignantes et enseignants du programme francophone de la Colombie-Britannique (local 93 of the British Columbia Teachers' Federation)
