= Manitoba Teachers' Society =

Canadian trade union

- Abbreviation: MTS
- Formation: 1919; 107 years ago
- Type: Trade union
- Headquarters: Winnipeg, Manitoba, Canada
- Location: Manitoba, Canada
- Members: 16,000
- President: Lillian Klausen
- Affiliations: Canadian Teachers' Federation; Manitoba Federation of Labour; National Association of Teachers
- Website: mbteach.org
- Formerly called: Manitoba Teachers' Federation

The Manitoba Teachers' Society (MTS) is the trade union representing schoolteachers in Manitoba, Canada. It was founded in 1919, and currently has around 16,000 members. It is an affiliate of the Canadian Teachers' Federation. Originally called the Manitoba Teachers' Federation, the union adopted its current name in 1942.
