= Putting Students First Act =

Ontario, Canada statute

Legislative Assembly of Ontario
- Long title: An Act to implement restraint measures in the education sector
- Citation: S.O. 2012, c. 11
- Assented to: September 11, 2012

Legislative history
- Introduced by: Laurel Broten MPP, Minister of Education
- First reading: August 27, 2012
- Second reading: September 5, 2012
- Third reading: September 11, 2012
- Status: Current legislation

The Putting Students First Act, 2012 (French: Loi de 2012 donnant la priorité aux élèves, also known by its former name, Bill 115) (the Act) is an act passed by the Legislative Assembly of Ontario. The law allows the provincial government to set rules that local school boards must adhere to when negotiating with local unions and to impose a collective agreement on the board, employee bargaining agent, and the employees of the board represented by the employee bargaining agent if negotiations are not completed by December 31, 2012. This bill also limits the legality of teachers' unions and support staff going on strike. In April 2016, the law was found to be unconstitutional.

Bill 115 was given its first reading in the Legislative Assembly of Ontario on August 28, 2012, and received Royal Assent on September 11, 2012. The bill was supported by the Ontario Liberal Party and the Progressive Conservative Party of Ontario and opposed by members of the NDP. The result of the vote was 82–15 in favour of the bill. The act took effect immediately after approval and school boards, teachers, and support staff continued to engage in collective bargaining until December 31, 2012.

Collective bargaining is ongoing in an attempt to have the government's education partners reach agreements that respect local circumstances while remaining within limitations established in the legislation. The Putting Students First Act was intended to ensure that school contracts fit the government's financial and policy priorities, and aims to prevent labour disruptions during 2013 and 2014. It was claimed that the law would save the province of Ontario CA$2 billion and would prevent spending CA$473 million, a reduction the government claimed to be crucial. The Minister of Education has the power to withhold approval of collective labour contracts and the parties involved will risk having an agreement imposed if a proposed deal does not meet the standards of the legislation.

== Background ==
Collective bargaining was ongoing in an attempt to have the government's education partners reach agreements that respected local circumstances while remaining within limitations established in the legislation. Bill 115 was intended to ensure that school contracts fit the government's financial and policy priorities and aimed to prevent labour disruptions during 2013 and 2014. The Act purportedly saved the province of Ontario CA$2 billion and will have prevented the spending of $473 million, a reduction in spending the government said to be crucial. The Minister of Education was given the power to withhold approval of collective labour contracts and the parties involved risked having an agreement imposed if a proposed deal did not meet the standards of the legislation.

== Enforcement and repeal ==
When tabled in the legislature, section 22 of Bill 115 stated that "This Act comes into force on a day to be named by proclamation of the Lieutenant Governor", while section 20 said "This Act is repealed". Royal Assent was granted to the bill by Lieutenant Governor of Ontario David Onley on September 11, 2012, and, at the direction of the Executive Council and despite the wording of section 22, the date of the enforcement of only sections 1 to 19 and 21 was proclaimed on the following day. Another proclamation was issued by Order in Council on January 21, 2013, bringing section 20 of the act into force.

== Terms and conditions of contracts of the Act ==
- The Ontario Labour Relations Board is prohibited from inquiring into whether the Act is constitutionally valid, or if it is in conflict with the Ontario Human Rights Code.
- No arbitrator or arbitration board is permitted to inquire into whether the Act is constitutionally valid, or if it is in conflict with the Ontario Human Rights Code.
- No terms or conditions included in a collective agreement under this act may be questioned or reviewed in any court.
- All teachers are subject to a two-year pay freeze.
- A restructured short-term sick leave plan that would include up to 10 sick days.
- No salary increases in the 2012-2014 school years.
- All teachers will receive a 1.5% pay cut in the form of three unpaid professional development days (PD days)
- This bill also limits the legality of teachers' unions and support staff going on strike.

== Opposition ==
Many union leaders believe that Bill 115 is a threat to unionized employees as well as democratic rights and values, due to its power to limit strike action and impose a collective agreement without negotiation. Some union members are concerned that future legislative acts could further restrict teachers' bargaining options. Protests took place in many places in Ontario in an attempt to bring Dalton McGuinty's attention to this Bill and try to stop it from being passed. On September 14, 2012, teachers in Ottawa, Ontario protested with signs outside of Dalton McGuinty's office. The rally was organized by the secondary school teachers' federation and had close to 800 people attend, including students who left classes to support their teachers. The Elementary Teachers' Federation of Ontario has suggested that its members take a "pause" in after-school programs. Many teachers in both elementary and secondary schools have withdrawn from supervising any after-school activities. On December 15, 2012, high school students from the York and Toronto region participated in a walkout against Bill 115. Students then travelled from their schools to Queen's Park to protest the Act. Several hundred to a few thousand students across the city were estimated to have attended.

== Canadian Union of Public Employees ==
More than 55,000 members of the Canadian Union of Public Employees (CUPE) are also affected by Bill 115. They are the support staff working for school boards in Ontario. Some custodians, maintenance staff, secretaries, educational assistants, early childhood educators, and library technicians are campaigning against Bill 115. Union members are meeting across the province of Ontario to discuss this issue. CUPE has also initiated legal action to contest the validity of Bill 115.

== Strike action ==
On December 10, 2012, elementary school teachers from the Avon Maitland District School Board and the District School Board Ontario North East begins the one-day, rotating strikes in Ontario elementary schools. It continued until Christmas break.

The union representing elementary school teachers from across the province planned a walkout for January 11, 2013. The strike would affect over 900,000 students. Ontario Premier Dalton McGuinty called it an illegal strike. Sam Hammond, president of the Elementary Teachers' Federation of Ontario, called it a one-day protest. Progressive Conservative education critic Lisa MacLeod "blasted" the Liberals for being "so vague" in their response. The New Democratic Party stated that they believe the teacher unions actions are legal and blamed the government for creating "chaos in schools". The union representing Ontario high school teachers announced that they have planned a walkout for January 16, 2013. The provincial government went to the Ontario Labour Relations Board on January 10, 2013, at 3 PM to try to stop the planned walkout action by Ontario's elementary and high school teachers. The Ontario Labour Relations Board ruled that the walkout was an illegal strike on January 11, 2013, at 4 AM. The elementary and high school teachers' union called off the strike after the decision. The Toronto District School Board and Halton District School Board were originally closing all elementary schools regardless of the labour relations board's decision. However, management from the two school boards changed their minds and opened elementary schools. Elementary schools in the Greater Essex County District School Board were closed. Disobeying the order would have placed the union and teachers in contempt of court and fines of up to $25,000 for the unions and up to $2,000 for individual teachers.

== Court ruling ==
On April 20, 2016, the Ontario Superior Court of Justice found, "that between the fall of 2011 and the passage of the Putting Students First Act, Ontario infringed on the applicants' right, under the Charter of Rights and Freedoms, to meaningful collective bargaining." Judge Lederer ruled, " When reviewed in the context of the Charter and the rights it provides, it becomes apparent that the process engaged in was fundamentally flawed. It could not, by its design, provide meaningful collective bargaining. Ontario, on its own, devised a process. It set the parameters which would allow it to meet fiscal restraints it determined and then set a program which limited the ability of the others parties to take part in a meaningful way."

== Chronology of events ==
Date	Event	Source
July 5, 2012	Ontario Catholic teachers reach deal with the provincial government. However, separate school boards are refusing "to sign on over fears management has given up too much power over hiring."	
August 7, 2012	Toronto Catholic District School Board become the first Catholic school board to accept a deal.	
August 28, 2012	First reading in the Legislative Assembly of Ontario.	
September 11, 2012	Royal Assent given.	
September 12, 2012	Sections 1 to 19 and 21 are brought into force by royal proclamation	
December 3, 2012	The Ontario Secondary School Teachers' Federation (OSSTF) announced that high school teachers won't lead any extracurricular activities. The OSSTF also stated that high school teachers will report only 15 minutes before the start of the school day and leave immediately after classes.	
December 10, 2012	Elementary school teachers from the Avon Maitland District School Board and the District School Board Ontario North East begins the one-day, rotating strikes in Ontario elementary schools.	
December 11, 2012	Elementary school teachers from the District School Board of Niagara and the Keewatin-Patricia District School Board go on a one-day strike. High school students from KPDSB's Dryden High School also participated in a walk-out to show support for their teachers.	
December 13, 2012	Elementary school teachers from the York Region District School Board. High school students held a mass protest rally at Queen's Park.	
December 14, 2012	Elementary school teachers from the Toronto District School Board and Peel District School Board went on a one-day strike.	
December 20, 2012	The Canadian Union of Public Employees (CUPE), who represent support staff, threaten to have one-day strikes.	
December 30, 2012	The provincial government and CUPE reached a tentative deal.	
December 31, 2012	Deadline for school boards, teachers, and support staff to finalize a collective bargaining agreement.	
January 3, 2013	Minister of Education Laurel Broten announced that she has imposed contracts on teachers and will be repealing Bill 115.	
January 9, 2013	The Union representing Ontario public elementary teachers announced that they planned one-day, province wide walkout for January 11, 2013. The Union representing Ontario public high school teachers announced that they planned a one-day, province wide walkout on January 16, 2013.	
January 10, 2013	The provincial government went to the Ontario Labour Relations Board to stop the planned walkout by Ontario's public elementary and high school teachers.	
January 11, 2013	The Ontario Labour Relations Board ruled that the walkout is an illegal strike. The Elementary Teachers' Federation of Ontario and the Ontario Secondary School Teachers' Federation called off their one-day strikes. Elementary schools in the Greater Essex County District School Board were closed.	
January 21, 2013	Section 20 is brought into force by royal proclamation	
April 20, 2016	The Ontario Superior Court of Justice found, "that between the fall of 2011 and the passage of the Putting Students First Act, Ontario infringed on the applicants' right, under the Charter of Rights and Freedoms, to meaningful collective bargaining."	

== See also ==
- Elementary Teachers' Federation of Ontario
- Ontario Secondary School Teachers' Federation
- Education in Ontario
