= 1997 Brazilian police strike =

- Location: Brazil
- Methods: Strike action

The 1997 Brazilian police strike was a series of strikes by police officers in Brazil over wages.

== History ==
The strike was sparked by complaints about low wages, with Brazilian police demanding to pay raises of 85%. Strike actions were taken by police in at least 15 different Brazilian states.

In some regions, the Brazilian military was deployed to take over policing functions during the strike. In the city of Belo Horizonte, when a demonstration by the striking police officers marched on the Governor's residence, one police officer was killed in the ensuing clashes.

== Reactions ==
Pernambuco Minister of Justice Roberto França stated that "there has been nothing like this here in decades," saying that "this kind of lawlessness is unprecedented here."

The United States Department of State's 1997 Country Reports on Human Rights Practices stated that "the need for police reform was brought to the forefront by widely publicized incidents of police involvement in criminal activity and police strikes in at least 15 states, which drew attention to their low pay and inadequate training."

== See also ==
- 1997 in Brazil
- Timeline of strikes in 1997
- 2017 Military Police of Espírito Santo strike
