= Elementary Teachers' Federation of Ontario =

Canadian trade union

- Abbreviation: ETFO
- Formation: 1998; 28 years ago
- Merger of: Federation of Women Teachers' Associations of Ontario; Ontario Public School Teachers' Federation
- Type: Trade union
- Headquarters: Toronto, Ontario, Canada
- Location: Ontario, Canada
- Members: 84,000
- President: David Mastin
- General secretary: Sharon O'Halloran
- Affiliations: Canadian Labour Congress; Canadian Teachers' Federation; Ontario Federation of Labour; Ontario Teachers' Federation
- Website: etfo.ca

The Elementary Teachers' Federation of Ontario (ETFO; French: Fédération des enseignants et des enseignantes de l'élémentaire de l'Ontario, FEÉO) is a labour union representing all public elementary school teachers, occasional teachers, and some designated early childhood educators (DECEs) in the Canadian province of Ontario. The union has 76 local chapters in the province, and over 84,000 members. The union was founded on July 1, 1998, by the merger of the Federation of Women Teachers' Associations of Ontario (FWTAO) and the Ontario Public School Teachers' Federation (OPSTF).

ETFO's 84,000 members join the Association des enseignantes et des enseignants franco-ontariens (representing approximately 8,000 members), the Ontario English Catholic Teachers' Association (representing approximately 45,000 members) and the Ontario Secondary School Teachers' Federation (representing approximately 60,000 members) to form the Ontario Teachers' Federation. ETFO is also a member of the Canadian Teachers' Federation.

== Governance ==
The governance framework is outlined in a number of different documents including the Bylaws, Constitution, Human Rights Statement, Policy Statements, Position Statements, and Equity Statement. These documents form the framework for how ETFO is governed and what it sets out to accomplish for its members.

=== Provincial Presidents ===
Term	Name	Local
2025-present	David Mastin	Durham Teacher Local
2021–2025	Karen Brown	Elementary Teachers of Toronto Local
2009–2021	Sam Hammond	Hamilton-Wentworth Teacher Local
2007 - 2009	David Clegg	York Region Teacher Local
2002 - 2007	Emily Noble	Algoma Teacher Local
1998 - 2002	Phyllis J. Lennox (née Benedict)	Kawartha Pine Ridge Teacher Local

=== Provincial Executive ===
ETFO's provincial organization includes four fully released officers: President, First Vice-President, Vice-President Female and Vice-President. All four of these officers are ETFO members (teachers, occasional teachers, DECEs or other educational professionals) that have been released from their teaching duties for their term in office.

In addition to the 4 released officers, ETFO's provincial governing body includes one representative to the Ontario Teachers' Federation (OTF Table Officer), and as many additional officers required to make up the 14-member Executive. Of those remaining positions, 4 of them are open to women only.

All Provincial Executive positions are elected by the general membership at ETFO's Annual Meeting held each summer in August. All terms last 2 years.

A current list of elected members of the ETFO executive is available etfo.ca.

=== ETFO locals ===
Each school board in Ontario has at least 1 ETFO Local serving members who work within that school board. Teacher Locals are present in all school boards. 1 board (James Bay) has only a Teacher Local, 10 boards have DECE (Dedicated Early Childhood Educator) Locals, 2 boards have ESP and one of those 2 (Renfrew County) also has a PSP Local.

The objectives and priorities of ETFO are contained in the constitution:

While all boards now have DECEs as a result of the implementation of Full Day Kindergarten for children aged 4 – 6, not all of those educators are represented by ETFO.

Region	Teacher Local	OT Local	DECE Local	ESP and PSP Local
Algoma	Teacher	OT		
Avon Maitland	Teacher	OT		
Bluewater	Teacher	OT		
Durham	Teacher	OT	DECE and Catholic DECE	
Grand Erie	Teacher	OT	DECE	
Greater Essex County	Teacher	OT		
Halton	Teacher	OT	DECE	
Hamilton-Wentworth	Teacher	OT	DECE	
Hastings-Prince Edward	Teacher	OT		
James Bay	Teacher			
Kawartha Pine Ridge	Teacher	OT		
Keewatin-Patricia	Teacher	OT		
Lakehead	Teacher	OT		
Lambton Kent	Teacher	OT		
Limestone	Teacher	OT		
Near North	Teacher	OT		
Niagara	Teacher	OT		
Ontario North East	Teacher	OT		
Ottawa-Carleton	Teacher	OT		
Peel	Teacher	OT		
Rainbow	Teacher	OT	DECE	
Rainy River District	Teacher	OT		ESP
Renfrew County	Teacher	OT		ESP and PSP
Simcoe County	Teacher	OT	DECE	
Superior Greenstone	Teacher	OT		
Thames Valley	Teacher	OT		
Toronto	Teacher	OT	Catholic DECE	
Trillium Lakelands	Teacher	OT	DECE	
Upper Canada	Teacher	OT		
Upper Grand	Teacher	OT		
Waterloo Region	Teacher	OT	DECE	
York Region	Teacher	OT		

== Advocacy and equity ==
ETFO has undertaken initiatives addressing equity issues in education. With 80%+ female members, ETFO is particularly active in its support for women's participation and leadership.

The ETFO Executive has adopted this definition of equity:

ETFO recognizes that we live in a society characterized by individual and systemic discrimination against particular groups. Within this context, ETFO defines equity as fairness achieved through proactive measures which result in equality for all.

== See also ==
- Education in Ontario
