= Federation of Women Teachers' Associations of Ontario =

- Abbreviation: FWTAO
- Merged into: Elementary Teachers' Federation of Ontario
- Formation: 1918
- Dissolved: 1998
- Type: Trade union; professional association
- Location: Ontario, Canada

The Federation of Women Teachers' Associations of Ontario (FWTAO) was an association founded in 1918 to promote the interests of female elementary school teachers in Ontario, and continued to represent female teachers until merging in 1998 with the Ontario Public School Teachers' Federation to form the Elementary Teachers' Federation of Ontario.

== History ==
The FWTAO was formed as a coalition of local women teachers' associations which had begun forming in 1888 in several Ontario cities. They worked for better salaries and job security. In the early years, according to a history by Barbara Richter in the newsletter of the successor organization, FWTAO organizers risked dismissal from their jobs. With the passage of the Teaching Profession Act of 1944, all female elementary school teachers in the public school system in Ontario were required to be members of the FWTAO. This empowered the FWTAO to carry out its work. The FWTAO worked to counter discrimination against women; for example, even after the passage of legislation in 1951 requiring equal pay for work of equal value, married male teachers were still receiving an additional allowance. There were strict social expectations of female teachers; a 1965 study found that female teachers were expected by parents not to smoke, place bets, run for political office, teach after marriage or any of a number of other activities; there were strict expectations that they stop work if visibly pregnant. The FWTAO worked to change these expectations.

The FWTAO lobbied for affirmative action programs and used scholarships to help individual women further their careers; they also gave scholarships to young women in developing countries. They developed curricula, which tended to follow a democratic philosophy of education, promoting cooperation rather than competition.

The Ontario Public School Teachers' Federation, formerly the Ontario Public School Men Teachers Federation, made repeated attempts since the late 1960s to merge with the FWTAO, including three court challenges. In 1994, the Ontario Human Rights Commission upheld a complaint by a female principal that the requirement that she be a member of FWTAO was discrimination. A decision was made in 1996 to merge the organizations, and in 1998 they did so, forming the Elementary Teachers' Federation of Ontario.

The FWTAO donated its records to the Clara Thomas Archives & Special Collections at York University Libraries.
