= Theresa Phondo =

Malawian gospel and Afro-R&B singer, and songwriter

- Born: Malawi
- Origin: Lilongwe, Malawi
- Genres: Gospel, Afro-R&B, Christian music
- Occupations: Singer, songwriter, worship leader
- Years active: 2022–present
- Labels: Hills Capital, ONErpm

Theresa Phondo is a Malawian gospel and Afro-R&B musician and worship leader. In 2024, she won a female of the year title in Maso Music awards. In March 2024, her song titled "Blessings" was the most streamed Malawian gospel song on Spotify.

== Early life and career ==
Phondo was born in Northern Malawi. She is a Tumbuka by tribe. She was a member of the youth collective Zathu Band in Malawi before launching her solo career. Her breakthrough single "Blessings" was released in 2022 and featured Sal LY and Noël Mio.

== Music and releases ==
Her discography includes the singles "Blessings", "Testimony", "Yewo" and "Daily". She issued a self-titled extended play in 2024 through ONErpm distribution. In 2025, she released a remix of "Daily" titled "Daily II", collaborating with Zambian artists Esther Chungu and Tio Nason.

== Achievements ==
“Blessings" became one of the most streamed gospel songs from Malawi, passing one million plays on Spotify and attracting international attention. She was nominated for Best Female Artist of the Year at the Maso Awards in 2024 and later won the Female Artist of the Year award at the 2025 ceremony.

== Tours and performances ==
On 19 April 2025 Phondo performed her first solo concert in Blantyre at "The Easter Experience" and has appeared at events including the 2024 UMP Festival.

== Personal life ==
Outside music Phondo serves as Administrative Assistant to the Chief Strategy Advisor to the President of Malawi.

== Discography ==
Her self-titled EP Theresa Phondo was released in 2024. Notable singles include “Blessings” (2022), “Testimony” (2024), “Yewo” (2024) and “Daily” with the 2025 remix “Daily II”.

== Awards and nominations ==
Year	Award event	Category	Result
2024	Maso Awards	Best Female Artist of the Year	Nominated
2025	Maso Awards	Female Artist of the Year	Won
