= James C. MacPherson =

James C. MacPherson is a former justice of the Court of Appeal for Ontario.

== Early life and education ==
Born in Yarmouth, Nova Scotia, he graduated from Acadia University with a Bachelor of Arts degree and then graduated from Dalhousie Law School in 1974 with a Bachelor of Laws. He then went on to receive a Masters in Law and Diploma in Comparative Law from Cambridge University.

== Legal career ==
He was a professor at the Faculty of Law at the University of Victoria from 1976 to 1981. In 1981, he became Director of the Constitutional Law Branch of the Department of Attorney General of Saskatchewan. From 1985 to 1988, he was Executive Legal Officer to the Supreme Court of Canada. In 1988, he was appointed Dean of Osgoode Hall Law School. In 1993, he was appointed a Justice of the Ontario Court of Justice (General Division). In 1999, he was appointed to the Court of Appeal for Ontario. He retired in 2025.
