= Nova Scotia Teachers Union =

Canadian trade union

- Abbreviation: NSTU
- Formation: 1895; 131 years ago
- Type: Trade union
- Headquarters: Halifax, Nova Scotia, Canada
- Location: Nova Scotia, Canada
- Members: 10,000
- President: Ryan Lutes
- Executive director: Steve Brooks
- Affiliations: Canadian Teachers' Federation
- Website: nstu.ca

The Nova Scotia Teachers Union was organized in 1895–96 to unify and elevate the teaching profession in the Canadian province of Nova Scotia. As the unified voice for the advocacy and support of all its members, the NSTU promotes and advances the teaching profession and quality public education. Members include some 9,100 public school teachers including specialist teachers, speech language pathologists and school psychologists. It also represents teachers who work for the Atlantic Provinces Special Education Authority in Nova Scotia, Prince Edward Island and New Brunswick.

The NSTU serves as the primary advocate of its members by protecting and enhancing economic benefits, improving working conditions, supporting personal well being, keeping members informed and promoting opportunities to participate.

During a dispute with the Nova Scotia government in 2016/17, they negotiated three contracts that they supported, however the membership rejected all three. The Nova Scotia Government has put forward a bill to legislate the teacher's new contract.

== 2016/2017 Strike ==
In July 2015, the contract between the NSTU and the Province of Nova Scotia expired. The first tentative deal was put forward by the Province (headed by at the time by Liberal Party Premier Stephen McNeil) in December of that year, with 61% of the vote voting against the deal. At the time, working conditions of teachers were said to be a major factor in the decision, with then Union President Shelley Morse quoted as saying “You know about the situation in some of the schools, in Halifax they’re in disrepair, teachers don’t have proper resources, their classrooms some of them are bulging, we have upwards of 40 students in a class... So they wanted to see those issues addressed.”. A tentative agreement was reached in September of that year, with then Union President Lisa Doucet voting in favour, but was rejected by the Union in October. A strike mandate vote was also held at the same time as the second rejection, and was passed by 96% majority.

In late November 2016, the NSTU and the province resumed talks, this time accompanied by a conciliator (the NSTU had also requested a mediator, though this was denied by the Nova Scotia Department of Labour). Despite this, these talks also proved fruitless. Until this point, the day-to-day operations of schools in the province had been unaffected. On November 22, 2016, the province sent a letter to parents of children attending Nova Scotia public schools warning them of a potential of a strike.

On December 5, 2016, teachers in Nova Scotia began work-to-rule. Originally, teachers were to arrive at school twenty minutes before the school day started, left 20 minutes after it ended, and not supervise students on lunch breaks, which led the province to close schools, citing safety concerns. Slight adjustments were then made, allowing schools to reopen the next day, though work-to-rule remained in place, meaning, for example, extracurricular activities, such as Christmas concerts, sports, and clubs remained cancelled. Work-to-rule was temporarily lifted in late January 2017, but was back in place by the month's end. In response, local universities began to wave entrance requirements for letters of reference.

Talks continued between the province and the NSTU, but no agreement was reached. In mid-February 2017, the province introduced Bill 75, which would have forced a contract onto teachers. In response, the NSTU held a one-day strike on Friday, 17, February 2017. This was the first strike in the NSTU's then 122-year history.

This strike did not prevent the passing of Bill 75, technically bringing an end to the contract negotiation that had begun in 2015. However, the NSTU continued to be unhappy with the bill, and in May 2017 announced its intent to file a charter challenge with Nova Scotia's attorney general.

Another result of the strike was the filing of a lawsuit by several Nova Scotia universities (Acadia, Cape Breton, Mount Saint Vincent, St. Francis Xavier and Sainte-Anne) with the Supreme Court of Nova Scotia over the interruption of student-teacher practicums during work-to-rule.

== Presidents ==
- Robert MacLellan of Pictou Academy, 1895-Unknown. Inaugural President
- David Soloan, 1903-Unknown
- Tom Parker, During or before 1949-1954, then became first Executive Secretary (Director)
- Karen Willis Duerden, 1990s
- John MacDonald, Unknown, was President in 1994
- Liette Doucet, 2016-2018
- Paul Wozney, 2018-2022
- Ryan Lutes, 2022–Present
