= Ontario English Catholic Teachers' Association =

Canadian trade union

- Abbreviation: OECTA
- Formation: 1944; 82 years ago
- Type: Trade union
- Headquarters: Toronto, Ontario, Canada
- Location: Ontario, Canada
- Members: 45,000
- Official language: English
- President: René Jansen in de Wal
- General secretary: David Church
- Affiliations: Canadian Labour Congress; Canadian Teachers' Federation; Institute for Catholic Education; Ontario Federation of Labour; Ontario Teachers' Federation
- Website: catholicteachers.ca

The Ontario English Catholic Teachers' Association (OECTA) is a trade union that represents teachers in publicly funded Roman Catholic schools in the Canadian province of Ontario. It is affiliated with the Ontario Teachers' Federation, the Canadian Teachers' Federation, the Canadian Labour Congress, and the Ontario Federation of Labour.

OECTA has more than 45,000 members as of 2022. Its mandate includes both the support of its members through the promotion of Catholic values, advocacy, collective bargaining, professional development and protection, and advocacy for the common good.

== Presidents ==
Name	Took office	Left office
Margaret Lynch	1944	1945
Very Reverend B.W. Harrigan	1945	1947
Raymond J. Bergin	1947	1948
Reverend Brother Thaddeus	1948	1949
Dorthea McDonell	1949	1950
Patrick Perdue	1950	1951
Mother Mary Lenore	1951	1953
Margaret Drago	1953	1955
Reverend C.L. Siegried	1955	1956
Mary W. Flynn	1956	1958
Sister M. Vincentia	1958	1960
Reverend J.H. Conway	1960	1962
Patrick O'Leary	1962	1963
Veronica Houlahan	1963	1964
Sister Frances McCann	1964	1965
Karl Bohren	1965	1966
Sister M. Aloysia	1966	1967
Ruth Willis	1967	1968
John Rodriguez	1968	1969
John Kuchinak	1969	1970
Marie Kennedy	1970	1971
Reverend J. Frank Kavanagh	1971	1972
James Carey	1972	1973
Robert Cooney	1973	1974
Léo Normandeau	1974	1975
Derry Byrne	1975	1977
Peter Gazzola	1977	1978
Doreen Brady	1978	1980
George Saranchuk	1980	1982
Kevin Kennedy	1982	1984
T. John Fauteux	1984	1986
Jim Cooney	1986	1988
Eileen Lennon	1988	1990
Michael Côté	1990	1992
Helen Biales	1992	1993
Clare Ross	1993	1995
Marilies Rettig	1995	1997
Marshall Jarvis	1997	1999
Jim Smith	1999	2001
Kathy McVean	2001	2003
Donna Marie Kennedy	2003	2007
Elaine MacNeil	2007	2008
James Ryan	2009	2011
Kevin O'Dwyer	2011	2013
James Ryan	2013	2015
Ann Hawkins	2015	2017
Liz Stuart	2017	2021
Barb Dobrowolski	2021	2023
René Jansen in de Wal	2023	

== See also ==
- Association des enseignantes et des enseignants franco-ontariens
- Education in Ontario
- Elementary Teachers' Federation of Ontario
- Ontario Secondary School Teachers' Federation
