= Chatsika Report =

The Chatsika Report published in 1995, whose full title was “Report of the Commission of Inquiry into Conditions of Service of Civil Servants”, was the report of a commission of inquiry headed by a senior judge into the pay, conditions of service, recruitment and training of Civil Servants in Malawi. Despite two earlier inquiries, their conditions of service were basically those that had been established for the colonial civil service before independence. After the ending of autocratic rule by Dr. Banda, the main aid donors insisted on civil service modernisation and reform in line with Free market concepts promoted by the International Monetary Fund at that time. In the event, the report advocated substantial pay increases to attract suitable recruits, but these proposals were never fully implemented. Civil service reform in Malawi has been proposed several times since its independence but has generally failed because of the country’s lack of sufficient well-trained managers willing to enter the civil service.

== Background ==
In 1891, the whole of what is now Malawi became a British protectorate, later called Nyasaland. Over the next sixty years its administration consisted of a small number of senior European civil servants appointed by the Colonial Office or Crown Agents on expatriate contracts, and a larger number of junior African civil servants engaged on local contracts by the Nyasaland Government. Nyasaland joined Northern and Southern Rhodesia in the Federation of Rhodesia and Nyasaland. This introduced a third group of civil servants, those working for departments of the Federal government, who were employed from within the Federation and did not have expatriate status: they included both Europeans and Africans.

=== Skinner Report ===
During the period of Federation, a number of Nyasaland Africans became Federal civil servants and reached middle-ranking and senior positions, but received lower salaries and fewer benefits than colleagues on expatriate contracts. Once the Federation was dissolved and the country progressed towards full independence as Malawi, its new African majority government commissioned a Local Civil Service Commission of Inquiry in 1963, whose report, the Skinner Report, aimed to bring order to the different pay rates for local civil servants, including the integration of former Federal civil servants. The Skinner report recommended raising the salaries of the lower-paid civil servants but enrolling them in a compulsory pension scheme, and reducing the salaries of the highest paid while leaving mid-level salaries unchanged. Other cost-saving measures included eliminating or reducing a number of allowances for middle and higher-level officers and increasing charges for their government housing.

Although members of the Malawi Congress Party agitated for the wholesale replacement of expatriate civil servants by Malawians, Prime Minister Banda insisted on their retention until suitably-qualified Malawians were available. British-recruited expatriate officers were generally cushioned against the effects of reductions in their salaries or allowances through payments by the British Government. Some more contentious aspects of the Skinner reforms were modified in 1965, but they remained the basis of civil service pay and allowances until in 1983, despite a large increase in staff numbers. The Malawi Government requested British Government Assistance in forming an Independent Civil Service Review Commission in that year.

=== Herbecq Report ===
This commission was to examine the structure, staffing and training of the Malawi Civil Service, and suggest improvements. It chairman was Sir John Herbecq, a retired senior British civil servant, and the commission reported in 1985, identifying some weaknesses and recommending solutions. However, although the Malawi Government accepted this report, it took little action on it. The Herbecq Report highlighted poor civil service performance arising from the inadequate definition of responsibilities, poor training, ineffective evaluation of projects and poor financial management. It also concluded pay levels were too low to attract the best professional and technical candidates, but noted overstaffing and excessive staff turnover at lower levels.

By 1992, the real value of civil service salaries was only half their 1982 levels, although this fall was partly offset by non-cash benefits such as subsidised housing. Following the 1993 referendum that ended the autocratic rule of Dr. Banda, free elections in 1994, civil service strikes and two critical World Bank reports relating to the use of Structural adjustment loans that criticised the management of the Malawi Civil Service and its pay levels, and which recommended reducing the number of junior officers and support staff, the incoming government of Bakili Muluzi was forced to take action, by an immediate increase to junior officers’ salaries and by agreeing to an independent inquiry.

== The Chatsika Commission ==
Muluzi appointed Justice Lewis Chatsika, who had first been appointed a judge of Malawi’s High Court in 1970 and of its Supreme Court in 1990, where he was noted for his courageous independence of the Banda regime. The commission he headed (Chatsika Commission) delivered its report in March 1995. It recommended substantial salary increases: 263 percent for the lowest grades, 120 percent for middle grades and 236 percent for the most senior civil servants. It recognised that implementing these proposal would result in a doubling of the civil service salary bill, but was convinced this was necessary, despite the likely objections of the World Bank and the International Monetary Fund (IMF).

Although the World Bank and the IMF accepted that the value of civil service pay had declined sharply in the decade up to 1995, they put pressure on president Muluzi not to implement the Chatsika Commission in full or immediately, but to promise to increase the salaries of all grades by 25 percent when circumstances allowed.

== Aftermath ==
In April 1997, civil servants demanded implementation of the commission’s recommendations and many went on strike, although this strike soon collapsed. Instead of meeting these demands, the government began increasing all salaries by 25 percent each year, although this did little more than countering inflation. In addition, the government set up a Public Service Change Management Agency in 1997 to supervise the reduction of the size of the Malawi Civil Service and related public services from around 30,000 employees to 16,000 by 2000. This was accomplished but caused widespread unrest among junior civil service ranks and many spontaneous if localised strikes.

The failure of recent attempts at civil service reform in Malawi has been attributed to the insistence of aid donors such the World Bank and the IMF on forcing the adoption a single solution, without recognising local conditions. The donors’ template for reform involves the adoption of such private-sector concepts as creating specific performance targets and devolving authority to managers, regardless of whether sufficient appropriately trained managers exist. Attempts at reform have also led to polarisation between high-ranking civil servants, able to benefit from the reforms, and the mass of their juniors, paid low salaries, often in arrears, and lacking job security.

== Sources ==
- G. Anders, (2001). Freedom and Insecurity: Civil Servants between Support Networks, the Free Market and Civil Service Reform, in H. Englund (editor), A Democracy of Chameleons, Uppsala, Nordiska Afrikaininstitutet. ISBN 978-9-17106-499-8.
- G. Anders, (2014). Old-school Bureaucrats and Technocrats in Malawi, in T. Bierschenk and J-P. O. de Sardan (editors), States at Work: Dynamics of African Bureaucracies, Leiden, Brill. ISBN 978-9-00426-478-6.
- J. Corkery, (1998). Management of Public Service Reform: A Comparative Review of Experiences in the Management of Programmes of Reform of the Administrative Arm of Central Government. Amsterdam, IOS Press. ISBN 90-5199-421-4.
- D. Durvall and M. Erlandsson, (2005). Public Finance Management reform in Malawi. Goteborg, SIDA Country Economic Report 2005:1
- O. J. M. Kalinga (2012). Historical Dictionary of Malawi (fourth edition). Toronto, Scarecrow Press. ISBN 978-0-81085-961-6.
- J. McCraken, (2012). A History of Malawi, 1859-1966 Woodbridge, James Currey. ISBN 978-1-84701-050-6.
- J. G. Pike, (1969). Malawi: A Political and Economic History. London, Pall Mall Press.
- J Power, (2010). Political Culture and Nationalism in Malawi: Building Kwacha. University of Rochester PressISBN 978-1-58046-310-2.
- R.I.C. Tambusi, (2010). Critical Perspectives on Public Service Reforms, pp. 5, 10-11, in R.I.C. Tambusi, (editor) Reforming the Malawian Public Sector: Retrospectives and Prospectives. Dakar, Council for the Development of Social Science Research in Africa.
