= Roy Campanella Occupational Training Center =

Public school in New York City

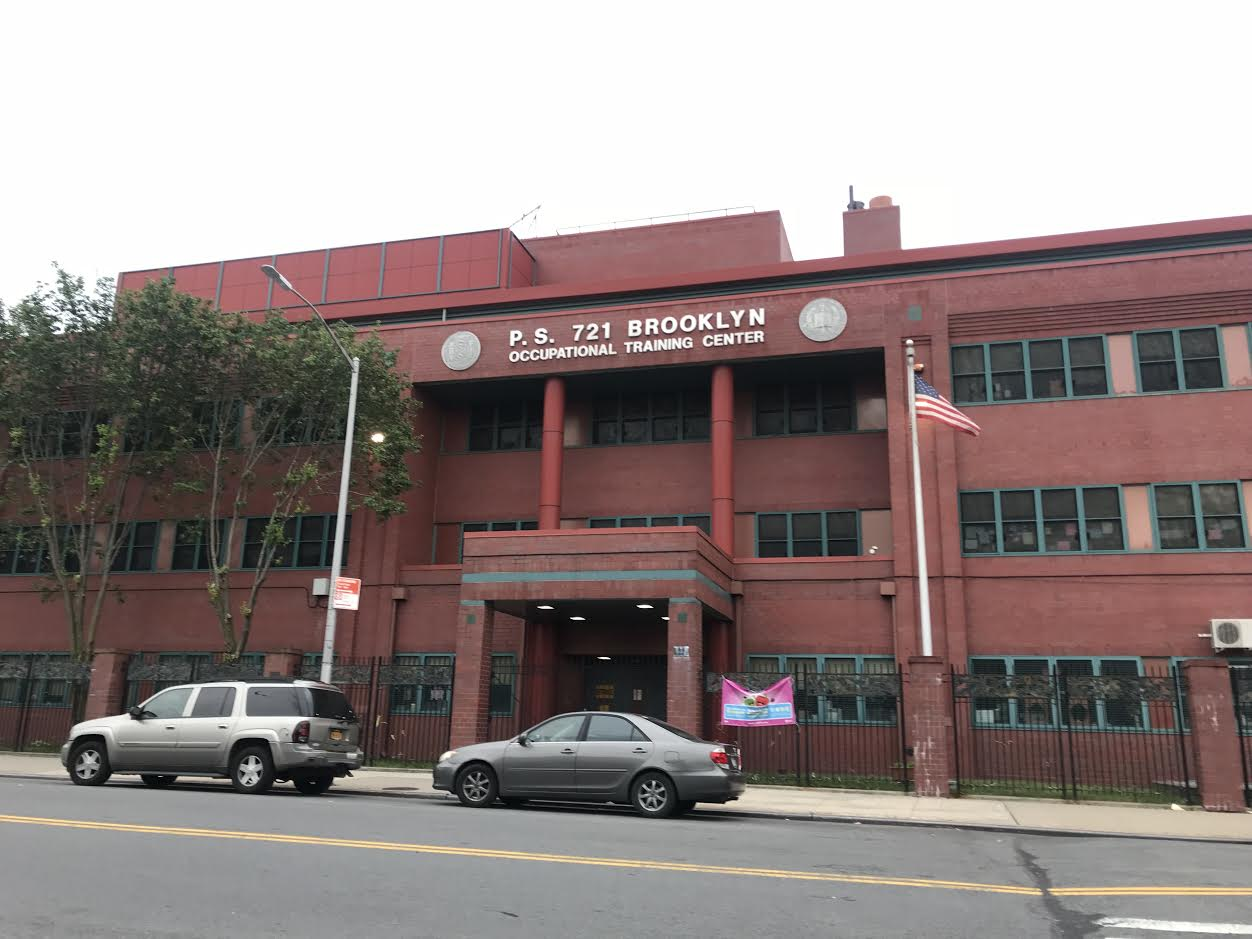

Address
- 64 Avenue X, Brooklyn, New York, 11223; United States
- Coordinates: 40.589152°N 73.981023°W

Information
- Type: Public high school
- Established: 1976 (reconstructed in 1992)
- School district: 75
- Principal: Barbara Tremblay
- Faculty: 116.0 FTEs
- Grades: kindergarten–second grade, sixth grade-12
- Enrollment: 481 (as of 2017-18)
- Website: p721k.org

Roy Campanella Occupational Training Center, also known as Brooklyn Occupational Training Center, Roy Campanella OTC or simply the Roy Campanella School is a public high school located at 64 Avenue X, in Brooklyn, New York, USA, under the jurisdiction of the New York City Department of Education. The school serves students from kindergarten to 2nd grade and 6 to 12th grade. The current principal is Barbara Tremblay.

The school can be reached by the D and F trains, as well as B1, B4, and B82 buses.

== History ==
The school was named after American baseball player Roy Campanella. The school is part of District 75, and exclusively serves students with developmental disabilities. The school does not participate in the high school admissions process.

== Programs and activities ==
=== Quad System ===
The school is divided into ten professional learning communities, called “Quads”. Each Quad participates in specific activities and learning initiatives.

- Quad 1: The Service in School's Quad provides students opportunities to participate in community-based work including food/clothing drives, and overall fundraisers to support the school and its surrounding community.
- Quad 2: The Library Quad This Quad runs the school library services and has created partnerships with PB21K and other District 75 schools through the Reading Buddies program.
- Quad 3: The Multi-Lingual Quad services all bilingual and ENL students who are implementing the Hallmarks of an Advanced Literacy classroom.
- Quad 4: The SCANA (self-control, communicating, advocating, navigating, arts) program incorporates Art Education through student advocacy, academics, and transitional skills.
- Quad 5: The Sustainability Quad runs the school garden and shares best practices for a Zero Waste school community.
- Quad 6: Students participate in the schools in-house, work-study programs and part-time community-based worksites.
- Quad 7: Z Nation students focus on adapted daily living skills and run the school's Flea Market to support various fundraising initiatives.
- Quad 8: Students are participating in full-time community-based work site students who perform vocational skills linked to job-specific goals to increase career readiness.
- Quad 9: This is for students in grades k-2 on the autism spectrum with a strong focus on academics and integration to school-based instruction.
- Quad 10: Students participate in shared instruction at nearby John Dewey High School and work towards a high school diploma.

=== Vocational programs ===
The school offers students various programs to prepare students for employment. The school has a professional kitchen, bake shop, print shop and mock corner store. Students can practice various career skills including lamination, paper shredding, custodial and maintenance, food collection and distribution, office supply organizing and order fulfilment, hygiene supply order fulfillment, in-school mailing services, recycling, greeting card production, personal shopper, laundromat services, hydroponics and gardening.

These programs are paired with outside paid work programs, including the Summer Youth Employment Program and the Training Opportunities Program (TOP). The school also partnered with ACCES-VR, the New York State Office for People With Developmental Disabilities and AHRC New York City.

Students have the opportunity to make various crafts such as candles, jewelry, customized masks, up-cycled vases, and much more. Once a month students lead pop-up shops to sell the items they created.

The school also hosts an annual internship fair where students showcase their experience to community organizations and agencies for training and job opportunities.

== Demographics ==
The school's racial composition is very diverse. African American students made up 35% of the school's student population, a plurality of the student body. White students made up over one-quarter (27%), Hispanic and Latino (of any race) students made up a quarter (25%), Asian American students made up 10%, and Native Americans made up the remaining 2%.

Enrollment by Race/Ethnicity 2020–2021
Black	Hispanic	White	Asian	Two or more races	American Indian/Alaska Native	Native Hawaiian/Pacific Islander
753	486	264	259	22	17	15

== Accolades ==
In May 2019, the school won $11,000 from Pix 11's Fuel My School contest against Sunset Park High School.

In May 2019, physical education teacher Douglas Rebecca won the Big Apple Award.

In 2016, the school won 1st place in New York City Department of Transportation Annual We're Walking Here Public Service Announcement Contest.

In July 2016, four students represented the New York City FC in Massachusetts, in the Special Olympics New England Revolution game.
