= Ontario Certified Teacher =

Professional designation

Ontario Certified Teacher (OCT) is the designation of professionals which is granted by the Council of the Ontario College of Teachers to qualified, registered members in good standing. OCT is the designation required of all teachers who teach in publicly funded schools in Ontario. There are over 200,000 OCTs in Ontario.

== Support for a professional designation for Ontario teachers ==
In its 2007 annual survey of members, the Ontario College of Teachers learned that teachers didn't feel entirely appreciated as professionals. Respondents said that teaching as a profession stood behind doctors, accountants and lawyers in terms of public respect. Only 56 per cent thought licensed teachers received professional recognition in the community commensurate with their education and contributions.

In July 2008, the college hosted focus groups with college members and the public and, in August, conducted an online survey of members. More than 5,000 college members responded, 4201 to the electronic survey. Most voiced strong support for professional designation. Eighty-seven per cent of those in focus groups supported the idea. Eighty per cent of those who answered the electronic survey endorsed the notion. Sixty-six per cent of those reached by telephone also approved. As well, the majority of responding stakeholder groups supported the idea and the rationale behind it. Only one expressed strong reservations against.

National market research and public consultation firm Angus Reid Strategies was engaged to provide independent oversight to the focus groups and online survey of members.

The college's council approved use of the designation in September 2008 by certified, qualified college members in good standing.

== Criteria ==
An OCT is a teaching professional with specific knowledge and skills in the areas of child development, curriculum, assessment, teaching methods, and classroom management. OCTs must meet the education, experience, and other requirements established by the Ontario College of Teachers. As part of their commitment to career-long professional learning, OCTs may enhance their qualifications through Additional Qualification (AQ) courses established by the Ontario College of Teachers.

Only Ontario College of Teachers members in good standing can use the designation. College members who fail to pay their fees and are therefore ineligible to teach in Ontario’s publicly funded schools cannot use it. College members whose teaching certificates have been revoked or suspended as a result of disciplinary measures are also ineligible to use the OCT designation.

Certified college members in good standing have the right to use OCT on letterhead, business cards and professional materials.

The qualifications of every OCT holder can be seen on the college's web site, www.oct.ca, in the ‘Find a Teacher’ section.

== Controversy ==
The designation is controversial with varied support from Ontario's teachers federations. The Ontario Teachers Federation stated in 2009 Should teachers wish to use a designation to indicate their profession, they are entitled to use B.Ed. or Dip. Ed. after their names.
