= British Columbia Teachers' Federation =

Canadian trade union

- Abbreviation: BCTF
- Formation: 1917; 109 years ago
- Type: Trade union
- Headquarters: Vancouver, British Columbia, Canada
- Location: British Columbia, Canada
- Members: 45,000
- President: Carole Gordon
- Affiliations: British Columbia Federation of Labour; Canadian Labour Congress; Canadian Teachers' Federation
- Website: bctf.ca

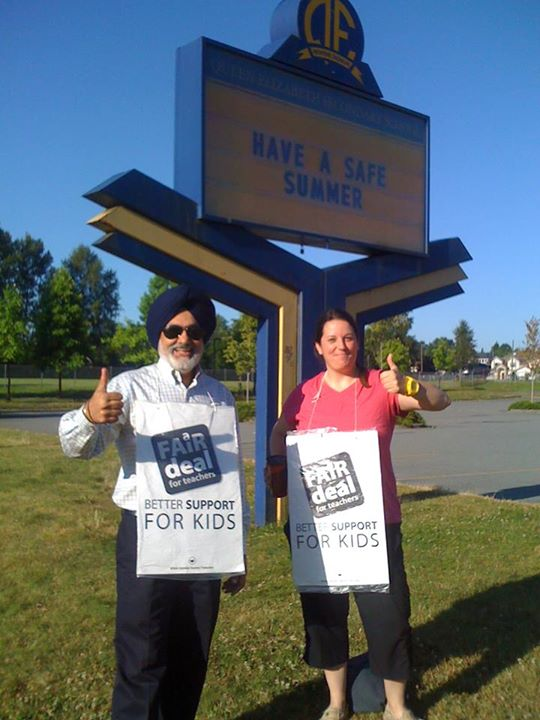
BC teachers campaign

The British Columbia Teachers' Federation (BCTF) is the labour union that represents all public school teachers in the province of British Columbia, Canada. It was established as an organization in 1917.

== Governance structure ==
As of 2018, the BCTF was made up of 45,000 teachers from across the province of British Columbia.

Members

Members of the BCTF determine the decisions and directions of the BCTF in two ways:

- Members, through locals, elect delegates to the BCTF Annual General Meeting (AGM). The AGM makes key decisions for the organization and elects the Executive Committee.
- Members, through locals, elect local representatives, who make up the Representative Assembly (RA). The RA has key decision-making responsibilities.

Locals

Locals are responsible for acting on behalf of members regarding local matters. Members in locals elect their local president and executive, who guide the affairs of the local.

Annual General Meeting

The Annual General Meeting is a meeting of delegates and local representatives elected by members through locals and the eleven members of the Executive Committee. There are approximately 670 voting delegates at an Annual General Meeting.

Constitution and bylaws

The constitution and bylaws establish the rules by which the organization is run.

Representative Assembly

The Representative Assembly meets three times a year and has the responsibilities of approving a budget and electing the Judicial Council and Committee of Ombudspersons. The RA also makes policy and procedural decisions for the federation.

Executive Committee

The Executive Committee (EC) of the BCTF is elected by the AGM and consists of eleven members. Three of these serve in a full-time capacity: the President, the First Vice-President, and the Second Vice-President. The EC has overall responsibility for the running of the federation. It meets monthly, with additional meetings as necessary. The EC is the employer of BCTF staff and determines what work will be done in any given year. It also has responsibility for the creation and appointment of any advisory committees or task forces.

President

The President of the federation has responsibility for overall supervision of the affairs of the organization between meetings of the Executive Committee.

== 2005 contract dispute ==
Since 1992, contract negotiations for BC public school teachers have been on a province-wide basis, negotiating a single contract with the British Columbia Public School Employers' Association (BCPSEA). Since that time, each contract has been legislated into law by the government of the day because the teachers and the employers have failed to reach an agreement.

Negotiations began between the teachers and the BCPSEA after the contract expired in June 2004.

Without a contract at the beginning of the new school year, negotiations soured and an agreement was unlikely. To pressure the BCPSEA and the government to capitulate on wage and classroom size demands, on September 27, over 88 per cent of 31,740 teachers voted to begin job action by withdrawing supervisory and administrative duties. Without successful contract negotiation, more severe action would begin on October 11.

With negotiations derailed and a strike imminent, the government introduced legislation on October 5 to extend the previous contract through the end of the school year—June 2006—at which time the across-the-board wage freeze would be revisited. After a filibuster by the official opposition BC NDP, Bill 12 passed on October 7. Furthermore, the BCPSEA successfully applied to the British Columbia Labour Relations Board (BCLRB) to deem any strike action illegal.

The BCTF held an emergency vote to carry out the strike despite the BCLRB ruling, with 90.5 per cent of the participating members voting in favour of proceeding with protest action.

The BCTF began a strike on October 7, 2005. It maintained that breaking the law for a just cause (having its collective bargaining rights limited and a contract imposed) was acceptable. Critics of the BCTF claimed that the job action set a bad example for the children they teach. The job action was illegal because teaching in British Columbia was considered an essential service and teachers were not allowed to strike. The BCTF, however, maintained that under the provisions of the Canadian Charter of Rights and Freedoms and the non-binding decisions of the United Nations International Labour Organization, education is not an essential service and it had the right to political protest.

Following the strike action, the BCPSEA filed a complaint in the BC Supreme Court on October 6 to find the BCTF in contempt of court, and on October 9 Justice Brenda Brown declared the BCTF in contempt, ordering teachers to return to work October 11.

On October 12, a small number of defiant teachers began crossing picket lines and returned to work.

As a result of the continuing defiance of her court order, Justice Brenda Brown on October 13 ordered the BCTF to cease paying strike pay to its members or use its funds to prolong the strike.

On October 17, the BC Federation of Labour spearheaded a major labour shutdown of the province's capital, Victoria. Termed a "Day of Protest" rather than a general strike, the city saw the vast majority of its public services crippled by labour action. The event culminated in a massive protest at the Legislature, where it was estimated that up to 20,000 people rallied.

On the same day, Premier Gordon Campbell made his first public comments during the strike. He called on the BCTF to obey the law and said that the union has "made a complete mockery of the British Columbia Supreme Court." He reiterated his government's position that it would not negotiate with the BCTF while the BCTF was breaking the law.

The mediator Vince Ready was brought in and presented proposals to end the strike. Both the government and the BCTF accepted his recommendations, and on October 24, the teachers went back to work.

== 2006 contract negotiations ==
On June 9, 2006, the union announced that if a contract was not reached before the start of the school year, it was prepared to commence labour disruption (strike) activities, including a possible full withdrawal of service. Of the 30,202 members who voted, 85.2 per cent were in favour of a strike.

Talks between the union and the government proceeded without much progress. The main sticking point was compensation, with the government offering a 10 per cent increase (up from 8 per cent) over four years and the union asking for a 19 per cent increase (down from 24 per cent) over three years.

Late in the day on June 30, 2006, the two sides reached a tentative agreement for a 16 per cent increase in wages and benefits over a five-year contract. Because the agreement was reached before the month-end deadline, teachers were eligible for a signing bonus of approximately $4,000.

== 2011 contract negotiations ==
The next round of negotiations began in 2011, when the previous contract expired. The provincial government demanded the same net zero outcome accepted by all other public sector unions. Additionally, the government sought more control over professional development, reduced seniority provisions, and increased teacher evaluation and accountability.

The BCTF demanded a 15 per cent wage increase over three years (costed at $560 million by the BCTF and $2 billion by the provincial government), increased paid prep time, improved benefits, additional leave, and an additional six discretionary leave days per year to care for a sick friend or relative (a request that was later dropped).

== Affiliation history ==
- British Columbia Federation of Labour (2003–present)
- Canadian Labour Congress (2006–present)
- Canadian Teachers' Federation (1920–present)
- Canadian Trades and Labour Congress (1943–1956)

== See also ==
- Education in British Columbia
- List of trade unions in Canada
