= Ontario Teachers' Federation =

- Abbreviation: OTF
- Formation: 1944
- Type: Trade union centre
- Headquarters: Toronto, Ontario, Canada
- Location: Ontario, Canada
- President: Michael Foulds
- Secretary-treasurer: Ian S. Pettigrew
- Subsidiaries: Ontario Teachers' Pension Plan
- Website: otffeo.on.ca/en

The Ontario Teachers' Federation (OTF; French: Fédération des enseignantes et des enseignants de l'Ontario, FEO) is the professional body representing over 160,000 teachers in Ontario's publicly funded schools. It operates the Ontario Teachers' Pension Plan (OTPP), which in 2021, was Canada's largest single-profession pension plan, with around $200 billion in managed assets. OTF was established by the Teaching Profession Act of 1944. The four Ontario teacher federations are OTF affiliates: the Association des enseignantes et des enseignants franco-ontariens (AEFO), the Elementary Teachers' Federation of Ontario (ETFO); the Ontario English Catholic Teachers' Association (OECTA); and the Ontario Secondary School Teachers' Federation (OSSTF). All teachers in Ontario's publicly funded schools belong to one of the affiliates and to OTF.

== History ==
OTF was established by the Teaching Profession Act of 1944.

In 1997, the organization saw thousands of teachers and supporters on the front lawn of the Ontario Legislature in Toronto for a strike.

The Ontario Teachers' Pension Plan lost $19 billion in 2008.

Between 2008 and 2009, net assets fell to $87.4 billion from $108.5 billion.

In 2018, there were five teachers' unions that comprised the Ontario Teachers' Federation (OTF), at which point it was described as a union representing around 160,000 public school teachers.

In January 2022, the OTF came to an agreement with education minister Stephen Leccee to allow retired teachers to be re-employed for 95 days instead of 50, to help deal with returning to school.

In January 2022, the OTF came to an agreement with education minister Stephen Leccee to temporarily allow retired teachers to be re-employed for 95 days instead of 50, to help deal with returning to school.

== Presidents ==
- Eileen Lennon
- Joe Lamoureux — 2009
- Chris Cowley — 2017
- Diane Dewing — 2018
- Parker Robinson — 2020-2021
- Chris Cowley — 2021-2022
- Nathan Core — 2022-2023
- Yves Durocher — 2023-2024

== Overview ==
OTF is a member of the Canadian Teachers' Federation and Education International.

OTF's mandate is to advocate for teachers, the teaching profession, and publicly funded education. It represents the interests of all teachers who are pension plan members - active and retired - as the Partner with the Ontario Government in sponsoring the Ontario Teachers' Pension Plan (OTPP). Moreover, as the official liaison between teachers and the Minister of Education, OTF provides advice and input to both the Minister and the Ministry about policy decisions related to matters such as curriculum, assessment, instructional technology, special education, among others. It amplifies teachers' voices with political parties, parents, and the public.

OTF offers a variety of services and supports for teachers. It supports learning and networking among the Subject and Division Associations through the OTF Curriculum Forum. OTF provides professional learning opportunities and online teaching resources for its members in areas such as financial literacy, safe and inclusive schools, special education, and working with parents, to name a few. OTF also provides supports for teacher candidates and beginning teachers.

OTF works with allies in the labour movement, partners in education, and like-minded social justice groups. OTF also supports numerous charitable organizations and groups dedicated to social justice and equity such as Frontier College, Indspire, Summer Literacy Camps, and CIVIX. As well, OTF provides financial assistance to underserved schools through its international assistance program.
