= Association des enseignantes et des enseignants franco-ontariens =

Canadian education trade union

- Abbreviation: AEFO
- Formation: 12 May 1939; 87 years ago
- Type: Trade union
- Headquarters: Ottawa, Ontario, Canada
- Location: Ontario, Canada
- Members: 13,110 (2021)
- Official language: French
- President: Gabrielle Lemieux
- Director general: Anne Lavoie
- Affiliations: Canadian Teachers' Federation; Ontario Teachers' Federation
- Website: aefo.on.ca
- Formerly called: Association de l'enseignement bilingue de l'Ontario (1939–1940); Association de l'enseignement français (1940–1946); Association de l'enseignement français de l'Ontario (1946–1962); Association des enseignants franco-ontariens (1962–1985)

The Association des enseignantes et des enseignants franco-ontariens (AEFO; lit. 'Franco-Ontarian Teachers' Association') is a Canadian trade union representing 13,110 teachers and other workers in Ontario's French-language public education system, including employees both of secular and Roman Catholic school boards. It also represents workers at the Lycée Claudel d'Ottawa, Le Cap in Ottawa, and the Centre Jules-Léger. Founded on 12 May 1939, the association is an affiliate of the Ontario Teachers' Federation and the Canadian Teachers' Federation.

== See also ==
- Education in Ontario
- French language in Canada
- Official bilingualism in Canada
- Ontario English Catholic Teachers' Association
- Ontario Secondary School Teachers' Federation
