= Ontario Federation of Labour =

Trade union centre

- Abbreviation: OFL
- Formation: 1944/1957
- Type: Trade union centre
- Headquarters: Toronto, Ontario, Canada
- Location: Ontario, Canada
- Members: 700,000
- President: Laura Walton
- Secretary-treasurer: Ahmad Gaied
- Executive vice-president: Jackie Taylor
- Parent organization: Canadian Labour Congress
- Website: ofl.ca

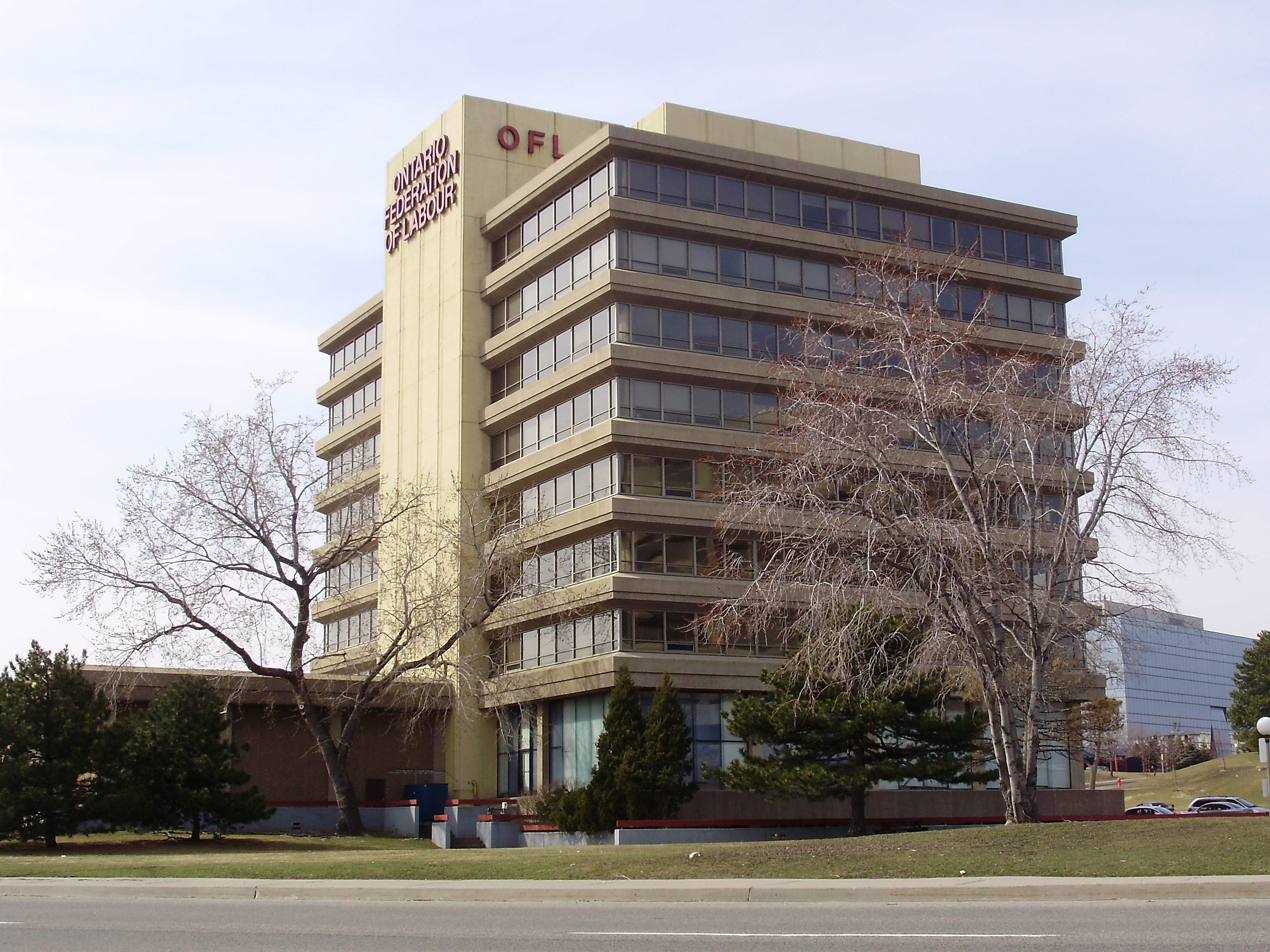
Former offices of the Ontario Federation of Labour in Toronto (1968—2021)

The Ontario Federation of Labour is a federation of labour unions in the Canadian province of Ontario. The original OFL was established by the Canadian Congress of Labour in 1944. It was merged with the rival Ontario Provincial Federation of Labour in 1957 (now considered the modern OFL's founding date), one year after the merger of the CCL and the Trades and Labour Congress (the OPFL's parent federation). It is now the provincial federation of the Canadian Labour Congress.

Elroy Robson was the original OFL's first president and William Sefton was its first secretary-treasurer. Policy conventions are held every two years. Today, the federation represents 54 unions and a million workers who belong to its affiliated trade unions.

== Officers of the OFL since 1957 ==
=== Presidents ===
- Cleve Kidd (1957–1958)
- David Archer (1958–1976)
- Cliff Pilkey (1976–1986)
- Gord Wilson (1986–1997)
- Wayne Samuelson (1997–2009)
- Sid Ryan (2009–2015)
- Chris Buckley (2015–2019)
- Patty Coates (2019–2023)
- Laura Walton (2023 - present)

=== Secretary-Treasurer ===
- Douglas Hamilton (1957–1970)
- Terry Meagher (1970–1984)
- Wally Majesky (1984–1986)
- Sean O'Flynn (1986–1988)
- Julie Davis (1988–1995)
- Ethel Birkett-LaValley (1995–2005)
- Irene Harris (2005–2009)
- Marie Kelly (2009–2011)
- Nancy Hutchison (2011–2015)
- Patty Coates (2015-2019)
- Ahmad Gaied (2019–present)

=== Executive Vice-Presidents ===
- Julie Davis (1986–1988)
- Ken Signoretti (1988–1997)
- Irene Harris (1997–2005)
- Terry Downey (2005–2011)
- Irwin Nanda (2011–2015)
- Ahmad Gaied (2015-2019)
- Janice Folk-Dawson (2019–2023)
- Jackie Taylor (2023—2025)

== Campaigns ==
The OFL's primarily helps coordinate and support labour actions, strikes, and bargaining of Ontario's labour unions. Where the law impedes this work the OFL has historically campaigned to have such legislation repealed. Where the law is lacking, the OFL has historically campaigned for new legislation to be introduced. The following are some of the campaigns the OFL has run since establishment:

- Campaign challenging the provincial Judicature Act (1965)
- Day of protest challenging Pierre Trudeau's use of federal powers to interfere in collective bargaining (1976)
- I Care About Medicare (1979)
- Ontario Can Work (1980)
- Affirmative Action, Equal Pay, Pay Equity, Employment Equity (1980-1990)
- New ERA (Economic Recovery Alternative) (1982)
- Scrap Bill 162 (1987)
- A Job To Die For (1990s)
- Positive Space (1999)
- Keep Your Promises, Dalton (2004)
- Jobs Worth Fighting For (2005)
