= Ontario Secondary School Teachers' Federation =

Canadian education trade union

- Abbreviation: OSSTF
- Formation: 1919; 107 years ago
- Type: Trade union
- Headquarters: Toronto, Ontario, Canada
- Location: Ontario, Canada
- Members: 60,000
- President: Martha Hradowy
- Affiliations: Canadian Labour Congress; Canadian Teachers' Federation; Ontario Federation of Labour; Ontario Teachers' Federation
- Website: osstf.on.ca

The Ontario Secondary School Teachers' Federation (OSSTF) (Note: French: Fédération des enseignantes-enseignants des écoles secondaires de l'Ontario, FEESO) is a Canadian trade union which represents 60,000 members across Ontario.

Founded in 1919, its membership includes public high school teachers, occasional teachers, teaching assistants, psychoeducational consultants, social workers, child and youth counsellors, speech-language pathologists, continuing education teachers, early childhood educators, instructors, and support staff from several Ontario universities.

== 2012–2013 labour dispute ==
On September 11, 2012, Bill 115, the Putting Students First Act, a piece of legislation that could impose a two-year contract on teachers and make it easier for the government to end strikes, passes in the provincial legislature followed by a legal challenge of the bill on October 11, 2012, by the four education unions, including the OSSTF.

On December 3, 2012, OSSTF announced that high school teachers will not lead any extracurricular activities. OSSTF also stated that high school teachers will report only 15 minutes before the start of the school day and leave immediately after classes. On December 31, 2012, the deadline for a collective agreement passes with no agreement. As a result, on January 3, 2013, Minister of Education Laurel Broten announced that she has imposed contracts on teachers and that she will be repealing the bill.

On January 9, 2013, OSSTF announced that they planned a one-day, province-wide walkout on January 16, 2013. On January 10, 2013, the provincial government went to the Ontario Labour Relations Board to stop the walkout, and the following day, on January 11, the board ruled the strike was illegal and as a result it was called off.

== 2014–2016 labour dispute ==
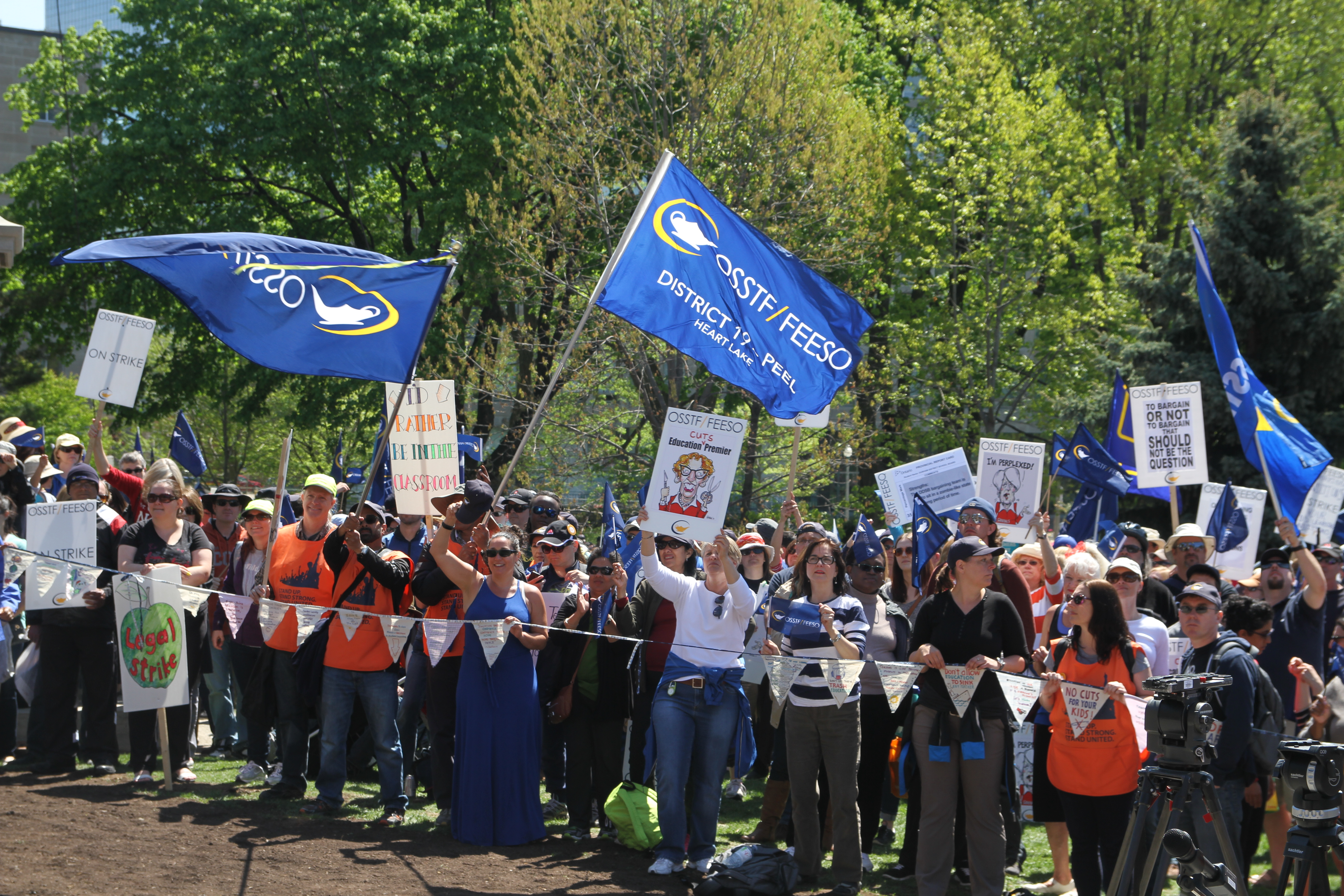
OSSTF Members in Peel Region demonstrating in 2015 following failed negotiations

In April 2014, the Government of Ontario passed Bill 122, the School Boards Collective Bargaining Act which implemented a new two-tier negotiation system which involves provincial negotiations, between the Government and the OSSTF, along with local negotiations, between local OSSTF and their employer, the school board. The OSSTF contract expired at the end of August 2014, at which time negotiations began to occur under the new two-tiered bargaining system.

On April 8, 2015, OSSTF members employed by the Durham District School Board announced that a strike would occur if a local deal is not reached by April 20, 2015. On April 20, 2015, as talks failed, OSSTF members employed by the Durham District School Board, over 1,500 members, went on strike putting roughly 24,000 students out of the classroom across 24 secondary schools.

On April 10, 2015, OSSTF members employed by the Rainbow District School Board announced that a strike would occur if a local deal is not reached by April 27, 2015. On April 25, 2015, it was announced that talks have failed and as a result OSSTF members employed by the Rainbow District School Board went on strike on April 27, 2015. This strike impacted ten secondary schools.

On April 21, 2015, OSSTF members employed by the Peel District School Board announced that a strike would occur if a local deal is not reached by May 4, 2015. In the early morning hours of May 4, 2015, it was announced that attempts at a deal were unsuccessful, as a result members of OSSTF employed by the Peel District School Board went on strike on May 4, 2015. This was the largest of the strikes, resulting in 4,200 teachers walking off the job putting roughly 42,000 students out of the classroom across 36 secondary schools. On May 4, 2015, negotiations reached an impasse at the provincial level, negotiations once again resumed before reaching an impasse once again on May 24, 2015.

On May 15, 2015, OSSTF District 20, of the Halton District School Board and District 25, of the Ottawa-Carleton District School Board announced a selective withdrawal of services if a local deal was not reached by May 21, 2015. A deal was not reached by this date and selective withdrawal of services occurred until the end of the school year in June.

On May 25, 2015, the Government of Ontario passed back to work legislation to put an end to the strike in Durham, Rainbow and Peel District School Boards. The following day on May 26, 2015, the Ontario Labour Relations Board ruled the teachers strike was unlawful. Classes resumed in Durham, Rainbow and Peel the following day on May 27, 2015.

On May 27, 2015, the OSSTF announced that a full strike would resume in Durham, Rainbow and Peel on June 10, 2015, as this would be past the two-week moratorium imposed by Bernard Fishbein, Chair of the Ontario Labour Relations Board. A strike did not occur on June 10, 2015, as the Protecting the School Year Act, 2015, passed by the Government of Ontario prohibited another strike during the 2014–2015 school year.

On August 20, 2015, a tentative agreement was reached between the Government of Ontario, the Ontario School Boards Association and the OSSTF. The tentative agreement was later ratified on September 18, 2015.

On April 25, 2016, three divisions of the OSSTF remained without local contracts, these three are those of the Rainy River District School Board, Trillium Lakelands District School Board and Toronto District School Board. In the Trillium Lakelands District School Board and Toronto District School Board, members are involved in job action such as refusing to do some administrative work and refusing to write report card comments. On April 29, 2016, the OSSTF division of the Rainy River District School Board announced that they would begin rotating weekly one-day strikes. The first of the one-day rotating strikes occurred on May 3, 2016.

== 2019–2020 labour dispute ==
On November 19, 2020, OSSTF teachers in the TDSB took a work-to-rule position following failed contract talks. This escalated into a full strike on December 4. They struck again on December 11. They participated in a rotating strike on March 5, 2020. They struck again on March 27, eventually reaching a deal with the Government of Ontario on April 20.

== See also ==
- Association des enseignantes et des enseignants franco-ontariens
- Education in Ontario
- Elementary Teachers' Federation of Ontario
- Ontario English Catholic Teachers' Association
