= List of French Canadian writers from outside Quebec =

Although most Canadian francophone writers are from Quebec, there are also a number of francophone writers from elsewhere in Canada. These writers may be Acadian, Franco-ontarian or from any other Canadian province.

Some of these writers did move to Quebec at a later stage in their careers, and hence may also be listed at List of writers from Quebec, although others did not.

This list includes songwriters as well as literary authors and poets.

== Acadian writers ==
- Anselme Chiasson
- Herménégilde Chiasson
- Gracia Couturier
- France Daigle
- Clive Doucet
- Lennie Gallant
- Hélène Harbec
- Gérald Leblanc
- Antonine Maillet
- Alfred Silver
- Serge Patrice Thibodeau

== Franco-Ontarian writers ==
- Marguerite Andersen
- Marcel Aymar
- Angèle Bassolé-Ouédraogo
- Estelle Beauchamp
- Michel Bock
- Hédi Bouraoui
- Lysette Brochu
- Lorenzo Cadieux
- Franco Catanzariti
- Soufiane Chakkouche
- Andrée Christensen
- Antonio D'Alfonso
- Michel Dallaire
- Jean-Marc Dalpé
- Paul Demers
- Robert Dickson
- Fernand Dorais
- Jean Mohsen Fahmy
- Doric Germain
- Gaétan Gervais
- Joseph Groulx
- Brigitte Haentjens
- Maurice Henrie
- Naim Kattan
- Aristote Kavungu
- Hélène Koscielniak
- Chloé LaDuchesse
- Michèle Laframboise
- Didier Leclair
- Françoise Lepage
- Daniel Marchildon
- Robert Marinier
- Melchior Mbonimpa
- Blaise Ndala
- Gabriel Osson
- André Paiement
- Rachel Paiement
- Robert Paquette
- Stéphane Paquette
- François Paré
- Daniel Poliquin
- Gabrielle Poulin
- Stefan Psenak
- Aurélie Resch
- Guy Sylvestre
- Alex Tétreault
- Lola Lemire Tostevin
- Christine Dumitriu Van Saanen
- Nancy Vickers

== Western Canadian writers ==
- Nancy Huston
- Daniel Lavoie
- J. R. (Roger) Léveillé
- Marguerite-A. Primeau
- Gabrielle Roy
- Annette Saint-Pierre
- Ying Chen

== See also ==
- Lists of Canadian writers
