= List of Franco-Ontarians =

The following is a list of Franco-Ontarians.

== A ==
- Levi Addison Ault, businessman and bureaucrat closely associated with Cincinnati, Ohio
- Jeremie Albino, singer
- Marcel Aymar, singer

== B ==
- Estelle Beauchamp, writer
- Érik Bédard, former starting pitcher for 6 teams in Major League Baseball
- Mauril Bélanger, federal Member of Parliament
- Napoléon Belcourt, Speaker of the House of Commons (1904–1905)
- Rhéal Bélisle, politician
- Avril Benoît, former radio broadcaster
- Justin Bieber, singer
- Gilles Bisson, Member of Provincial Parliament
- Paul Bissonnette, NHL player, podcaster on Spittin' Chiclets on Barstool Sports
- Stephen Blais, politician
- Hector "Toe" Blake, NHL player and coach
- Michel Bock, historian
- Raymond Bonin, federal Member of Parliament
- Evan Bouchard, NHL player
- Bruce Boudreau, NHL coach
- Maxime Boudreault, World's Strongest Man competitor
- Don Boudria, federal Member of Parliament
- Guy Bourgouin, Member of Provincial Parliament
- Dan Boyle, NHL player
- Rod Brind'Amour, NHL player
- Jean-Serge Brisson, political activist, tax reform advocate, politician, and author
- Lysette Brochu, writer
- Andrew Brunette, NHL player
- Paul Byron, NHL player

== C ==
- Lorenzo Cadieux, writer
- Robert Campeau, financier, real estate developer
- Joseph Caron, diplomat, Canadian High Commissioner to India
- Jim Carrey, comedian, actor
- Joseph Médard Carrière, academic
- Roch Castonguay, actor
- Soufiane Chakkouche, writer and journalist
- Mathieu Chantelois, television personality, journalist, magazine editor, and marketing executive
- Bob Chaperon, snooker player
- Louise Charron, Supreme Court justice
- Andrée Christensen, writer
- Dan Cloutier, National Hockey League goaltender
- Cal Clutterbuck, NHL player
- Lucille Collard, politician

== D ==
- Michel Dallaire, writer
- Jean-Marc Dalpé, writer
- Jonathan David, soccer player
- Gaston Demers, politician
- Paul Demers, singer-songwriter
- Paul Desmarais Jr., CEO Power Corporation of Montreal
- Nathalie Des Rosiers, politician
- Véronic DiCaire, singer and imitator
- Robert Dickson, writer
- Dionne quintuplets
- Ron Duguay, NHL hockey player
- Edith Dumont, educator

== F ==
- Jean Mohsen Fahmy, writer

== G ==
- Royal Galipeau, federal Member of Parliament
- Jean-Robert Gauthier, federal Member of Parliament and Senator
- Léo Gauthier, politician
- France Gélinas, member of the Legislative Assembly of Ontario
- Doric Germain, writer and academic
- Gaétan Gervais, writer and academic
- Claude Giroux, National Hockey League player
- Marc Godbout, federal Member of Parliament
- Osias Godin, politician
- Ryan Gosling, actor
- Sebastien Grainger, musician (Death From Above 1979, Sebastien Grainger and the Mountains)
- Gil Grand, musician
- Pierre Granger, host and journalist (Le Téléjournal, Panorama)
- Claude Gravelle, politician
- Valérie Grenier, World Cup Gold medalist alpine skier
- Erik Gudbranson, NHL player

== H ==
- Bob Hartley, National Hockey League coach
- Chantal Hébert, journalist and commentator
- Maurice Henrie, writer

== J ==
- Aurèle Joliat, NHL player
- Claude Julien, National Hockey League coach

== K ==
- Aristote Kavungu, writer
- Arielle Kayabaga, Member of Parliament for London West

== L ==
- Chuck Labelle, country music artist from Mattawa, Ontario
- Chloé LaDuchesse, poet
- Kevin Lalande, NHL player
- Marie-France Lalonde, politician
- Newsy Lalonde, hockey player
- Edmond Lapierre, politician
- Viviane Lapointe, politician
- Claude Larose, NHL player
- Avril Lavigne, singer
- J. Conrad Lavigne, broadcast media proprietor
- Didier Leclair, writer
- Paul Lefebvre, former federal Member of Parliament and mayor of Greater Sudbury
- Julie Lemieux, voice actress

== M ==
- Pattie Mallette, mother of Justin Bieber
- Daniel Marchildon, writer
- Robert Marinier, writer and actor
- Diane Marleau, federal Member of Parliament and former Minister of Health
- Elie Martel, politician
- Shelley Martel, Member of Provincial Parliament, former Ministry of Northern Development and Mines (Ontario)
- Jacques Martin, National Hockey League coach
- Paul Martin (born 1938), former Prime Minister of Canada
- Marc Mayer, art curator
- Melchior Mbonimpa, writer and academic
- Mireille Messier, children's writer
- Marc Méthot, NHL player
- Joseph Montferrand (1802–1864), logger, inspiration for Big Joe Mufferaw legend
- Blain Morin, politician
- Guy Paul Morin, wrongfully convicted of the murder of Christine Jessop
- Alanis Morissette (born 1974), singer
- Wade Morissette (born 1974), musician and author; twin brother of Alanis

== N ==
- Richard Nadeau, Canadian politician, former Bloc Québécois Member of Parliament
- Isabelle Nélisse, actress
- Sophie Nélisse, actress

== O ==
- Gabriel Osson, writer

== P ==
- André Paiement, Canadian playwright and musician
- Rachel Paiement, singer and songwriter
- Wilf Paiement, NHL player
- Daniel Paillé, NHL player
- B. P. Paquette, filmmaker
- Robert Paquette, folksinger
- Stéphane Paquette, singer
- François Paré, author and academic
- Gilbert Parent, Speaker of the House of Commons (1994–2001)
- Jean-Paul Parisé, NHL player
- Matthew Peca, NHL player
- Suzanne Pinel, children's entertainer (Marie-Soleil)
- Jean Poirier, provincial politician and current head of ACFO
- Daniel Poliquin, novelist
- Denis Potvin, NHL player
- Gabrielle Poulin, writer
- Marie Poulin, senator and current president of the Liberal Party of Canada
- Benoît Pouliot, professional hockey player
- Gilles Pouliot, provincial minister and Ontario New Democratic Party MPP

== Q ==
- Jason Quenneville, music producer, songwriter

== R ==
- Morris Rainville, musician, songwriter
- F. Baxter Ricard, broadcast media proprietor
- Damien Robitaille, musician
- Derek Roy, NHL player

== S ==
- Lloyd St. Amand, federal Member of Parliament
- Brent St. Denis, federal Member of Parliament
- Denis St-Jules, writer and radio broadcaster
- Charles Sauriol, conservationist and naturalist
- Benoît Serré, politician
- Gaetan Serré, politician
- Marc Serré, politician
- Amanda Simard, politician
- Emma Spence, artistic gymnast
- Steve Sullivan, NHL player, hockey manager
- Guy Sylvestre, journalist, author, critic and former National Librarian of Canada

== T ==
- Alex Tétreault, poet and playwright
- Glenn Thibeault, politician
- Lola Lemire Tostevin, poet and novelist
- Alex Trebek (1940–2020), game show host (Jeopardy!)

== V ==
- Max Véronneau, NHL player
