= Trillium Book Award, French =

The following is a list of winners and nominees in French-language categories for the Trillium Book Award, a Canadian literary award presented by Ontario Creates to honour books published by writers resident in the province of Ontario. Separate awards have been presented for English-language literature since 1994; for the winners and nominees in English-language categories, see Trillium Book Award, English.

From 1994 to 2002, a single annual award was presented for French-language books regardless of genre; in 2002, an award for best first book of poetry was introduced for francophone poets, but was only presented once, and established poets were still considered for the main all-genre award.

In 2003, the award was fully split into separate categories for prose and poetry; however, in the second year of the poetry categories, the program failed to receive a sufficient number of submissions to present a French-language poetry award. The prize money that had been earmarked for the French poetry category was instead used that year to create an academic scholarship for French-language creative writing students in Ontario, and the category was further adjusted so that it now encompasses a two-year eligibility period instead of one, and alternates with a two-year category for French-language children's literature.

In 2024, for the first time since the two-year alternation for poetry and children's literature was introduced, the two-year eligibility period still did not produce enough French poetry titles to present an award in that category.

== All-genre (1994-2002) ==
Year	Author	Title	Ref
1994	Andrée Lacelle	Tant de vie s'égare	
1994	Michel Ouellette	French Town	
1994	Pierre Pelletier	Petites incarnations de la pensee delinquante	
1994	Daniel Poliquin	L'Écureuil noir	
1994	Gabrielle Poulin	Le Livre de déraison	
1994	Danièle Vallée	La Caisse	
1995	Maurice Henrie	Le Balcon dans le ciel	
1995	Estelle Beauchamp	Les Memoires de Christine Marshall	
1995	Andrée Lacelle	La Voyageuse	
1995	Alain Bernard Marchand	L'Homme qui pleure	
1995	Jean-Louis Trudel	Le prisonnier de Serendib	
1995	Jean-Louis Trudel	Les rescapés de Serendib	
1996	Nancy Vickers	Le Pied de Sappho	
1996	Alain Bernard Marchand	Tintin au pays de la ferveur	
1996	Hélène Brodeur	L'Ermitage	
1996	Nicole V. Champeau	O Sirènes, libérez-moi	
1996	Robert Marinier	L'Insomnie	
1997	Roger Levac	Petite Crapaude!	
1997	Michel Dallaire	Ponts brûlés et appartenances	
1997	Robbert Fortin	Jour buvard d'encre	
1997	Pierre Raphaël Pelletier	La voie de Laum	
1997	Stefan Psenak	Le fantasme d'immortalité	
1998	Daniel Poliquin	L'homme de paille	
1998	Stefan Psenak	Du chaos et de l'ordre des choses	
1998	Marguerite Andersen	Les Crus de l'Esplanade	
1998	Jean Mohsen Fahmy	Amina et le mamelouk blanc	
1998	Pierre Raphaël Pelletier	Il faut crier l'injure	
1998	Stefan Psenak	Les corps en sursis	
1999	Andrée Christensen, Jacques Flamand	Lithochronos ou le premier vol de la pierre	
1999	Hédi Bouraoui	Ainsi parle la Tour CN	
1999	Claude Guilmain	L'Égoiste	
1999	Michel Ouellette	La dernière fugue	
1999	Claire Rochon	La Ville bleue	
2000	Didier Leclair	Toronto, je t'aime	
2000	Marguerite Andersen	Bleu sur blanc	
2000	Michel A. Therien	Corps sauvage	
2000	Arash Mohtashami-Maali	Deuils d'automne	
2000	Pierre Raphaël Pelletier	La Donne	
2001	Michèle Matteau	Cognac et Porto	
2001	Esther Beauchemin	Maïta	
2001	Antonio D'Alfonso	Comment ça se passe	
2001	Richard J. Léger	Faust: chroniques de la démesure	
2001	Melchior Mbonimpa	Le Totem des Baranda	
2002	Michel Ouellette	Le testament du couturier	
2002	Danièle Vallée	Debout sur la tete d'un chat	
2002	Michel A. Therien	Eaux d'Ève	
2002	Robert Dickson	Humains paysages en temps de paix relative	
2002	Pierre Raphaël Pelletier	Meme les fougeres ont des cancers de peau	

== Prose (2003-present) ==
Year	Author	Title	Ref
2003	Serge Denis	Social-démocratie et mouvements ouvriers	
2003	François Paré	La distance habitée	
2003	Franco Catanzariti	Sahel	
2003	Michèle Cook	En un tour de main	
2003	Gabrielle Poulin	Ombres et lueurs	
2004	Antonio D'Alfonso	Un vendredi du mois d'aout	
2004	Marguerite Andersen	Parallèles	
2004	Jacques Flamand	Quand eclate la pierre (1986-2004)	
2004	Maurice Henrie	Les Roses et le verglas	
2004	Nathalie Stephens	L'Injure	
2005	Jean Mohsen Fahmy	L'Agonie des dieux	
2005	Gilles Dubois	L'homme aux yeux de loup	
2005	Robert Marinier	Épinal	
2005	Pierre Raphaël Pelletier	Pour ce qui reste de la beauté du monde	
2005	Colette St-Denis	Un temps pour se souvenir	
2006	Paul Savoie	Crac	
2006	Daniel Castillo Durante	La Passion des nomades	
2006	Marguerite Andersen	Doucement le bonheur	
2006	Claude Forand	Ainsi parle le Saigneur	
2006	Daniel Poliquin	La Kermesse	
2007	Pierre Raphaël Pelletier	L'Oeil de la lumière	
2007	Andrée Christensen	Depuis toujours, j'entendais la mer	
2007	Michel Dallaire	l'anarchie des innocences	
2007	Gilles Lacombe	La Jouissance des nuages de la pensee	
2007	Richard Poulin	Enfances devastees, tome 1 : L'Enfer de la prostitution	
2007	Michèle Vinet	Parce que chanter c'est trop dur	
2008	Marguerite Andersen	Le Figuier sur le toit	
2008	Hédi Bouraoui	Cap Nord	
2008	Daniel Marchildon	L'Eau de vie	
2008	Melchior Mbonimpa	La terre sans mal	
2008	Nancy Vickers	Aeterna: Le jardin des immortelles	
2009	Ryad Assani-Razaki	Deux Cercles	
2009	Nicole V. Champeau	Pointe Maligne: L'infiniment oubliee	
2009	Jean Mohsen Fahmy	Frères ennemis	
2009	Daniel Poliquin	René Lévesque	
2009	Daniel Soha	La Maison: une parabole	
2010	Estelle Beauchamp	Un souffle venu de loin	
2010	Murielle Beaulieu	Laisse-moi te dire	
2010	Andrée Christensen	La mémoire de l'aile	
2010	Michel Dallaire	pendant que l'Autre en moi t'ecoute	
2010	Didier Leclair	Le soixantieme parallèle	
2011	Michèle Vinet	Jeudi Novembre	
2011	Yann Garvoz	Plantation Massa-Lanmaux	
2011	Maurice Henrie	L'enfant Cement	
2011	Monia Mazigh	Miroirs et mirages	
2011	Joëlle Roy	Xman est back en Huronie	
2012	Paul Savoie	Bleu bemol	
2012	Claude Guilmain	Comment on dit ça, -- t'es mort --, en anglais?	
2012	Marie-Josée Martin	Un jour, ils entendront mes silences	
2012	Michèle Matteau	Avant que ne tombe la nuit	
2012	Daniel Soha	Le manuscrit	
2013	Marguerite Andersen	La mauvaise mère	
2013	Andrée Christensen	Racines de neige	
2013	Véronique-Marie Kaye	Afghanistan	
2013	Philippe Porée-Kurrer	Les Gardiens de l'Onirisphere : La revelation de Stockholm	
2013	Danièle Vallée	Sous la jupe	
2014	Michel Dallaire	Violoncelle pour lune d'automne	
2014	Martine Batanian	Clinique	
2014	Blaise Ndala	J'irai danser sur la tombe de Senghor	
2014	Daniel Poliquin	Le vol de l'ange	
2014	Patricia Smart	De Marie de l'Incarnation à Nelly Arcan	
2015	Véronique-Marie Kaye	Marjorie Chalifoux	
2015	Alain Doom	Un neurinome sur une balancoire	
2015	Caroline Durand	Nourrir la machine humaine	
2015	Didier Leclair	Pour l'amour de Dimitri	
2015	Carlos Taveira	Mots et marees, tome 2 : Les maux de Marie-Josephe-Angelique	
2016	Jean Boisjoli	La Mésure du temps	
2016	Louis L'Allier	Nikolaos, le copiste	
2016	Éric Mathieu	Les suicides d'Eau-Claire	
2016	Paul-Francois Sylvestre	Cinquante ans de 'p'tits bonheurs' au Theatre francais de Toronto	
2016	Michèle Vinet	L'enfant-feu	
2017	Aurélie Resch	Sous le soleil de midi	
2017	Maurice Henrie	Le poids du temps	
2017	Didier Leclair	Le bonheur est un parfum sans nom	
2017	Alain Bernard Marchand	Sept vies, dix-sept morts	
2017	Blaise Ndala	Sans capote ni kalachnikov	
2018	Lisa L'Heureux	Et si un soir	
2018	Alain Doom	Un quai entre deux mondes	
2018	Gilles Latour	À la merci de l’étoile	
2018	Yvon Malette	Entre le risque et le rêve	
2018	David Ménard	Poupée de rouille	
2019	Paul Ruban	Crevaison en corbillard	
2019	Jean Boisjoli	Moi, Sam, Elle, Janis	
2019	Claude Guilmain	AmericanDream.ca	
2019	Aristote Kavungu	Mon père, Boudarel et moi	
2020	Danièle Vallée	Sept nuits dans la vie de Chérie	
2020	Nicole V. Champeau	Niagara... la voie qui y mène	
2020	Daniel Castillo Durante	Tango	
2020	Charles-Étienne Ferland	Métamorphoses	
2020	Melchior Mbonimpa	Au sommet du Nanzerwé il s'est assis et il a pleuré	
2021	Robert Marinier	Un conte de l’apocalypse	
2021	Soufiane Chakkouche	Zahra	
2021	Marie-Hélène Larochelle	Je suis le courant la vase	
2021	Michèle Vinet	Le malaimant	
2021	Marie-Thé Morin	Errances	
2022	Gilles Lacombe	Circé des hirondelles	
2022	Andrée Lacelle	Dire	
2022	Gilles Latour	Feux du naufrage	
2022	Marie-Thé Morin	Frontières libres	
2022	Nancy Vickers	Capharnaum	
2023	Nicolas Weinberg	Vivre ou presque	
2023	Martin Bélanger	La fin de nos programmes	
2023	Andrée Christensen	Plonge, Freya, vole !	
2023	David Ménard	L'aurore martyrise l'enfant	
2023	Paul Ruban	Le parfum de la baleine	
2024	Aristote Kavungu	Céline au Congo	
2024	Marie-Hélène Larochelle	Toronto jamais bleue	
2024	Didier Leclair	Le prince africain, le traducteur et le nazi	
2024	Claire Ménard-Roussy	Un lourd prix à payer	
2024	Alex Tétreault	Nickel City Fifs: Une épopée queer sudburoise sur fond de trous	
2025	Sylvie Bérard	Mes morts jeunes	
2025	Maeva Guedjeu	Des silences et des murmures	
2025	Alain Bernard Marchand	Les visages de Rembrandt	
2025	Sarah Migneron	Maman bleue	
2025	Blaise Ndala	L’équation avant la nuit	

== Poetry or children's (2002-present) ==
Year	Author	Title	Ref
2002	Éric Charlebois	Faux-fuyants	
2002	Tina Charlebois	Tatouages et testaments	
2003	Angèle Bassolé-Ouédraogo	Avec tes mots	
2003	Marc LeMyre	Gaga pour ton zoom	
2004	No award presented		
2005	Éric Charlebois	Centrifuge	
2005	Joël Beddows	des planches à la palette	
2006	Françoise Lepage	Poupeska	
2006	Mireille Desjarlais-Heynneman	La nuit ou le Soleil est parti	
2006	Céline Forcier	Un canard majuscule	
2007	Tina Charlebois	Poils lisses	
2007	Christian Milat	Douleureuse aurore	
2008	Paul Prud'homme	Les Rebuts: Hockey 2	
2008	Michèle Laframboise	La quête de Chaaas tome 1	
2008	Françoise Lepage	Les chercheurs d'etoiles	
2009	Michèle Matteau	Passerelles	
2009	Jacqueline Borowick	Le chant du coucou	
2010	Daniel Marchildon	La première guerre de Toronto	
2010	Gilles Dubois	La piste sanglante	
2010	Sylvie Frigon	Ariane et son secret	
2010	Jean-Claude Larocque, Denis Sauvé	Etienne Brule: Le fils de Champlain	
2010	Aurélie Resch	Les Voleurs de couleurs	
2011	Sonia Lamontagne	À tire d’ailes	
2011	Francois Baril Pelletier	Apocryphes du coeur	
2011	Aurélie Resch	Cendres de lune	
2012	Claude Forand	Un moine trop bavard	
2012	Michèle Laframboise	Mica, fille de Transyl	
2012	Daniel Marchildon	Les guerriers de l'eau	
2013	Daniel Groleau Landry	Rêver au réel	
2013	Michèle Matteau	Le fol aujourd'hui	
2014	Micheline Marchand	Mauvaise mine	
2014	Diya Lim	Les enfants du ciel	
2014	Diya Lim	Larouspiol	
2015	David Ménard	Neuvaines	
2015	Sonia Lamontagne	Comptine a rebours	
2015	Gilles Latour	Mots qu'elle a faits terre	
2016	Pierre-Luc Belanger	Ski, Blanche et avalanche	
2016	Gilles Dubois	Nanuktalva	
2016	Daniel Marchildon	Zazette, la chatte des Ouendats	
2017	Sylvie Bérard	Oubliez	
2017	Chloé LaDuchesse	Furies	
2017	Christian Milat	Si je connaissais…	
2018	Diya Lim	La marchande, la sorcière, la lune et moi	
2018	Pierre-Luc Bélanger	L’Odyssée des neiges	
2018	Daniel Marchildon	Otages de la nature	
2019	Véronique Sylvain	Premier quart	
2019	Daniel Groleau Landry	Fragments de ciels	
2020	Éric Mathieu	Capitaine Boudu et les enfants de la Cédille	
2020	Marise Gasque	La Neva pour se retrouver	
2020	Micheline Marchand	Perdue au bord de la baie d'Hudson	
2021	Chloé LaDuchesse	Exosquelette	
2021	Sylvie Bérard	À croire que j’aime les failles	
2021	Sonia-Sophie Courdeau	Ce qui reste sans contour	
2022	Michèle Laframboise	Le secret de Paloma	
2022	Pierre-Luc Bélanger	Dany à la dérive	
2022	Hélène Koscielniak	Mégane et Mathis	
2023	No award presented		
2024	Mireille Messier	Le bonnet magique	
2024	Michèle Laframboise	Rose du désert	
2024	Eudes La Roche-Francoeur	Le roi Poubelle	
2025	Lisa L'Heureux	Haus	
2025	Noémie Roy	L'Épingle filante	
2025	Véronique Sylvain	En terrain miné	
