= Salon du livre de Toronto =

Canadian book fair

The Salon du livre de Toronto is an annual book fair in Toronto, Ontario, Canada, held to celebrate and publicize French language literature. Launched in 1993 as the first French language book fair in Canada outside Quebec, the event features a program of author readings, panel discussions and publisher exhibitions over the course of several days in the fall of each year. It concentrates primarily on Franco-Ontarian authors, although publishers and writers from Quebec and France also participate.

Due to the Franco-Ontarian community's relatively limited access to French language media and bookstores, it serves as an essential venue for promotion and networking between the publishing industry and French language school boards, post-secondary institutions, libraries and other community organizations in the province.

The event was founded by writer and educator Christine Dumitriu Van Saanen, who served as its director general until 2006.

== Awards ==
Since its inception, the event has presented an annual award to a work judged as the year's best work of French literature by a writer from Ontario. Initially named the Grand Prix du Salon du livre de Toronto, it was renamed the Prix Christine-Dumitriu-Van-Saanen in 1999 to honour the event's founder. The award was renamed the Prix Alain-Thomas in 2020, following the death of influential Franco-Ontarian academic Alain Thomas.

In 2017, the Salon du livre introduced the Prix Québec-Ontario, an award administered jointly with the Salon du livre de Rimouski in Quebec and presented to two writers, one from each province, who have published their first book. The winners in 2017 were Mishka Lavigne (Ontario) for Cinéma, and Christophe Bernard (Quebec) for La bête creuse. The award has not, however, been presented again in the years since 2017.

=== Grand Prix du Salon du livre de Toronto (1993-1998) ===
Year	Author	Title	Ref
1993	Daniel Poliquin		
1994	Gabrielle Poulin	Le livre de déraison	
1995	Maurice Henrie	Le balcon dans le ciel	
1996	Marguerite Andersen	La Soupe	
1996	Robert Fortin	Peut-il rêver celui qui s’endort dans la gueule des chiens	
1997	Andrée Christensen	Sacra Privata	
1998	René Dionne	Histoire de la littérature franco-ontarienne, des origines à nos jours	
1998	Hédi Bouraoui		

=== Prix Christine-Dumitriu-Van-Saanen (1999-2019) ===
Year	Author	Title	Ref
1999	Pierre Raphaël Pelletier	Il faut crier l'injure	
2000	Hédi Bouraoui	Ainsi parle la Tour CN	
2001	Gaétan Gervais	Les jumelles Dionne et l'Ontario français	
2002	Esther Beauchemin	Maïta	
2002	Nicole V. Champeau	Ô Saint-Laurent - Le fleuve à son commencement	
2002	Jean-Louis Grosmaire	Paris-New York	
2002	Michèle Matteau	Cognac et porto	
2002	Melchior Mbonimpa	Le totem des Baranda	
2003	Aristote Kavungu	Un Train pour l'Est	
2004	Franco Catanzariti	Sahel	
2004	Andrée Lacelle	La lumière et l'heure	
2004	Melchior Mbonimpa	Le dernier roi faiseur de pluie	
2005	Michèle Matteau	Un doigt de brandy dans un verre de lait chaud	
2006	Melchior Mbonimpa	Les morts ne sont pas les morts	
2007	Andrée Christensen	Depuis toujours j'entendais la mer	
2007	Maurice Henrie	Le chuchotement des étoiles	
2007	Hélène Koscielniak	Marraine	
2008	Antonio D'Alfonso	L'Aimé	
2008	Paul-François Sylvestre	Toronto s'écrit : la Ville Reine dans notre littérature	
2008	Michèle Matteau	Passerelles	
2009	Claude Tatilon	La Soupe au pistou	
2009	Jean Mohsen Fahmy	Frères ennemis	
2009	Claire Rochon	Fragments de Sifnos	
2010	Daniel Soha	L'Orchidiable	
2010	Daniel Castillo Durante	Ce feu si lent de l'exil	
2010	Françoise Lepage	Soudain l'étrangeté	
2011	Louis L'Allier	Les Danseurs de Kamilari	
2011	Claude Desmarais	Trois saisons	
2011	Joëlle Roy	Xman est back en Huronie	
2012	Gilles Dubois	L'Enfant qui ne pleurait jamais	
2012	Pierre Léon	Le Mariage politiquement correct du Petit Chaperon Rouge	
2012	Monia Mazigh	Miroir et mirages	
2013	Marie-Josée Martin	Un jour, ils entendront mes silences	
2013	Céline Forcier	La critique	
2013	Michel Thérien	La fluidité des heures	
2014	Andrée Christensen	Racines de neige	
2014	Jean Mohsen Fahmy	L’ultime voyage	
2014	Daniel Marchildon	Le sortilège de Louisbourg	
2015	Michel Dallaire	Violoncelle pour une lune d’automne	
2015	Hélène Koscielniak	Frédéric	
2015	Blaise Ndala	J'irai danser sur la tombe de Senghor	
2016	Didier Leclair	Pour l'amour de Dimitri	
2016	Marie Gingras	La poulette grise	
2016	Michèle Laframboise	L'Écologie d'Odi	
2017	Claude Guilmain	AmericanDream.ca	
2017	Gabriel Osson	Hubert, le restavèk	
2017	Paul-François Sylvestre	Ma jumelle m'a quitté dans la dignité	
2018	Daniel Soha	Chroniques tziganes : La légende de Joe Magarac	
2018	Michelle Deshaies	XieXie	
2018	Michel Thérien	Des vallées nous traversent	
2019	Jean Mohsen Fahmy	La Sultane dévoilée	
2019	Andrée Christensen	L'Isle aux abeilles noires	
2019	David Ménard	Poupée de rouille	
2020	Award not presented		

=== Prix Alain-Thomas (2021-present) ===
Year	Author	Title	Ref
2021	Gabriel Osson	Le jour se lèvera	
2021	Nicole V. Champeau	Niagara…la voie qui y mène	
2021	Éric Mathieu	Capitaine Boudu et les enfants de la Cédille	
2022	Janine Messadié	Lettre à Tahar Ben Jelloun	
2022	Soufiane Chakkouche	Zahra	
2022	Michèle Laframboise	Le secret de Paloma	
2023	Hélène Koscielniak	Mégane et Mathis	
2023	Elsie Suréna	Amours jaunies/Miscellanées	
2023	Nancy Vickers	Capharnaum	
2024	Jean Mohsen Fahmy	Par-delà les frontières	
2024	Roger Levac	L’odeur de l’oubli	
2024	Michèle Vinet	JAZ	
2025	Didier Leclair	Le prince africain, le traducteur et le nazi	
2025	Claire Ménard-Roussy	Un lourd prix à payer	
2025	Sherman Sezibera	La cité de Kali	
2026	Maeva Guedjeu	Des silences et des murmures	
2026	Marie-Thé Morin	Le volcan	
2026	Michel Thérien	L'Arbre qui nous Écrit	
