= Ottawa Book Award =

Canadian literary award

Ottawa Book Award and Prix du livre d'Ottawa is a Canadian literary award presented by the City of Ottawa to the best English and French language books written in the previous year by a living author residing in Ottawa. There are four awards each year: English fiction and non-fiction (the Ottawa Book Awards); French fiction and non-fiction (Prix du livre d'Ottawa). As of 2011 the four prize winners receive $7,500 each and short-listed authors $1,000 each. The award was founded in 1986. In its earlier years it was named the Ottawa-Carleton Book Awards.

From 1986 to 1990, only a single winner was named each year, with the prize alternating between non-fiction in even-numbered years and fiction in odd-numbered years. Beginning in 1991, separate awards were created for English and French literature, although the alternation between non-fiction and fiction titles each year continued until 2004; ever since, four awards have been presented annually for both English and French fiction and non-fiction. Despite being named as "fiction", however, the fiction category is also open to poetry titles.

Each category is presented only if the committee has received at least five eligible submissions within the appropriate eligibility period. If this benchmark is not reached, then no award is presented in that category; instead, any submissions that were received are forwarded for consideration in the following year, while the prize money is rolled back into the city's annual arts granting program. To date, only the French categories have ever been delayed in this manner, with the French non-fiction category impacted much more frequently than the French fiction category.

Although administered separately, the Archibald Lampman Award for poetry is also typically presented at the same time as the Ottawa Book Awards announcements.

== Winners ==
=== Fiction (1986-1990) ===
- 1987 - John Metcalf, Adult Entertainment
- 1989 - Maurice Henrie, La Chambre à mourir

=== Non-fiction (1986-1990) ===
- 1986 - Joan Finnigan, Legacies, Legends and Lies and Jean Bruce, Back the Attack! : Canadian Women During the Second World War
- 1988 - Patricia Morley, Kurelek: A Biography
- 1990 - Roy MacGregor, Chief: The Fearless Vision of Billy Diamond

=== English fiction (1991-present) ===
- 1991 - Rita Donovan, Dark Jewels
- 1993 - Rita Donovan, Daisy Circus and Nadine McInnis, The Litmus Body
- 1995 - John Barton, Notes Towards a Family Tree and Frances Itani, Man Without Face
- 1997 - Patrick Kavanagh, Gaff Topsails
- 1999 - Alan Cumyn, Man of Bone
- 2001 - Alan Cumyn, Burridge Unbound
- 2003 - Brian Doyle, Mary Ann Alice
- 2004 - Elizabeth Hay, Garbo Laughs
- 2005 - Frances Itani, Poached Egg on Toast
- 2006 - John-James Ford, Bonk on the Head and John Geddes, The Sundog Season
- 2007 - Janet Lunn, A Rebel's Daughter
- 2008 - Elizabeth Hay, Late Nights on Air
- 2009 - Andrew Steinmetz, Eva’s Threepenny Theatre
- 2010 - Craig Poile, True Concessions
- 2011 - Gabriella Goliger, Girl Unwrapped
- 2012 - Jamieson Findlay, The Summer of Permanent Wants
- 2013 - Missy Marston, The Love Monster
- 2014 - David O'Meara, A Pretty Sight
- 2015 - Scott Randall, And to Say Hello
- 2016 - Nadine McInnis, Delirium for Solo Harp
- 2017 - John Metcalf, The Museum at the End of the World
- 2018 - Shane Rhodes, Dead White Men
- 2019 - Kagiso Lesego Molope, This Book Betrays My Brother
- 2020 - Henry Beissel, Footprints of Dark Energy
- 2021 - Conyer Clayton, We Shed Our Skin Like Dynamite
- 2022 - David O'Meara, Masses on Radar
- 2023 - Jean Van Loon, Nuclear Family
- 2024 - Sandra Ridley, Vixen
- 2025 - Nina Berkhout, This Bright Dust

=== English non-fiction (1991-present) ===
- 1992 - John Sawatsky, Mulroney: The Politics of Ambition
- 1994 - Penelope Williams, That Other Place: A Personal Account of Breast Cancer
- 1996 - Clyde Sanger, Malcolm MacDonald: Bringing an End to Empire
- 1998 - Isaac Vogelfanger, Red Tempest
- 2000 - Roy MacGregor, A Life in the Bush: Lessons From My Father
- 2002 - Anna Heilman, Never Far Away
- 2004 - Madelaine Drohan, Making a Killing: How and Why Corporations Use Armed Force to Do Business
- 2005 - Valerie Knowles, From Telegrapher to Titan: The Life of William C. Van Horne
- 2006 - Heather Menzies, No Time: Stress and the Crisis of Modern Life
- 2007 - Charlotte Gray, Reluctant Genius: The Passionate Life and Inventive Mind of Alexander Graham Bell
- 2008 - Tim Cook, At the Sharp End: Canadians Fighting the Great War 1914-1916
- 2009 - Kerry Pither, Dark Days: The Story of Four Canadians Tortured in the Name of Fighting Terror
- 2010 - Andrew Horrall, Bringing Art to Life: a Biography of Alan Jarvis
- 2011 - Eric Enno Tamm, The Horse that Leaps Through Clouds
- 2012 - Ruth B. Phillips, Museum Pieces: Toward the Indigenization of Canadian Museums
- 2013 - Michael Petrou, Is This Your First War? Travels through the Post - 9/11 Islamic World
- 2014 - Paul Wells, The Longer I'm Prime Minister: Stephen Harper and Canada, 2006
- 2015 - Heather Menzies, Reclaiming the Commons for the Common Good
- 2016 - Tim Cook, Fight to the Finish: Canadians in the Second World War, 1944-1945
- 2017 - Charlotte Gray, The Promise of Canada: 150 Years - People and Ideas that Have Shaped our Country
- 2018 - Roy MacGregor, Original Highways: Travelling the Great Rivers of Canada
- 2019 - Tim Cook, The Secret History of Soldiers: How Canadians Survived the Great War
- 2020 - Beverley McLachlin, Truth Be Told: My Journey Through Life and the Law
- 2021 - Suzanne Evans, The Taste of Longing: Ethel Mulvany and Her Starving Prisoners of War Cookbook
- 2022 - Fen Osler Hampson and Mike Blanchfield, The Two Michaels: Innocent Canadian Captives and High Stakes Espionage in the US-China Cyber War
- 2023 - Tim Cook, Lifesavers and Body Snatchers: Medical Care and the Struggle for Survival in the Great War
- 2024 - Huda Mukbil, Agent of Change: My life Fighting Terrorists, Spies and Institutional Racism
- 2025 - Denise Chong, Out of Darkness: Rumana Monzur's Journey through Betrayal, Tyranny and Abuse

=== French fiction (1991-present) ===
- 1991 - Daniel Poliquin, Visions de Jude
- 1993 - Maurice Henrie, Le Pont sur le temps and Gabrielle Poulin, Petites fugues pour une saison sèche
- 1995 - Andrée Christensen, Noces d’ailleurs
- 1997 - Maurice Henrie, Le Balcon dans le ciel
- 1999 - Pierre Raphaël Pelletier, Il faut crier l’injure
- 2001 - Nicole V. Champeau, Dans les pas de la louve and Michèle Matteau, Quatuor pour cordes sensibles
- 2003 - Jean Mohsen Fahmy, Ibn Kaldoun: l'honneur et la disgrâce and Nancy Vickers, La Petite Vieille aux poupées
- 2004 - Maurice Henrie, Mémoire Vive
- 2005 - Maurice Henrie, Les roses et le verglas and Michel Thérien, L’aridité des fleuves
- 2006 - Gilles Lacombe, Trafiquante de lumière
- 2007 - Daniel Poliquin, La Kermesse
- 2008 - Andrée Christensen, Depuis toujours, j’entendais la mer
- 2009 - Margaret Michèle Cook, Chronos à sa table de travail
- 2010 - Claire Rochon, Fragments de Sifnos
- 2011 - not awarded
- 2012 - Estelle Beauchamp, Un souffle venu de loin
- 2013 - Marie-Josée Martin, Un jour, ils entendront mes silences
- 2014 - not awarded
- 2015 - Blaise Ndala, J’irai danser sur la tombe de Senghor
- 2016 - Pierre-Luc Landry, Les corps extraterrestres
- 2017 - Andrée Christensen, Épines d'encre
- 2018 - Alain Bernard Marchand, Sept vies, dix-sept morts
- 2019 - Andrée Christensen, L'Isle aux abeilles noires
- 2020 - Véronique Sylvain, Premier quart
- 2021 - Monia Mazigh, Farida
- 2022 - Michèle Vinet, Le Malaimant
- 2023 - Nancy Vickers, Capharnaüm
- 2024 - Sébastien Pierroz, Deux heures avant la fin de l’été

=== French non-fiction (1991-present) ===
- 1992 - not awarded
- 1994 - Gilberte Paquette, Dans le sillage d’Élizabeth Bruyère
- 1996 - Elisabeth J. Lacelle, L’incontournable échange. Conversations oecuméniques et pluridisciplinaires
- 1998 - René Dionne, Histoire de la Littérature Franco-Ontarienne des origines à nos jours
- 2000 - Patricia Smart, Les femmes du Refus Global
- 2002 - Françoise Lepage, Histoire de la littérature pour la jeunesse
- 2004 - Mila Younes, Ma mère, ma fille, ma sœur
- 2005 - not awarded
- 2006 - Réjean Robidoux, D’éloge et de critique
- 2007 - not awarded
- 2008 - not awarded
- 2009 - Maurice Henrie, Esprit de sel
- 2010 - not awarded
- 2011 - Lucie Joubert, L’envers du landau
- 2012 - not awarded
- 2013 - not awarded
- 2014 - Philippe Bernier Arcand, La dérive populiste
- 2015 - not awarded
- 2016 - Patricia Smart, De Marie de l'Incarnation à Nelly Arcan
- 2017 - not awarded
- 2018 - not awarded
- 2019 - Yvon Malette, Entre le risque et le rêve : Une brève histoire des Éditions David
- 2020 - not awarded
- 2021 - Nicole V. Champeau, Niagara…la voie qui y mène
- 2022 - not awarded
- 2023 - Maurice Henrie, La tête haute
- 2024 - not awarded
