= Prise de parole =

Éditions Prise de parole
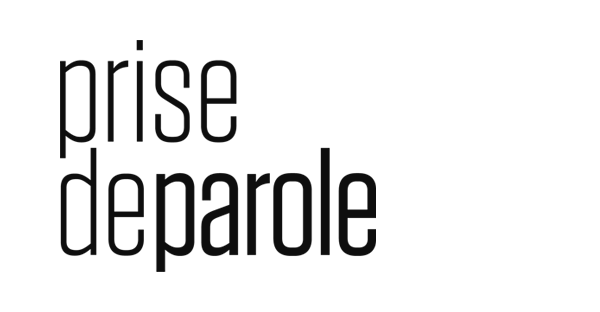
- Status: Active
- Founded: May 5, 1973
- Founder: Coopérative des artistes du Nouvel-Ontario
- Country of origin: Canada
- Headquarters location: Place des Arts, Greater Sudbury, Ontario, Canada
- Key people: Sonya Malaborza (Co-CEO); Stéphane Cormier (Co-CEO)
- Publication types: Books
- Official website: prisedeparole.ca

Éditions Prise de parole (English: Speaking Out Publications) is a publishing house in Greater Sudbury, Ontario, Canada. Prise de parole publishes Francophone literature, primarily but not exclusively by Franco-Ontarian authors. As of 2022, Prise de parole is located in Place des Arts, a francophone arts centre in downtown Sudbury.

== History ==
The publishing house was established in 1973 by Coopérative des artistes du Nouvel-Ontario, a group of professors and students at Laurentian University. Its first book, released in 1973, was Lignes Signes, an anthology of poetry by Jean Lalonde, Placide Gaboury, Denis St-Jules and Gaston Tremblay. Its first fiction title was Hermaphrodismes, two erotic novellas written by Fernand Dorais under the pen name "Tristan Lafleur".

Their most successful title is Doric Germain's novel La vengeance de l'orignal. In 1996, the firm was involved in the Federal Court of Canada case Prise de parole Inc. v Guérin, éditeur Ltée. after another publishing company published unauthorized excerpts from La vengeance de l'orignal in an anthology for use in schools. The case awarded Germain $10,000 in compensation but found that Guérin's actions were not an infringement on Germain's moral rights as the excerpts were not damaging to his reputation, is now considered a key precedent in the matter of moral rights in Canadian copyright law.

== Authors ==
- Herménégilde Chiasson
- Jean-Marc Dalpé
- Fernand Dorais
- Doric Germain
- Fernand Ouellet
- Daniel Poliquin
- Patrice Desbiens
- Michel Bock
- Marguerite Andersen
- Robert Marinier
- Melchior Mbonimpa
- Maurice Henrie
- Hélène Brodeur
- Franco Catanzariti
- Estelle Beauchamp
- Robert Dickson

Additionally, Prise de parole has published French translations of English works by Charlie Angus, Phil Hall, Matthew Heiti and Tomson Highway.

== Awards ==
- Governor General's Award for French-language drama, Le Chien, Jean-Marc Dalpé, 1988
- Governor General's Award for French-language drama, Il n'y a que l'amour, Jean-Marc Dalpé, 1999
- Governor General's Award for French-language poetry, Conversations, Herménégilde Chiasson, 1999
- Governor General's Award for French-language fiction, Un vent se lève qui éparpille, Jean-Marc Dalpé, 2000
- Governor General's Award for French-language poetry, Humains paysages en temps de paix relative, Robert Dickson, 2002
