= Sylvie Bérard =

Canadian academic and science fiction writer

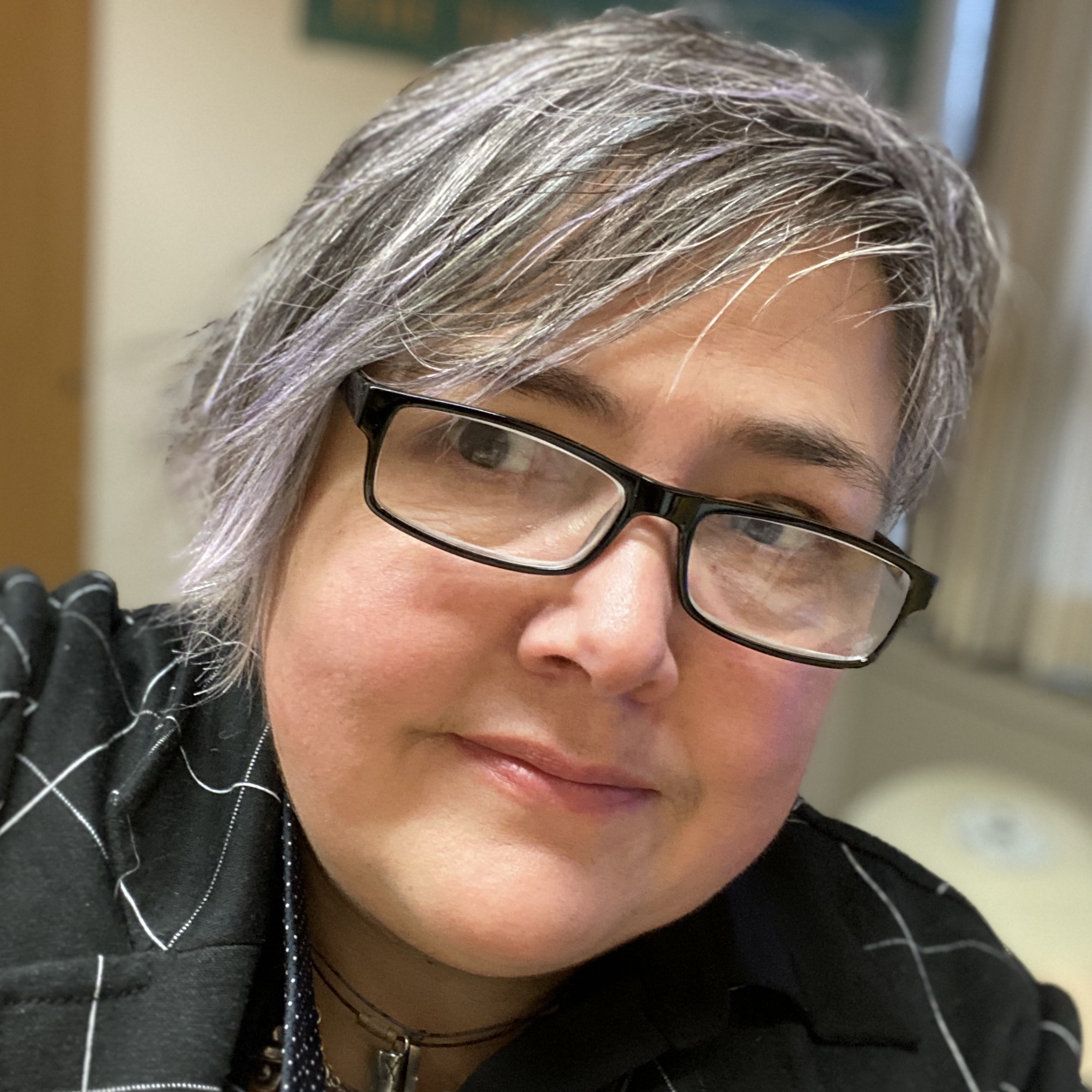
Sylvie Bérard

Sylvie Bérard (born 1965) is a Canadian academic and science fiction writer.

Born in Montreal, she studied semiotics at the Université du Québec à Montréal and went on to lecture for the Department of French and perform post-doctoral research at the University of Toronto. She later lectured on Quebec literature at Trent University; she also was director of the Department of languages and modern literature.

Bérard began publishing short stories in 1987. Her short story "La Guerre sans temps" received a Prix Aurora Award. She has published articles in a number of scholarly journals. She is also a member of the editorial board for the journal XYZ.

She has also worked as a translator. With colleague Suzanne Grenier, she won the Governor General's Award for English to French translation at the 2025 Governor General's Awards for Les sœurs de la muée, their translation of Larissa Lai's novel The Tiger Flu. They were previously nominated in the same category at the 2022 Governor General's Awards for Le fruit de la puanteur, their translation of Lai's Salt Fish Girl.

She is queer.

She was shortlisted for the Trillium Book Award for French Prose in 2026 for Mes morts jeunes.

== Selected works ==
- Elle meurt à la fin, novel (1993) with Brigitte Caron
- Les 50 romans d'amour qu'il faut lire (1996) with Julia Bettinotti and Gaëlle Jeanneson
- Terre des Autres (2004), translated as Of Wind and Sand (2009), received the Prix des lecteurs de Radio-Canada
- La Saga d'Illyge (2011), nominated for an Aurora award
