= Robert Marinier =

Canadian stage actor, playwright and television writer (born 1954

- Born: 1954 (age 71–72); Sudbury, Ontario, Canada
- Occupations: Actor, dramatist, television writer
- Writing career
- Period: 1980s – present
- Notable works: L'Insomnie, Météo+

Robert Marinier (born 1954 in Sudbury, Ontario) is a Canadian stage actor, playwright and television writer.

He was a nominee for the Governor General's Award for French-language drama at the 1997 Governor General's Awards for his play L'Insomnie. For the same play, he was also a Dora Mavor Moore Award nominee for Best Actor in a Play, Mid-Size Theatre division, in 1997.

His 2021 book Un conte de l'apocalypse was the winner of the Trillium Book Award for French Prose in 2022.

He has also been a television writer for the series The Smoggies, Météo+ and Les Bleus de Ramville.

== Personal life ==
Marinier attended high school at École secondaire Macdonald-Cartier.

== Plays ==
- 1979 - Lafortune et Lachance
- 1980 - La Tante
- 1982 - L'Inconception
- 1984 - Les Rogers (with Robert Bellefeuille and Jean-Marc Dalpé)
- 1988 - En camisoles
- 1989 - Deuxième souffle (with Dan Lalande)
- 1993 - À la gauche de Dieu
- 1994 - L'Insomnie
- 1997 - But for the Grace of God... (English translation of À la gauche de Dieu)
- 1999 - Le golfeur et la mort
- 1999 - Contes sudburois (with Jean-Marc Dalpé, Robert Dickson, Paulette Gagnon, Michael Gauthier and Brigitte Haentjens)
- 2000 - Big Crunch
- 2000 - Univers
- 2000 - Je me souviens
- 2005 - Épinal
