= Nathanaël =

Canadian writer, literary translator and educator

- Born: Nathalie Stephens; 1970 (age 55–56); Montreal, Quebec
- Occupations: writer, translator, educator
- Writing career
- Notable works: ...s'arrête? Je (2007), Underground (1999)

Nathanaël (born 1970 in Montreal) is a Canadian writer, literary translator and educator. Some of her works have been published under her legal name Nathalie Stephens. She lives in Chicago.

== Biography ==
In 1970 Nathanaël was born as Nathalie Stephens in Montreal. She studied Literature at the Lumière University Lyon 2 and the York University, Toronto. Since 2002 she is member of the Québec Union of Writers. She teaches at the School of the Art Institute of Chicago. Furthermore, she is a contributing editor to the French online magazine Recours au poème and the American magazine Aufgabe.

Nathanaël writes intergenre, poetry, prose, and essays — in English and French — which have been translated into Bulgarian, Basque, Greek, Portuguese, Slovenian and Spanish. Her book Underground was finalist for a Grand Prix du Salon du livre de Toronto in 2000. L'injure was shortlisted for a Prix Trillium and the Prix Alain-Grandbois in 2005. ...s'arrête? Je won the Prix Alain-Grandbois in 2008.

Nathanaël has translated John Keene, Trish Salah, Reginald Gibbons, Bhanu Kapil, R. M. Vaughan et al. into French and Hervé Guibert, Danielle Collobert, Hilda Hilst, Édouard Glissant and Catherine Mavrikakis into English. Her translation of Danielle Collobert's novel Murder was shortlisted for a Best Translated Book Award 2014. She has been awarded with fellowships from the PEN American Center (2012) and the Centre national du livre de France (2013) for her translation of Hervé Guibert's The Mausoleum of Lovers.

== Selected writings ==
- The Middle Notebooks. New York: Nightboat, 2015 ISBN 978-1-937658-38-0.
- Asclepias The Milkweeds. New York: Nightboat, 2015 ISBN 978-1-937658-39-7.
- Laisse. Paris: Recours au poème éditeurs, 2015 ISBN 978-2-37226-025-1.
- Sotto l'immagine. Montréal: Mémoire d'encrier, 2014 ISBN 978-2897122461.
- Sisyphus, Outdone. Theatres of the Catastrophal. New York: Nightboat, 2013 ISBN 978-1-937658-05-2.
- Carnet de délibérations. Montréal: Le Quartanier, 2011 ISBN 978-2923400853.
- We Press Ourselves Plainly. New York: Nightboat, 2010 ISBN 978-0-9844598-0-3.
- Vigilous, Reel. Desire (a)s accusation. San Francisco: Albion, 2010.
- Carnet de désaccords. Montréal: Le Quartanier, 2009 ISBN 978-2923400501.
- At Alberta. Toronto: BookThug, 2008 ISBN 978-1897388242.
- ...s'arrête? Je. Montréal: Éditions de l'Hexagone, 2007 ISBN 978-2890067929.
- The Sorrow And The Fast Of It. New York: Nightboat Books, 2007 ISBN 978-0-9767185-5-0.
- L'absence au lieu (Claude Cahun et le livre inouvert). Québec: Nota Bene, 2007 ISBN 978-2895182641.
- Touch To Affliction. Toronto: Coach House Books, 2006 ISBN 978-1552451755.
- L'injure. Montréal: Éditions de l'Hexagone, 2004 ISBN 978-2890067189.
- Paper City. A caprice on the subject of disillusionment. Toronto: Coach House Books, 2003 ISBN 978-1552451267.
- Je Nathanaël. Montréal: L'Hexagone, 2003 ISBN 978-2890066960.
- L'embrasure. Laval: Éditions TROIS, 2002 ISBN 978-2895160335.
- All Boy. Calgary: housepress, 2001 ISBN 1894174348.
- Somewhere Running. Vancouver: Arsenal Pulp Press, 2000 ISBN 978-1551520896.
- Underground. Laval: Éditions TROIS, 1999 ISBN 978-2895160021.
- Colette m'entends-tu? Laval: Éditions TROIS, 1997 ISBN 978-2920887855.
- This Imagined Permanence. Toronto: Gutter Press, 1996 ISBN 978-1896356051.
- hivernale. Toronto: Éditions du GREF, 1995 ISBN 978-0921916680.

=== Translations ===
- Édouard Glissant, Sun of Consciousness. New York: Nightboat, 2020 ISBN 978-1937658953.
- Hervé Guibert, The Mausoleum of Lovers Journals 1976–1991. New York: Nightboat 2014, ISBN 978-1-937658-22-9.
- Danielle Collobert, Murder. New York: Litmus Press, 2013 ISBN 978-1933959177.
- Hilda Hilst, The Obscene Madame D. New York: Nightboat, 2014 ISBN 978-1-937658-06-9 (with Rachel Gontijo Araújo).
- Édouard Glissant, Poetic Intention. New York: Nightboat, 2010 ISBN 978-0-9822645-3-9.
- Catherine Mavrikakis, Flowers of Spit. BookThug, 2011 ISBN 978-1897388884.
- Catherine Mavrikakis, A Cannibal and Melancholy Mourning. Coach House, 2004 ISBN 978-1552451403.

== Awards and recognition ==
- 2013 Residential bursary from the Collège International de Traducteurs Littéraires (Arles)
- 2013 Bursary from the Centre national du livre
- 2012 PEN Translation Fund Fellowship
- 2008 Prix Alain-Grandbois for ...s'arrête? Je
- 2003 British Centre for Literary Translation Residential Bursary of the University of East Anglia
- 2002 Chalmers Fellowship
