= Daniel Castillo Durante =

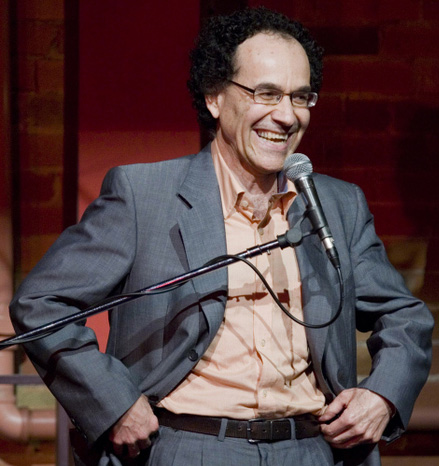
Daniel Castillo Durante

Daniel Castillo Durante is an Argentine-Quebecois author and a professor at the University of Ottawa. He was cowinner with Paul Savoie of the Trillium Book Award for French-language work in 2006, for his book La Passion des nomades.
