= Mireille Messier =

Canadian children's writer

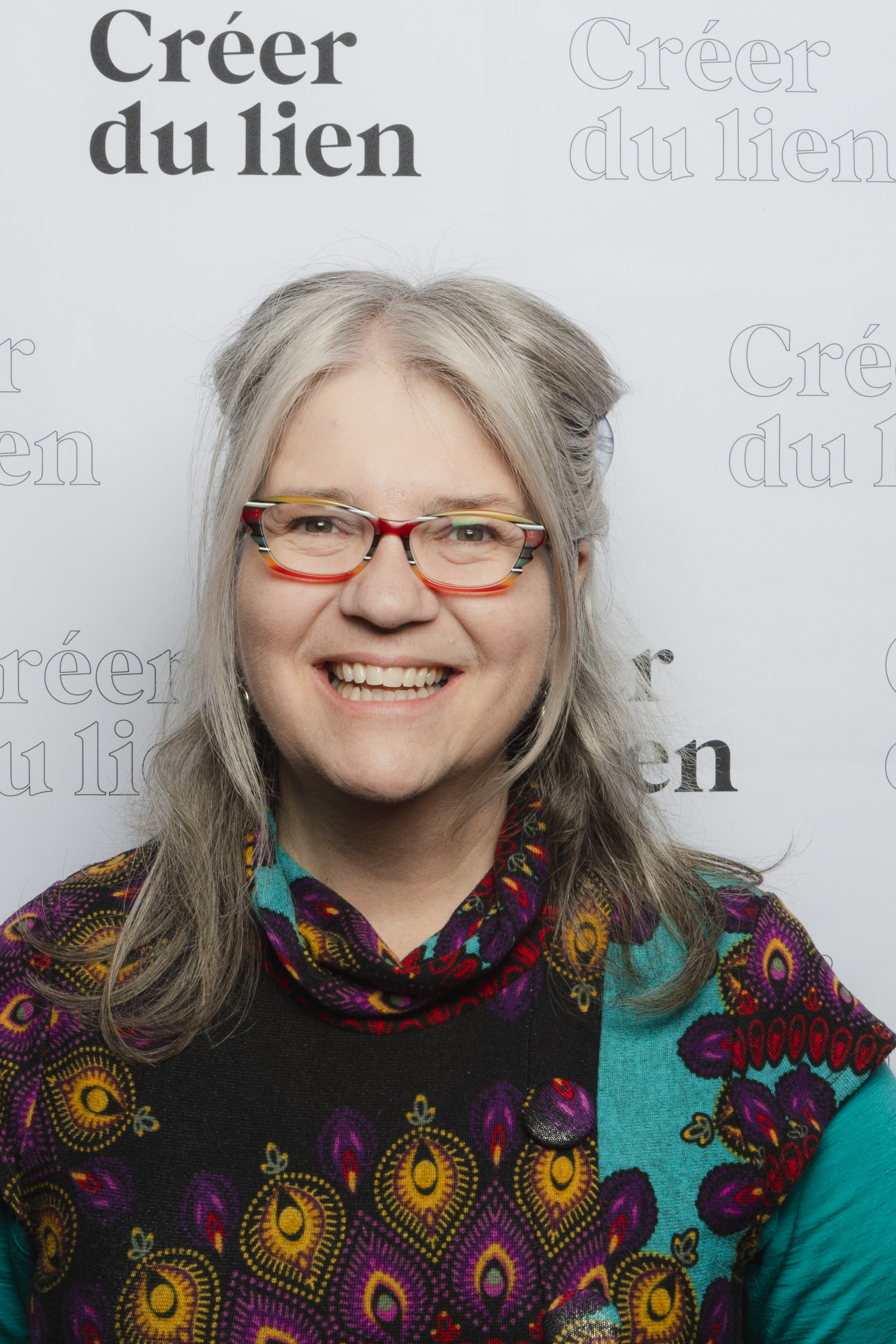
- Born: March 19, 1971 (age 55); Montreal, Quebec, Canada
- Occupations: Children's writer, journalist
- Writing career
- Period: 1990s–present
- Notable works: The Magic Cap, The Branch

Mireille Messier (born March 19, 1971) is a Canadian writer of children's literature, who has published work in both English and French. She is most noted for her 2016 book The Branch, which was a Governor General's Literary Award finalist for English language Young People's Literature - Illustrated Books at the 2016 Governor General's Awards, and her 2023 book The Magic Cap (Le bonnet magique), which won the Trillium Book Award for French children's literature in 2025.

Born in Montreal, Quebec, and raised in Ottawa, Ontario, she worked in radio in her early career, including stints as director of French programming at CHUO-FM in Ottawa, and as a radio host on CHOD-FM in Cornwall. She moved to Toronto in 1995, working for TFO as a researcher and reporter for programs such as Panorama and Méga TFO, before publishing her first children's book in 1999.

She has written and published both illustrated picture books for young children and a series of short novels for middle grade readers which centre on Viviane and Simon, young amateur detectives who travel around Ontario solving local mysteries.

== Works ==
- Mirouille raconte… 7 jours en contes - 1999
- Competition : Deal With It From Start to Finish - 2004
- Tous les oeufs dans le même panier - 2007
- Night Flight (Luca Pirate-joueur-de-hockey-archéologue-chevalier) - 2008
- Une Charlotte au chocolat - 2008
- Quel fouillis! - 2009
- Chapeau Charlotte! - 2010
- Tout un méli-mélo! - 2012
- Charlotte partout! - 2012
- C’est chouette, une maman! - 2013
- Quand les zéros deviennent héros - 2013
- Embrouilles à Embrun - 2013
- Une Charlotte olympique - 2014
- La salade de César - 2014
- Le voilier d’Olivier – une aventure en anagrammes - 2014
- Une bestiole à l’école - 2016
- The Branch - 2016
- Fatima and the Clementine Thieves (Fatima et les voleurs de clémentines) - 2017
- Moi aussi! Moi aussi! - 2017
- Whose Egg Is This? (À qui le coco?) - 2018
- So Wild! (Tellement sauvage!) - 2018
- Sergeant Billy: The True Story of the Goat Who Went to War (Sergent Billy : La vraie histoire du chevreau devenu soldat) - 2019
- Treasure (Trésor) - 2019
- Nutcracker Night (La magie de Casse-Noisette) - 2019
- Je déteste les moustiques, mais... - 2022
- Tom-Aime-Tout - 2022
- Star: The Bird Who Inspired Mozart - 2022
- The Magic Cap (Le bonnet magique) - 2023
- No Horses in the House!: The Audicious Life of Artist Rosa Bonheur (Pas de chevaux dans la maison!) - 2023
- Une Twiga à Ottawa! - 2024
- Déclic à Toronto - 2024
- Coupe et soucoupe à Sudbury - 2024
- Nevin Knows (Ce que Samuel sait) - 2025
- Coup de théâtre à Stratford - 2025
