= Eliza Clark (Canadian author) =

Canadian writer

- Born: May 22, 1963 (age 62); Toronto, Ontario
- Occupation: Novelist

Eliza Clark (born May 22, 1963) is a Canadian writer.

Born in Mississauga outside Toronto, Ontario, she received a Bachelor of Fine Arts from York University in 1985 and graduated from Banff School of Fine Arts in 1988. Before writing full time Clark worked in television as an editor and producer. Clark has also taught creative writing at Ryerson University, the Humber School for Writers and York University. In 2007, she published, Writer's Gym, which collected tips for writers from various authors including Douglas Coupland and Margaret Atwood.

== Bibliography ==
- Miss You Like Crazy, 1991.
- What You Need, 1994.
- Butterflies and Bottlecaps, 1996.
- Seeing and Believing, 1999, with Vladyana Langer Krykorka.
- Bite the Stars: A Novel, 2000.
- Writer's Gym: Exercises and Training Tips for Writers, 2007

== Awards ==
- Short listed, Trillium Book Award, for Miss You Like Crazy, 1991.
- Short listed, Stephen Leacock Memorial Medal for Humour, for Miss You Like Crazy, 1992.
- Short listed, Giller Prize, for What You Need, 1994.
