= Nicolas Weinberg =

French-Canadian writer (born 1967)

Nicolas Weinberg (born 1967) is a French/Canadian writer, whose debut short story collection Vivre ou presque won the Trillium Book Award for French prose in 2024.

Born in Paris, Weinberg moved to Toronto, Ontario, in 2006, and has worked as a journalist and translator. After publishing a number of short stories in literary magazines, he published Vivre ou presque through L'Interligne in 2023.
