= Alex Tétreault =

Canadian writer and activist

Alex Tétreault (born 1994) is a Canadian writer and activist from Greater Sudbury, Ontario, who has been the city's poet laureate since 2024.

He attended high school at École secondaire Macdonald-Cartier, where he was associated with the Les Draveurs theatre troupe, and later studied in the theatre program at Laurentian University. He was subsequently a communications and marketing manager for the Théâtre du Nouvel-Ontario, who awarded him a $2,500 grant in 2019 toward the creation of his first original stage play. During this era, he also served as chair of Sudbury Pride until 2021.

His play, Nickel City Fifs : Une épopée queer sudburoise sur fond de trous, premiered in 2023 with a performance at Zig's, the city's gay bar. An English version of the play, Sudbury Saturgay Night, also received a reading at the 2023 PlaySmelter festival.

It undertook a wider tour of markets throughout Ontario in 2025, and its print publication received a Trillium Book Award nomination for French Prose in 2025.

His second stage play, Avert Your Gays, debuted at the 2024 PlaySmelter festival.
