= Aurélie Resch =

Canadian writer and filmmaker

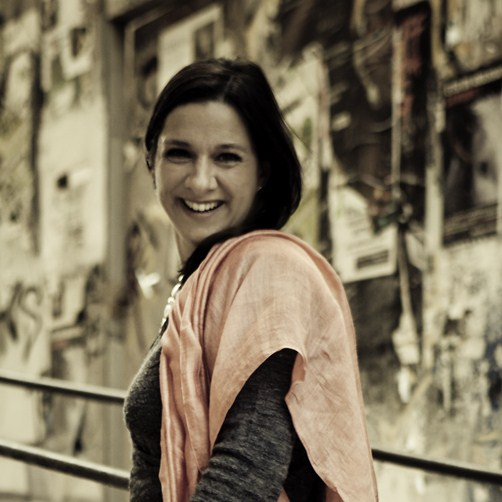
- Aurélie Resch, Marseilles, France 2011
- Born: Toronto, Ontario, Canada
- Occupations: Writer, travel writer and filmmaker
- Website: www.aurelieresch.com

Aurélie Resch is an author, travel writer and filmmaker from Toronto, Ontario, Canada.

== Biography ==
Resch has written eight books and has written in many collectives. Her work on exile and the quest of identity led her to be a finalist in 2002 and 2005 to the CBC Readers Awards and the Christine Dumitriu Van Saanen Literary Award. In 2011, her book for children "Les voleurs de couleurs" was nominated to the Trillium Book Award, as was her first compilation of poetry "Cendres de lune" in 2012.

Resch is also a travel writer. Her credits include L'Express de Toronto, the Toronto Star, Metro News Canada, TravelLife magazine, Dabble, Dreamscapes Travel and Lifetime Magazine, La Presse, Châtelaine and MSN. She also contributes to literary and cultural magazines in Quebec and Ontario, Canada, and directs films for French Canadian television. Resch gives writing workshops in French and bilingual schools and universities, and is a guest speaker in literary festivals and events in Canada and in France. This body of work to promote French culture and literature was acknowledged in 2008 when Resch was nominated to the Trophées du [Sénat Français].

Since 2005, Resch has been working on literary juries for Canadian Council for the Arts, Ontario Arts Council, Ontario Media Development Corporation and Canadian Broadcasting Corporation.

Resch has worked on the Board of l'Association des Auteurs de l'Ontario Français from 2007 to 2011. She is a member of several associations: Association des Auteurs de l'Ontario Français (AAOF), The Writers' Union of Canada, Conseil International d'Études Francophones (CIEF), Travel Media Association of Canada (TMAC), North America Travel Journalists Association (NATJA), Association des Journalistes du Tourisme (AJT), and Women in Film and Television (WIFT).

== Works ==
=== Novels ===
- Pars, Ntangu!, Éditions David (2011)

=== Short stories ===
- La Dernière Allumette, Éditions David (2011)
- Le bonheur est une couleur, Éditions de l'Interligne (2008)
- Obsessions, Éditions de l'Interligne (2005)
- Les yeux de l'exil, Éditions Le Nordir (2002)

=== Poetry ===
- Pas ici, pas d'ailleurs – Froissements, Anthologie poétique francophone de voix féminines contemporaines, Voix d'encre (2011)
- Cendres de lune, Éditions L'Harmattan (2010)
- "Je te regarde", Haïti, je t'aime, Éditions Le Vermillon (2010)

=== Books for children ===
- Les voleurs de couleurs, Éditions de l'Interligne (2010)
- Les jardins de Carmella, Histoires d'amitiés, Éditions Le Vermillon (2009)
- Contes de la rivière Severn, Éditions Le Vermillon (2005)

== Filmography ==
- Sodade, short film, Eolia Productions (2010)
- Scattered Identity, 52-min documentary, Télé-Québec, Les Productions des Collines (2007)
- Les Héroïnes de l'ombre, 30-min documentary, Productions Médiatique, NFB, Téléfilm Canada, Canadian Television Fund (2005)
- Fort Severn, documentary project with the National Film Board (2002)

== Distinctions ==
- North American Travel Journalists Association, Silver Medal (2015) section Byline travel column - Greater than 250,000 circulation for "Under the Sea in a Galapagos Game of yellow-flippered tag", Metro News Canada
- North American Travel Journalists Association, Silver Medal (2015) section Byline travel column - Less than 250,000 circulation for "Wadi Rum, Land of Lawrence", Travelife Magazine
- North American Travel Journalists Association, Bronze Medal (2015) section Byline travel column - Greater than 250,000 circulation for "The Big Easy: Where life is a little slower", Metro News Toronto
- Nominated to the North American Travel Journalists Awards (2015) section Byline travel column - Less than 250,000 circulation for "On a Quest to see the Yukon's Night Show", Travelife Magazine
- Nominated to the North American Travel Journalists Association award (2014) section Destination Travel - International Newspaper, for the article In the Cook Islands, Maori tales weave a spell, Toronto Star
- Union Méditerranéenne du Cinéma et de la Video award (2013) for her short film Sodade, making it a nominee to the national Festival national du court-métrage de Bourges (26-29 septembre 2013)
- North American Travel Journalist Association, Bronze medal (2013), section Destination Travel, Domestic Newspaper - Less than 250 000 circulation for story MY TORONTO, L'Express de Toronto
- Travel Media Association of Canada award (2013) best French language feature
- Cendres de lune, nominated to Trillium Book Award (2012)
- Les voleurs de couleurs, nominated to Trillium Book Award (2011)
- Runner-up to the Trophées du Sénat Français (2008)
- Obsessions, nominated to the CBC Readers' Award (2005)
- Les yeux de l'exil, nominated to the CBC Readers' Award (2003)
- Les yeux de l'exil, nominated to the Christine Dumitriu Van Saanen Literary Award (2003)
