= Lola Lemire Tostevin =

Canadian poet and novelist (born 1937)

- Born: June 15, 1937 (age 89); Timmins, Ontario, Canada
- Occupations: Poet; novelist; biographer

Lola Lemire Tostevin (born June 15, 1937 in Timmins, Ontario) is a Canadian poet, novelist and biographer. Although not widely known among the general public, she is one of Canada's leading feminist writers, and a prominent figure in Canadian literary analysis.

Despite being Franco-Ontarian, born of French-speaking parents and with French as her first language, Tostevin writes primarily in English. She has, however, published work in French as well, and has translated several notable Canadian authors, both English and French, for publication in the other language.

Her work often deals with international themes, and is similar in this way to Hédi Bouraoui.

== Bibliography ==
- Color of Her Speech (1982)
- Gyno Text (1983)
- Double Standards (1985)
- Sophie (1988)
- La danse éliminatoire (1991, translation of Michael Ondaatje's Elimination Dance)
- Frog Moon (1994, novel)
- Cartouches (1995)
- Subject to Criticism (1995, essays)
- Day Has No Equal But the Night (1997, translation of Le Jour n'a d'égal que la nuit by Anne Hébert)
- The Jasmine Man (2001, novel)
- Site-Specific Poems (2004)
- Punctum (2007)
- The other sister (2008, novel)
- "Singed Wings" (2013, poems)
- "At the Risk of Sounding" (2015 essays)
- Who Is Kim Ondaatje? The Inventive Life of a Canadian Artist (2023 biography)

== See also ==
- List of French Canadian writers from outside Quebec.
