= Blaise Ndala =

Canadian writer

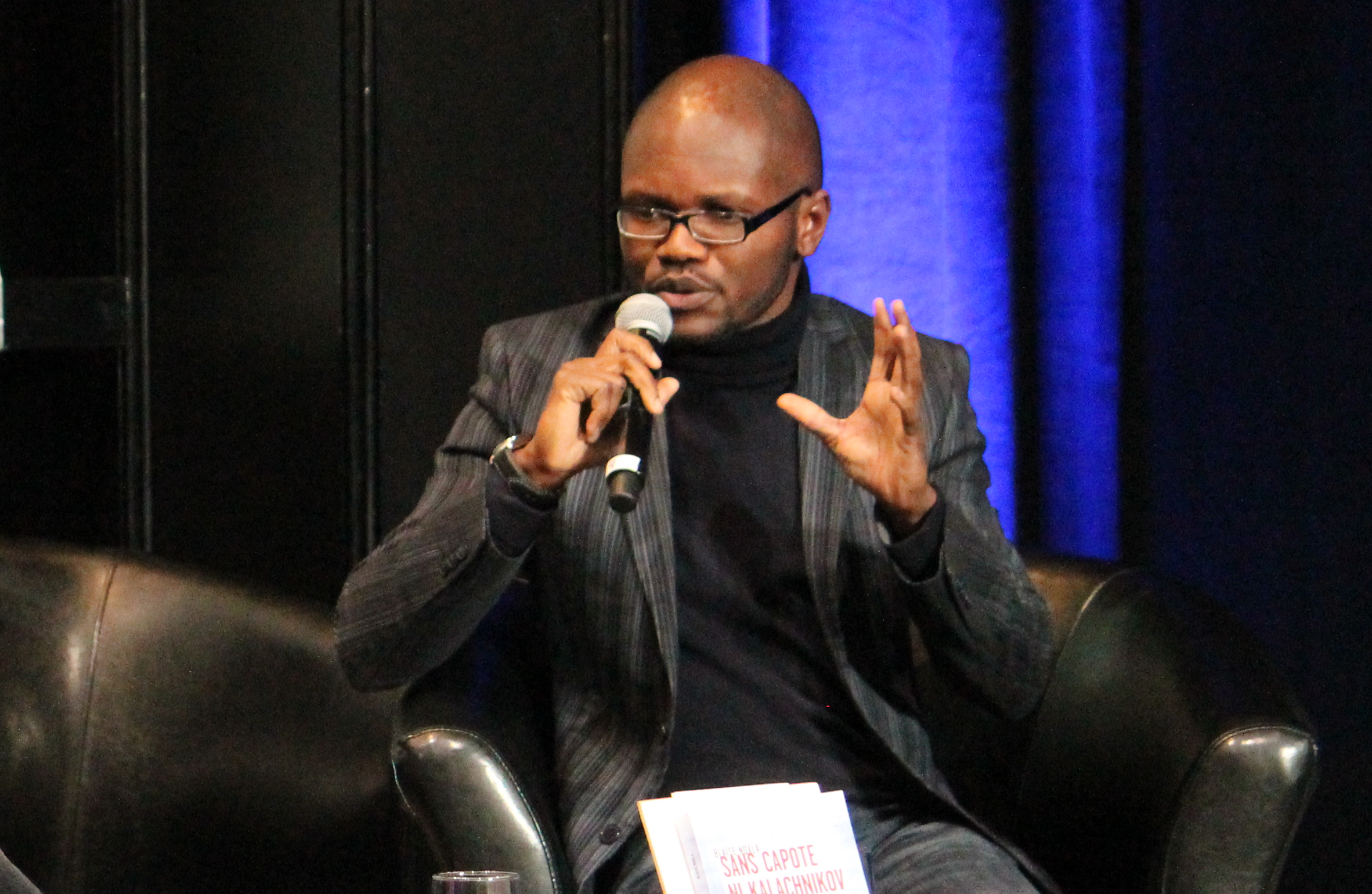
- Ndala in 2017
- Occupation: writer
- Notable work: Le Combat des livres

Blaise Ndala is a Canadian writer. He is most noted for his novel Sans capote ni kalachnikov, which won the 2019 edition of Le Combat des livres.

Originally from the Democratic Republic of the Congo, Ndala emigrated to Canada in 2007 and works as a lawyer in Ottawa. His debut novel, J'irai danser sur la tombe de Senghor, was published in 2014; it won the Ottawa Book Award for French fiction, and was a finalist for the Trillium Award. The novel was subsequently optioned for a film adaptation by director Rachid Bouchareb.

Sans capote ni kalachnikov was published in 2017, and was a finalist for the Trillium Award and the Grand prix littéraire d'Afrique noire. In Le Combat des livres, the novel was defended by journalist Marie-Maude Denis.

Dans le ventre du Congo was published in 2021, and later translated in English as In the Belly of the Congo.

He was shortlisted for the Trillium Book Award for French Prose in 2026 for L'Équation avant la nuit.
