= Soufiane Chakkouche =

Canadian writer (born 1977)

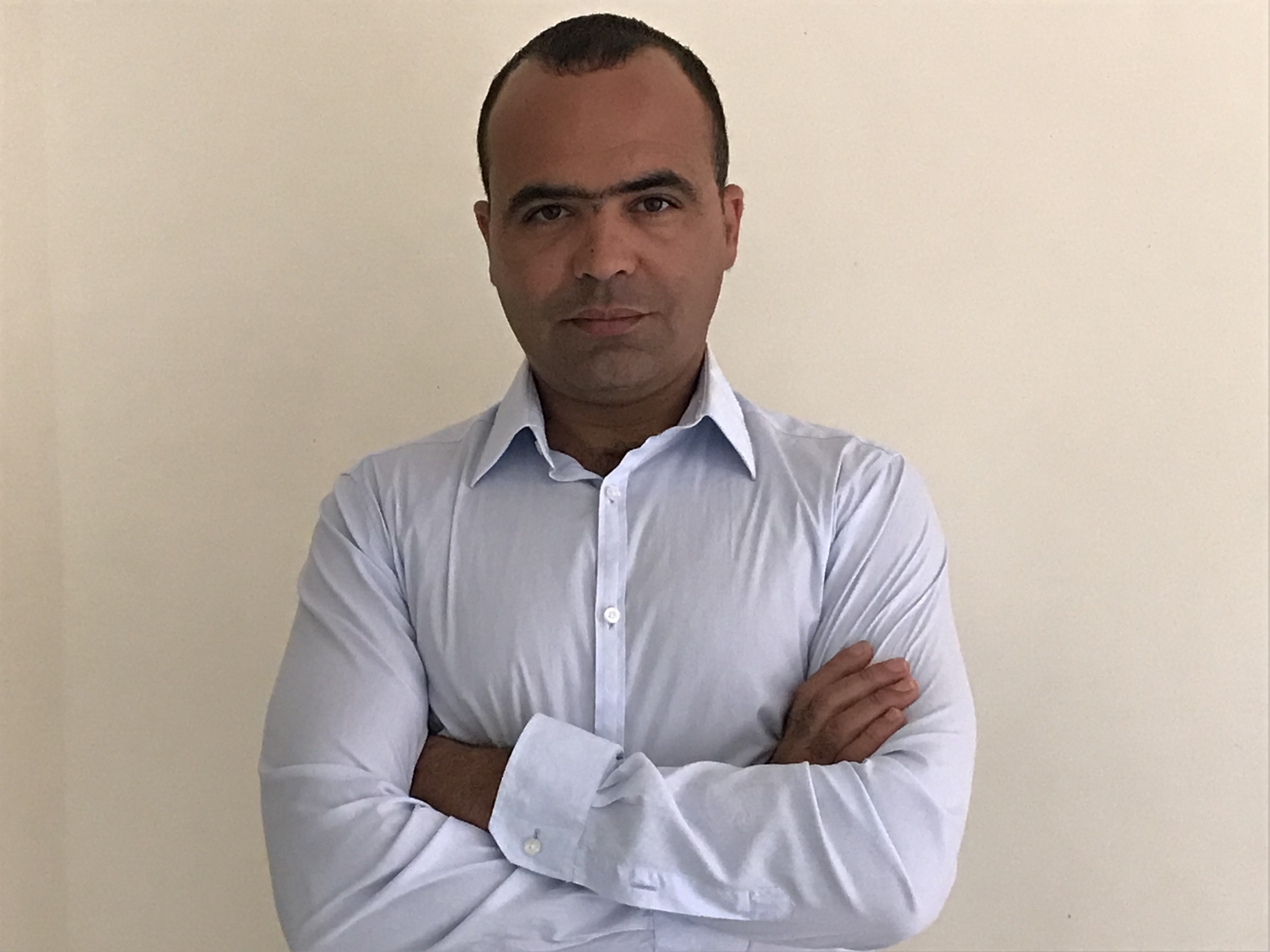
- Born: December 23, 1977 (age 48); Casablanca, Morocco
- Occupations: novelist, journalist
- Writing career
- Period: 2000s–present
- Notable work: Zahra

Soufiane Chakkouche is a Moroccan Canadian writer and journalist. He is most noted for his novel Zahra, which was shortlisted for the Trillium Book Award for French Prose and the Prix Alain-Thomas in 2022.

He previously published the novels L'inspecteur Dalil à Casablanca and L'inspecteur Dalil à Paris.

He resides in Toronto, Ontario, where he works as a Queen's Park political reporter for TFO.
