= Didier Leclair =

Canadian author (born 1967)

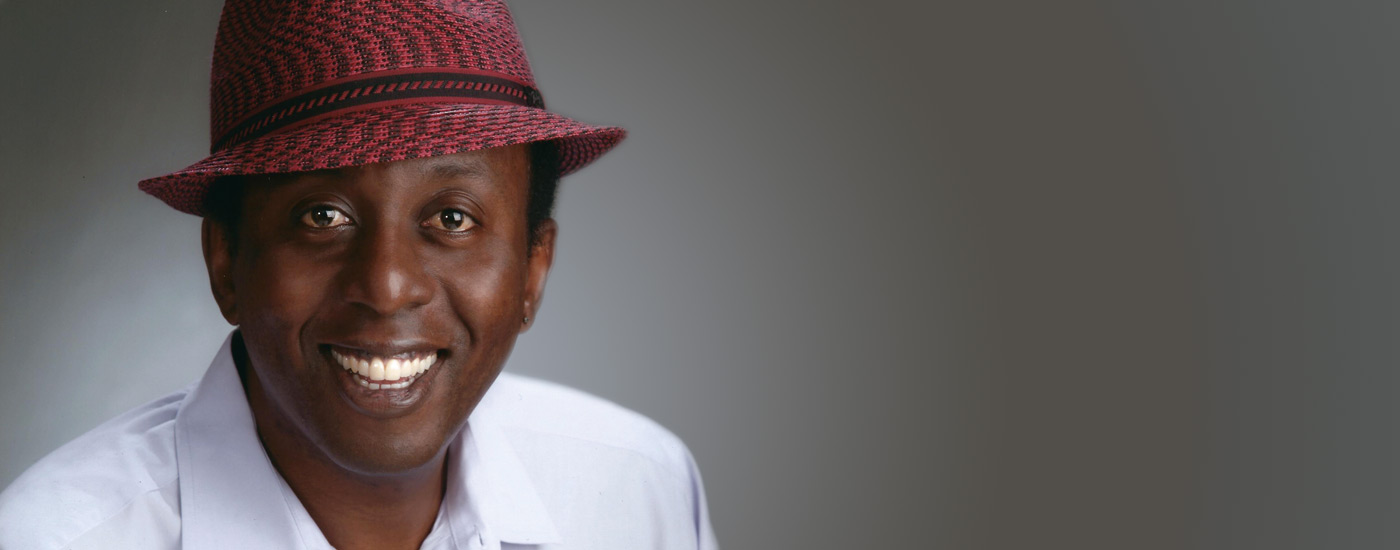
writer Didier Leclair

Didier Leclair (born Didier Kabagema, 1967 in Montreal) is a Canadian francophone fiction writer currently based in Toronto. He has lived in various countries in Africa, and has studied at Laurentian University in Sudbury and Toronto's Glendon College.

== Awards and recognition ==
- 2000: French-language winner, Trillium Book Award, Toronto, je t'aime
- 2004: French-language fiction finalist, Governor General's Awards, Ce pays qui est le mien
- 2011: French-language finalist, Trillium Book Award, Le soixantième parallèle
- 2016: French-language finalist, Trillium Book Award, Pour l'amour de Dimitri
- 2016: French-language winner, Christine Dimitriu Van Saanen Book Award, Pour l'amour de Dimitri
- 2018: French-language finalist, Trillium Book Award, Le Bonheur est un parfum sans nom
- 2019: English-language finalist, Toronto Book Award, This Country of mine (Translated work by Elaine Kennedy)
- 2025: French-language winner, Alain-Thomas Book Award, Le prince africain, le traducteur et le nazi
- 2025: French-language finalist, Trillium Book Award, Le prince africain, le traducteur et le nazi

== Bibliography ==
- 2000: Toronto, je t'aime (Vermillon) ISBN 1-895873-93-2
- 2003: Ce pays qui est le mien (Vermillon) ISBN 1-894547-74-8
- 2007: Un passage vers l'Occident (Vermillon) ISBN 978-1-897058-60-2
- 2010: Le soixantième parallèle (Vermillon) ISBN 978-1-897058-87-9
- 2012: Le complexe de Trafalgar (Vermillon) ISBN 978-1-77120-126-1
- 2014: "Un ancien d'Afrique", (Vermillon) ISBN 978-1-77120-158-2
- 2015: "Pour l'amour de Dimitri", (Les Éd. David) ISBN 978-2-89597-452-9
- 2017: "Le bonheur est un parfum sans nom", (Les Ed. David) ISBN 978-2-89597-598-4
- 2019: Translation of Ce pays qui est le mien by Elaine Kennedy: This Country of Mine, (Deux Voiliers Pub.) ISBN 978-1-92804-952-4
- 2019: "Le vieil homme sans voix", (Les Ed. David) ISBN 978-2-89597-717-9
- 2022: Translation: "Toronto, I Love You" by Elaine Kennedy, Mawenzi House publishing, (ISBN 978-1-77415-066-5)
- 2024: "Le prince africain, le traducteur et le nazi" (Les éd. David) ISBN 978-2-89597-970-8
- 2026: "Entre miel et fiel", poetry (Les éd. Terre d'Accueil) ISBN 978-2-925133-66-7
- 2026: "Faites vos jeux, rien ne va plus" (Les éd. David) ISBN 978-2-89866-103-7
- 2026: Translation: "The African Prince, the Translator and the Nazi" (Mawenzi House) ISBN 978-1-77415-222-5
