= Chloé LaDuchesse =

Canadian poet

Chloé LaDuchesse is a Canadian poet, born in Montreal, Quebec, and based in Sudbury, Ontario. Her collection Exosquelette was a shortlisted finalist for the Governor General's Award for French-language poetry at the 2021 Governor General's Awards, and the 2022 winner of the Trillium Book Award for French Poetry.

LaDuchesse published her first collection, Furies, in 2017, and was a Trillium nominee in 2018. She served as the poet laureate of the City of Greater Sudbury from 2018 to 2020, although her time in the position was marked by a minor controversy when the city rescinded its invitation for her to read the poem she had written for the inauguration ceremony for the new Greater Sudbury City Council following the 2018 Greater Sudbury municipal election.

LaDuchesse published her debut novel L'Incendiare de Sudbury in 2022. It was selected for inclusion in the 2023 edition of Le Combat des livres, where it was defended by journalist Brigitte Noël.
