= Robert Dickson (writer) =

Canadian poet, translator and academic

- Born: July 23, 1944; Erin, Ontario, Canada
- Died: March 19, 2007 (aged 62); Sudbury, Ontario, Canada
- Occupations: poet, translator, academic
- Writing career
- Period: 1970s-2000s
- Notable work: Humains paysages en temps de paix relative

Robert Dickson (July 23, 1944 – March 19, 2007) was a Canadian poet, translator and academic. Born and raised in Erin, Ontario, he spent much of his life and career living in Sudbury.

He studied French language and literature at the University of Toronto and Université Laval, receiving his doctorate in 1972, and spent his academic career as a professor for the Department of French Studies and Translation at Laurentian University in Sudbury. He won the Governor General's Award for French language poetry in 2002, for his book Humains paysages en temps de paix relative (ISBN 978-2894231449).

His first poetry collection, Une bonne trentaine (ISBN 978-0889840447) was published by The Porcupine's Quill in 1975, the only French language work ever published by that company. A poem from that collection, "Au nord de notre vie", was set to music by the folk rock group CANO, and came to be adopted as an anthem of Franco-Ontarian culture. His later poetry collections, all published by Prise de parole, included Or(é)alité (1978, ISBN 978-0920814093), Abris nocturnes (1986, ISBN 978-0920814888), Grand ciel bleu par ici (1997, ISBN 978-2894230664) and Libertés provisoires (2005, ISBN 978-2894231753).

A compilation of his poetry, translated into English by Jo-Anne Elder, was published by Guernica Editions under the title Human Presences and Possible Futures (2013, ISBN 978-1550716665).

He also translated both French and English literary works, including English translations of works by Jean-Marc Dalpé and French translations of works by Tomson Highway and Lola Lemire Tostevin.

Over the course of his career, he was also awarded the Prix du CCRCF from the University of Ottawa's Centre for Research on French Canadian Culture and the Prix Nouvel-Ontario, and was named to the Ordre de la Pléiade in 2005.

Dickson died at his home in Sudbury on March 19, 2007, from brain cancer.

== Quotation ==
"Si je peux poser quelques pierre blanches

pour baliser le sentier à inventer,
je ne serais que très content,
croyant que j'ai ainsi fait quelque chose

de valable avec ma vie." — Robert Dickson
