= Lorenzo Cadieux =

Canadian Jesuit priest, historian and academic

- Born: October 13, 1908
- Died: September 13, 1990 (aged 81)

Fr. Lorenzo Cadieux, SJ (November 10, 1903 – 1976) was a Canadian Jesuit priest, historian and academic.

Born in Granby, Quebec, he was educated in Montreal, Quebec and Edmonton, Alberta, studying literature, philosophy, theology and history, and was ordained in 1924.

In 1940, he moved to Sudbury, Ontario to teach history at Collège Sacré-Coeur, which became part of Laurentian University in 1960. Cadieux served as head of the history faculty at Laurentian until his retirement in 1972. He also founded the Société historique du Nouvel-Ontario in 1942, a historical society which pursued historical research relating to Northern Ontario. Cadieux was especially noted as one of the major early chroniclers of Franco-Ontarian history.

He also served as president of the Canadian Society of History in 1960. There is a Cadieux Lane in Sudbury named in his honour.
