= Brigitte Haentjens =

Canadian theatre director

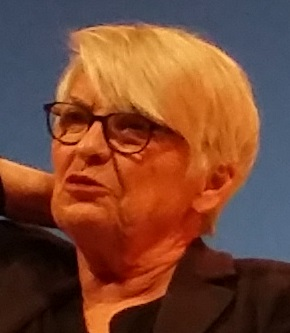
Brigitte Haentjens photographed in Montréal, Québec, Canada at the Espace Go.

Brigitte Haentjens, OC is a Canadian theatre director and president of her own company, Sybillines, which she founded in 1997. She was formerly the artistic director at Canada's National Arts Centre French Theatre in Ottawa.

== Biography ==
Born in France, she studied theatre in Paris before moving to Ontario in Canada at the age of 25.

== Career ==
From 1982 to 1990, she was artistic director of the Théâtre du Nouvel-Ontario in Sudbury, turning it into a major venue of Francophone Canadian theatre through her productions of works by playwrights such as Michel Marc Bouchard and Jean-Marc Dalpé. She also cowrote several works with Dalpé, including Nickel.

In 1990, she moved to Montreal, becoming artistic director of the Nouvelle Compagnie Théâtrale, in Montréal, from 1991 to 1994, and as co-director for the Carrefour International de Théâtre de Québec from 1996 to 2006. In addition to continuing to direct theatre for several companies in Montreal, she also directed at the National Arts Centre, in Ottawa, founded her own company, Sybillines, in 1997, and, in October 2007, received the prestigious Elinor and Louis Siminovitch Prize in Theatre for her 30-year career in Québec theatre.
