= Guy Sylvestre =

Canadian civil servant (1918–2010)

Jean-Guy Sylvestre

Director of the National Library of Canada
- In office 1968–1983

Personal details
- Born: May 17, 1918 Sorel, Quebec
- Died: September 26, 2010 (aged 92) Ottawa, Ontario

Guy Sylvestre (Jean-Guy Sylvestre), OC, FRSC (May 17, 1918 – September 26, 2010) was a Canadian literary critic, librarian and civil servant.

Born in Sorel, Quebec, he attended College Ste-Marie, Montreal, and received his B.A. in 1939 and MA in 1942 from the University of Ottawa where he began his literary career as writer and critic.

By his early twenties he had already published several articles in journals and newspapers, and was literary critic for the Ottawa newspaper Le Droit 1939–48, and founder of his own journal. Publication of Anthologie de la poésie canadienne d’expression française established him as an intellectual and a specialist in Canadian poetry. He was a founding member of the Académie canadienne-française in 1944 and President of the Royal Society of Canada 1973–74.

Sylvestre served as a translator in the Senate of Canada from 1942 to 1944 and at the World War II Wartime Information Board in 1944 and 1945. He was subsequently private secretary to Louis St. Laurent, Prime Minister of Canada, between 1945 and 1950, a position which led to important civil service jobs.

In 1956 to 1968, he was Associate Director of the Library of Parliament and then became the second National Librarian at what is now Library and Archives Canada from 1968 to 1983. The library experienced extraordinary growth under his leadership, housed in a new building on Wellington Street. The collection grew rapidly and the national bibliography Canadiana was automated.

After retirement from the civil service, he was President of the Canadian Institute for Historical Microreproductions from 1983 to 1986; Chairman, Ottawa Valley Book Festival, 1988–92; Chairman of Committee for the Governor General's Literary Awards; Past Chairman, Canadian Writers Foundation.

President, World Poetry Conference, 1967. Ordre International du bien public, 1970; Order of Merit of the Republic of Poland; IFLA Medal; Canadian Representative Intergovernmental Council for General Information Programs, Unesco 1979–83; Canadian Delegation to UNESCO, Conferences 1949, 1970, 1972, 1974; Chairman, Conference of Directors of National Libraries, 1974–77; Chairman, National Libraries Section, IFLA, 1977–81; Canadian Public Service Outstanding Public Service Award, 1983; Societa' Dante Alighieri, rome, 1971; Life member, Canadian Library Association,(CLA); Association Technologie de la documentation; Honorary Life member, Ontario Library Association(OLA); Member and First President, Canadian Association for Information Science; Recipient of Queen Elizabeth II Golden Jubilee Medal.

In 1943, he married Françoise Poitevin. They had a daughter, Marie, and three sons, Jean, Louis and Paul. They have two grandchildren, Jean Martin and Julie Michelle.

== Bibliography ==
- Louis Francoeur, journaliste, 1941
- Situation de la poésie canadienne, 1942
- Anthologie de la poésie canadienne d'expression française, 1943
- Poètes catholiques de la France contemporaine, 1944
- Jules Laforgue, 1945
- Sondages, 1945
- Impressions de théâtre, 1950
- Panorama des lettres canadiennes françaises, 1964
- Canadian writers / Écrivains canadiens, 1964
- Un siècle de littérature canadienne, 1967
- Guidelines for national libraries, 1987.
- Full publications list at WorldCat

Professional and academic associations
Preceded by John Tuzo Wilson	President of the Royal Society of Canada; 1973–1974	Succeeded by Claude Fortier
