= Aristote Kavungu =

Canadian writer

Aristote Kavungu is a Canadian writer.

== Background ==
He was born in the Democratic Republic of the Congo to parents from Angola, with his father spending time imprisoned at Stanleyville during the Simba rebellion. He later pursued university education at Sorbonne Paris North University in France before moving to Canada.

== Career ==
He published his debut novel, L'Adieu à San Salvador, in 2001. The book was shortlisted for the Prix Anne-Hébert that year. He wrote the screenplay for the 2002 short film Pour l'amour d'Aicha, directed by Izabel Barsive.

He followed up in 2003 with Un Train pour l'Est, which was the winner of the Prix Christine-Dumitriu-Van-Saanen from the Salon du livre de Toronto.

He published the novels Une petite saison au Congo in 2010 and Il ne s'est presque rien passé ce jour-là in 2015. In 2016 he published the poetry collection C'est l'histoire d'un enfant qu'on ne raconte pas aux enfants and the short story collection Dame-pipi blues.

In 2019 he published Mon père, Boudarel et moi, a semi-autobiographical novel based in part around his own real-life experiences when, while living in Paris, he found and returned the lost briefcase of accused war criminal Georges Boudarel, and was left pondering how a man who seemed so kind and ordinary to him could have been pushed to commit the crimes Boudarel had been accused of. The novel was shortlisted for the Trillium Book Award, French in 2020; writer Téa Mutonji, a former student of his, was a nominee in the English category in the same year.

In 2020 he published Quand j'étais nègre, a novella whose title deliberately played on the dual meaning of the French word "nègre" as both the racially-loaded term for negro and the occupational term for ghostwriter.

L'Accordéoniste, was published in 2021.

He won the Trillium Book Award in 2025 for Céline au Congo.

He teaches French literature at the École secondaire catholique Saint-Charles-Garnier in Whitby, Ontario, and has been a host on the Greater Toronto Area's francophone community radio station CHOQ-FM.
