= Maurice Henrie =

Canadian writer and academic (1936–2024)

- Born: December 19, 1936
- Died: October 1, 2024 (aged 87)
- Occupations: Writer, academic

Maurice Henrie (December 19, 1936 – October 1, 2024) was a Canadian writer and academic. He was most noted as the winner of the Trillium Book Award for French literature in 1996 for his novel Le Balcon dans le ciel.

== Life and career ==
Originally from Rockland, Ontario, he worked in the federal civil service before publishing his debut short story collection La Chambre à mourir in 1988. The book was shortlisted for the Trillium Book Award in 1989, and was the winner of that year's Ottawa Book Award.

In 1989, he published La Vie secrète des grands bureaucrates, a volume of humorous and satirical essays about the civil service; the book's English translation, The Mandarin Syndrome: The Secret Life of Senior Bureaucrats, was published in 1990 and was a finalist for the Stephen Leacock Memorial Medal for Humour in 1991. He followed up in 1992 with both the sequel book Le Petit monde des grands bureaucrates and the short story collection Le Pont sur le temps, with the latter again winning the Ottawa Book Award in 1993.

Le Balcon dans le ciel was published in 1995. In addition to the Trillium Book Award, the novel was also the winner of the Salon du livre de Toronto's Grand Prix for Franco-Ontarian literature in 1995.

He has also been a Trillium Book Award nominee on three other occasions, receiving nods in 2005 for Les Roses et le verglas, in 2012 for L'Enfant Cément and in 2018 for Le poids du temps, and a Salon du livre nominee in 2007 for Le chuchotement des étoiles.

Henrie died on October 1, 2024, at the age of 87.

== Works ==
=== Novels ===
- 1995 – Le Balcon dans le ciel (Prise de parole)
- 2001 – Une ville lointaine (L'instant même)
- 2007 – Le Chuchotement des étoiles (Prise de parole)
- 2011 – L'enfant Cement (Prise de parole)
- 2020 – Odette (University of Ottawa Press)

=== Short story collections ===
- 1988 – La Chambre à mourir (L'Instant même)
- 1992 – Le Pont sur le temps (Prise de parole)
- 1996 – La Savoyane (Prise de parole)
- 1998 – Fleurs d'hiver (Prise de parole)
- 2003 – Mémoire vive (L'Instant même)
- 2004 – Les Roses et le verglas (Prise de parole)
- 2008 – Esprit de sel (Prise de parole)
- 2009 – Le Jour qui tombe (L'Interligne)
- 2012 – Petites pierres blanches (Éditions David)
- 2016 – Ne pleure pas Jeannette (Chardon bleu)
- 2019 – La Maison aux lilas (University of Ottawa Press)

=== Essays ===
- 1989 – La Vie secrète des grands bureaucrates (Asticou)
- 1990 – The Mandarin Syndrome (University of Ottawa Press)
- 1992 – Le Petit monde des grands bureaucrates (Montagne)
- 2013 – Aveux et confidences (Prise de parole)
- 2017 – Le Poids du temps (University of Ottawa Press)
- 2018 – Donc je suis (University of Ottawa Press)
- 2022 – La Tête haute (University of Ottawa Press)
