= François Paré =

Canadian author and academic

François-Rosaire Paré (born 1949 in Longueuil, Quebec) is a Québécois author and academic specialising in the literature of cultural minorities, though He started his career as a professor of French Renaissance literature.

Paré lived in Montreal during his youth. After earning his Bachelor of Arts degree at the Université de Montréal, he pursued further studies in Buffalo, New York at SUNY. He would eventually settle in Ontario, first at St Catharines, then moving to the Kitchener-Waterloo region to teach at the University of Guelph. He was the Chair of the French Studies Department at the University of Waterloo from 2003 to 2010 and is now the Graduate officer for the department.

== Awards and recognition ==
- 1993: French non-fiction winner, Governor General's Awards, Les Littératures de l'exiguïté
- 2003: French winner, Trillium Book Award, La distance habitée
- 2009: Lifetime achievement award, Canadian Society for Renaissance Studies

== Bibliography ==
- 1992: Les Littératures de l'exiguïté (Le Nordir) ISBN 2-921365-08-1
- 1994: Théories de la fragilité (Le Nordir) ISBN 2-921365-34-0
- 2000: Traversées, with Francois Ouellet(Le Nordir) ISBN 2-921365-97-9
- 2003: La distance habitée (Le Nordir) ISBN 2-89531-042-4
- 2007: Le fantasme d'Escanaba (Nota Bene) ISBN 978-2-89518-230-6
- 2008: Louis Hamelin et ses doubles, with Francois Ouellet (Nota Bene) ISBN 978-2-89518-309-9

== See also ==
- List of University of Waterloo people
