= Gabriel Osson =

Haitian-Canadian writer and broadcaster

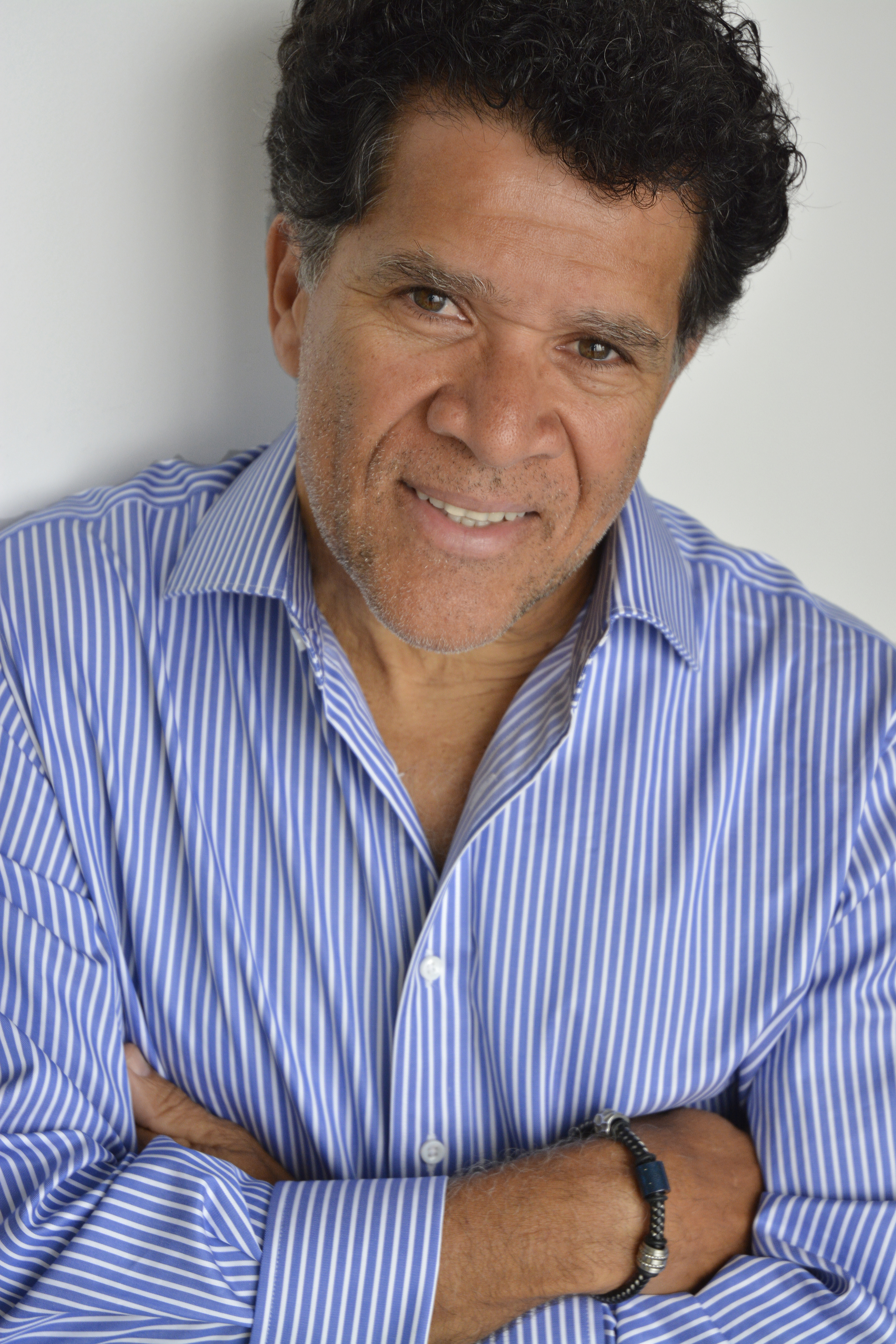
- Born: Port-au-Prince, Haiti
- Occupations: novelist, poet
- Writing career
- Period: 2000s-present
- Notable work: Le jour se lèvera

Gabriel Osson is a Haitian-Canadian writer and broadcaster, whose novel Le jour se lèvera won the Prix Alain-Thomas from the Salon du livre de Toronto in 2021.

Originally from Port-au-Prince, he is currently based in Toronto, Ontario, where he hosts the weekly world music show Franco découvertes on CHOQ-FM, and serves as president of the Association des auteurs.res de l’Ontario français and founding president of the Association Haïti Futur-Canada.

Osson has published three poetry collections, Efflorescences (2001), Envolées (2009) and D'ici et d'ailleurs (2021), and the travel memoir J’ai marché sur les étoiles: sept leçons apprises sur le chemin de Compostelle (2015). Concurrently with the release D'ici et d'ailleurs, he also released an album of spoken word recitations of the book's poems with musical accompaniment by Dieufaite Charles and Fred Osson.

His debut novel, Hubert le restavèk, was published in 2017, and was followed by Le jour se lèvera in 2020 and Les Voix du chemin in 2021.

In 2019, he was one of 37 Franco-Ontarian writers anthologized in Poèmes de la résistance, a collection of poetry about the controversial cuts to Franco-Ontarian cultural institutions by the government of Doug Ford. In the same year, he was named by Ici Radio-Canada as one of the 25 most significant Black Canadian figures in Franco-Ontarian culture.
