= Michel Dallaire =

Canadian novelist and poet

Michel Dallaire (January 7, 1957 – April 25, 2017) was a Canadian novelist and poet. He was most noted for his novel Violoncelle pour une lune d'automne, which won the Trillium Book Award for French language children's literature and the Prix Christine-Dumitriu-Van-Saanen in 2015.

Born in Hawkesbury, Ontario, Dallaire grew up in the small mining town of Manitouwadge, where he attended primary and secondary school before moving to Sudbury in 1977 where he lived for the remainder of his life and career. In addition to poetry and fiction work, he also wrote songs that were performed by musicians including Stef Paquette, Chuck Labelle and Paul Demers.

== Works ==
=== Fiction ===
- L'oeil interrompu – 1985
- Dans ma grande maison folle – 1995
- L'enfant de tout à l'heure – 2000
- Famien (sa voix dans le brouillard) – 2005
- l'anarchie des innocences – 2007
- Violoncelle pour lune d'automne – 2014

=== Poetry ===
- Regards dans l'eau – 1981
- Cinéma muet – 1990
- Ponts brûlés et Appartenances – 1998
- (le pays intime) – 1999
- À l'écart du troupeau – 2003
- l'écho des ombres – 2004
- l'éternité derrière – 2008
- pendant que l'Autre en moi t'écoute – 2010
- dégainer – 2013
- le souffle des dragons – 2016
- nomadismes – 2016
