= Estelle Beauchamp =

Canadian educator and writer

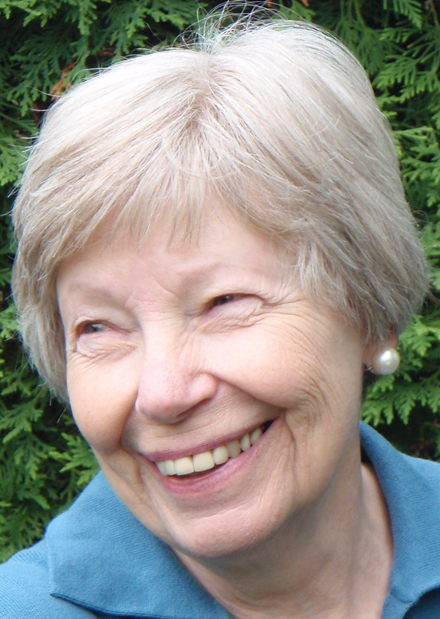
- Born: Montreal, Canada
- Occupation: educator
- Genre: novel

Estelle Beauchamp is a Canadian educator and writer.

She was born in Montreal, where she worked as a language teacher. Beauchamp moved to Ottawa in 1974. She later moved to Sudbury.

== Works ==
- Les Mémoires de Christine Marshall (Prise de parole, 1995)
- La Vie empruntée (Prise de parole, 1998)
- Les Enfants de l'été (Prise de parole, 2004) — received the Prix Émile-Olivier
- Un souffle venu de loin (Prise de parole, 2010) — received the Prix du livre d'Ottawa and the Trillium Book Award
