= Nancy Vickers (writer) =

Canadian writer (born 1946)

Nancy Vickers (born 1946) is a Canadian writer based in Ottawa, Ontario. She is most noted as winner of the 1997 Trillium Book Award, French for her novel Le Pied de Sappho.

Born and raised in Arvida, Quebec, she has lived in Ottawa since 1967. She published her first poetry collection, Au parfum du sommeil, in 1989.

She was also a Trillium nominee in 2009 for Aeterna: Le jardin des immortelles and in 2023 for Capharnaum, and has been a two-time Ottawa Book Award winner for La Petite Vieille aux poupées in 2003 and Capharnaum in 2023.

She is the mother of filmmaker Karim Hussain.

== Works ==
- Au parfum du sommeil - 1989
- La Montagne de verre - 1993
- Le Trône des maléfices - 1994
- Les sorcières de Chanterelles - 1996
- Le pied de Sappho - 1996
- Tchador - 1998
- Les nuits de la Joconde - 1999
- L'hermaphrodite endormi - 1999
- Les satins du diable - 2002
- La Petite Vieille aux poupées - 2003
- Aeterna: Le jardin des immortelles - 2009
- Capharnaum - 2022
