= Jean Mohsen Fahmy =

Jean Mohsen Fahmy (born 1942) is an Egyptian Canadian writer. He is most noted for his 2005 novel L'Agonie des dieux, which was the winner of the Trillium Book Award for French fiction in 2006, and his 2019 novel La sultane dévoilée, which was the winner of the Prix Christine-Dumitriu-Van-Saanen from the Salon du livre de Toronto in 2019.

He was a shortlisted Trillium finalist on two other occasions, for Amina et le mamelouk blanc in 1999 and for Frères ennemis in 2010.

== Works ==
=== Fiction ===
- Le Désert et le loup (1985)
- Amina et le mamelouk blanc (1998)
- Ibn Khaldoun – L’honneur et la disgrâce (2002)
- Lumières (2003)
- L’Agonie des dieux (2005)
- Alexandre et les trafiquants du désert (2007)
- Frères ennemis (2009)
- Le Berger du soleil (2009)
- Les Chemins de la liberté, tome 1 : Fabien et Marie (2013)
- Les Chemins de la liberté, tome 2 : L'Ultime Voyage (2014)
- La sultane dévoilée (2019)
- Par-delà les frontières (2023)

=== Non-fiction ===
- Voltaire et l’amitié (1972)
- Études Rousseau Trent (1980)
- Jean-Jacques Rousseau et la société du XVIII siècle (1981)
- Voltaire et Paris (1981)
- Chrétiens d'Orient, le courage et la foi (2015)
