= Christine Dumitriu Van Saanen =

Christine Dumitriu Van Saanen (1932 – April 2008) was a Romanian-born Canadian writer, educator, engineer and geologist.

== Biography ==
The daughter of a Dutch diplomat in Romania, she was born in Bucharest and was educated there and at the Oil & Gas Institute. She came to Canada in 1977. She taught at the École Polytechnique de Montréal and then the Université du Québec à Montréal. From 1982 to 1987, she taught at the University of Calgary. In 1982, she founded the Société littéraire francophone de l'Alberta and served as its president until 1987. She then moved to Ottawa, where she was head of a company specializing in artificial intelligence. She moved to Toronto in 1990, where she taught French to members of the public service. In 1992, she founded the Salon du livre de Toronto and served as its director general until 2006. The annual prize awarded by the Salon du livre was named the Prix Christine-Dumitriu-van-Saanen in 1999. Van Saanen also taught at Glendon College at York University.

She published both scientific articles and poetry. Poetry collections included L'Univers est, donc je suis (1998), Mémoires de la Terre (1999), Les Heures sable (2001), La Saga cosmique (2003) and Hommage aux origines de la vie (2006).

Van Saanen died in Toronto at the age of 76 from complications related to cancer.
