= Hélène Koscielniak =

Canadian novelist

Hélène Koscielniak is a Franco-Ontarian educator and writer.

Born in Fauquier, she received a degree in Organizational Studies (Faculty of Education) from the University of Ottawa. She worked in the field of education. Now retired, she lives in Kapuskasing.

She served on the board of governors for Science North and on the Comité consultatif de langue française for TFO.

== Selected works ==
- Marraine (2007), received the Prix Littérature éclairée du Nord in 2009, finalist for the Prix des lecteurs de Radio-Canada in 2008, finalist for the Prix Christine-Dumitriu-van-Saanen in 2007
- Carnet de bord (2009), received the Prix Littérature éclairée du Nord in 2010
- Contrepoids (2011), received the Prix littérature éclairée du Nord in 2012
- Filleul (2012), received the Prix littérature éclairée du Nord in 2013, finalist for the Prix des lecteurs de Radio-Canada in 2013
