= Melchior Mbonimpa =

Burundian-Canadian writer (born 1955)

Melchior Mbonimpa (born 1955) is a Burundian-Canadian writer. He is most noted for his novel Les morts ne sont pas morts, which won the Prix Christine-Dumitriu-Van-Saanen from the Salon du livre de Toronto in 2006. He was previously a finalist for the same award in 2002 for Le totem des Baranda, and in 2004 for Le dernier roi faiseur de pluie.

A professor of philosophy in the department of religious studies at Laurentian University in Sudbury, Ontario, he has written both novels and non-fiction work on African politics. In 2019, he was named one of the 25 most important Black Canadian personalities in Franco-Ontarian culture by Ici Radio-Canada.

Le totem des Baranda was selected for the 2021 edition of Le Combat des livres, where it was defended by filmmaker Tanya Lapointe.

== Works ==
=== Fiction ===
- Le totem des Baranda (2001, Prise de parole)
- Le dernier roi faiseur de pluie (2003, Prise de parole)
- Les morts ne sont pas morts (2006, Prise de parole)
- La terre sans mal (2008, Prise de parole)
- La tribu de Sangwa (2012, Prise de parole)
- Diangombé l'Immortel (2015)
- Au sommet du Nanzerwé il s'est assis et il a pleuré (2020)

=== Non-fiction ===
- Idéologies de l’indépendance africaine (1989)
- Hutu, Tutsi, Twa (1993)
- Ethnicité et démocratie en Afrique (1994)
- Défis actuels de l’identité chrétienne (1996)
- La Pax Americana en Afrique des Grands Lacs (2000)
