= Michèle Laframboise =

Canadian writer and comics artist

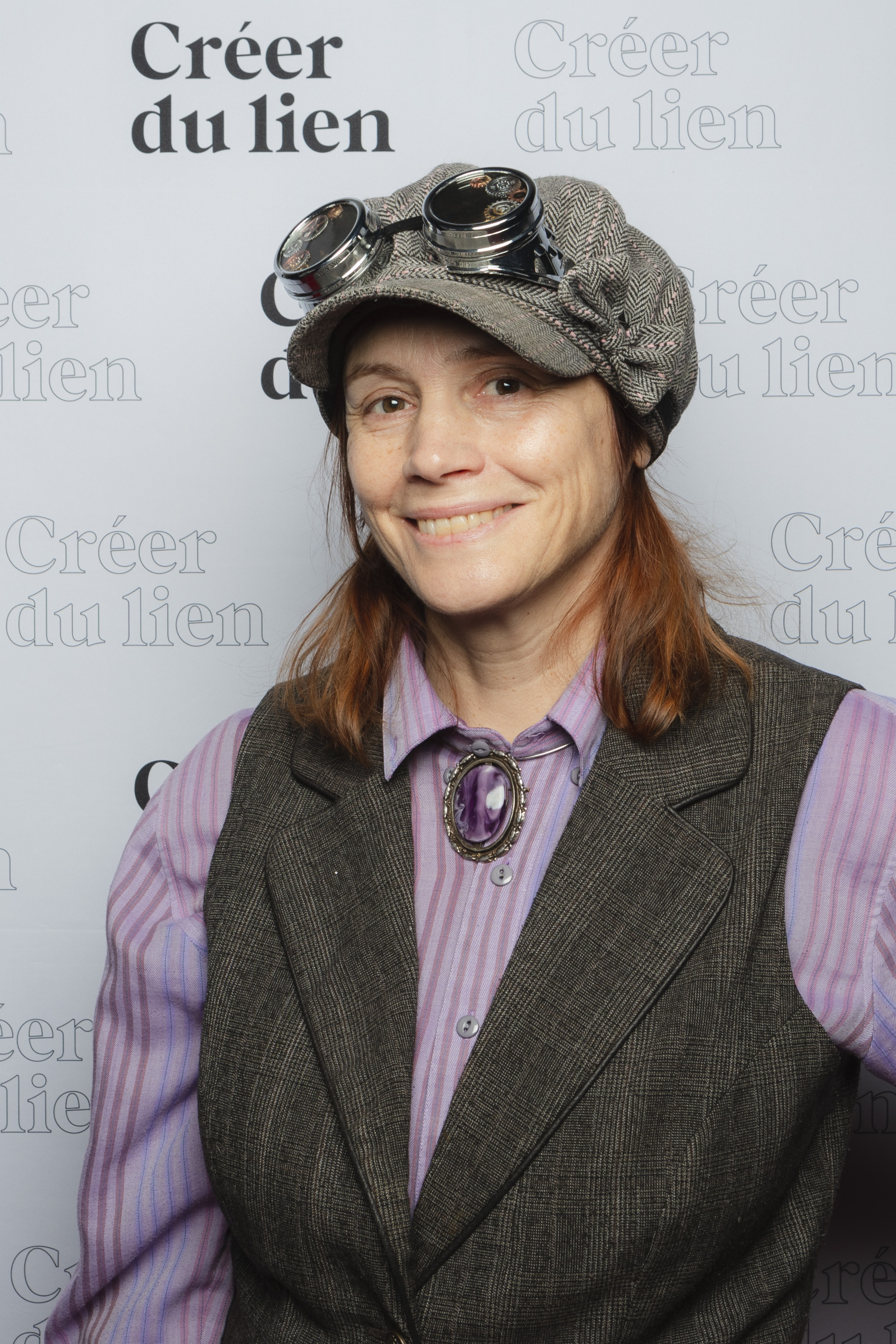
Salon du livre de Montréal, novembre 2022.

Michèle Laframboise (born July 14, 1960) is a Canadian science fiction writer and comics artist.

== Early life and education ==
The daughter of Québécois parents, she was born in London. Laframboise studied geography at the Université de Montréal and civil engineering at the École Polytechnique de Montréal. She is also a self-taught illustrator.

== Writing career ==
Her first novel, Les nuages de Phoenix, was awarded the Prix Cécile-Gagnon. She received Prix Aurora Awards in 2005 for Best novel in French ( Les Mémoires de l'Arc) and Best story in French ("Ceux qui ne comptent pas").

She received another Aurora award in 2009 (La Quête de Chaaas); she was a finalist for another Aurora award in 2010. She received the Prix Solaris in 2010 and was a finalist for a Governor General's Literary Award in 2009.

Laframboise's novelette "In the Gardener’s Service" was a finalist for the 2026 Aurora Award.

== Personal life ==
She currently lives near Toronto.

== Published works ==
=== Novels ===
- Les voyages du Jules-Verne series: Piège pour le Jules-Verne (2002) Le stratège de Léda (2003) Les mémoires de l'Arc (2004) Le Dragon de l'Alliance (2005) Montréal, Mediaspaul
- La quête de Chaaas series: La quête de Chaaas (2007), Les vents de Tammerlan (2008), L'axe de Koudriss (2010), La spirale de Lar Jubal, (2011), Le labyrinthe de Luurdu (2012) Montréal, Mediaspaul
- Mica, fille de Transyl, Gatineau, Vents d'Ouest (2012)
- Le projet Ithuriel, Ottawa, David, 2012
- La reine Margot, Gatineau, Vents d'Ouest, 2014
- L'écologie d'Odi, Montréal, Porte-Bonheur, Collection Clowns vengeurs, 2015
- Le Gant, Gatineau, Vents d'Ouest, 2016
- La ruche, Sherbrooke, Les Six Brumes, 2017
- Le secret de Paloma (2021), David, Ottawa, 330 p.
- Rose du désert (2023) David, Ottawa, 352 p.

=== Graphic Novels ===
Sources:

- La plume japonaise, Vermillon, Ottawa, 2010, 56 p.

=== Selected short-stories ===
- "In the Gardner's Service" (2025) Asimov's, July–August
- "Kuiper Pancake" (2023) Analog, May–June issue
- "Tears Down the Wall" (2023) Asimov’s, Vol. 47, Sept.-Oct. issue
- "Living on the Trap" (2023) Analog, Nov-Dec. 2023
- "I’ll Be Moon for Christmas", Asimov’s Vol. 46, #11-12
- "Screaming Fire" (2022) in Asimov’s Vol. 46, 7-8
- "Rare Earths Pineapple" (2022) in Analog July–August
- "October's Feast" (2022) in Asimov’s Vol. 46, 1-2
- "Shooting at Warner’s Bay" (2021) Asimov’s Vol. 45, 9-10
- "Cousin Entropy" (2020) in Future SF Digest 7
- "Ganymede's Lamps" (2020) in Luna Station Quarterly 42
- "Ice Monarch" (2018) in Abyss&Apex no67
- "Domus Justice" (2018) in Fiction River no27
- "Thinking Inside the Box" (2017) in Compelling Science Fiction no7
- "Slime and Crime" (2017) in Fiction River no22
- "Closing the Big Bang" (2017) in Fiction River no21
- "La cousine Entropie" (2016) in Galaxies 40
- "Sous réserve" (2016) dans Brins d'éternité 43
- "Penser à l'intérieur de la boîte" (2015) dans Géante Rouge 23
- "Monarque des glaces" (2010) Solaris 175 - Solaris Prize Winner 2010 (reprinted in 2012 in Galaxies 18)
- "Le Vol de l'abeille" (2006), Solaris 159 – Solaris Prize Winner 2006
- "Women are from Mars, Men are from Venus" (2006), Tesseract 10, Edge publ.
