= Daniel Marchildon =

Daniel Marchildon is a Franco-Ontarian novelist, short story writer, children's author, journalist and screenwriter born in Penetanguishene, Ontario. He won the 2011 French-language Trillium Book Award for children's literature for his novel La première guerre de Toronto.
