= Françoise Lepage =

French writer

- Born: December 29, 1945; Saint-Amand-Montrond, France
- Died: January 23, 2010 (aged 64); Ottawa, Canada
- Spouse: Yvan Lepage

Françoise Lepage (December 29, 1945 – January 23, 2010) was a Franco-Ontarian educator and writer.

She was born in Saint-Amand-Montrond, France, came to Canada in 1969 and settled in Ottawa in 1976. She taught children's literature at the University of Ottawa. Lepage had also worked as a librarian and as a translator.

She published Histoire de la littérature pour la jeunesse in 2000, which won the Prix Gabrielle Roy, the Prix Champlain and the Prix du livre de la Ville d'Ottawa, and then Dictionnaire des auteurs et des illustrateurs. She also published Paule Daveluy ou la passion des mots.

Lepage wrote a number of children's books and had also begun to write some adult fiction.

Her husband Yvan Lepage died in 2008. She died in Ottawa at the age of 64 from cancer.

== Selected works ==
- Poupeska (2006), received the Trillium Book Award and was nominated for a Governor General's Award
- Soudain l'étrangeté (2010)
- La fileuse de pailles et autres contes, adapted from stories by Germain Lemieux (2011)
