= Hédi Bouraoui =

Tunisian-Canadian writer

Hédi André Bouraoui CM (born July 16, 1932, in Sfax, Tunisia) is a Tunisian/Canadian poet, novelist and academic, who regularly deals with themes involving the transcendence of cultural boundaries.

Bouraoui was educated in France and in the United States, in French, English and American literature. In 1966, he joined the faculty at York University in Toronto, Ontario, where he teaches both French and English literature, specializing in African, Caribbean and franco-ontarian literatures. He also launched the Canada-Mediterranean Centre (CMC) at the university.

In May 2003, he was granted an honorary doctorate from Laurentian University in Sudbury, Ontario, in recognition of his contributions to Canadian and world literature. He has also received a number of literary awards in Canada, France, and Tunisia.

In 2018, he was named a member of the Order of Canada.

== Published works ==
=== Novels ===
- L'Icônaison, 1985 ISBN 2-89040-352-1
- Bangkok Blues, 1994 ISBN 1-895873-08-8
- Retour à Thyna, 1996 ISBN 9973-757-26-2
- La Pharaone, 1998 ISBN 9973-757-04-1
- Ainsi parle la Tour CN, 1999 ISBN 2-921463-23-7
- La Composée, 2001 ISBN 2-921463-28-8
- La Femme d'entre les lignes, 2002 ISBN 0-921916-70-1
- Sept Portes pour une Brûlance, 2005 ISBN 978-1-897058-10-7
- Puglia à bras ouverts, 2007 ISBN 978-2-9809692-4-9
- Cap Nord, 2008 ISBN 978-1-897058-73-2
- Les aléas d'une odyssée, 2009 ISBN 978-1-897058-88-6
- Méditerranée à voile toute, 2010
- Le Conteur, 2012
- La Plantée, 2017

=== Poetry ===
- Musocktail, 1966
- Tremblé, 1969
- Eclate-Module, 1972
- Vésuviade, 1976 ISBN 2-243-00261-2
- Haïtuvois, suivi de Antillades, 1980 ISBN 2-89017-011-X
- Tales of Heritage I, 1981 OCLC 8605360
- Vers et l'Envers, 1982 ISBN 0-920802-44-3
- Ignescent, 1982 ISBN 2-903871-05-1
- Tales of Heritage II, 1986 OCLC 16049685
- Echosmos, 1986 ISBN 0-9691270-2-2 or ISBN 0-9691270-3-0
- Reflet Pluriel, 1986
- Emergent les Branches, 1986
- Arc-en-Terre, 1991 ISBN 1-895667-00-3
- Poésies, 1991
- Emigressence, 1992 ISBN 0-919925-83-9
- Nomadaime, 1995 ISBN 0-921916-52-3
- Transvivance, 1996
- L'Ange perVers, 1998
- Illuminations Autistes, 2003 ISBN 9973-51-018-6
- Struga, suivi de Margelle d'un festival, 2004 ISBN 2-923153-09-X
- Sfaxitude, 2005
- Livr'Errance, 2005
- In-side Faces/ Visages du Dedans, 2008 ISBN 978-2-9809692-6-3
- Adamesques, 2009 ISBN 978-2-915235-59-3

=== Essays ===
- Créaculture I, 1971
- Créaculture II, 1971
- The Canadian Alternative, 1980 ISBN 0-920802-16-8
- Critical Strategy, 1983 ISBN 0-920802-60-5
- La Francophonie à l'Estomac, 1995 ISBN 2-87931-047-4
- La Littérature franco-ontarienne. Etat des lieux, 2000 ISSN 1198-8282
- Pierre Léon: Poète de l'Humour, 2003 ISBN 1-894547-77-2
- Transpoétique: Éloge du Nomadisme, 2005 ISBN 2-923153-39-1
- Perspectives sur la littérature franco-ontarienne, 2007
- Vingt-quatre heures en tesselles mosaïcales, 2018

== Honours and awards ==
=== Honours ===
- 2019 : Member of the Order of Canada
- 2010 : Honorary citizenship of Acquaviva delle Fonti
- 2004 : Officier of the Ordre des Palmes Académiques (France)
- 1993 : Medal of the Regional Council of Guadeloupe

=== Awards ===
- 2005 : Prize for the best scholarly book, awarded by the Association of French Professors of Canadian Universities and Colleges
- 2000 : Africa Mediterranean / Maghreb Award
- 2000 : Christine Dumitriu Van Saanen Award
- 1999 : Comar d'or
- 1999 : Ontario Award
- 1999 : Jean-Dalba Award
- 1998 : Grand prize of Salon du livre de Toronto
- 1996 : Comar Jury Special Prize
- 1995 : Grand Prix of the city of Sfax
- 1994 : France-Canada Award

=== Honorary degrees ===
- 2003 : Laurentian University
- 1993 : Chulalongkorn University
- 1988 : American Academy of Arts and Sciences
