= Andrée Christensen =

Canadian writer and visual artist

Andrée Christensen (born April 16, 1952) is a Franco-Ontarian writer and visual artist.

She was born in Ottawa and studied at Carleton University and Dalhousie University. She taught French as a second language for the Canadian Public Service from 1975 to 1979. After 1979, she worked as an editor for the Canadian national museums.

Christensen published a collection of poetry Le Châtiment d'Orphée in 1990. She published La Femme sauvage in 1996 and Le Livre des ombres in 1998. In 1999, in collaboration with poet Jacques Flamand, she published Lithochronos ou le premier vol de la pierre in 1999, which was awarded the Trillium Book Award. Also with Jacques Flamand, she published translations in French of poetry by Christopher Levenson, Joe Rosenblatt, Virgil Burnett and Nadine McInnis.

Her novel Depuis toujours, j'entendais la mer, published in 2007, was awarded the Prix Émile-Ollivier. the Prix de la ville d'Ottawa, the Prix littéraire Le Droit and the Prix Christine-Dumitriu-Van-Saanen.
