= Gabrielle Poulin =

Canadian writer

- Born: June 21, 1929
- Died: January 31, 2015 (aged 85)

Gabrielle Poulin (June 21, 1929 - January 31, 2015) was a Canadian writer. One of the most prominent writers in Franco-Ontarian literature, she was most noted for her 1994 novel Le Livre de déraison, which won the Grand Prix du Salon du livre de Toronto in 1994.

Born and raised in Saint-Prosper, Quebec, she spent her adult life in Ottawa, Ontario with her husband, historian and academic René Dionne. She published 13 books throughout her career, including novels, short stories, poetry and non-fiction writing. In a 2000 review of a reissue of her early novel Un cri trop grand, Stefan Psenak praised her writing about women characters who were able to be both sensible and passionate.

She was a three-time Trillium Book Award nominee, receiving nods for La Couronne d'oubli in 1991, for Le Livre de déraison in 1995. and for Ombres et lueurs in 2004.

René Dionne et Gabrielle Poulin : œuvres et vies croisées, an anthology of critical essays about both Dionne's and Poulin's work, was published in December 2014 just a few weeks before Poulin's death.

== Works ==
=== Fiction ===
- Cogne la caboche (1979)

English translation All the Way Home by Jane Pentland, 1984

- Un cri trop grand (1980)
- Les Mensonges d'Isabelle (1983)
- La Couronne d'oubli (1990)
- Le Livre de déraison (1994)
- Qu'est-ce qui passe ici si tard? (1997)

=== Poetry ===
- Petites fugues pour une saison sèche (1991)
- Nocturnes de l'oeil (1993)
- Mon père aussi était horloger (1996)
- Ombres et lueurs (2003)

=== Non-fiction ===
- Les miroirs d'un poète (1969)
- Romans du pays, 1968-1979 (1980)
- La Vie, l'Écriture (2000)
