= Jean-Marc Dalpé =

Canadian playwright and poet

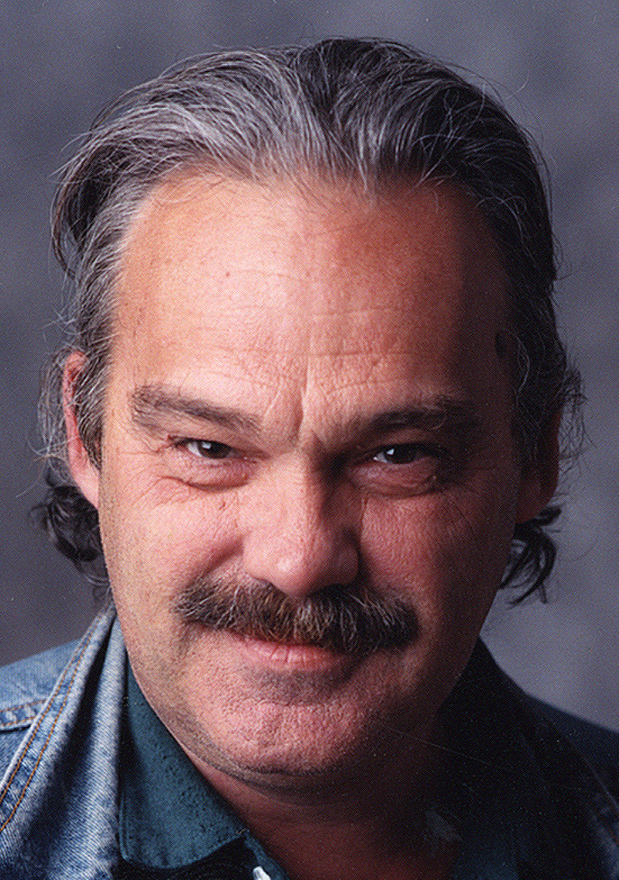
- Born: February 21, 1957 (age 69); Ottawa, Ontario, Canada
- Occupations: poet, playwright, novelist
- Writing career
- Period: 1980s–present
- Notable works: Le Chien, Un Vent se lève qui éparpille

Jean-Marc Dalpé CM (born February 21, 1957) is a Canadian playwright and poet. He is one of the most important figures in Franco-Ontarian literature.

Dalpé studied theatre at the University of Ottawa, graduating in 1973. In 1979, he obtained graduate diploma from the Conservatoire d'art dramatique de Québec. He subsequently worked with several Franco-Ontarian theatre companies, including as a co-founder of Ottawa's Théâtre de la Vieille 17 in 1979. He was also associated with the Théâtre du Nouvel-Ontario in Sudbury for several years, writing many of his early works there and publishing them with that city's Prise de parole publishing house. He returned to the University of Ottawa in 1987 as writer in residence, and was a grant adjudicator for the Canada Council the following year.

In 1990, he was writer in residence at the Festival des Francophonies in Limoges, France, and in 1993 at Montreal's Nouvelle Compagnie Théâtrale.

He won the Governor General's Award on three occasions.

On April 5, 2021, Dalpé renounced the honorary doctorate he had been given at Laurentian University to protest against severe cuts the university had made to its programs, including the French-language theatre BA.

His daughter, Marielle Dalpé, is an animator most noted for her 2023 short film Aphasia (Aphasie).

== Works ==
- Hawkesbury blues, 1982
- Nickel, 1983–1984 (co-written with Brigitte Haentjens)
- Les Rogers, 1985
- Le Chien ("The Dog"), 1988 - winner of the 1988 Governor General's Award for French Drama
- Les Murs de nos villages ("The Walls of Our Villages"), 1993
- Eddy, 1994 - winner of the Prix du Nouvel-Ontario and the Prix Le Droit
- Lucky Lady, 1995
- Il n'y a que l'amour ("There is Nothing But Love"), 1999
- Contes urbains d'Ottawa ("Urban Stories of Ottawa"), 1999
- Piégés ("Trapped"), 2000
- Un Vent se lève qui éparpille ("Scattered in a Rising Wind"), 2000 - winner of the 2000 Governor General's Award for French Fiction
- Contes sudburois ("Stories of Sudbury"), 2001
- Août: un repas à la campagne, 2006
