= Daniel Poliquin =

Canadian novelist and translator (born 1953)

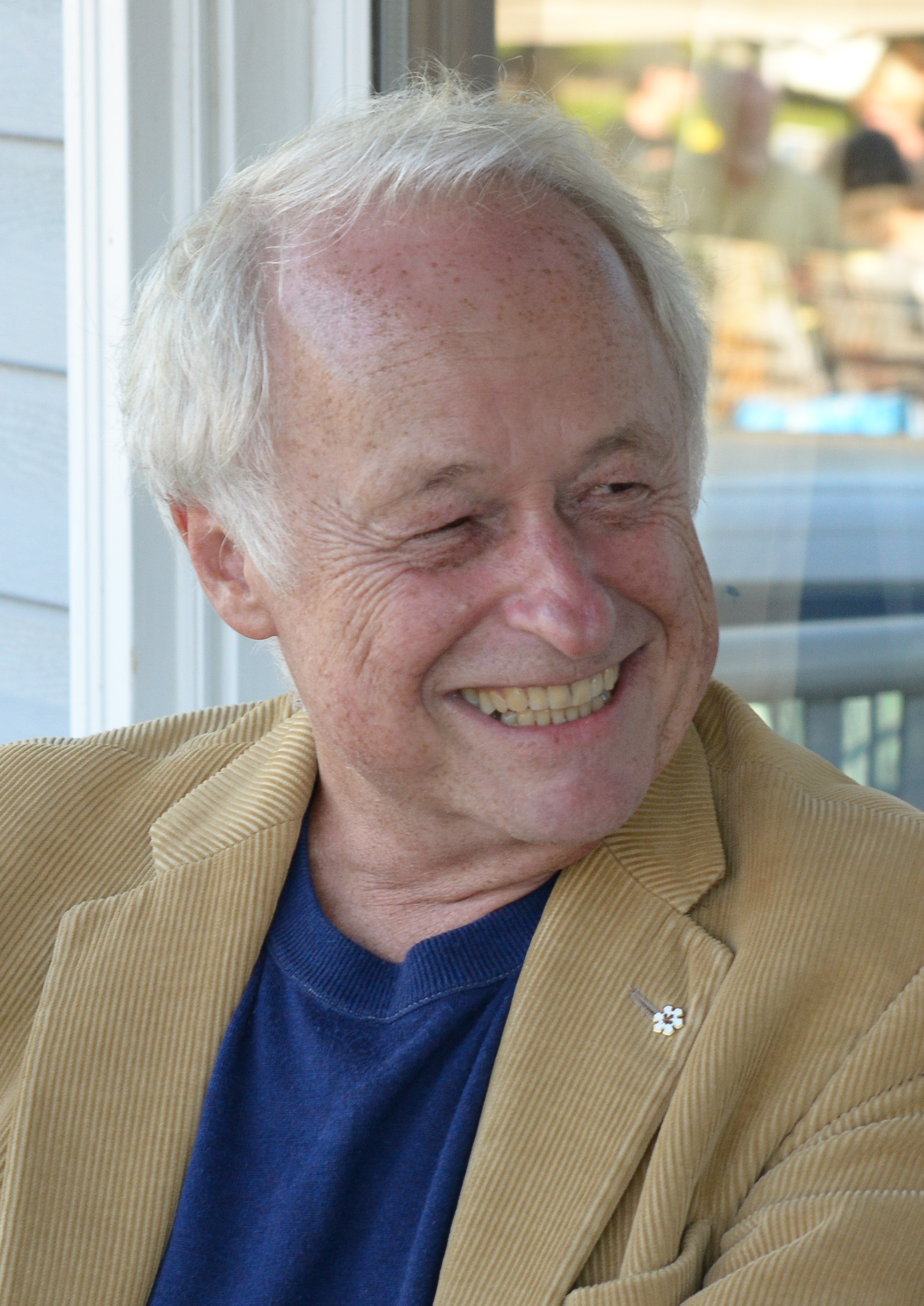
- Poliquin at the Eden Mills Writers' Festival in 2016

Daniel Poliquin OC (born December 18, 1953) is a Canadian novelist and translator. He has translated works of various Canadian writers into French, including David Homel, Douglas Glover, and Mordecai Richler. Poliquin and his hometown of Ottawa are the subjects of 1999 documentary film L'écureuil noir (English: The Black Squirrel), directed by Fadel Saleh for the National Film Board of Canada.

He was awarded the Order of Canada with the grade of member and was recently promoted to the grade of officer in 2015. Poloquin is also a Chevalier in the Ordre de la Pleiade and a recipient of the Queen’s Jubilee Medal. He won the Governor General's Award for English to French translation in 2014 for his translation of Thomas King's The Inconvenient Indian: A Curious Account of Native People in North America, and in 2017 for his translation of Alexandre Trudeau's Barbarian Lost: Travels in the New China. In 2017, he was awarded an honorary Doctor of Literature from Carleton University.

== Personal life ==
He lives in Ottawa. He is the brother of the late Charles Poliquin and son of the late Jean-Marc Poliquin.

== See also ==
- Franco-Ontarian
- List of French Canadian writers from outside Quebec

== Bibliography ==
- Temps Pascal (1982), ISBN 2-89051-084-0
- Nouvelles de la capitale (1987), ISBN 2-89037-346-0
- Visions de Jude (1990), ISBN 2-89037-409-2 (republished in 2000 as La Côte de Sable, translated into English as Visions of Jude)
- L'écureuil noir (1994), ISBN 2-89052-602-X (nominated for a Governor General's Award, translated into English as Black Squirrel)
- Le Canon de Gobelins (1995), ISBN 2-921365-44-8
- Samuel Hearne: Le marcheur de l'Arctique (1995), ISBN 2-89261-128-8
- L'homme de paille (1998), ISBN 2-89052-891-X (winner of the 1998 Trillium Book Award, translated into English as The Straw Man)
- L'Obomsawin (1999, [1987]), ISBN 2-89406-155-2 (translated into English as Obomsawin of Sioux Junction)
- Le roman colonial (2000), ISBN 2-7646-0081-X
- In the Name of the Father (2001), (winner of the Shaughnessy Cohen Prize for Political Writing)
- La kermesse (2006), ISBN 2-7646-0438-6
- A Secret Between Us (2007), (Donald Winkler, trans.), Douglas & McIntyre (finalist for the Scotiabank Giller Prize)
- René Lévesque (2009), ISBN 978-0-670-06919-4 (nominated for the Charles Taylor Prize and the Shaughnessy Cohen Award)
- The Angel's Jig (2016), Goose Lane Editions
- Cherche rouquine, coupe garçonne (2017), BOREAL
