= Trillium Book Award =

Annual Canadian literary award

- Awarded for: Outstanding work of literature in Ontario
- Sponsored by: Government of Ontario
- Country: Canada
- Presented by: Ontario Creates
- Reward: Books: CA$20,000 for author; CA$2,500 for publisher Other categories: CA$10,000 for author; CA$2,000 for publisher
- First award: 1987
- Website: www.ontariocreates.ca/our-sectors/book/trillium-book-award

The Trillium Book Award (French: Prix littéraire Trillium or Prix Trillium) is an annual literary award presented to writers in Ontario, Canada. It is administered by Ontario Creates, a Crown agency of the Government of Ontario, which is overseen by the Ministry of Heritage, Sport, Tourism and Culture Industries. The monetary component for the award includes amounts paid to the author of the book and to the publisher of the book. The award has been expanded several times since its establishment in 1987: a separate award for French-language literature was added in 1994, an award for poetry in each language was added in 2003, and an award for French-language children's literature was added in 2006.

== History ==
The Trillium Book Award was created for three reasons:

- to recognize a book of literary excellence which furthers the understanding of Ontarians and Ontario society;
- to assist Ontario’s publishing industry; and,
- to bring Ontario’s public library and writing communities closer together.

The Trillium Award was one of several creative initiatives undertaken by the Libraries and Community Information Branch while under the direction of Wilfried (Wil) Vanderelst during the 1980s, that encouraged the development of Ontario writers and the distribution of their works. When created in 1987 the Trillium Book Award/Prix Trillium was the richest book award in Canada with a cash prize of $10,000 to the winner. It was also unique in that a separate $2000 would go to the publisher of the winning book to assist in its marketing and promotion. Under the auspices of the Libraries Branch, both the shortlisted books and the finalist were marketed through a unique logo for the prize, posters, bookmarks as well as an aggressive six-week media campaign targeting both bookstores as well as public libraries. (The prize today is $20,000 for the writer with $2,500 for the publisher, and $10,000/$2000 for the poetry prize.)

The first jury was bilingual and selected seven nominees for the book award. Books in both languages were considered, as were poetry, fiction, and non-fiction books. The members of the first jury were Joyce Marshall, novelist and translator; Pierre Levesque, an Ottawa bookseller and specialist in French Canadian books; Grace Buller, retired librarian and former editor of Ontario Library Review (of Books); William Eccles, historian and Professor Emeritus; and Wayne Grady, anthologist, critic, translator, and former editor of Harrowsmith.

The Trillium Book Award met with considerable approval from newspaper book editors at the time of the first award in 1988. While some critics did not like a judged competition involving personal taste in reading the material, the benefits of the award in assisting the marketing of Canadian books was thought more important. The Writers’ Union led at that time by the writer Matt Cohen met with Wil Vanderelst and strongly supported both programs given cutbacks in support for arts organizations at the federal level. Through reprioritizing, the public libraries budget these programs continued – although the writers in libraries program was eventually eliminated as part of the province’s budgetary restrictions. The Trillium Book Award managed to avoid the budgetary ax only through the personal support of the then Premier, Bob Rae. He is the only Premier of Ontario who has attended the presentation program of the award.

== Awards and eligibility ==
The Trillium Award is open to books in any genre: fiction, non-fiction, drama, children's books, and poetry. Anthologies, new editions, re-issues and translations are not eligible. Electronic and self-published books are also ineligible. Three jury members per language judge the submissions, select the shortlist and the winning title. The jury is composed of writers and other members of the literary community.

Canadian citizens and landed immigrants who have lived in Ontario for at least three out of the past five years and who have been published anywhere in the world are eligible. Their publishers are invited to submit titles to the Ministry of Culture for consideration. In 1993 the award was expanded by Premier Bob Rae's government to also include a French-language category; it was first awarded in 1994.

In 2003, new English and French poetry categories were added to the awards. The following year, however, due to the smaller number of French-language titles published in Ontario there were not enough French poetry submissions to present an award; accordingly, the French section is now divided into poetry and children's literature awards presented in alternating years, with each award having an eligibility period of two years rather than one. The English poetry award continues to be presented yearly, and an English children's literature award is not presented; however, English children's books are eligible to be nominated for the English fiction award.

== Winners and nominees ==
From 1987 to 1993, when only a single award was presented irrespective of language or literary genre, winners and nominees are directly listed below. From 1994 on, please see Trillium Book Award, English and Trillium Book Award, French.

Year	Author	Title	Result	Ref
1987	Michael Ondaatje	In the Skin of a Lion	Winner	
1987	Chad Gaffield	Language, Schooling and Cultural Conflicts	Nominee	
1987	Welwyn Wilton Katz	False Face	Nominee	
1987	Linda McQuaig	Behind Closed Doors	Nominee	
1987	Tom Patterson and Allan Gould	First Stage: The Making of the Stratford Festival	Nominee	
1987	Daniel Poliquin	L'Obomsawin	Nominee	
1987	Paul Quarrington	King Leary	Nominee	
1988	Timothy Findley	Stones	Winner	
1988	Margaret Atwood	Cat's Eye	Nominee	
1988	Neil Bissoondath	A Casual Brutality	Nominee	
1988	Matt Cohen	Living on Water	Nominee	
1988	Anne Collins	In the Sleep Room	Nominee	
1988	Robertson Davies	The Lyre of Orpheus	Nominee	
1988	Mark Frutkin	Atmospheres Apollinaire	Nominee	
1988	Maurice Henrie	La Chambre à mourir	Nominee	
1988	Peter F. Neary	Newfoundland in the North Atlantic World, 1929-1949	Nominee	
1988	Jeffrey Simpson	Spoils of Power: The Politics of Patronage	Nominee	
1989	Modris Eksteins	Rites of Spring	Winner	
1989	John Ayre	Northrop Frye	Nominee	
1989	Patrick Brode	The Odyssey of John Anderson	Nominee	
1989	Barbara Carey	The Year in Pictures	Nominee	
1989	Ken Dryden and Roy MacGregor	Home Game: Hockey and Life in Canada	Nominee	
1989	John English	The Life of Lester B. Pearson, Volume I: Shadow of Heaven, 1897–1948	Nominee	
1989	Brian Loring Villa	Unauthorized Action	Nominee	
1989	Alan Walker	Franz Liszt, Volume 2: The Weimar Years, 1848-1861	Nominee	
1989	William Westfall	Two Worlds	Nominee	
1989	Ronald Wright	Time Among the Maya	Nominee	
1990	Alice Munro	Friend of My Youth	Winner	
1990	Donald Akenson	At Face Value: The Life and Times of Eliza McCormack/John White	Nominee	
1990	Pierre Berton	The Great Depression 1929-1939	Nominee	
1990	Dionne Brand	No Language Is Neutral	Nominee	
1990	Mary di Michele	Luminous Emergencies	Nominee	
1990	Northrop Frye	Words with Power: Being a Second Study of the Bible and Literature	Nominee	
1990	Jack Granatstein and Robert Bothwell	Pirouette: Pierre Trudeau and Canadian Foreign Policy	Nominee	
1990	Ann-Marie MacDonald	Goodnight Desdemona (Good Morning Juliet)	Nominee	
1990	Gabrielle Poulin	La Couronne d'oubli	Nominee	
1990	Diane Schoemperlen	The Man of My Dreams	Nominee	
1991	Margaret Atwood	Wilderness Tips	Winner	
1991	Constance Beresford-Howe	A Serious Widow	Nominee	
1991	Eliza Clark	Miss You Like Crazy	Nominee	
1991	Robertson Davies	Murther and Walking Spirits	Nominee	
1991	Janette Turner Hospital	Isobars	Nominee	
1991	Norman Levine	Something Happened Here	Nominee	
1991	David Macfarlane	The Danger Tree	Nominee	
1991	Alberto Manguel	News from a Foreign Country Came	Nominee	
1991	Anne Michaels	Miner's Pond	Nominee	
1991	Rohinton Mistry	Such a Long Journey	Nominee	
1991	John Sawatsky	Mulroney: The Politics of Ambition	Nominee	
1992	Michael Ondaatje	The English Patient	Winner	
1992	Carole Corbeil	Voice-Over	Nominee	
1992	John English	The Worldly Years: The Life of Lester Pearson 1949-1972	Nominee	
1992	Joan Finnigan	Wintering Over	Nominee	
1992	Barbara Gowdy	We So Seldom Look on Love	Nominee	
1992	Sandra Gwyn	Tapestry of War: A Private View of Canadians in the Great War	Nominee	
1992	Steven Heighton	Flight Paths of the Emperor	Nominee	
1992	Janette Turner Hospital	The Last Magician	Nominee	
1992	Ronald Wright	Stolen Continents	Nominee	
1993	Margaret Atwood	The Robber Bride	Winner	
1993	Jane Urquhart	Away	Winner	
1993	Andrée Christensen	Pavane pour la naissance d'une infante defunte	Nominee	
1993	Leslie Smith Dow	Adele Hugo: La Miserable	Nominee	
1993	Ernest Hillen	The Way of a Boy: A Memoir of Java	Nominee	
1993	John Ibbitson	The Night Hazel Came to Town	Nominee	
1993	Ivan Kalmar	The Trotskys, Freuds and Woody Allens: Portraits of a Culture	Nominee	
1993	Pierre Léon	Sur le piste des Jolicoeur	Nominee	
1993	Leon Surette	The Birth of Modernism: Ezra Pound, T. S. Eliot, W. B. Yeats and the Occult	Nominee	
1993	Susan Swan	The Wives of Bath	Nominee	
