= List of people from Greater Sudbury =

This is a list of people from the city of Greater Sudbury, Ontario, Canada. It includes people from all communities and nations within the current city boundaries.

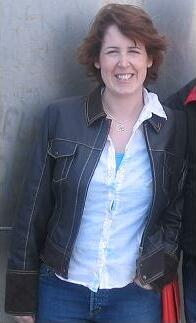
Kelley Armstrong

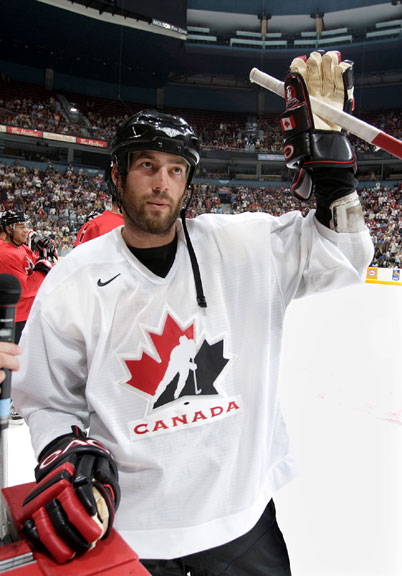
Todd Bertuzzi

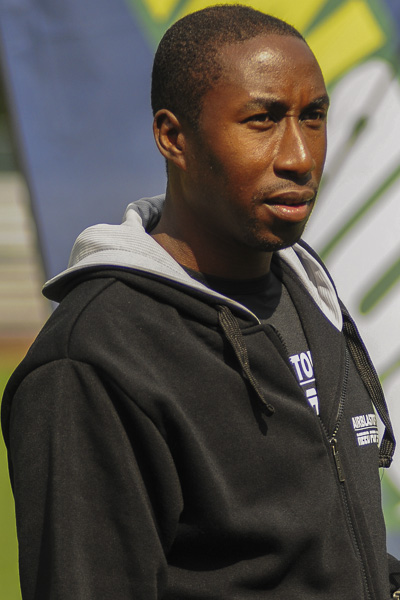
Robert Esmie

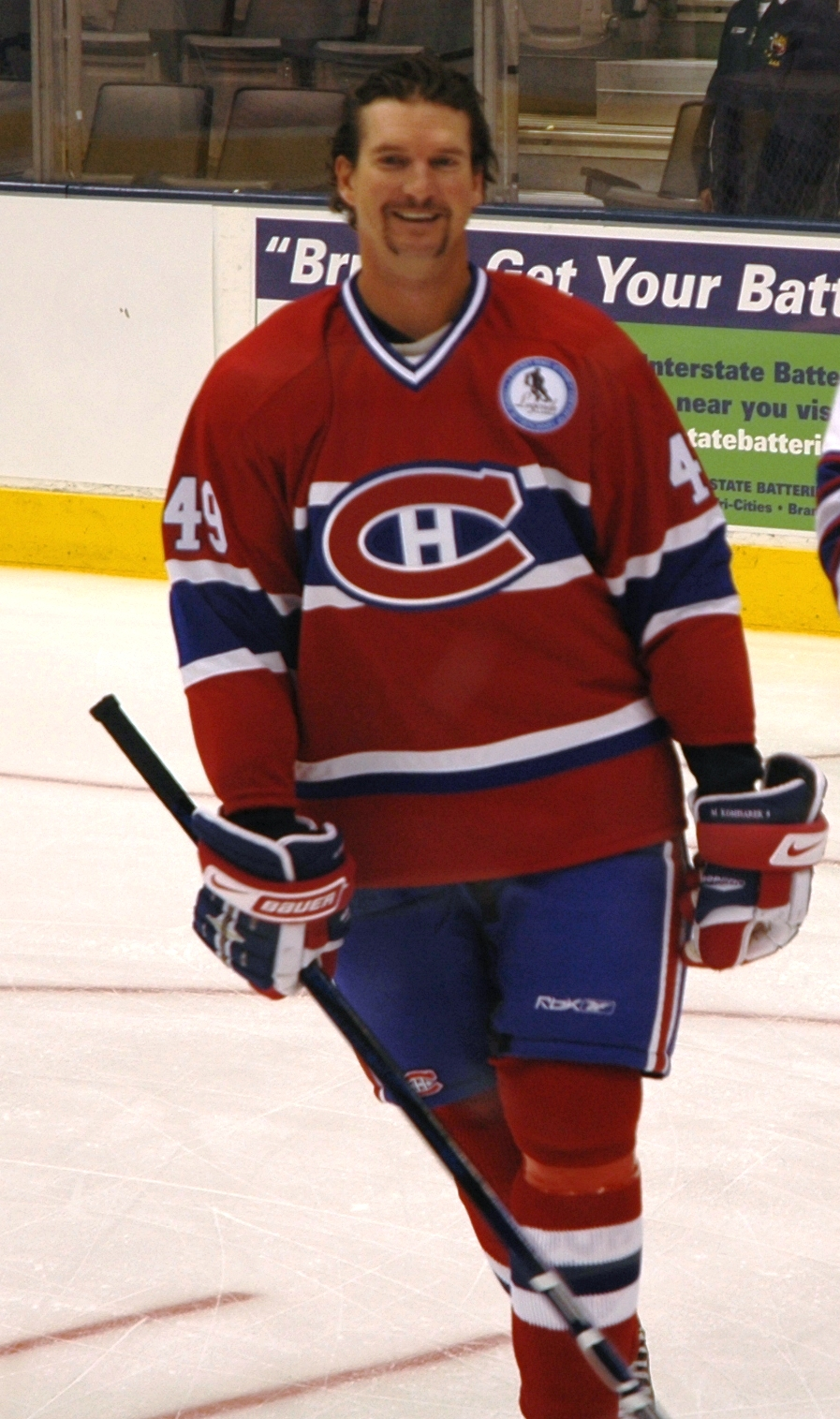
Brian Savage

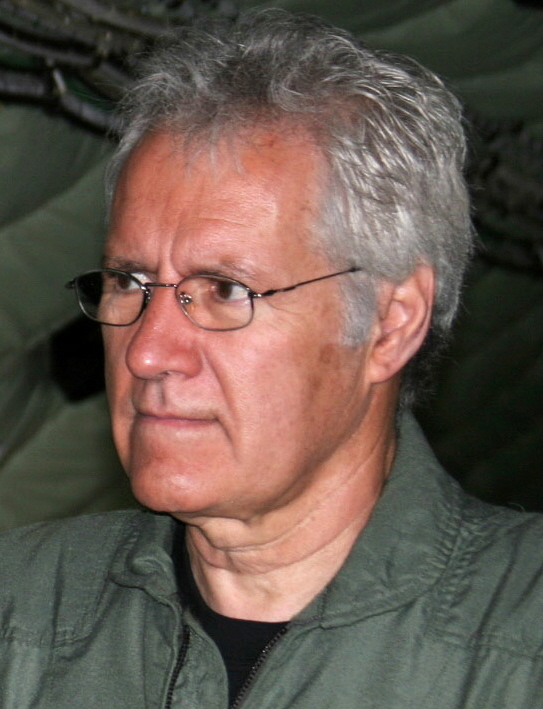
Alex Trebek

== A ==
- Eve Adams, politician
- Chuck Adamson, goaltender
- Alfons Adetuyi, film director (High Chicago, Love Jacked)
- Robert Adetuyi, screenwriter (Stomp the Yard)
- Al Arbour, NHL coach
- George Armstrong, NHL Hall of Famer
- Kelley Armstrong, author, creator of the Women of the Otherworld book series
- Brian Ashton, soccer player
- Larry Aurie, former captain of the Detroit Red Wings
- Marcel Aymar, musician

== B ==
- John Baby, hockey player
- Robert Bain, politician
- Drew Bannister, hockey player
- Andy Barbe, hockey player
- Rick Bartolucci, politician
- Alex Baumann, Olympic gold medalist (1984)
- William S. Beaton, politician
- Jean Robert Beaulé, politician
- Rhéal Bélisle, politician
- Robert Charles Bell, author
- Richard E. Bennett, Mormon historian and author
- Christian Bernier, volleyball player
- Todd Bertuzzi, NHL hockey player
- Tyler Bertuzzi, NHL hockey player
- Larry Berrio, country musician
- Tyler Beskorowany, hockey player
- Silvio Bettio, hockey player
- Murray Biggar, politician
- Brian Bigger, politician
- Ryan Bishops, musician
- Hector "Toe" Blake, NHL player, coached eight Stanley Cup teams
- Al Blanchard, hockey player
- Sean Blanchard, hockey player
- Harry Bloy, politician
- Frank Blum, hockey player
- Michel Bock, historian and winner of the 2005 Governor General's Award for French language non-fiction
- Fred Boimistruck, hockey player
- Kerry Bond, hockey player
- Tessa Bonhomme, member of Team Canada women's hockey
- Raymond Bonin, politician
- Phillip Boudreault, boxer and biker
- Joe Bowen, Canadian sportscaster (Molson Leafs Hockey)
- Randy Boyd, hockey player
- Brian Bradley, hockey player
- Jim Bradley, politician
- Lysette Brochu, writer
- Mark Browning, musician
- Andrew Brunette, NHL player
- Cummy Burton, former NHL player with Detroit Red Wings; OHL alumni with Sudbury Wolves
- Jeffrey Buttle, figure skater

== C ==
- Lorenzo Cadieux, historian
- Bryan Campbell, NHL and WHA hockey player
- Sterling Campbell, politician
- Lucien Campeau, cardiologist
- Robert Campeau, financier
- Patricia Cano, singer and actress
- Wayne Carleton, NHL and WHA hockey player
- Robert Carlin, politician
- Randy Carlyle, NHL player, NHL coach
- Judy Feld Carr, humanitarian who rescued over 3,000 Jewish people from war-torn Syria in the 1970s and 1980s
- Susan Carscallen, figure skater
- Rita Celli, journalist
- Gene Ceppetelli, football player
- Marie Charette-Poulin, politician
- Diane Chase
- Ray Chénier, politician
- Margaret Christakos, poet
- Joe Cimino, politician
- Kevin Closs, singer-songwriter
- Francis Cochrane, politician
- Bob Cook
- Cindy Cook, children's entertainer and former host of Polka Dot Door
- James Cooper, politician
- Pedro Costa
- Sean Costello, author
- D'Arcy Coulson
- David Courtemanche, politician
- Gary Croteau
- Troy Crowder, hockey player
- Bud Cullen, politician

== D ==
- Michel Dallaire, writer
- Jean-Marc Dalpé, dramatist and two-time winner of the Governor General's Award
- Gaston Demers
- Andrew Desjardins, NHL player with the Chicago Blackhawks
- Jacqueline Desmarais, billionaire
- Jean Noël Desmarais
- Louis Desmarais
- Paul Desmarais, businessman
- Paul Desmarais, Jr.
- Nancy Diamond, politician
- Robert Dickson, poet and winner of the 2002 Governor General's Award for French poetry
- Anne Ditchburn, ballet dancer, choreographer, and Golden Globe-nominated film actress
- Ron Duguay, NHL player
- Rand Dyck, academic

== E ==
- Judy Erola, former federal cabinet minister and Member of Parliament
- Robert Esmie, Olympic gold medalist (1996)
- Jack Egers, NHL (Washington and New York Rangers)

== F ==
- Joe Fabbro, politician
- Ronald Peter Fabbro, Roman Catholic Bishop
- Norman Fawcett, politician
- Peter Fenton, politician
- Bob Fitchner, WHA and NHL hockey player
- John Flesch, NHL hockey player
- Gerry Foley, NHL hockey player
- Marcus Foligno, OHL player; silver medalist at the 2011 World Junior Ice Hockey Championships
- Mike Foligno, NHL player, OHL coach
- Nick Foligno, NHL player
- Dave Fortier, NHL and OHL player
- Marion Foster, mystery writer
- Stephen Fournier, politician
- Jim Fox, NHL hockey player
- Jason Frederick, composer and musician
- Pete Friesen, guitarist and songwriter with Alice Cooper and The Almighty
- Doug Frith, politician

== G ==
- Aaron Gavey, hockey player
- France Gélinas, MPP Nickel Belt politician
- Welland Gemmell, former MPP
- Leo Gerard, trade unionist
- Gaétan Gervais, professor, co-designer of the Franco-Ontarian flag
- Eddie Giacomin, hockey player
- Frank Giustra, business executive, particularly successful in the mining and filmmaking industries, philanthropist
- Colton Gobbo, actor
- Gerald S. Graham, imperial and naval historian; University of London professor
- Gil Grand, country musician
- Claude Gravelle, MP, Nickel Belt politician

== H ==
- Matthew Heiti, writer
- Keith Hennessy, San Francisco-based dancer, choreographer, and performance artist, regarded as a pioneer of queer and AIDS-themed expressionist dance
- Tracy Horgan, professional curler on the World Curling Tour, three time provincial junior champion
- Andrew Hyatt, country singer

== I ==
- Joe Ironstone (1898–1972), professional ice hockey player

== J ==
- James Jerome, former federal Member of Parliament and Speaker of the House of Commons
- David Johnston, former Governor General of Canada
- Rebecca Johnston, Olympic gold medalist for Canada's women's hockey team

== K ==
- Devon Kershaw, competitive cross-country skier
- Jordan Kilganon, basketball slam dunker
- Gary Kinsman, sociologist and professor at Laurentian University
- Bryden Gwiss Kiwenzie, musician

== L ==
- Cloé Lacasse, soccer player for Canada
- Chloé LaDuchesse, writer
- Marc Laforge, NHL player
- Yvon Lambert, NHL player
- François Lamoureux, musician
- Pierre Lamoureux, musician
- Viviane Lapointe, politician
- Floyd Laughren, former Member of Provincial Parliament and Ontario Minister of Finance
- Paul Lefebvre, politician
- Mark Leslie, writer, author of Spooky Sudbury
- David Lickley, filmmaker and musician
- Dave Lowry, NHL player

== M ==
- Derek MacKenzie, NHL player
- Kate Maki, singer-songwriter
- Troy Mallette, player
- Robert Marinier, playwright and television writer
- Diane Marleau, Liberal politician
- Elie Martel, NDP politician
- Shelley Martel, NDP politician
- Jake Mathews, country musician
- Bruce Mau, designer
- Marc Mayer, art curator and director of the National Gallery of Canada
- Melchior Mbonimpa, writer
- Mirl "Red" McCarthy, sportsman and coach
- Dale McCourt, NHL player
- Peter McGillivray, opera singer
- Ken McGowan, politician
- Ross McLaren, filmmaker and artist
- Pierre R. Morisset, 32nd Canadian Surgeon General
- Sharon Murdock, former MPP

== N ==
- Angela Narth, children's author
- Roger Nash, poet

== O ==
- Terry O'Reilly, CBC Radio host, author

== P ==
- B. P. Paquette, film director, screenwriter, producer, and academic
- Robert Paquette, singer-songwriter
- Stéphane Paquette, francophone singer-songwriter and actor (Météo+)
- Eli Pasquale, member of Canada's national basketball team at the 1988 Summer Olympics
- Michael Persinger, cognitive neuroscience researcher and professor at Laurentian University
- Herb Petras, Major-General (Ret.), Canadian Forces
- Michele Pollesel, Anglican bishop of Uruguay
- Reg Plummer, Olympic field hockey player
- Marie-Paule Poulin, Senator and president of the Liberal Party of Canada
- Joel Prpic NHL player

== R ==
- Alma Ricard, businesswoman and philanthropist, Officer of the Order of Canada
- F. Baxter Ricard, media proprietor
- Alex J. Robinson, country musician
- Jeff Rock, pastor of the Metropolitan Community Church of Toronto
- John Rodriguez, politician, former MP for Nickel Belt and former mayor of the city
- Kimberly Rogers, woman whose death in 2001, while under house arrest for a disputed welfare fraud conviction, became a major political issue in Ontario
- Richard Rose, theatre director
- Art Ross, NHL player
- Sam Rothschild (1899–1987), NHL player; first Sudburian to play on a Stanley Cup winning team; first Jewish hockey player in the NHL; nominated to the Canadian Curling Hall of Fame
- Jeffrey Round, writer

== S ==
- Denis St-Jules, writer and radio broadcaster
- Frank St. Marseille, hockey player and coach
- Brian Savage, NHL player
- Sarah Selecky, writer
- Dan Seguin, NHL player
- Eddie Shack, NHL player
- Marc Serré, politician
- Sandra Shamas, comedian
- Linda Sorgini, actress
- Irv Spencer, NHL player with the New York Rangers, Boston Bruins, and the Detroit Red Wings
- Frederick Squire, musician
- Karl Subban, educator, writer and "hockey dad"
- Syla Swords, basketball player

== T ==
- Dave Taylor, NHL player
- Lydia Taylor, rock singer
- Alex Tétreault, poet and playwright
- Glenn Thibeault, politician
- Floyd Thomson, hockey player
- Jan Thornhill, children's writer and artist
- Alex Trebek, television host of Jeopardy!
- Jerry Toppazzini, hockey player
- Zellio Toppazzini, hockey player

== W ==
- Thelma Walmsley, baseball player for the Racine Belles of the All-American Girls Professional Baseball League
- Kay Whitmore, NHL goalie
