= Norman Fawcett =

Canadian politician (1910–1997)

- Official 1966 portrait

MP for Nickel Belt
- In office 1965–1968
- Preceded by: Osias Godin
- Succeeded by: Gaetan Serré

Personal details
- Born: Norman Edward Fawcett; July 29, 1910 Adanac, Saskatchewan, Canada
- Died: January 26, 1997 (aged 86) Capreol, Ontario, Canada
- Party: New Democratic Party

Norman Edward Fawcett (July 29, 1910 – January 26, 1997) was a Canadian politician, who represented the riding of Nickel Belt in the House of Commons of Canada from 1965 to 1968. He was a member of the New Democratic Party.

He was born in Adanac, Saskatchewan. He later settled in Capreol, Ontario, where he worked as a railway conductor and a union activist before entering municipal politics, serving as a municipal councillor and deputy mayor beginning in 1962.

Fawcett won the 1965 Canadian federal election in Nickel Belt following the resignation of Liberal Member of Parliament Osias Godin. He represented Nickel Belt for two and a half years in the 27th Canadian Parliament, and lost his seat to Liberal challenger Gaetan Serré in the 1968 election. Following his defeat, he was re-elected to Capreol's town council as mayor in 1969, serving four years. After two years out of office, he was re-elected to town council in 1975, serving as councillor and deputy mayor until his retirement from politics in 1991.

Following his death in 1997, Raymond Bonin, John Williams, Elsie Wayne, Bill Blaikie and René Laurin delivered statements of tribute to Norman Fawcett in the House of Commons of Canada.

Fawcett's daughter Gaye was married to Elie Martel, who was the Member of Provincial Parliament for Sudbury East from 1967 to 1987. Shelley Martel, Elie Martel's daughter and Fawcett's granddaughter, won election to the Legislative Assembly of Ontario upon Elie Martel's retirement, and continued to represent the riding of Nickel Belt until her own retirement from politics in 2007. She was married to former Ontario New Democratic Party leader Howard Hampton.
