= Edelgard =

Edelgard, also Adalgard, Edelgart, or Ethelgard, is a female given name of Germanic origin, now rare. In Old High German, it combines the words for "noble" (adal, modern German edel) and "enclosure" or "house" (gard).

It may refer to:

== People ==
- Edelgard Bulmahn (born 1951), German politician
- Edelgard Huber von Gersdorff (1905–2018), German supercentenarian
- Edelgard Gräfer, a member of the German Red Army Faction terrorist group
- Edelgard Mahant, Canadian academic

== Fictional characters ==
- Edelgard von Hresvelg, from the video games Fire Emblem: Three Houses and Fire Emblem Warriors: Three Hopes
- Edelgard, from the light novel series How Not to Summon a Demon Lord
