= R.M. Bélanger Ltd. =

Canadian construction company

R.M. Bélanger Limited
- Industry: Construction
- Founder: 1961
- Headquarters: Chelmsford, Ontario
- Website: belangerconstruction.ca

R.M. Bélanger Limited, sometimes known as Bélanger Construction, is a Canadian construction company based in Chelmsford, Ontario.

The company has completed major infrastructure projects in Ontario since it was founded in 1961.

In 2021, it was twice fined for fatal accidents at work sites that the company managed.

== Organization ==
R.M. Bélanger Ltd is a construction company with headquarters on Radisson Avenue, Chelmsford, Ontario. It operates under the brand Bélanger Construction and is owned by Mr. Bélanger. It was founded in 1961 and specialises in the construction of commercial, industrial and institutional infrastructure. In 2008, the company employed 591 staff, and in 2009 it employed 515.

== History ==
In 2005, the company was selected to build a student residence for Laurentian University.

In 2014, the company was fined $200,000 for federal and provincial tax evasion. The company under reported workers wages by $1.242 million in the tax years of 2008 and 2009.

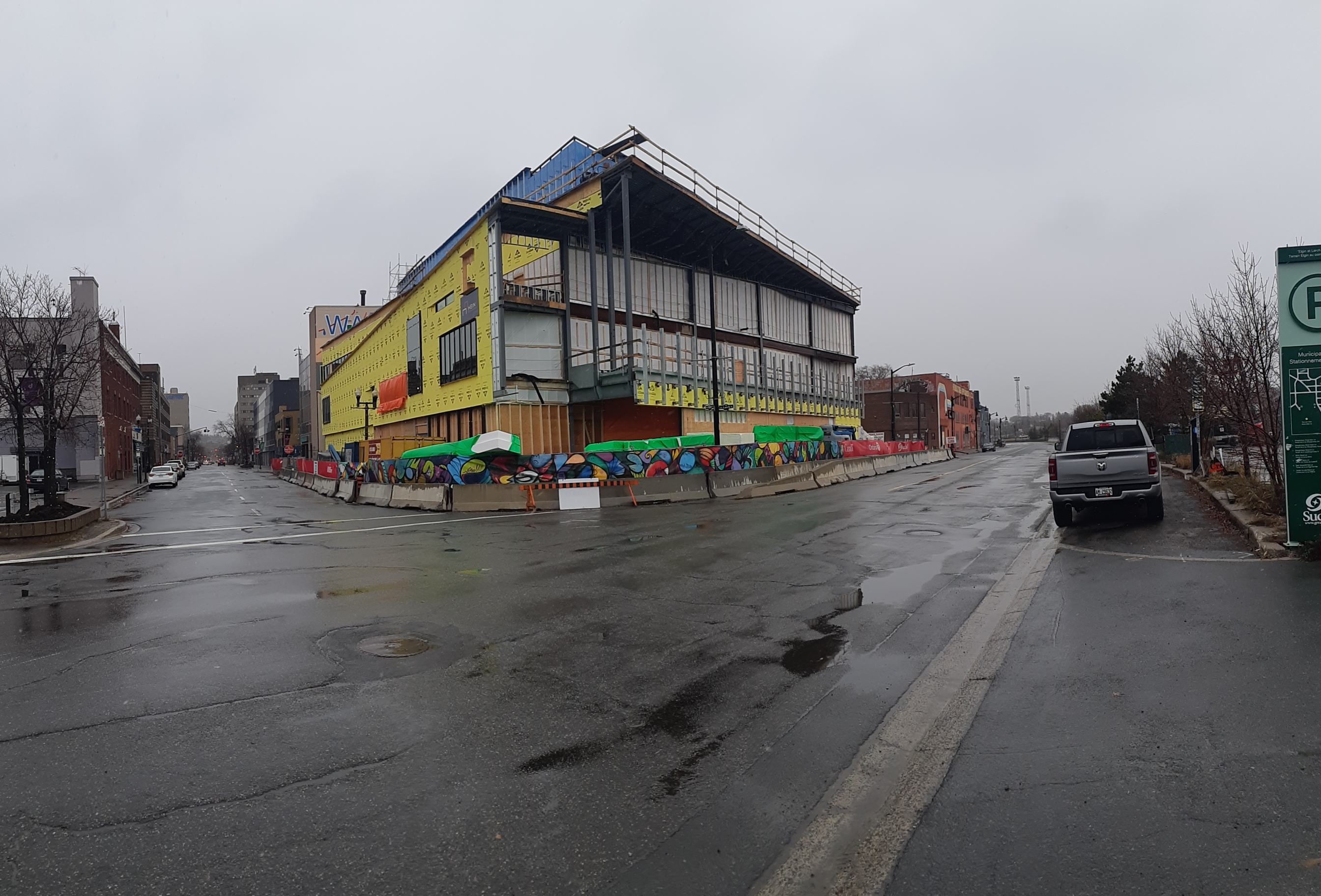
Place des Arts under construction, Nov 2020

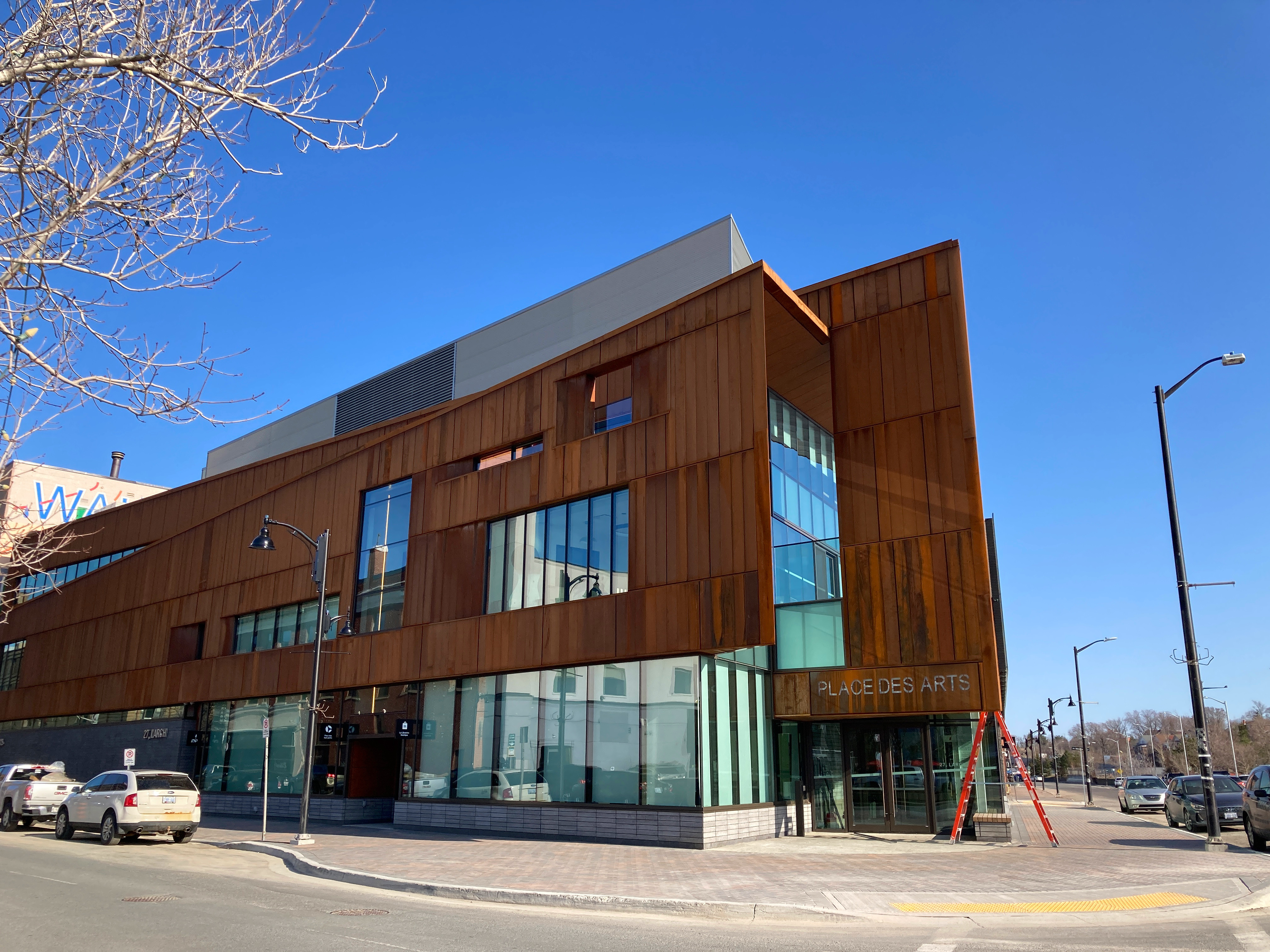
Place des Arts opening, April 2022

In 2018, the company was awarded a $30 million contract by the City of Greater Sudbury to build the 40,000-square-foot francophone arts centre Place Des Arts.

In February 2021, R.M. Bélanger Ltd was fined $210,000 after a worker was killed while working at a Greater Sudbury golf course. In July 2021, the company was fined $175,000 following the death of a construction worker in 2019. A bridge that was under construction collapsed in Marathon, Ontario. R.M. Bélanger Ltd pled guilty to not taking every precaution reasonable, breaching the Occupational Health and Safety Act.

In 2022 R.M. Bélanger Ltd was awarded a $27.9 million construction contract to rebuild part of Algonquin Boulevard in Timmins, Ontario. The contract spans three years and includes new road surface as well as the reconstruction of the water and storm drainage.

In 2022, the company was ordered by the Canadian Nuclear Safety Commission to stop using all radiation devices following its conclusion that the company had " failed to implement a radiation protection program that includes an adequate level of management oversight of work practices and personnel qualification and training."
