= Elie Martel =

Canadian politician (1934–2025)

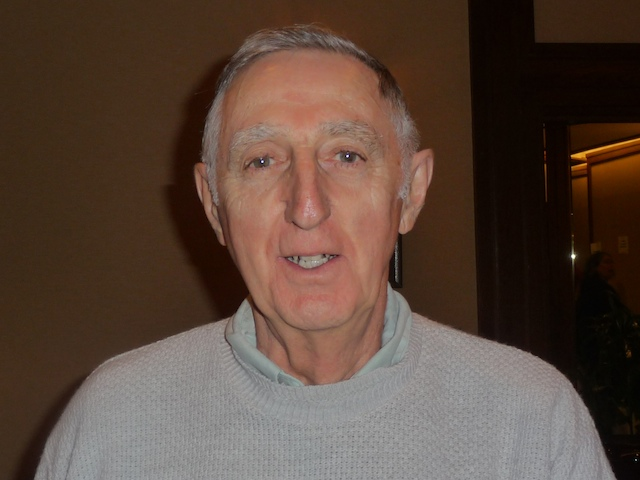
- Martel in 2009

Member of Provincial Parliament
- In office October 17, 1967 – September 9, 1987
- Preceded by: Seat established
- Succeeded by: Shelley Martel
- Constituency: Sudbury East

Personal details
- Born: Elie Walter Martel; November 26, 1934 Capreol, Ontario, Canada
- Died: August 13, 2025 (aged 90)
- Party: Ontario New Democratic
- Occupation: Teacher

Elie Walter Martel (November 26, 1934 – August 13, 2025) was a Canadian politician who served in the Legislative Assembly of Ontario from 1967 to 1987, as a member of the Ontario New Democratic Party (NDP). He represented the Sudbury East electoral district from its inception in 1967 until he retired in 1987. During the late 1970s and into the 1980s, he was the Ontario NDP's house leader. He was on the party's labour left wing and had conflicts with party leadership, including future premier Bob Rae. After he retired from politics, he served on the Ontario government's Environmental Assessment Board as one of its vice chairs. His daughter Shelley Martel took over his Sudbury East seat and continued to serve the people of Sudbury when it became the Nickel Belt electoral district at the end of the 20th century. Between her and her father, the Martels represented Sudbury at Queen's Park for 40 years. Prior to his political career, Martel was a teacher and principal in the Catholic school system in the Sudbury area.

== Background ==
Martel was born in Capreol, Ontario, into a French-speaking family and was educated at an English-speaking boarding school that forced him to stop speaking his family's native language. He quit school three times to work on the railroad, and at Inco. He finally completed secondary school and then went to Laurentian University to major in history. After university, he went to North Bay Teacher's College. He worked as a teacher and high school principal in the Sudbury area before entering politics.

His wife Gaye is the daughter of Norman Fawcett, who was Nickel Belt's federal Member of Parliament from 1965 to 1968.

== Career in politics ==
Martel was first elected to the Ontario legislature in the 1967 election, defeating Progressive Conservative candidate Cecil Fielding by 1,146 votes in the new Northern Ontario electoral district of Sudbury East. His victory happened the same year that the United Steelworkers absorbed INCO's International Union of Mine, Mill, and Smelter Workers union local 598, ending almost 20 years of very bitter political infighting between the unions and the CCF/NDP. The infighting ousted former CCF MPP, Bob Carlin because the party feared the Sudbury riding association was controlled by communists in the Mine, Mill union. Only after the Steelworkers' prolonged takeover of Mine, Mill, did the NDP finally have unity between its warring factions, thereby allowing Martel to win the seat.

He was on the left wing of the New Democratic Party, and was strongly supported by its trade-union base. In 1974, Martel supported the striking uranium miners at Elliot Lake who were demanding improved safety and support from employers. Along with other NDP legislators from the Sudbury area, he frequently called for the area's Falconbridge Ltd. and Inco's nickel mines to be nationalized.

Early in his career, Martel pressed then-education minister Bill Davis to support full funding for Catholic high schools in late 1968. As premier, Davis, in mid-June 1984, decided to fund public separate high schools, reversing his previous position going back to when Martel first brought it up in the 1960s.

Martel was re-elected by comfortable margins in the elections of 1971, 1975, 1977, 1981 and 1985, and served as an opposition member for his entire legislative career. Martel was House Leader of the NDP for seven years, from 1978 to 1985. He stepped down from that position after being left-off the NDP's negotiating team that eventually brokered the accord between the Liberals and the NDP to form a stable minority government in May 1985. NDP leader Bob Rae thought that Martel was "too much of a lone wolf," to negotiate the deal.

Martel encouraged Bob Rae to seek the provincial NDP leadership in 1981, but began developing his own organization when Rae delayed his entry. He eventually withdrew from the contest to support Rae's candidacy, but his personal and professional relationship with Rae deteriorated when the campaign was over. By some accounts, the two men strongly disliked one another on a personal level.

== Retirement ==
Martel stood down as a Member of Provincial Parliament (MPP) in 1987, and was succeeded in Sudbury East by his daughter Shelley Martel after a bitter battle for the riding's NDP nomination between her and Rev. William Major. Shortly after his retirement, Martel was named vice-chair of the Environmental Assessment Board by Liberal Premier of Ontario David Peterson.

Nearly a decade after he retired from the Ontario Legislature, he ran as a candidate for the federal New Democratic Party in the 1997 federal election. He finished second to Liberal incumbent Ray Bonin in the Nickel Belt electoral district.

The NDP won the 1990 Ontario general election and formed their first majority government. Shelley Martel was subsequently named as minister for Northern Development and government house leader. In 1998, Sudbury East was dissolved and merged into the provincial Nickel Belt electoral district for the 1999 provincial election. Shelley Martel continued to represent that constituency provincially until her retirement in 2007, ending the family's forty-year run of representing the greater Sudbury area. She was married to Howard Hampton, former leader of the Ontario New Democrats.

Martel died on August 13, 2025, at the age of 90.
