= Sudbury East =

Former provincial electoral district in Ontario, Canada

Ontario electoral district

Defunct provincial electoral district
- Legislature: Legislative Assembly of Ontario
- District created: 1967
- District abolished: 1999
- First contested: 1967
- Last contested: 1995

Demographics
- Census division(s): Sudbury District, Regional Municipality of Sudbury
- Census subdivision(s): Sudbury, Capreol, Nickel Centre, Casimir, Jennings and Appleby, Cosby, Mason and Martland, Hagar, Ratter and Dunnet

Sudbury East was a provincial electoral riding in Ontario, Canada, that was represented in the Legislative Assembly of Ontario from 1967 to 1999. It served the easternmost portion of the former city of Sudbury, the eastern portion of the Regional Municipality of Sudbury, and several rural communities to the east and southeast of the city. The riding only existed in provincial elections — for federal elections, most of Sudbury East was part of either Nickel Belt or Timiskaming—French River.

In 1999, the provincial government realigned its ridings to match the federal riding boundaries, and Sudbury East was amalgamated into the provincial Nickel Belt district. Shelley Martel, the incumbent MPP for Sudbury East prior to the 1999 election, continued to represent the region for another eight years as the MPP for Nickel Belt.

== Members of Provincial Parliament ==
Sudbury East
Assembly	Years	Member	Party
28th	1967–1971	Elie Martel	New Democratic
29th	1971–1975	Elie Martel	New Democratic
30th	1975–1977	Elie Martel	New Democratic
31st	1977–1981	Elie Martel	New Democratic
32nd	1981–1985	Elie Martel	New Democratic
33rd	1985–1987	Elie Martel	New Democratic
34th	1987–1990	Shelley Martel	New Democratic
35th	1990–1995	Shelley Martel	New Democratic
36th	1995–1999	Shelley Martel	New Democratic
Sourced from the Ontario Legislative Assembly
Merged into Nickel Belt before the 1999 election

== Election results ==
1995 Ontario general election
Party	Candidate	Votes	%	±%
New Democratic	Shelley Martel	11,236	37.09	–20.91
Liberal	Paul Ménard	9,594	31.67	+6.92
Progressive Conservative	Don Mark	8,680	28.65	+23.83
Independent	Guy G. Martin	473	1.56	–
Natural Law	William Morrison	310	1.02	–
Total valid votes		30,293	98.98	
Total rejected, unmarked and declined ballots		313	1.02	+0.37
Turnout		30,606	62.30	–8.56
Eligible voters		49,123		
New Democratic hold		Swing		–13.91
Source: Elections Ontario

1990 Ontario general election
Party	Candidate	Votes	%	±%
New Democratic	Shelley Martel	17,536	58.00	+3.03
Liberal	J. Y. Robert	7,484	24.76	–9.80
Confederation of Regions	Greg Bigger	3,754	12.42	–
Progressive Conservative	John Johnston	1,458	4.82	–5.64
Total valid votes		30,232	99.35	
Total rejected, unmarked and declined ballots		198	0.65	+0.30
Turnout		30,430	70.87	+2.66
Eligible voters		42,940		
New Democratic hold		Swing		+6.41
Source: Elections Ontario

1987 Ontario general election
Party	Candidate	Votes	%	±%
New Democratic	Shelley Martel	15,179	54.98	+0.32
Liberal	Claude Mayer	9,540	34.55	+19.57
Progressive Conservative	Gary Peck	2,890	10.47	–19.89
Total valid votes		27,609	99.65	
Total rejected ballots		96	0.35	–0.29
Turnout		27,705	68.20	+5.05
Eligible voters		40,621		
New Democratic hold		Swing		–9.63
Source: Elections Ontario

1985 Ontario general election
Party	Candidate	Votes	%	±%
New Democratic	Elie Martel	17,241	54.66	+5.45
Progressive Conservative	George McDonald	9,576	30.36	–3.03
Liberal	Edelgard Mahant	4,726	14.98	–2.42
Total valid votes		31,543	99.36	
Total rejected ballots		203	0.64	+0.30
Turnout		31,746	63.15	+4.25
Eligible voters		50,269		
New Democratic hold		Swing		+4.24
Source: Elections Ontario

1981 Ontario general election
Party	Candidate	Votes	%	±%
New Democratic	Elie Martel	13,883	49.21	–5.98
Progressive Conservative	George McDonald	9,420	33.39	+9.23
Liberal	Esther Davidson	4,909	17.40	–3.25
Total valid votes		28,212	99.66	
Total rejected ballots		97	0.34	+0.11
Turnout		28,309	58.90	–4.90
Eligible voters		48,063		
New Democratic hold		Swing		–7.60
Source: Elections Ontario

1977 Ontario general election
Party	Candidate	Votes	%	±%
New Democratic	Elie Martel	15,991	55.19	–3.65
Progressive Conservative	Michael Hopkins	7,001	24.16	+12.13
Liberal	Garrett Lacey	5,984	20.65	–8.48
Total valid votes		28,976	99.76	
Total rejected ballots		69	0.24	+0.03
Turnout		29,045	63.80	–10.20
Eligible voters		45,527		
New Democratic hold		Swing		–7.89
Source: Elections Ontario

1975 Ontario general election
Party	Candidate	Votes	%	±%
New Democratic	Elie Martel	18,765	58.84	+5.22
Liberal	Ron Horeck	9,289	29.13	+4.72
Progressive Conservative	Ray Plourde	3,837	12.03	–9.95
Total valid votes		31,891	99.79	
Total rejected ballots		66	0.21	–0.23
Turnout		31,957	74.00	+2.31
Eligible voters		43,185		
New Democratic hold		Swing		+0.25
Source: Elections Ontario

1971 Ontario general election
Party	Candidate	Votes	%	±%
New Democratic	Elie Martel	15,522	53.62	+16.56
Liberal	Ted A. Beauparlant	7,065	24.40	–5.86
Progressive Conservative	Oscar Moreau	6,363	21.98	–9.11
Total valid votes		28,950	99.56	
Total rejected ballots		128	0.44	–0.53
Turnout		29,078	71.69	–1.21
Eligible voters		40,559		
New Democratic hold		Swing		+11.21
Source: Elections Ontario

1967 Ontario general election
Party	Candidate	Votes	%
New Democratic	Elie Martel	7,454	37.06
Progressive Conservative	Cecil Fielding	6,254	31.09
Liberal	Michael Solski	6,088	30.27
Social Credit	Don Land	319	1.59
Total valid votes		20,115	99.03
Total rejected ballots		197	0.97
Turnout		20,312	72.90
Eligible voters		27,863	
New Democratic pickup new district.			
Source: Elections Ontario

== Other usages ==
The name Sudbury East is still used to refer collectively to the municipalities east and southeast of the city which were formerly part of the riding but are not part of the current city of Greater Sudbury, including Markstay-Warren, St. Charles and French River. These towns, as well as the adjacent municipality of Killarney and the unorganized townships of Burwash, Cox, Davis, Hawley, Hendrie, Henry, Janes, Laura, Loughrin, Secord, Servos, Street and Waldie, coordinate economic development and planning through the cooperative Sudbury East Planning Board.

In unofficial usage, the designation may also be extended to include the municipality of West Nipissing, particularly the community of Sturgeon Falls, although West Nipissing is not officially part of the Sudbury East area.

== See also ==
- List of Ontario provincial electoral districts
- Canadian provincial electoral districts
