= Graeme S. Mount =

Canadian historian and academic (26 July 1939 - 22 July 2025)

Graeme Stewart Mount 26 July 1939 – 22 July 2025) is a Canadian historian and academic who taught history at Laurentian University in Sudbury, Ontario, until his retirement in 2005. His publications have included a number of works on international relations, including several books on Canada-United States relations, the Caribbean, and historic sites in Northern Ontario, including Fort St. Joseph.

Mount took his B.A. at McGill University and his MA and doctoral degrees at the University of Toronto.

== Bibliography ==
- A History of St. Andrew's United Church, Sudbury (1982, with Michael J. Mulloy)
- Presbyterian Missions to Trinidad and Puerto Rico - The Canadian Presbyterian Mission to Trinidad and the Mission of the Presbyterian Church in the USA to Puerto Rico: The Formative Years, 1868-1914 (1983)
- An Introduction to Canadian-American Relations (1984, with Edelgard Mahant)
- The Sudbury Region: An Illustrated History (1986)
- An Introduction to Canadian-American Relations (second edition, 1989, with Edelgard Mahant)
- Canada's Enemies: Spies and Spying in the Peaceable Kingdom (1993)
- The Border at Sault Ste Marie (1995, with John Abbott and Michael J. Mulloy)
- The Caribbean Basin: An International History (1998, with Stephen J. Randall)
- Invisible and Inaudible in Washington: American Policies toward Canada during the Cold War (1999, with Edelgard Mahant)
- A History of Fort St. Joseph (2000, with John Abbott and Michael J. Mulloy)
- The Foreign Relations of Trinidad and Tobago: 1962-2000 (2001, with Basdeo Sahadeo)
- Chile and the Nazis (Montreal: Black Rose Books, 2002)
- The Diplomacy of War; The Case of Korea (Montreal: Black Rose Books, 2004)
- 895 Days That Changed the World : the Presidency of Gerald R. Ford (Montreal: Black Rose Books, 2006)
- Come On Over!: Northeastern Ontario A to Z (Latitude 46 Publishing, 2011, with Dieter K. Buse)
- Untold: Northeastern Ontario's Military Past, Volume 1, 1662- World War 1 (Latitude 46 Publishing, 2018, with Dieter K. Buse)
- Untold: Northeastern Ontario's Military Past, Volume 2, World War II - Peacekeeping (Latitude 46 Publishing, 2019, with Dieter K. Buse)
- Historic Pictures: Photos of Places in Transition (Tellwell Talent, 2025)
- The Presbyterian Church in the USA and American Rule in Puerto Rico, 1898-1917, Journal of Presbyterian History (1962-1985) 57, no. 1 (1979), 51 - 64.
