= Equal Voice =

- Abbreviation: EV
- Formation: 2001
- Type: Women's organization
- Legal status: active
- Purpose: advocate and public voice, educator and network
- Headquarters: Ottawa, Ontario
- Region served: Canada
- Official language: English; French
- Website: Equal Voice

Founded in 2001 by Rosemary Speirs, Donna Dasko, Libby Burnham and Christina McCall. Equal Voice is a national, bilingual, multi-partisan, non-governmental, non-profit organization that promotes the election of more women to all levels of Canadian politics. Through public awareness campaigns, campaign schools, research, election tracking, and lobbying political parties, Equal Voice seeks to increase the numbers of women elected to public office federally, provincially and municipally.

== Electing women in Canada: challenges and strategies ==
In order to ensure that more women are elected in Canada, it is critical that Canada’s political parties adopt action plans to break down barriers for women in politics. Equal Voice encourages the Liberal Party of Canada, the Conservative Party of Canada, the New Democratic Party, the Bloc Québécois and the Green Party of Canada, to be proactive in their recruitment and support of women candidates.

Equal Voice promotes the election of more women by:

- Working with all political parties to increase the nominations of women candidates;
- Promoting electoral and other changes that would increase the numbers of women in politics;
- Conducting outreach with young women to inspire and engage them in politics as a future career choice;
- Encouraging women to run for office;
- Research and election tracking;
- Raising awareness about the impact of women's under-representation;
- Celebrating women in politics; and
- Hosting events across Canada, including campaign schools and other events aimed to equip and support women in politics.

== Regional and youth chapters ==
Equal Voice Chapters and University Campus Clubs aim to increase public awareness about the underrepresentation of women in politics by hosting events and providing networking and mentoring opportunities across Canada. In order to found a chapter, leaders must prove they support a multi-partisan approach to promoting the cause of electing more women in politics. Chapters must be devoted solely to the cause of electing more women. There are currently chapters in the National Capital Region (NCR), Toronto, Alberta South, Alberta North, Nova Scotia, New Brunswick, and Newfoundland and Labrador. In addition to regional chapters, there are student chapters at: The University of McGill, The University of Ottawa, Carleton University and York University, with chapters quickly emerging across the country.

== Daughters of the Vote ==
On International Women's Day 2017, Equal Voice held its inaugural Daughters of the Vote (DOV) program in Ottawa, Ontario. The program was created to promote the participation of women in politics and government, and was funded by corporate sponsors and the federal Department for the Status of Women. 338 young women, aged 18 to 23, from each federal riding in Canada were selected to take part in a once-in-a-lifetime political leadership program hosted by Equal Voice. Delegates sat in the House of Commons for a historic sitting of the Chamber and were addressed by every federal party leader.

On October 3, the Minister for the Status of Women, Maryam Monsef, announced an investment of $3.8 million to support Equal Voice's Daughters of the Vote program, over three years.

The second iteration of the program took place from April 1-4, 2019. The four-day program consisted of workshops, hands-on training, panels and presentations, as well as opportunities for the 338 delegates to network with elected officials at all levels of government, from all political parties. Several participants turned their backs when Prime Minister Justin Trudeau spoke in response to his alleged mistreatment of several female politicians during the SNC-Lavalin affair. Some of the delegates also walked out of a speech by then Conservative Leader Andrew Scheer.

Due to the COVID-19 pandemic, the third edition of the program took place virtually from March 5-8, 2021 for the first time ever. The conference had 400 people participating, including delegates, Elders, panelists, partnering organizations, sponsors, and leaders from every federal political party in Canada. A third event is likely to take place in the spring of 2023.

In past sessions, DOV delegates were eligible to apply for a Rosemary Speirs Community Grant, in order to financially support them in realizing beneficial initiatives in their communities. The Community Grant is named in honour of Dr. Rosemary Speirs, a founder of Equal Voice.

== Systemic Change ==
Equal Voice is currently working on a nationwide multi-partisan initiative to address some of the systemic barriers within legislatures and Parliament that contribute to the under-representation of women in politics at the provincial, territorial, and federal levels in Canada. Funded by the Department for Women and Gender Equality, this project produced recommendations for change that would improve legislatures and encourage the election and retention of more women in politics. Examples range from the creation of formal policies within legislatures, such as a maternity and/or parental leave policy and/or harassment policy, to changes to standing orders, childcare access, predictable sitting calendars, and the modernization of Parliament, such as e-voting.

Equal Voice provided research and advice to multiple provincial legislatures and political parties, and testified at the federal Standing Committee on Human Resources, Skills and Social Development and the Status of Persons with Disabilities on Bill C-65, an act to amend the Canada Labour Code in regard to harassment and violence, the Parliamentary Employment and Staff Relations Act, and the Budget Implementation Act, 2017, No. 1.

== Elections ==
Equal Voice provides data and analysis during, and following, provincial and federal elections. In 2019, they also provided a first-of-its kind directory of women running for all major political parties in the federal election, and blog content from prominent women in Canadian politics.

In 2019, Equal Voice reported it was optimistic about reaching the 30% mark for women's representation in the House of Commons. However, on October 21, 2019, just 98 women were elected to the House of Commons, up from 88 in 2015, falling short of the 102 needed to hit 30%.

== EVE and Catalyst for Change Awards ==
Annually, Equal Voice honours two outstanding politicians for their contributions to advancing women in public life. Recipients are chosen by the Equal Voice Board of Directors.

The EVE award is given to an outstanding women in politics, whereas the Catalyst for Change award is granted to a man in political leadership that has made strides in elevating the role of women in public life.

Previous Eve Award recipients include the Right Honourable Kim Campbell, the Honourable Anne McLellan, the Honourable Leona Aglukkaq, Member of Parliament Carolyn Bennett, former Member of Parliament and federal cabinet minister Flora MacDonald, Mississauga Mayor Hazel McCallion, former Ontario cabinet minister Frances Lankin and the Hon. Belinda Stronach.

Previous Catalyst for Change award recipients include The Right Honourable Justin Trudeau, Jack Layton, The Right Honourable Brian Mulroney, and The Right Honourable Jean Chretien.

== Past Programs ==
Launched on International Women's Day (2010), "Be Her or Support Her" is an action campaign created to galvanize women into being the candidate or support another woman to do so. Members can take part in this specific campaign by taking individual action, through community initiatives, or by political party action. This includes running for election, donating money to help fundraise for women politicians, holding an event, joining a riding association, and celebrate existing women candidates and men who support the cause of electing more women to political office.

Equal Voice Experiences is a national mentorship program funded by Status of Women Canada which aims to engage girls and young women between the ages of 12 and 25 to learn about the impact of politics on their lives and how they might become involved in the process.

The Canada Challenge is intended to promote change among political parties to elect more women in Canada. In May 2009, EV launched its second Canada Challenge, where in anticipation of the next federal election, Equal Voice secured the commitment of the five federal party leaders to nominate more women to run for their parties. This resulted in an increase in the numbers of women nominated and elected in 2011, from 22 percent of parliament after the 2008 election to 25 percent of parliament after the 2011 election.

The Ontario Challenge was created to help elect more women to Queen’s Park. In 2006, Equal Voice asked the leaders of the Ontario Progressive Conservative Party, Liberals and New Democratic Party to commit to nominating more female candidates. All three party leaders agreed to take up the Challenge, and as a result, the number of women elected to Queen’s Park in one election cycle increased by 7 per cent overall.

Getting to the Gate Online Campaign School is an online campaign school that provides practical tools for women of all ages, backgrounds and walks of life interested in running for public office in order to boost women’s participation in all levels of government. The course is led by Equal Voice and funded by Status and Women Canada, and was made possible by the contributions of many individuals and organizations.

== Advisory board members ==
- Kim Campbell, former Progressive Conservative Prime Minister
- Pat Carney, Conservative Senator
- Sheila Copps, former Liberal Deputy Prime Minister
- Janet Ecker, former Progressive Conservative Party of Ontario MPP
- Judy Erola, former Liberal MP
- Barbara Hall, former Mayor of Toronto
- Audrey McLaughlin, former NDP leader
- Lyn McLeod, former leader of the Ontario Liberal Party
- Anita Neville, Liberal MP
- Flora MacDonald, former Progressive Conservative MP
- Lucie Pépin, Liberal Senator
- Nancy Ruth, Conservative Senator
