= Marc Serré =

Canadian politician (born 1967)

Member of Parliament for Nickel Belt
- In office October 19, 2015 – March 23, 2025
- Preceded by: Claude Gravelle
- Succeeded by: Jim Belanger

Personal details
- Born: January 27, 1967 (age 59) Chelmsford, Ontario, Canada,
- Party: Liberal
- Parent(s): Jeannine Serré & Gaetan Serré
- Education: Laurentian University
- Website: https://voteserre.ca

Marc G. Serré (born January 28, 1967) is a former Liberal Member of Parliament for Nickel Belt. He was first elected in 2015, and re-elected in 2019 and 2021, but was defeated in 2025 by Jim Belanger. He is the son of Gaetan Serré, who represented Nickel Belt from 1968 to 1972 under the government of Pierre Trudeau, and the nephew of another former Liberal Member of Parliament Benoît Serré.

Prior to his election to the House of Commons, Serré was manager of business services for EastLink's operations in Ontario, and served on the municipal council of West Nipissing and the Conseil scolaire de district catholique du Nouvel-Ontario. He was a candidate for mayor of Greater Sudbury in the 2010 municipal election, but withdrew his candidacy in advance of election day.

In the House of Commons he served as Parliamentary Secretary. He was also the co-chair of the Indigenous Caucus with MP Robert-Falcon Ouellette. He was part of the largest Indigenous caucus in Canadian history elected in 2015.

In the 2025 Canadian federal election, he contested the new riding of Sudbury East—Manitoulin—Nickel Belt. In an upset he was defeated by Conservative candidate Jim Belanger by 5,007 votes.

At the time of the 2025 Canadian federal election, he lived in Verner, Ontario.

== Offices and roles as a parliamentarian ==
42nd	Parliamentary Secretary to the Minister of Rural Economic Development	January 29, 2019	September 11, 2019
43rd	Parliamentary Secretary to the Minister of Natural Resources	March 19, 2021	August 15, 2021
44th	Parliamentary Secretary to the Minister of Official Languages	December 3, 2021	November 30, 2022
44th	Parliamentary Secretary to the Minister of Official Languages	December 1, 2022	September 17, 2023
44th	Parliamentary Secretary to the Minister of Energy and Natural Resources and to the Minister of Official Languages	September 18, 2023	February 21, 2025
44th	Parliamentary Secretary to the Minister of Energy and Natural Resources	September 18, 2023	March 23, 2025
44th	Member of the Joint Interparliamentary Council	December 3, 2021	March 23, 2025

== Electoral record ==
2025 Canadian federal election: Sudbury East—Manitoulin—Nickel Belt
** Preliminary results — Not yet official **
Party	Candidate	Votes	%	±%	Expenditures
Conservative	Jim Belanger	29,129	48.33	+21.42	
Liberal	Marc G. Serré	24,122	40.03	+8.05	
New Democratic	Andréane Chénier	4,818	7.99	–22.35	
People's	Sharilynne St. Louis	1,423	2.36	–6.54	
Green	Himal Hossain	453	0.75	-0.98	
Libertarian	Justin Dean Newell Leroux	321	0.53	N/A	
Total valid votes/expense limit					
Total rejected ballots					
Turnout		60,266	70.11		
Eligible voters		85,955			
Conservative notional gain from Liberal		Swing		+6.69	
Source: Elections Canada

2021 Canadian federal election: Nickel Belt
Party	Candidate	Votes	%	±%
Liberal	Marc Serré	17,353	35.2	-3.8
Conservative	Charles Humphrey	13,425	27.2	+6.0
New Democratic	Andréane Chénier	13,137	26.6	-8.6
People's	David Hobbs	4,558	9.2	+6.8
Green	Craig Gravelle	848	1.7	-3.7
Total valid votes		49,321		
Total rejected ballots		364		
Turnout		49,685	63.84	
Eligible voters		77,823		
Source: Elections Canada

2019 Canadian federal election: Nickel Belt
Party	Candidate	Votes	%	±%	Expenditures
Liberal	Marc Serré	19,046	38.99	-3.81	$96,428.93
New Democratic	Stéphane Paquette	15,656	32.05	-5.73	$18,983.01
Conservative	Aino Laamanen	10,343	21.17	+4.43	$7,684.88
Green	Casey Lalonde	2,644	5.41	+2.93	none listed
People's	Mikko Paavola	1,159	2.37	–	none listed
Total valid votes/expense limit		48,848	99.39		
Total rejected ballots		298	0.61	+0.22	
Turnout		49,146	64.17	-2.94	
Eligible voters		76,585			
Liberal hold		Swing		+0.96	
Source: Elections Canada

2015 Canadian federal election: Nickel Belt
Party	Candidate	Votes	%	±%	Expenditures
Liberal	Marc Serré	21,021	42.80	+28.74	$39,869.30
New Democratic	Claude Gravelle	18,556	37.78	-17.20	$94,855.24
Conservative	Aino Laamanen	8,221	16.74	-11.29	$14,060.79
Green	Stuart McCall	1,217	2.48	-0.31	$3,772.22
Marxist–Leninist	Dave Starbuck	98	0.20	+0.07	–
Total valid votes/Expense limit		49,113	100.00		$233,625.58
Total rejected ballots		192	0.39	–	
Turnout		49,305	67.70	–	
Eligible voters		72,828			
Liberal gain from New Democratic		Swing		+22.97	
Source: Elections Canada
