= Osias Godin =

Canadian politician (1911–1988)

Member of Parliament for Nickel Belt
- In office May 12, 1958 – September 8, 1965
- Preceded by: Léo Gauthier
- Succeeded by: Norman Fawcett

Personal details
- Born: May 6, 1911 Verner, Ontario, Canada
- Died: April 20, 1988 (aged 76)
- Party: Liberal
- Occupation: Lawyer

Osias Godin (May 6, 1911 – April 20, 1988) was a Canadian politician, who represented the riding of Nickel Belt in the House of Commons of Canada from 1958 to 1965. He was a member of the Liberal Party of Canada.

Prior to his election to the House of Commons, Godin was a lawyer and city councillor in Sudbury.
