= Sudbury Downs =

Harness racing track in Greater Sudbury, Canada

Coordinates: 46°35′28″N 81°08′23″W

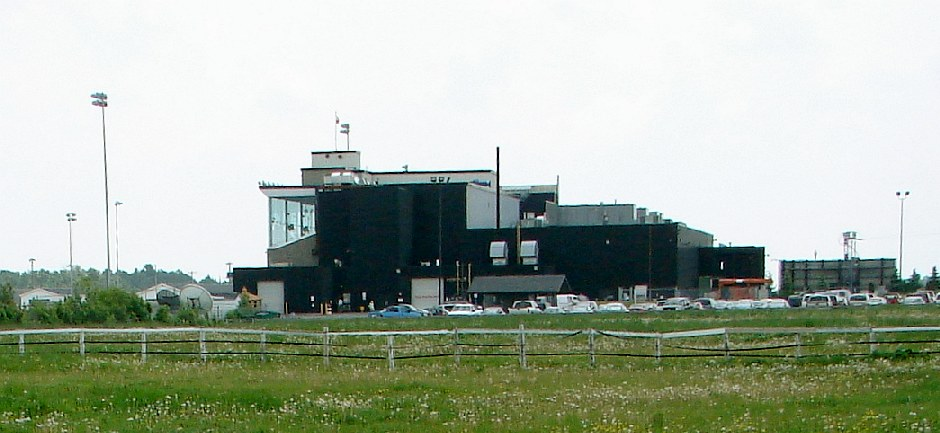
Sudbury Downs

Sudbury Downs was a harness racing track located in Greater Sudbury, Ontario, Canada, on Bonin Road between the communities of Azilda and Chelmsford. Sudbury Downs held its last day of live racing on October 30, 2013. After Ontario cut betting revenue to the racecourse, the track decided to close as it could not find a profitable business model.

== Casino operations ==
A casino operated by Gateway Casinos has been located at Sudbury Downs in the community of Chelmsford since November 26, 1999. The facility marked its 25th anniversary at the site in December 2024.

In August 2025, Gateway Casinos announced plans to relocate its Sudbury-area operations from the Sudbury Downs site to a new location, citing modernization and long-term development considerations. Gateway Casinos has purchased land for a future relocation of the casino.

== Location history ==
Sudbury Downs was built on the farm of Médéric Bonin, which was settled in the mid 19th century by the Bonin family. The track is located in Boninville, which has now been amalgamated with Greater Sudbury. The history of this location can still be seen in places around Sudbury Downs. The land and its surrounding was transformed from a dense, Northern Ontario hardwood forest into farmland for much of the 19th century.
