= Whitewater Lake =

Lake in Sudbury, Ontario, Canada

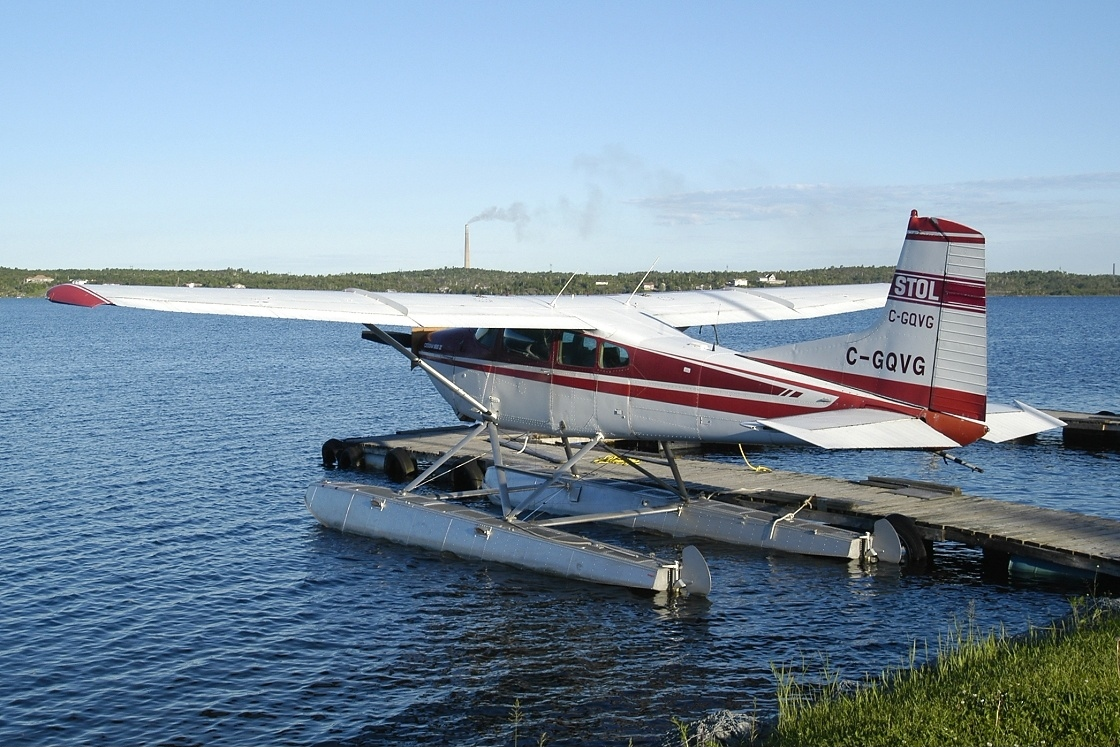
- Sudbury/Azilda Water Aerodrome on Whitewater Lake

- Location within Ontario
- Location: Sudbury, Ontario
- Coordinates: 46.5335°N 81.13043°W
- Primary outflows: Levey Creek
- Basin countries: Canada
- Max. length: 7 km (4.3 mi)
- Max. width: 3 km (1.9 mi)
- Surface area: 9.49 km^{2} (3.66 sq mi)
- Max. depth: 11 m (36 ft)

Whitewater Lake is a lake in the city of Sudbury, Ontario. The community of Azilda borders its eastern shore.

The lake is host to a number of amateur fishing tournaments, and it was the site of an annual powerboat racing championship. It is the site of the Sudbury/Azilda Water Aerodrome, which supports a number of aircraft capable of landing on water. During the winter months, a village of ice huts forms on the lake near Azilda's Centennial Park.

Most of the lake is less than 1.5 m (4 ft 11 in) deep (and dangerous for boaters who are unfamiliar with it). Its maximum depth is 11 m (36 ft).

== Ecology ==
There are 9 documented species of fish in Whitewater Lake:

- Brown Bullhead
- Lake Herring (Cisco)
- Golden Shiner
- Northern Pike
- Pumpkinseed
- Smallmouth Bass
- Walleye
- White Sucker
- Yellow Perch

There are 22 documented aquatic plants in Whitewater Lake:

- Broadleaf arrowhead
- Cattail
- Duckweed
- Flat-stemmed pondweed
- Floating arrowhead
- Floating-leaved burreed
- Floating-leaved pondweed
- Hardstem bulrush
- Large-fruited burreed
- Large-leaved pondweed
- Northern water milfoil
- Pickerelweed
- Richardson's pondweed
- Sago pondweed
- Slender pondweed
- Sweet flag (Calamus)
- Water marigold
- Water plantain
- Water smartweed
- White water lily
- Wild celery (Tape Grass)
- Yellow pond lily
