= Gaetan Serré =

Canadian politician (1938–2017)

MP for Nickel Belt
- In office 1968–1972
- Preceded by: Norman Fawcett
- Succeeded by: John Rodriguez

Personal details
- Born: January 24, 1938 Sturgeon Falls, Ontario, Canada
- Died: November 24, 2017 (aged 79) Sturgeon Falls, Ontario, Canada
- Party: Liberal
- Occupation: Teacher

Gaetan-Joseph Serré (January 24, 1938 – November 24, 2017) was a Canadian politician, who represented the riding of Nickel Belt in the House of Commons of Canada from 1968 to 1972. He was a member of the Liberal Party.

Serré won the riding in 1968, defeating New Democrat Norman Fawcett. He served a single term, losing the riding in the next election to another New Democrat candidate, John Rodriguez.

Serré subsequently returned to teaching. In 2003, he launched a new Voice over Internet Protocol (VoIP) telephone business in Sturgeon Falls with his daughter Lynne Gervais and son Marc Serré. PhoneNet Communications was sold to Unitz Online in 2005.

His younger brother Benoît Serré served in the House of Commons from 1993 to 2004, and his son Marc was elected to the House of Commons in the 2015 federal election as MP for Nickel Belt.

Serré died of cancer on November 24, 2017, at the age of 79.

== Election results ==
1972 Canadian federal election: Nickel Belt
Party	Candidate	Votes	%	±%
New Democratic	John Rodriguez	14,033	46.03	+8.46
Liberal	Gaetan Serré	12,101	39.69	−5.41
Progressive Conservative	Bernie White	3,817	12.52	−4.81
Social Credit	Donat Breault	534	1.75	
Total valid votes		30,485	100.00	
Total rejected ballots		4,718		
Turnout		35,203	79.01	
Electors on the lists		44,556		
Note: The number of rejected ballots is not a misprint. Gaetan Serré initially called for these ballots to be reviewed, but withdrew his request on November 14, 1972 after viewing a sample. Source: "Review cancelled", Globe and Mail, 14 November 1972, 8. Source for results: Official Voting Results, Office of the Chief Electoral Officer (Canada), 1972.

1968 Canadian federal election
Party	Candidate	Votes	%	±%
Liberal	Gaetan Serré	11,551	45.10	+5.64
New Democratic	Norman Fawcett	9,621	37.57	-3.75
Progressive Conservative	Cecil Fielding	4,439	17.33	+19.23
Total valid votes		25,611	100.00	
