= Jim Bélanger =

Canadian politician

Jim Bélanger MP

Member of Parliament for Sudbury East—Manitoulin—Nickel Belt
- Incumbent
- Assumed office April 28, 2025
- Preceded by: Marc Serré

Personal details
- Party: Conservative
- Other political affiliations: Liberal (previously)

Jim Bélanger MP is a Canadian politician from the Conservative Party of Canada. He was elected Member of Parliament for Sudbury East—Manitoulin—Nickel Belt defeating Marc G. Serre in the 2025 Canadian federal election. He became Manitoulin's first Conservative MP since 1935.

== Career ==
Bélanger is a self-employed petroleum wholesaler and delivery worker. He is a member of the Standing Committee on Official Languages.

Bélanger applied to run for the Liberals in the 2015 Canadian federal election. Marc Serre was selected instead.

In late 2025, to quell speculation that he was among the Conservative MPs considering leaving the party, Bélanger released a video statement reaffirming his commitment to the party.

== Early life ==
His great grandmother, Azilda Bélanger, was the namesake for the town of Azilda.

== Electoral record ==
2025 Canadian federal election: Sudbury East—Manitoulin—Nickel Belt
** Preliminary results — Not yet official **
Party	Candidate	Votes	%	±%	Expenditures
Conservative	Jim Belanger	29,129	48.33	+21.42	
Liberal	Marc G. Serré	24,122	40.03	+8.05	
New Democratic	Andréane Chénier	4,818	7.99	–22.35	
People's	Sharilynne St. Louis	1,423	2.36	–6.54	
Green	Himal Hossain	453	0.75	-0.98	
Libertarian	Justin Dean Newell Leroux	321	0.53	N/A	
Total valid votes/expense limit					
Total rejected ballots					
Turnout		60,266	70.11		
Eligible voters		85,955			
Conservative notional gain from Liberal		Swing		+6.69	
Source: Elections Canada
