= Claude Gravelle =

Canadian politician (born 1949)

Shadow Minister for Natural Resources
- In office October 1, 2011 – April 18, 2012
- Leader: Nycole Turmel
- Preceded by: Romeo Saganash
- Succeeded by: Peter Julian

Member of Parliament for Nickel Belt
- In office October 14, 2008 – August 4, 2015
- Preceded by: Ray Bonin
- Succeeded by: Marc Serré

Personal details
- Born: October 26, 1949 (age 76) Sudbury, Ontario
- Party: New Democratic Party
- Spouse: Marie-Claire Breton
- Profession: machinist, labour union organizer

Claude Gravelle (born October 26, 1949) is a former Canadian politician, first elected to represent the electoral district of Nickel Belt in the 2008 Canadian federal election. He is a member of the New Democratic Party and was defeated in the 2015 Canadian federal election

Gravelle is a retired machinist and union organizer at Inco's mining operations in Sudbury, where he was a member of the United Steelworkers union. Gravelle first entered politics in 1997 on the town council of Rayside-Balfour. He did not run for re-election to Greater Sudbury City Council following the municipal amalgamation in the 2000 municipal election, but became co-chair of the Rayside-Balfour community action network. He ran for re-election to city council in the 2003 municipal election, but was not elected.

Gravelle ran as the federal New Democratic Party candidate in Nickel Belt in the 2004 and 2006 federal elections, losing narrowly to incumbent MP Ray Bonin both times. He won the riding in 2008 following Bonin's retirement, easily beating the new Liberal candidate, former city councillor Louise Portelance. In 2015, he lost to Liberal challenger Marc Serré.

== Electoral record ==
2015 Canadian federal election: Nickel Belt
| Party | Candidate | Votes | % | ±% | Expenditures |
|---|---|---|---|---|---|
| Liberal | Marc Serré | 21,021 | 42.80 | +28.74 | $39,869.30 |
| New Democratic | Claude Gravelle | 18,556 | 37.78 | -17.20 | $94,855.24 |
| Conservative | Aino Laamanen | 8,221 | 16.74 | -11.29 | $14,060.79 |
| Green | Stuart McCall | 1,217 | 2.48 | -0.31 | $3,772.22 |
| Marxist–Leninist | Dave Starbuck | 98 | 0.20 | +0.07 | – |
| Total valid votes/Expense limit | | 49,113 | 100.00 | | $233,625.58 |
| Total rejected ballots | | 192 | 0.39 | – | |
| Turnout | | 49,305 | 67.70 | – | |
| Eligible voters | | 72,828 | | | |
| Liberal gain from New Democratic | | Swing | | +22.97 | |
Source: Elections Canada

2008 Canadian federal election
| Party | Candidate | Votes | % | ±% |
|---|---|---|---|---|
| New Democratic | Claude Gravelle | 19,019 | 46.5% | |
| Liberal | Louise Portelance | 10,713 | 26.2% | |
| Conservative | Ian McCracken | 8,851 | 21.7% | |
| Green | Fred Twilley | 2,050 | 5.0% | |
| Marxist–Leninist | Steve Rutchinski | 125 | 0.3% | |
| Independent | Yves Villeneuve | 115 | 0.3% | |
| Total valid votes | | 40,873 | | |
| Total rejected ballots | | – | | |
| Turnout | | 40,873 | 57.9% | |

2006 Canadian federal election
| Party | Candidate | Votes |
|---|---|---|
| Liberal | Ray Bonin | 19,775 |
| New Democratic | Claude Gravelle | 17,668 |
| Conservative | Margaret Schwartzentruber | 5,822 |
| Progressive Canadian | Mathieu Péron | 1,044 |
| Green | Mark McAllister | 975 |
| Marijuana | Michel D. Ethier | 421 |
| Marxist–Leninist | Steve Rutchinski | 42 |

2004 Canadian federal election
| Party | Candidate | Votes |
|---|---|---|
| Liberal | Ray Bonin | 17,188 |
| New Democratic | Claude Gravelle | 13,980 |
| Conservative | Mike Dupont | 7,628 |
| Green | Steve Lafleur | 1,031 |
| Marijuana | Michel D. Ethier | 430 |
| Independent | Don Lavallee | 217 |
| Marxist–Leninist | Steve Rutchinski | 51 |
