= Rayside-Balfour =

Coordinates: 46.5686°N 81.1533°W

- Dissolved municipality (lower-tier)
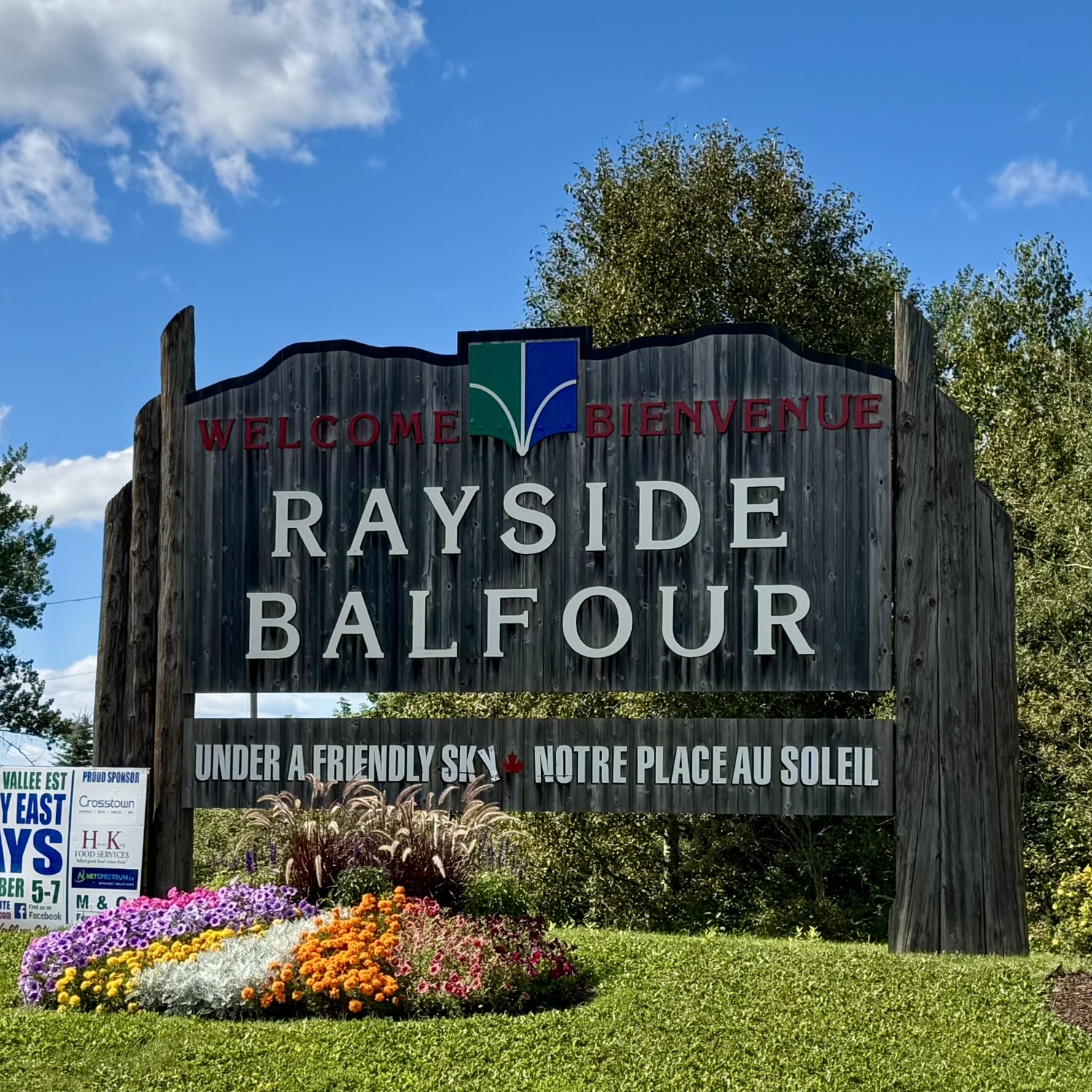

- Location of Rayside-Balfour (red) compared to the rest of the Sudbury Region until 2000.
- Country: Canada
- Province: Ontario
- City: Greater Sudbury
- Ward: 3, 4
- Incorporated: January 1, 1973
- Dissolved: December 31, 2000

Government
  - City Councillor: Michel Guy Brabant, Pauline Fortin
  - Governing Body: Greater Sudbury City Council
  - MPs: Jim Belanger (Conservative)
  - MPPs: France Gélinas (NDP)

Population (2011)Statistics Canada
  - Total: 14,557
- Population computed by combining Census Tracts 5800160.00, 5800161.01, 5800161.02 and 5800162.00
- Time zone: UTC-5 (EST)
  - Summer (DST): UTC-4 (EDT)
- Postal Code FSA: P0M
- Area code: 705
- Website: Rayside-Balfour Community Action Network

Rayside-Balfour (1996 census population 16,050) was a town in Ontario, Canada, which existed from 1973 to 2000. It is now part of the city of Greater Sudbury.

The town was created as part of the Regional Municipality of Sudbury and took its name from the townships of Rayside and Balfour, which fell within the boundaries of the new town; prior to the town's creation in 1973, Rayside and Balfour were separately incorporated as township municipalities.

Although the Regional Municipality of Sudbury was a very important centre of Franco-Ontarian population and culture, Rayside-Balfour was the only town in the regional municipality which had a majority francophone population. It remains as such still today.

== History ==
On January 1, 2001, the town and the Regional Municipality were dissolved and amalgamated into the city of Greater Sudbury. The Rayside-Balfour area is now divided between Wards 3 and 4 on Greater Sudbury City Council.

In 2006, there was interest in the deamalgamation of the former town of Rayside-Balfour from the City of Greater Sudbury. However, since any referendum on the matter would require the consent of the provincial government, such a move is unlikely to take place.

In the Canada 2011 Census, the entire main populated core of Rayside-Balfour was counted as part of the population centre (or urban area) of Sudbury, with no separate population statistics published for the Rayside-Balfour area alone. However, the four census tracts corresponding to the former Rayside-Balfour had a total population of 14,557. For the Canada 2016 Census, Chelmsford and Azilda were removed from the Sudbury population centre and designated as separate population centres, with Azilda having a population of 4,663 and Chelmsford 6,215. The latest population trends show an increase in Azilda, while Chelmsford's population remains relatively stable.

== Communities ==
=== Azilda ===
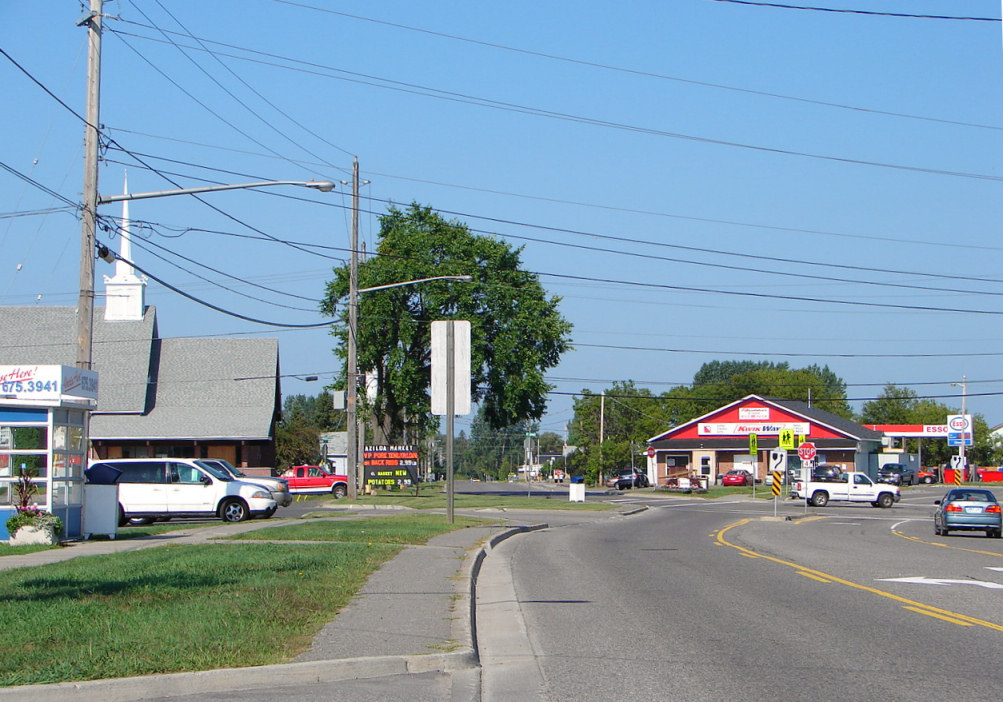
Azilda

Azilda gets its name from Azilda Bélanger (née Brisebois), the first female pioneer of the area and wife of Joseph Bélanger, mayor of Rayside from 1899 to 1900 and again in 1905. She was well known in the town, especially for her healing abilities. The town had originally applied for the name Ste-Azilda until it was realized that there was no saint with that name.

The community borders the shores of Whitewater Lake, except for its most western portion.

Municipal Road 35, linking Azilda to downtown Sudbury, has been increased from two lanes to four lanes, which has improved the commute for Azilda's workers, who are mostly employed in the city's urban core. In addition, it shortens the travel time for tourists hoping to visit Sudbury Downs, which is located in the outskirts of Azilda. There are plans to complete the widening of Municipal Road 35 between Azilda and Chelmsford, on which construction began in 2019 and is scheduled to be completed in 2020.

On September 12, 1906, Azilda was the site of a train wreck.

While the population is still growing, there are no industries other than basic agriculture (corn, potatoes, beans) and horticulture. Much of the workforce travels to Sudbury to work, often in the primary industries such as mining.

Azilda's telephone and postal service also includes the smaller local neighbourhood of Bélangerville.

Azilda has its own flag that was revealed in 2021.

=== Chelmsford ===
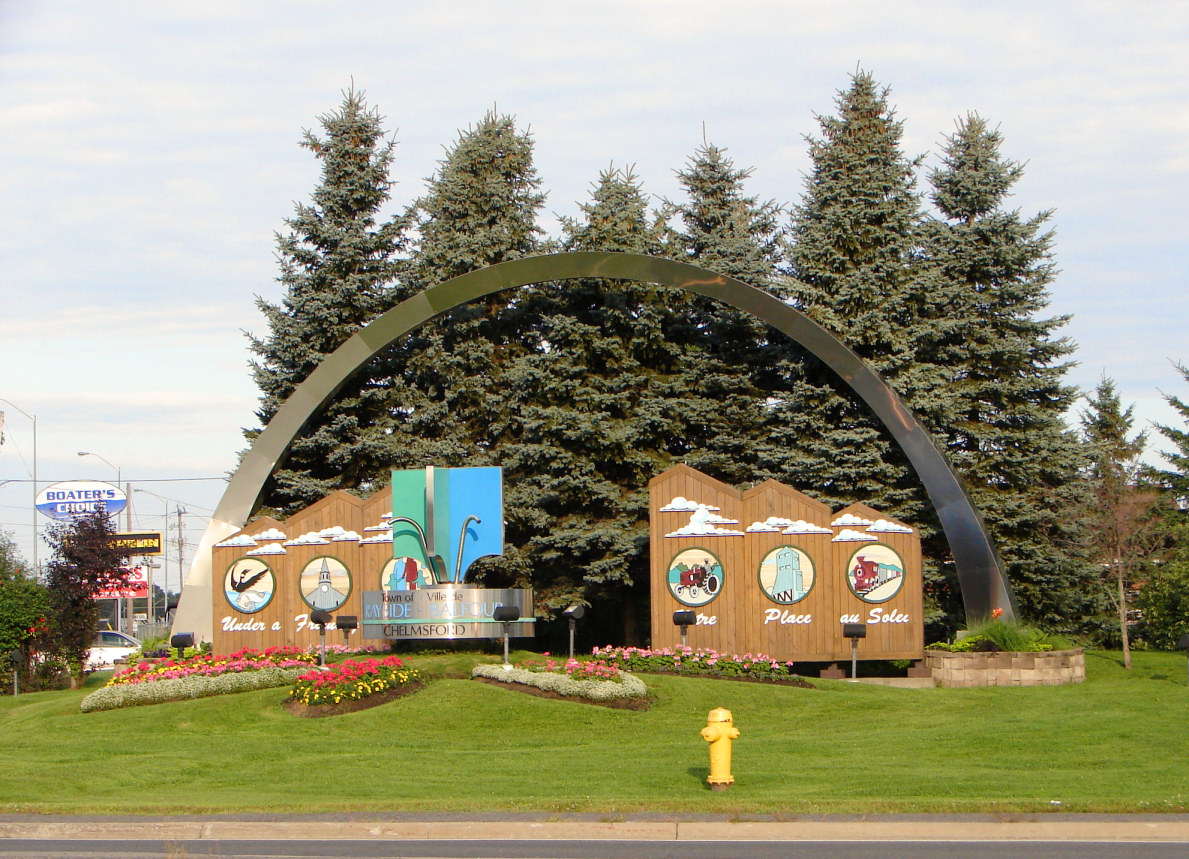
Chelmsford

Founded in 1868, Chelmsford started out as an outpost on the Canadian Pacific Railway. Some say it was named by a Canadian Pacific Railway engineer from the United Kingdom, after the city of Chelmsford in Essex. As with many communities in Northern Ontario, logging and fur trapping were the first industries. Having depleted the lumber in the early 1900s, Chelmsford turned to mining and agriculture to support the town's economy. Errington Mine and Nickel Offset mine were two of the largest mines in Chelmsford and both closed in the 1930s.

In 1909, Chelmsford was separately incorporated as a town. It retained this status until 1968, when it was reamalgamated with the township of Balfour.

Today, Chelmsford has no major industries and is mostly a residential community. Although there are still some farms producing mostly potatoes, small fruits and corn, it is mostly supported by the mining activities in the nearby communities of Onaping Falls and Copper Cliff.

Postal delivery and telephone service in Chelmsford also includes the smaller neighbourhoods of Boninville and Larchwood.

Chelmsford is host to an annual fiddle festival, Fiddle Works, in May.

=== Boninville ===
Boninville is located on the border with Valley-East in the Rayside Township. The name was created from two prominent farming families in the area: Bonin and Rainville. The main intersection is at Montée Rouleau and Rue St-Laurent. The area is known for potato farming. The families are French-Canadian and worship at the Roman Catholic Church Notre-Dame-du-Très-Saint-Rosaire in Blezard Valley.

== Languages ==
Chelmsford has a stronger francophone population with 53% speaking French at home and the 47% remaining speaking English at home, and Azilda on the other hand has a slight anglophone population with 52% speaking and 48% French speaking.

== Economy ==
- R.M. Bélanger Ltd. (1961), construction company

== Politics ==
Rayside-Balfour had two mayors prior to the amalgamation of Greater Sudbury: Gilles Pelland (1972–1988) and Lionel Lalonde (1988–2000). As part of the city, it is divided between Ward 3 (Chelmsford and the former town of Onaping Falls) and Ward 4 (Azilda and the northwestern portion of the former city of Sudbury) on Greater Sudbury City Council, currently represented by city councillors Michel Guy Brabant and Pauline Fortin respectively.

The Rayside-Balfour area is in the federal riding of Sudbury East—Manitoulin—Nickel Belt, represented in the Canadian House of Commons by Jim Belanger of the Conservative Party of Canada, and in the provincial riding of Nickel Belt, represented by France Gélinas of the Ontario New Democratic Party. As tradition goes, the area itself generally votes NDP both provincially and federally.

== Transportation ==
Chelmsford and Azilda are served by Greater Sudbury Transit's 702 Azilda/Chelmsford bus, which departs approximately every 2 hours. Both communities are also connection points for Greater Sudbury Transit's transcab service, which connects passengers along Municipal Road 15 to Blezard Valley at Azilda, and Dowling, Onaping, and Levack at Chelmsford respectively.

For intercity transit, both communities are flag stops for Via Rail's Sudbury–White River route, as well as Ontario Northland's coach service.

== Education ==
Azilda Students: those in the English Catholic stream attend St Charles School in the neighbouring community of Chelmsford and Bishop Carter Alexander Catholic Secondary School in Hanmer for boys and Marymount Academy for girls in nearby Uptown Sudbury. Those in the English public stream attend Chelmsford Public School and Chelmsford Valley District Composite School. Both of these schools are in the neighbouring community of Chelmsford. Those in the French Catholic stream attend École Ste-Marie in Azilda and École secondaire catholique Champlain in the neighbouring community of Chelmsford or Collège Notre-Dame in Sudbury. Those in the French public stream attend Franco-Nord and École secondaire Macdonald-Cartier. Chelmsford Students: those in the English catholic stream attend St Charles School and Bishop Alexander Carter Catholic Secondary School for boys and Marymount Academy for girls. Both of those schools in the neighbouring communities of Hanmer and Uptown Sudbury. Those in the English public stream attend Chelmsford Public School and Chelmsford Valley District Composite School. Those in the French Catholic stream attend École Alliance-St-Joseph and École secondaire catholique Champlain or Collège Notre-Dame. Those in the French public stream attend École Pavilion de L'Avenir and École secondaire Macdonald-Cartier

== Notable people ==
- Robert Campeau, financier
- Randy Carlyle, NHL hockey player
- Chuck Labelle, musician
- Stéphane Paquette, musician and actor
