= Shelley Martel =

Canadian politician

The Honourable Shelley Martel ECO

Ontario MPP
- In office 1999–2007
- Preceded by: Blain Morin
- Succeeded by: France Gélinas
- Constituency: Nickel Belt
- In office 1987–1999
- Preceded by: Elie Martel
- Succeeded by: Riding abolished
- Constituency: Sudbury East

Personal details
- Born: Shelley Dawn Marie Martel; April 8, 1963 (age 63) Sudbury, Ontario
- Party: Ontario New Democratic
- Spouse: Howard Hampton
- Relations: Elie Martel, father Norman Fawcett, grandfather
- Children: 2
- Occupation: Insurance adjudicator

Shelley Dawn Marie Martel (born April 8, 1963) is a former politician in Ontario, Canada. She was a New Democratic member of the Legislative Assembly of Ontario from 1987 to 2007. She represented the ridings of Sudbury East and Nickel Belt. She was a cabinet minister in the government of Bob Rae.

== Background ==
Martel was born in Sudbury, Ontario, the second of four children. Her father is Elie Martel, who was a long time NDP member of the Ontario legislature. Her mother is the daughter of another area politician, Norman Fawcett, who served as mayor of Capreol, and as Nickel Belt's federal MP from 1965 to 1968. She studied International Politics at the University of Toronto and French at the Sorbonne. She then worked as a claims adjudicator with the Ontario Workers' Compensation Board.

Martel and former Ontario NDP leader Howard Hampton were married in 1994, and have two children, Sarah and Jonathan. Both were members of cabinet in the Bob Rae government at that time. Her daughter, Sarah served as a legislative page in 2007. Martel herself was a page when her father was serving in the Legislature.

In 2003, both Martel and Hampton supported Bill Blaikie's campaign to become leader of the federal New Democratic Party.

She lives in Toronto, Ontario.

== Politics ==
In 1987 at age 24, Martel was elected as the New Democratic Party candidate in the riding of Sudbury East defeating Liberal opponent Claude Mayer by 6,005 votes. She was named as the party's critic for culture and francophone affairs. She was re-elected in the 1990 provincial election, in which the NDP won a majority government.

=== In cabinet ===
On October 1, 1990, Martel was named Minister of Northern Development and Government House Leader in the cabinet of Bob Rae. On July 31, 1991 Rae performed a minor cabinet shuffle. Martel's portfolio was enhanced when she took over Mines from Gilles Pouliot to become the Minister of Northern Development and Mines but she lost her position as Government House Leader to Dave Cooke.

In June 1991, she became involved in a minor controversy when she and fellow cabinet minister Anne Swarbrick wrote letters to the Ontario College of Physicians and Surgeons asking for the suspension of the licence of a physician who had been convicted of sexually assaulting four teenage female patients. Since the letters violated conflict of interest guidelines she and Swarbrick offered their resignations from cabinet. However Premier Rae refused to accept their resignations. He said, "Not every mistake in these circumstances should lead to a resignation." Liberal leader Robert Nixon, who expressed his view to the Ontario Legislature that, while it may not have been an appropriate action for members of Cabinet, it was not one that should lead to their discharge. He said, "Their reputations and integrity have in no way suffered by these statements."

In July 1991, Martel led an effort to save a paper mill in Kapuskasing from closure. The deal was initially rejected by cabinet but was resurrected in August when Rae agreed to purchase the Smoky Falls hydroelectric dam from Kimberly-Clark and give the mill 10 years of free power.

In December 1991, she was involved in another controversy when she fabricated some remarks about a Sudbury doctor who had criticized the government about billing caps. One of the participants at the meeting was Evelyn Dodds, a Thunder Bay municipal councillor and former Progressive Conservative candidate. Dodds wrote a letter about the conversation to PC leader Mike Harris who read it in the legislature. Martel said of the incident, "I made some remarks which were completely unfounded and which are without basis", and that they were made during a "heated private conversation". The opposition called for Martel's resignation but this was rejected by Rae. "The minister has apologized for what happened in a private conversation and admitted she made a mistake ... and as far as I'm concerned that's (the end of it)."

In March 1992, an all-party committee investigated the incident. Martel took the unusual step of taking a lie detector test to show that she was telling the truth about making up a story about seeing confidential files on the doctor. The committee concluded that Martel did not need to resign. However, the Liberal and Conservative members of the committee who were in the minority called for Martel's resignation.

While Martel was exonerated by the committee's report, the controversy continued to dog her through the next couple of years and her influence in cabinet was limited. She finally resigned from her portfolio on October 7, 1994. Martel's resignation occurred after the Ontario Privacy Commissioner found that she had passed on personal financial information about an Ottawa man who owned land for the purposes of mining speculation.

=== Cabinet positions ===
Rae ministry, Province of Ontario (1990–1995)
Cabinet post (1)
Predecessor	Office	Successor
René Fontaine	Minister of Northern Development and Mines (Note: Between October 1, 1990 and July 31, 1991 Martel's cabinet office was Minister of Northern Development. The Minister of Mines was Gilles Pouliot.); 1990–1994	Gilles Pouliot
Special Parliamentary Responsibilities
Predecessor	Title	Successor
Chris Ward	Government House Leader; 1990–1991	Dave Cooke

=== In opposition ===
Despite her colourful career in cabinet and the general decline of the NDP, Martel was re-elected in Sudbury East in the 1995 provincial election, defeating Liberal opponent Paul Menard. She was one of only seventeen NDP MPPs to be re-elected in this campaign. She was named as the party's critic for natural resources.

In 1996, Martel and fellow MPP Peter Kormos surreptitiously entered a government building for a new department for family support. They wanted to show that the new centralized office was in disarray. They videotaped an office full of empty desks, boxes and unplugged computers. While the two were not charged with trespassing, Kormos was acquitted of a charge of assaulting a security guard during their visit.

When the riding of Sudbury East was eliminated for the 1999 election, she was re-elected again in the redistributed Nickel Belt riding. Nickel Belt's previous MPP Blain Morin, who had won the riding just eight months earlier in a by-election following the retirement of Floyd Laughren, decided not to challenge Martel for the party's nomination. She defeated her Liberal opponent by 4,344 votes.

In 2000, Martel co-sponsored a private member's bill with fellow NDP member Marilyn Churley that called for a ban on development on the environmentally sensitive Oak Ridges Moraine. While the bill did not pass it helped to heighten awareness of the issue and led to a six-month development moratorium in 2001. Elements of the private member's bill were incorporated into the Oak Ridges Moraine Conservation Act, 2002.

In 2002, Martel sponsored another private member's bill on the rights of medical patients. The bill which she named the 'Tommy Douglas Act' would have set standards for patient care and ensured accessibility for long term care.

In the 2003 election, she defeated Liberal Alex McCauley by fewer than 3,000 votes to win her fifth and final term in the legislature.

=== Retirement ===
On May 18, 2007, Martel announced that she would not seek re-election and would quit politics after the 2007 election, to spend more time with her family and pursue other career opportunities.

During the election campaign, Progressive Conservative leader John Tory stated that if elected, he would name Martel to conduct a review of current government medical and social services for children with autism, an issue which Martel had frequently championed in the legislature. In response to the statement, Hampton said "I wish Mr. Tory good luck, but my wife is rather fussy about who she hangs around with. Believe me, I know. It took me about six years."

Martel committed, however, to campaign on behalf of France Gélinas, her successor as the New Democratic Party candidate in Nickel Belt. On election day, Gélinas successfully held the riding, defeating Liberal candidate Ron Dupuis.

Martel endorsed Alberta MP Heather McPherson in the 2026 New Democratic Party leadership election.
