= Sudbury East—Manitoulin—Nickel Belt =

Federal electoral district in Ontario, Canada

Ontario electoral district
- Interactive map of riding boundaries from the 2025 federal election

Federal electoral district
- Legislature: House of Commons
MP
Jim Belanger
Conservative
- District created: 2023
- First contested: 2025

Demographics
- Population (2021): 99,827
- Electors: 85,955
- Census division(s): Greater Sudbury, Manitoulin District, Nipissing District, Sudbury District
- Census subdivision(s): Greater Sudbury (part), West Nipissing, Espanola, Sables-Spanish Rivers, French River, Wikwemikong Unceded, Markstay-Warren, Northeastern Manitoulin and the Islands, Central Manitoulin, St.-Charles

Sudbury East—Manitoulin—Nickel Belt (French: Sudbury-Est–Manitoulin–Nickel Belt) is a federal electoral district in Ontario, Canada. It came into effect upon the call of the 2025 Canadian federal election.

== Geography ==
Under the 2022 Canadian federal electoral redistribution the riding was created out of parts of Algoma—Manitoulin—Kapuskasing, Nickel Belt, and Sudbury. The riding is in northeastern Ontario.

- Gains all of Sudbury west of Highway 144
- Gains Manitoulin District and that part of Sudbury District near Lake Huron from Algoma—Manitoulin—Kapuskasing
- Loses Nickel Centre, Wanup and the remainder of the former city of Sudbury to Sudbury

== Demographics ==
According to the 2021 Canadian census

Languages: 65.8% English, 34.2% French

Religions: 67.4% Christian (49.9% Catholic, 4.5% United Church, 3.0% Anglican, 10.0% Other), 30.6% No religion, 1.2% Traditional Indigenous spirituality

Median income: $42,400 (2020)

Average income: $51,300 (2020)

Panethnic groups in Sudbury East—Manitoulin—Nickel Belt (2021)
Panethnic group	2021	
Panethnic group	Pop.	%
European (Note: Statistic includes all persons that did not make up part of a visible minority or an indigenous identity.)	79,090	79.97%
Indigenous	18,245	18.45%
African	515	0.52%
South Asian	280	0.28%
Southeast Asian (Note: Statistic includes total responses of "Filipino" and "Southeast Asian" under visible minority section on census.)	265	0.27%
East Asian (Note: Statistic includes total responses of "Chinese", "Korean", and "Japanese" under visible minority section on census.)	215	0.22%
Latin American	80	0.08%
Middle Eastern (Note: Statistic includes total responses of "West Asian" and "Arab" under visible minority section on census.)	20	0.02%
Other/multiracial (Note: Statistic includes total responses of "Visible minority, n.i.e." and "Multiple visible minorities" under visible minority section on census.)	185	0.19%
Total responses	98,900	99.06%
Total population	99,835	100%
Notes: Totals greater than 100% due to multiple origin responses. Demographics based on 2022 Canadian federal electoral redistribution riding boundaries.

== History ==
Jim Belanger defeated Nickel Belt MP Marc Serré, and the Conservatives picked up the seat for the first time in over 70 years.

Parliament	Years	Member	Party
Sudbury East—Manitoulin—Nickel Belt; Riding created from Algoma—Manitoulin—Kapuskasing, Nickel Belt, and Sudbury
45th	2025–present	Jim Belanger	Conservative

== Riding associations ==
Riding associations are the local branches of political parties:

Party	Association name	President	HQ city
Conservative	Sudbury East--Manitoulin--Nickel Belt Conservative Association	Jessica M. Whalen	Markstay-Warren
Liberal	Sudbury East-Manitoulin-Nickel Belt Federal Liberal Association	André J. Bisson	Greater Sudbury
New Democratic	Sudbury East--Manitoulin--Nickel Belt Federal NDP Riding Association		Greater Sudbury

== Election results ==
2025 Canadian federal election
** Preliminary results — Not yet official **
Party	Candidate	Votes	%	±%	Expenditures
Conservative	Jim Belanger	29,129	48.33	+21.42	
Liberal	Marc G. Serré	24,122	40.03	+8.05	
New Democratic	Andréane Chénier	4,818	7.99	–22.35	
People's	Sharilynne St. Louis	1,423	2.36	–6.54	
Green	Himal Hossain	453	0.75	-0.98	
Libertarian	Justin Dean Newell Leroux	321	0.53	N/A	
Total valid votes/expense limit					
Total rejected ballots					
Turnout		60,266	70.11		
Eligible voters		85,955			
Conservative notional gain from Liberal		Swing		+6.69	
Source: Elections Canada

2021 federal election redistributed results
Party	Vote	%
Liberal	16,416	31.98
New Democratic	15,570	30.34
Conservative	13,809	26.91
People's	4,570	8.90
Green	887	1.73
Others	73	0.14

== See also ==
- List of Canadian electoral districts
