= Edelgard Mahant =

Canadian politician

Edelgard Elspeth Mahant is a retired Canadian academic, who taught political science at York University's Glendon College in Toronto, Ontario, at Laurentian University in Sudbury, Ontario, and University of Botswana.

She was the Ontario Liberal Party candidate in the electoral district of Sudbury East in the 1985 provincial election.

== Education ==
She completed her studies at the Universities of British Columbia (BA) and Toronto (MA) and obtained her PhD at the London School of Economics and Political Science with a thesis titled "French and German Attitudes to the Establishment of the European Economic Community, 1955-1957".

== Areas of expertise ==
Mahant specialized in foreign policy, including the politics of the European Union, Free trade and International Relations.

She has cowritten two books on Canada-United States relations with historian Graeme S. Mount:

- An introduction to Canadian-American relations Graeme S. Mount, Edelgard E. Mahant. Methuen, London 1984 ISBN 0-458-97190-1
- Invisible and inaudible in Washington: American policies toward Canada Graeme S. Mount, Edelgard E. Mahant. UBC Press, Vancouver 1999 ISBN 0-7748-0703-2

Other books Mahant is also the author of several other books and publications:

- Grandma's Gone to Africa. One Woman's Journey to Botswana the Good Toronto: EP2M Enterprises, 2016.ISBN 978-1522700128.
- Darfur to Taipei. Cases in Foreign Policy Analysis Edelgard Mahant and Bodistean, eds Toronto: Glendon College, 2015 ISBN 9781508823742
- Free trade in American-Canadian relations Edelgard E. Mahant. Krieger 1993 ISBN 0-89464-522-6
- Birthmarks of Europe: the origins of the European Community reconsidered Edelgard E. Mahant. Ashgate 2004 ISBN 0-7546-1487-5
