= Sean Costello (author) =

Canadian writer

Sean Costello (born 1951 in Ottawa, Ontario) is a Canadian author of horror fiction and an anesthesiologist living in Sudbury, Ontario.

His first three novels, published in North America by Pocket Books, have been released in the United Kingdom by Tor Books and translated into Dutch, German and Russian. Finders Keepers and Sandman were published by Red Tower Publications, and Here After has been optioned to film. Squall, from Your Scrivener Press, was released in trade paperback in October 2014.

Costello published Terminal House in 2017. In 2018 he followed with his ninth novel, Euthanasia.

In 2020, Costello, Mark Leslie and Scott Overton published Strange Sudbury Stories, an anthology of horror stories set in the city.

== Works ==
- Eden's Eyes (1989)
- The Cartoonist (1990)
- Captain Quad (1991)
- Finders Keepers (2002)
- Sandman (2003)
- Here After (2008)
- Squall (2014)
- Last Call (2015)
- Terminal House (2017)
- Euthanasia (2018)
