= Mark Leslie (author) =

Canadian writer

Mark Leslie (né Mark Leslie Lefebvre; born 1969) is a Canadian author of horror and speculative fiction. In 2021, Leslie won the 2021 Kobo Writing Life Indie Cover Contest for Fear and Longing in Los Angeles. He is the author of the short story collection One Hand Screaming (2004), a collection of short stories and poetry, mostly in the horror genre, the horror novel I, Death, (2014) the thriller Evasion (2014) and the editor of the science fiction anthology North of Infinity II (2006) and horror anthology Campus Chills (2009). Leslie is also the author of Haunted Hamilton: The Ghosts of Dundurn Castle & Other Steeltown Shivers (2012), Spooky Sudbury: True Tales of the Eerie & Unexplained (2013)(co-authored with Jenny Jelen) and Tomes of Terror: Haunted Bookstores and Libraries (2014)

== Biography ==
Mark Leslie Lefebvre was born and raised in Onaping Falls.

He jokes that he decided to write under the name Mark Leslie because it would be easier for people to spell and pronounce. Because he has been known in the book industry as Mark Lefebvre (former President of the Canadian Booksellers Association and Director of Self-Publishing and Author Relations for Rakuten Kobo, Inc) he released both his podcast and a series of books about writing, bookselling, and publishing, under his full name.

In 2020, Leslie, Sean Costello and Scott Overton published Strange Sudbury Stories, an anthology of horror stories set in Sudbury.

Fear and Longing in Los Angeles was designed by Juan Padron. In a 2021 interview, Leslie shared that the novel includes a special cameo appearance by Alicia Witt, whose music, empathy, and kindness to the novel's main character, Michael Andrews, helps him reach a pivotal moment in his life. Because Witt is an indie musician and owns access to most of her recorded work, she allowed Leslie use of the song lyrics in the book, as well as audio clips from her songs Already Gone, and Friend in the audiobook version of the novel.

== Personal life ==
Leslie lived in Hamilton, Ontario for twenty years, then moved to Waterloo, Ontario in January 2018.

== Books ==
=== Fiction ===
- One Hand Screaming (2004, Stark Publishing, ISBN 978-0-9735688-0-6)
- North of Infinity II (Editor) (2006, Mosaic Press, ISBN 978-0-88962-864-9)
- Campus Chills (Editor) (2009, Stark Publishing, ISBN 978-0-9735688-1-3)
- Tesseracts Sixteen: Parnassus Unbound (Editor) (2012, Edge Science Fiction & Fantasy Publishing, ISBN 978-1-894063-92-0)
- I, Death (2014, Atomic Fez, ISBN 978-1-927609-03-3), (2016, Edge Science Fiction & Fantasy Publishing, ISBN 978-1-77053122-2)
- Evasion (2015, Stark Publishing, ISBN 978-0-9735688-5-1)
- Fiction River: Editor's Choice (Editor) (2017, WMG Publishing, ISBN 978-1-56146-786-0)
- Fiction River: Feel the Fear (Editor) (2017, WMG Publishing, ISBN 978-1-56146-788-4)
- Active Reader: And Other Cautionary Tales from the Book World (2018, Stark Publishing, ISBN 978-1-386-54402-9)
- Bumps in the Night: Creepy Campfire Tales (2018, Stark Publishing, ISBN 978-1-540-10235-5)
- Fiction River: Feel the Love (Editor) (2019, WMG Publishing, ISBN 978-1-56146-074-8)
- Fiction River: Superstitious (Editor) (2019, WMG Publishing, ISBN 978-1561461295)
- Snowman Shivers: Two Short Humor Tales About Snowmen (2019, Stark Publishing, ISBN 978-1-989-35104-8)

Fiction Series: Canadian Werewolf

- Book 0.5 - This Time Around: A Canadian Werewolf Short Story (2020, Stark Publishing, ISBN 978-1-989351-18-5, ISBN 978-1-989351-21-5)
- Book 1 - A Canadian Werewolf in New York (2017 & 2020, Stark Publishing, ISBN 978-0-9735688-7-5, ISBN 978-1-989351-16-1)
- Book 2 - Stowe Away (2020, Stark Publishing, ISBN 978-1-989351-12-3, ISBN 978-1-989351-13-0)
- Book 3 - Fear and Longing in Los Angeles (2021, Stark Publishing, ISBN 978-1-989351-23-9, ISBN 978-1-989351-22-2)
- Book 4 - Fright Nights, Big City (2021, Stark Publishing, ISBN 978-1-989351-50-5, ISBN 978-1-989351-51-2)
- Book 5 - Lover's Moon [co-authored with Julie Strauss] (2022, Stark Publishing, ISBN 978-1-989351-69-7, ISBN 978-1-989351-70-3)
- Book 6 - Hex and the City (2023, Stark Publishing, ISBN 978-1-989351-77-2, ISBN 978-1-989351-78-9)

=== Non-fiction ===
- Haunted Hamilton: The Ghosts of Dundurn Castle & Other Steeltown Shivers (2012, Dundurn, ISBN 978-14597-0401-5)
- Spooky Sudbury: True Tales of the Eerie & Unexplained (co-author Jenny Jelen) (2013, Dundurn, ISBN 978-1-4597-1923-1)
- Tomes of Terror: Haunted Bookstores & Libraries (2014, Dundurn, ISBN 978-1-4597-2860-8)
- Creepy Capital: Ghost Stories of Ottawa and the National Capital Region (2016, Dundurn, ISBN 978-1-4597-3345-9)
- Haunted Hospitals: Eerie Tales About Hospitals, Sanatoriums, and Other Institutions (co-author Rhonda Parrish) (2017, Dundurn, ISBN 978-1-4597-3786-0)
- Macabre Montreal: Ghostly Tales, Ghastly Events, and Gruesome True Stories (co-author Shayna Krishnasamy) (2018, Dundurn, ISBN 978-1-4597-4258-1)

=== Non-Fiction under Mark Leslie Lefebvre ===
- The 7 P's of Publishing Success (2018, Stark Publishing, ISBN 978-1-775-14781-7)
- Killing It on Kobo (2018, Stark Publishing, ISBN 978-1-775-14784-8)
- An Author's Guide to Working with Libraries and Bookstores (2019, Stark Publishing, ISBN 978-1-989351-06-2)
- Wide for the Win (2021, Stark Publishing, ISBN 978-1-989351-26-0)
- The Relaxed Author [co-authored with Joanna Penn] (2021, Curl Up Press, ISBN 978-1-913321-71-0, ISBN 978-1-913321-72-7)
- Publishing Pitfalls for Authors (2021, Stark Publishing, ISBN 978-1-989351-54-3)
- Accounting for Authors [co-authored with D.F. Hart, MBA] (2022, Stark Publishing, ISBN 978-1-989351-67-3)

=== Awards ===
- Fear and Longing in Los Angeles won the 2021 KWL (Kobo Writing Life) Best Indie Book Cover 2021 Award. The cover was created by designer Juan Padron.
- Short story "Erratic Cycles" (Parsec Magazine Winter 1998-1999) was nominated in category of Best short-form work in English 2000
- Haunted Hamilton was short-listed in Non-Fiction for the Hamilton Arts Council Literary Awards 2013
