= Judy Erola =

Canadian politician (born 1934)

The Honourable Judy Erola PC

Member of the Canadian Parliament for Nickel Belt
- In office 1980–1984
- Preceded by: John Rodriguez
- Succeeded by: John Rodriguez

Minister of State for Mines
- In office 3 March 1980 – 12 August 1983
- Preceded by: new position
- Succeeded by: Roger Simmons

Minister responsible for the Status of Women
- In office 22 September 1981 – 16 September 1984
- Preceded by: Lloyd Axworthy
- Succeeded by: Barbara McDougall

Minister of Consumer and Corporate Affairs
- In office 12 August 1983 – 16 September 1984
- Preceded by: André Ouellet
- Succeeded by: Michel Côté

Personal details
- Born: Judith Jacobson; 16 January 1934 (age 92) Sudbury, Ontario
- Party: Liberal
- Occupation: broadcaster, sales executive

Judith Erola, née Jacobson, PC (born 16 January 1934) is a former Canadian politician who represented the riding of Nickel Belt in the House of Commons of Canada from 1980 to 1984. She was a member of the Liberal Party.

== Broadcasting career ==
Born in Sudbury, Ontario, Erola worked as a radio and television broadcaster in Sudbury. At CKSO-TV, she made history as the first woman employed by a Canadian television station as a weather reporter, and also presented segments on fashion. She later became an account executive for CHNO, and married Voito (Vic) Erola, the owner of a marina on Lake Panache, in 1955.

== Politics ==
Following the death of her husband Vic in 1977, Erola decided to pursue a career in politics. She ran in the 1979 election as the Liberal candidate in Nickel Belt, losing to incumbent New Democrat John Rodriguez. Her campaign in that year was marked in part by a stumble when her election brochure called for "nationalization of farmland usage policies"; challenged in a radio interview to clarify her position given that the Liberal Party was generally opposed to nationalization, she clarified that the word was a typographical error whose intended meaning was rationalization.

Erola defeated Rodriguez in the 1980 election. She faced some controversy during and after the election campaign, both for characterizing Rodriguez as a Marxist in her election literature and for a telephone message targeted to housewives, which appeared to suggest that electing a woman to the House of Commons was more important than having representation for labour issues, a position which starkly divided the city in the still-lingering aftermath of the devastating 1978 Inco strike.

She served in the Cabinet of Canada for the entirety of her term as a federal Member of Parliament, despite an early perception that her caucus colleague Doug Frith was more likely to be chosen as the Sudbury area's representative in cabinet. Over the course of her career, she served as Minister of State for Mines, Minister responsible for the Status of Women, Minister of Consumer and Corporate Affairs and Minister of State for Social Development.

Shortly after being named to cabinet, Erola resigned her position as director and treasurer of the marina company, in compliance with federal conflict of interest regulations for cabinet ministers.

=== Ministry of Mines ===
As Minister of Mines, her first significant piece of legislation was a change to the Canada Labour Code, placing federally-regulated mines in Ontario under the stricter provincial health and safety laws by adopting the Ontario Occupational Health and Safety Act as federal law. The issue had long been championed in particular by uranium miners in Elliot Lake after a number of incidents in which workers had requested exemption under the provincial law from unsafe duties for which the federal law did not offer protection, but the workers criticized the process Erola used as an ineffective one that was likely to be challenged in the courts by mining companies. The change also permitted women, who had previously been barred from working underground in mines by federal regulation even though the provincial law permitted them, to work underground for the first time.

In June 1980, Erola faced criticism for using a government flight to transport colleagues from Ottawa to Sudbury to attend a testimonial dinner for former Liberal MP James Jerome.

During the 1981 provincial election, allegations surfaced that the Liberals and the Progressive Conservatives had entered into a tacit agreement in 1980, under which the PCs ran an intentionally weak campaign in Nickel Belt to help Erola defeat Rodriguez, purportedly in exchange for the Liberals similarly throwing the Sudbury riding in 1981 to help Jim Gordon defeat incumbent NDP MPP Bud Germa; the allegations surfaced after the Liberals mounted a stronger campaign for the provincial seat than the PCs were expecting, and Liberal organizers denied that there was any mutual agreement.

Erola strongly supported the development of a mining equipment manufacturing industry in Canada as a bulwark against machinery shortages, and made special efforts to reassure mining companies that they would not be the target of a policy similar to the controversial National Energy Program. In June 1981, she announced a policy under which the federal government would give a $400 grant as an incentive to owners of propane-fuelled vehicles.

In 1982, she worked with Frith and Nickel Belt MPP Floyd Laughren to prevent significant layoffs by Inco Limited in the Sudbury area. She also instituted a task force within the ministry to examine potential solutions to the economic difficulties faced by mining communities when the local mining industry reduced staff or closed down.

=== Status of Women ===
In September 1981, Erola was given the position of Minister responsible for the Status of Women alongside her existing duties as Minister of Mines. She was the first woman to be named to that position, which had previously been held by Lloyd Axworthy.

In this role, she fought to protect Section Twenty-eight of the Canadian Charter of Rights and Freedoms, a section of the then-proposed Constitution Act, 1982 which guaranteed the gender equality rights of men and women, against attempts by some provinces to quash the provision. She also supported efforts to improve maternity leave pay for women, attempts to toughen federal laws against domestic violence, reforms to the Indian Act which would improve the rights of indigenous women marrying non-indigenous men, reforms to the organizational structure of the National Action Committee on the Status of Women, and stricter policies against the use of gender stereotypes in government communications.

In October 1982, Erola also became the first woman ever appointed to the cabinet's priorities and planning committee, which debates and decides on the direction of government policy.

=== Consumer and Corporate Affairs ===
In August 1983, Erola was shuffled out of the Ministry of Mines and was named Minister of Consumer and Corporate Affairs. She immediately pledged to place a greater emphasis on consumer issues than her predecessor André Ouellet, who had sometimes been criticized for giving those issues short shrift.

In this role, some of her most public political battles involved the resistance of some organizations to the continued implementation of the metric system. She also proposed, but later abandoned, legislation to limit corporate mergers in newspaper publishing.

After Pierre Trudeau's retirement as Prime Minister, Erola continued to serve as Minister of Consumer and Corporate Affairs in the cabinet of John Turner. However, in the 1984 election, which saw the governing Liberals reduced to just 40 seats, Erola was defeated by Rodriguez.

== Post-political career ==
In 1987, Erola became president of the Pharmaceutical Manufacturers' Association of Canada, a position she held until her retirement in 1998. She was succeeded in that role by Murray Elston, a former Member of Provincial Parliament in Ontario.

She was an ex officio delegate to the 2006 Liberal Party of Canada leadership election.

She has served on the board of Equal Voice, an organization which seeks to assist Canadian women in running for political office.

== Electoral record ==
1979 Canadian federal election: Nickel Belt
Party	Candidate	Votes	%	±%
New Democratic	John Rodriguez	17,772	43.37	−6.41
Liberal	Judy Erola	15,799	38.55	+0.65
Progressive Conservative	Harwood Nesbitt	7,308	17.83	+5.51
Marxist–Leninist	David Starbuck	103	0.25	
Total valid votes		40,982	100.00	
Total rejected ballots		115		
Turnout		41,097	77.08	−0.28
Electors on the lists		53,320		
Note: Percentage change numbers are not factored for redistribution.

1980 Canadian federal election: Nickel Belt
Party	Candidate	Votes	%	±%
Liberal	Judy Erola	19,805	47.52	+8.97
New Democratic	John Rodriguez	17,529	42.06	−1.31
Progressive Conservative	Dennis Tappenden	4,250	10.20	−7.63
Marxist–Leninist	David Starbuck	89	0.21	−0.04
Total valid votes		41,673	100.00	
Total rejected ballots		119		
Turnout		41,792	75.18	−1.90
Electors on the lists		55,587		

1984 Canadian federal election: Nickel Belt
Party	Candidate	Votes	%	±%
New Democratic	John Rodriguez	17,141	38.60	−3.46
Progressive Conservative	Gord Slade	13,857	31.20	+21.00
Liberal	Judy Erola	13,124	29.55	−17.97
Rhinoceros	Derek Aardvark Orford	288	0.65	–
Total valid votes		44,410	100.00	
Total rejected ballots		250	0.01	
Turnout		44,660	79.55	
Electors on the lists		56,139		
