= Nickel Belt (federal electoral district) =

Federal electoral district in Ontario, Canada

Coordinates: 46.96°N 81.51°W

Ontario electoral district
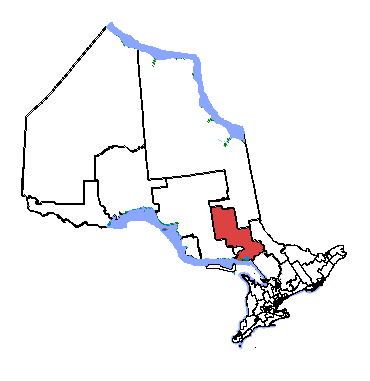
- Nickel Belt in relation to other Ontario electoral districts

Federal electoral district
- Legislature: House of Commons
- District created: 1952
- District abolished: 2023
- First contested: 1953
- Last contested: 2021
- District webpage: profile, map

Demographics
- Population (2021): 94,947
- Electors (2021): 78,267
- Area (km²): 26,564.18
- Census division(s): Greater Sudbury, Sudbury District plus small portions of Timiskaming, Manitoulin, Nipissing and Parry Sound
- Census subdivision(s): Biscotasing, Cartier, French River, Gogama, Greater Sudbury, Killarney, Markstay-Warren, St. Charles, West Nipissing, Whitefish Lake

Nickel Belt was a former federal electoral district that served the city of Greater Sudbury, Ontario, Canada. It was represented in the House of Commons of Canada from 1953 to 2025.

== Geography ==
It consists of:

- the part of the Territorial District of Timiskaming lying west of the townships of Fallon and Cleaver;
- the Territorial District of Sudbury, excluding:
  - the part lying west of and including the townships of Shenango, Lemoine, Carty, Pinogami, Biggs, Rollo, Swayze, Cunningham, Blamey, Shipley, Singapore, Burr and Edighoffer;
  - the part lying south and west of a line and including the townships of Acheson, Venturi and Ermatinger and Totten, west of and excluding the City of Greater Sudbury, and west of and including the Township of Roosevelt;
- the northeast part of the City of Greater Sudbury;
- the Town of Killarney (in the territorial district of Manitoulin and Parry Sound);
- the unorganized territory lying on the north shore of Georgian Bay and east of the town of Killarney in the Territorial District of Manitoulin; and
- the Municipality of West Nipissing (in the Territorial District of Nipissing).

== History ==
The riding of Nickel Belt was created in 1952 from parts of Algoma East, Algoma—Manitoulin, Nipissing, Parry Sound-Muskoka, Sudbury and Timiskaming—Cochrane ridings. It has traditionally included much of the Sudbury District and small parts of the Algoma, Nipissing and Timiskaming Districts, along with all but the urban core of Greater Sudbury.

It consisted initially of parts of the territorial districts of Sudbury and Algoma, and excluding the city of Sudbury, town of Copper Cliff, and the township of McKim. In 1966, it was redefined to consist of parts of the territorial districts of Sudbury excluding the City of Sudbury and the Town of Copper Cliff, and the northeast part of the territorial district of Manitoulin.

In 1976, it was redefined to consist of the southern part of Regional Municipality of Sudbury, the southeast part of the Territorial District of Sudbury, and the part of the Territorial District of Manitoulin including and lying east of the Townships of Killarney, and Rutherford and George Island.

In 1987, it was redefined to consist of the southern part of the Regional Municipality of Sudbury; the geographic townships of Cartier, Cascaden, Foy, Hart, Harty, Hess and Moncrieff and that part of the geographic Township of Trill not within the Town of Walden in the Territorial District of Sudbury; Wahnapitei Indian reserve No. 11; and Whitefish Lake Indian Reserve No. 6.

In 1996, it was redefined to consist of:

- the part of the Territorial District of Timiskaming lying west of the eastern limit of the geographic townships of Douglas and Geikie;
- the Territorial District of Sudbury excluding:
  - the part lying west of the eastern boundary of the townships of Shenango, Lemoine, Carty, Pinogami, Biggs, Rollo, Swayze, Cunningham, Blamey, Shipley, Singapore, Burr and Edighoffer;
  - the part lying south and west of and including the townships of Acheson, Venturi, Ermatinger, Totten and west of but excluding the Regional Municipality of Sudbury, and west of but including the Townships of Foster and Curtin.
  - the part lying east of a line and including the Townships of Stull, Valin, Cotton, Beresford and Creelman, east of and excluding the Regional Municipality of Sudbury and the Township of Hawley, east of and excluding the Townships of Hendrie and Hoskin, east of and excluding the Townships of Cosby, Mason and Martland;
- the part of Regional Municipality of Sudbury south of a line drawn from east to west along Highway 69, south along Long Lake Road, and west along the north boundary of the Township of Broder.

In 2003, it was given its current boundaries as described above.

This riding lost fractions of territory to Nipissing—Timiskaming and Algoma—Manitoulin—Kapuskasing during the 2012 electoral redistribution.

== Demographics ==
According to the 2021 Canadian census

Ethnic groups: 81.0% White, 16.8% Indigenous

Languages: 58.3% English, 34.6% French

Religions: 69.4% Christian (55.0% Catholic, 3.0% United Church, 2.6% Anglican, 8.8% Other), 29.3% None

Median income: $45,600 (2020)

Average income: $55,100 (2020)

== Members of Parliament ==
This riding has elected the following members of Parliament:

Parliament	Years	Member	Party
Nickel Belt; Riding created from Algoma East, Algoma—Manitoulin, Nipissing, Parry Sound-Muskoka, Sudbury and Timiskaming—Cochrane
22nd	1953–1957	Léo Gauthier	Liberal
23rd	1957–1958	Léo Gauthier	Liberal
24th	1958–1962	Osias Godin	Liberal
25th	1962–1963	Osias Godin	Liberal
26th	1963–1965	Osias Godin	Liberal
27th	1965–1968	Norman Fawcett	New Democratic
28th	1968–1972	Gaetan Serré	Liberal
29th	1972–1974	John Rodriguez	New Democratic
30th	1974–1979	John Rodriguez	New Democratic
31st	1979–1980	John Rodriguez	New Democratic
32nd	1980–1984	Judy Erola	Liberal
33rd	1984–1988	John Rodriguez	New Democratic
34th	1988–1993	John Rodriguez	New Democratic
35th	1993–1997	Raymond Bonin	Liberal
36th	1997–2000	Raymond Bonin	Liberal
37th	2000–2004	Raymond Bonin	Liberal
38th	2004–2006	Raymond Bonin	Liberal
39th	2006–2008	Raymond Bonin	Liberal
40th	2008–2011	Claude Gravelle	New Democratic
41st	2011–2015	Claude Gravelle	New Democratic
42nd	2015–2019	Marc Serré	Liberal
43rd	2019–2021	Marc Serré	Liberal
44th	2021–2025	Marc Serré	Liberal
Riding dissolved into Sudbury and Sudbury East—Manitoulin—Nickel Belt

== Election results ==
Graph of election results in Nickel Belt (minor parties that never got 2% of the vote or didn't run consistently are omitted) View source data.

2021 Canadian federal election
Party	Candidate	Votes	%	±%	Expenditures
Liberal	Marc Serré	17,358	34.9	-4.1	$97,617.28
Conservative	Charles Humphrey	13,425	27.2	+6.0	$25,429.59
New Democratic	Andréane Simone Chénier	13,137	26.6	-5.45	$83,168.10
People's	David Hobbs	4,549	9.1	+6.9	$0.00
Green	Craig Gravelle	864	1.7	-3.7	$4,244.03
Total valid votes		49,321			
Total rejected ballots		364			
Turnout		49,685	63.84		
Eligible voters		77,823			
Source: Elections Canada

2019 Canadian federal election: Nickel Belt
Party	Candidate	Votes	%	±%	Expenditures
Liberal	Marc Serré	19,046	38.99	-3.81	$96,428.93
New Democratic	Stéphane Paquette	15,656	32.05	-5.73	$18,983.01
Conservative	Aino Laamanen	10,343	21.17	+4.43	$7,684.88
Green	Casey Lalonde	2,644	5.41	+2.93	none listed
People's	Mikko Paavola	1,159	2.37	–	none listed
Total valid votes/expense limit		48,848	99.39		
Total rejected ballots		298	0.61	+0.22	
Turnout		49,146	64.17	-2.94	
Eligible voters		76,585			
Liberal hold		Swing		+0.96	
Source: Elections Canada

2015 Canadian federal election: Nickel Belt
Party	Candidate	Votes	%	±%	Expenditures
Liberal	Marc Serré	21,021	42.80	+28.74	$39,869.30
New Democratic	Claude Gravelle	18,556	37.78	-17.20	$94,855.24
Conservative	Aino Laamanen	8,221	16.74	-11.29	$14,060.79
Green	Stuart McCall	1,217	2.48	-0.31	$3,772.22
Marxist–Leninist	Dave Starbuck	98	0.20	+0.07	–
Total valid votes/Expense limit		49,113	99.61		$233,625.58
Total rejected ballots		192	0.39	–	
Turnout		49,305	67.11	–	
Eligible voters		73,466			
Liberal gain from New Democratic		Swing		+22.97	
Source: Elections Canada

2011 federal election redistributed results
Party	Vote	%
New Democratic	24,276	54.99
Conservative	12,373	28.03
Liberal	6,210	14.07
Green	1,231	2.79
Others	59	0.13

2011 Canadian federal election: Nickel Belt
Party	Candidate	Votes	%	±%	Expenditures
New Democratic	Claude Gravelle	24,566	54.97	+8.43	–
Conservative	Lynne Reynolds	12,503	27.98	+6.28	–
Liberal	Joe Cormier	6,382	14.28	-12.02	–
Green	Christine Guillot	1,252	2.80	-2.23	–
Marxist–Leninist	Steve Rutchinski	59	0.13	-0.03	
Total valid votes/Expense limit		44,688	100.00	–	
Total rejected ballots		171	0.38	-0.09	
Turnout		44,859	62.60	–	
Eligible voters		71,659	–	–	

2008 Canadian federal election: Nickel Belt
Party	Candidate	Votes	%	±%	Expenditures
New Democratic	Claude Gravelle	19,021	46.54	+7.94	$63,497
Liberal	Louise Portelance	10,748	26.30	-16.90	$61,589
Conservative	Ian McCracken	8,869	21.70	+9.00	
Green	Fred Twilley	2,056	5.03	+2.93	$2,065
Independent	Yves Villeneuve	112	0.27	–	–
Marxist–Leninist	Steve Rutchinski	66	0.16	+0.06	
Total valid votes/Expense limit		40,872	100.00	$94,270	
Total rejected ballots		193	0.47		
Turnout		41,065			
New Democratic Party gain from Liberal		Swing	+12.42		

2006 Canadian federal election: Nickel Belt
Party	Candidate	Votes	%	±%	Expenditures
Liberal	Ray Bonin	19,775	43.20	+0.79	$64,036
New Democratic	Claude Gravelle	17,668	38.60	+4.10	$75,188
Conservative	Margaret Schwartzentruber	5,822	12.70	-6.12	$10,196
Progressive Canadian	Mathieu Péron	1,044	2.30	–	
Green	Mark McAllister	975	2.10	-0.44	
Marijuana	Michel D. Ethier	421	0.90	-0.16	
Marxist–Leninist	Steve Rutchinski	42	0.10	-0.03	$68
Total valid votes/Expense limit		45,747	100.00	$87,252	

2004 Canadian federal election
Party	Candidate	Votes	%	±%	Expenditures
Liberal	Ray Bonin	17,188	42.41	-13.16	$44,339
New Democratic	Claude Gravelle	13,980	34.50	+13.34	$32,073
Conservative	Mike Dupont	7,628	18.82	-4.45	$59,250
Green	Steve Lafleur	1,031	2.54	–	
Marijuana	Michel D. Ethier	430	1.06	–	
Independent	Don Lavallee	217	0.54	–	$2,875
Marxist–Leninist	Steve Rutchinski	51	0.13	–	$435
Total valid votes/Expense limit		40,525	100.00	$84,953	

Note: Conservative vote is compared to the total of the Canadian Alliance vote and Progressive Conservative vote in 2000 election.

2000 Canadian federal election
Party	Candidate	Votes	%	±%	Expenditures
Liberal	Ray Bonin	19,187	55.57	+6.72	$42,569
New Democratic	Sandy Bass	7,304	21.16	-12.32	$61,722
Alliance	Neil Martin	6,369	18.45	6.49	$13,072
Progressive Conservative	Reg Couldridge	1,665	4.82	0.40	$2,739
Total valid votes/Expense limit		34,525	100.00	$68,755	

Note: Canadian Alliance vote is compared to the Reform vote in 1997 election.

1997 Canadian federal election
Party	Candidate	Votes	%	±%	Expenditures
Liberal	Ray Bonin	19,489	48.85	-8.34	$43,205
New Democratic	Elie Martel	13,355	33.48	+10.37	$62,794
Reform	Neil Martin	4,771	11.96	-0.74	$13,794
Progressive Conservative	Reg Couldridge	1,763	4.42	-1.01	$5,596
Canadian Action	Don Scott	369	0.92	–	$1,181
Natural Law	Mitchell Hibbs	145	0.36	-0.03	
Total valid votes/Expense limit		39,892	100.00	$65,400	

1993 Canadian federal election: Nickel Belt
Party	Candidate	Votes	%	±%	Expenditures
Liberal	Ray Bonin	25,237	57.19	+33.62	$42,807
New Democratic Party	John Rodriguez	10,197	23.11	−21.62	$52,551
Reform	Janice Weitzel	5,604	12.70		$4,156
Progressive Conservative	Ian Munro	2,395	5.43	−15.32	$4,808
National	Brian Woods	346	0.78		$0
Natural Law	Daniel Jolicoeur	173	0.39		$533
Non-Affiliated	Ernie Ashick	122	0.27		$571
Abolitionist	Cindy Burton	53	0.12		$0
Total valid votes		44,127	100.00		
Total rejected ballots		329			
Turnout		44,456	70.71	−5.47	
Electors on the lists		62,869			
Source: Thirty-fifth General Election, 1993: Official Voting Results, Published by the Chief Electoral Officer of Canada. Financial figures taken from official contributions and expenses provided by Elections Canada.

1988 Canadian federal election: Nickel Belt
Party	Candidate	Votes	%	±%	Expenditures
New Democratic	John Rodriguez	17,418	44.73	+6.13	$39,240
Liberal	Pierre Legros	9,178	23.57	−5.98	$36,271
Progressive Conservative	Richard Berthiaume	8,080	20.75	−10.45	$35,830
Confederation of Regions	Billie Christiansen	4,066	10.44		$9,695
Rhinoceros	Keith Claven	202	0.52	−0.13	$330
Total valid votes		38,944	100.00		
Total rejected ballots		147			
Turnout		39,091	76.18		
Electors on the lists		51,312			
Note: Percentage change numbers are not factored for redistribution.

1984 Canadian federal election: Nickel Belt
Party	Candidate	Votes	%	±%
New Democratic	John Rodriguez	17,141	38.60	−3.46
Progressive Conservative	Gord Slade	13,857	31.20	+21.00
Liberal	Judy Erola	13,124	29.55	−17.97
Rhinoceros	Derek Aardvark Orford	288	0.65	–
Total valid votes		44,410	100.00	
Total rejected ballots		250	0.01	
Turnout		44,660	79.55	
Electors on the lists		56,139		

1980 Canadian federal election: Nickel Belt
Party	Candidate	Votes	%	±%
Liberal	Judy Erola	19,805	47.52	+8.97
New Democratic	John Rodriguez	17,529	42.06	−1.31
Progressive Conservative	Dennis Tappenden	4,250	10.20	−7.63
Marxist–Leninist	David Starbuck	89	0.21	−0.04
Total valid votes		41,673	100.00	
Total rejected ballots		119		
Turnout		41,792	75.18	−1.90
Electors on the lists		55,587		

1979 Canadian federal election: Nickel Belt
Party	Candidate	Votes	%	±%
New Democratic	John Rodriguez	17,772	43.37	−6.41
Liberal	Judy Erola	15,799	38.55	+0.65
Progressive Conservative	Harwood Nesbitt	7,308	17.83	+5.51
Marxist–Leninist	David Starbuck	103	0.25	
Total valid votes		40,982	100.00	
Total rejected ballots		115		
Turnout		41,097	77.08	−0.28
Electors on the lists		53,320		
Note: Percentage change numbers are not factored for redistribution.

1974 Canadian federal election: Nickel Belt
Party	Candidate	Votes	%	±%
New Democratic	John Rodriguez	17,668	49.78	+3.75
Liberal	Gil Mayer	13,451	37.90	−1.79
Progressive Conservative	Ralph Connor	4,371	12.32	−0.20
Total valid votes		35,490	100.00	
Total rejected ballots		97		
Turnout		35,587	77.36	−1.65
Electors on the lists		46,001		
lop.parl.ca

1972 Canadian federal election: Nickel Belt
Party	Candidate	Votes	%	±%
New Democratic	John Rodriguez	14,033	46.03	+8.46
Liberal	Gaetan Serré	12,101	39.69	−5.41
Progressive Conservative	Bernie White	3,817	12.52	−4.81
Social Credit	Donat Breault	534	1.75	
Total valid votes		30,485	100.00	
Total rejected ballots		4,718		
Turnout		35,203	79.01	
Electors on the lists		44,556		
Note: The number of rejected ballots is not a misprint. Gaetan Serré initially called for these ballots to be reviewed, but withdrew his request on November 14, 1972 after viewing a sample. Source: "Review cancelled", Globe and Mail, 14 November 1972, 8. Source for results: Official Voting Results, Office of the Chief Electoral Officer (Canada), 1972.

1968 Canadian federal election
Party	Candidate	Votes	%	±%
Liberal	Gaetan Serré	11,551	45.10	+5.64
New Democratic	Norman Fawcett	9,621	37.57	-3.75
Progressive Conservative	Cecil Fielding	4,439	17.33	+19.23
Total valid votes		25,611	100.00	

1965 Canadian federal election
Party	Candidate	Votes	%	±%
New Democratic	Norman Fawcett	10,863	41.32	+22.84
Liberal	Osias Godin	10,374	39.46	-5.72
Progressive Conservative	Roger Landry	5,055	19.23	-5.25
Total valid votes		26,292	100.00	

1963 Canadian federal election
Party	Candidate	Votes	%	±%
Liberal	Osias Godin	13,414	45.18	-11.74
Progressive Conservative	John MacLean	7,268	24.48	-4.54
New Democratic	Carl Maitland Griffith	5,486	18.48	+7.80
Social Credit	Oscar Degarie	3,524	11.87	+8.48
Total valid votes		29,692	100.00	

1962 Canadian federal election
Party	Candidate	Votes	%	±%
Liberal	Osias Godin	16,440	56.92	+9.82
Progressive Conservative	Don Gillis	8,381	29.02	-4.94
New Democratic	Philippe Deaken	3,085	10.68	-8.26
Social Credit	Oscar Degarie	978	3.39	
Total valid votes		28,884	100.00	

Note: NDP vote is compared to CCF vote in 1958 election.

1958 Canadian federal election
Party	Candidate	Votes	%	±%
Liberal	Osias Godin	11,866	47.10	+4.50
Progressive Conservative	Anthony Falzetta	8,556	33.96	-2.22
Co-operative Commonwealth	Harold Prescott	4,772	18.94	-2.29
Total valid votes		25,194	100.00	

1957 Canadian federal election
Party	Candidate	Votes	%	±%
Liberal	Léo Gauthier	8,819	42.60	-15.97
Progressive Conservative	Anthony Falzetta	7,490	36.18	+15.30
Co-operative Commonwealth	Harold A. Prescott	4,395	21.23	+5.23
Total valid votes		20,704	100.00	

1953 Canadian federal election
Party	Candidate	Votes	%
Liberal	Léo Gauthier	8,821	58.56
Progressive Conservative	Alistair MacLean	3,144	20.87
Co-operative Commonwealth	Gilles Lefebvre	2,410	16.00
Labor–Progressive	Harold Arthur Proctor	687	4.56
Total valid votes		15,062	100.00

== See also ==
- List of Canadian electoral districts
- Historical federal electoral districts of Canada
