= Raymond Bonin =

Canadian politician (born 1942)

Raymond C. Bonin

Member of Parliament for Nickel Belt
- In office October 25, 1993 – October 14, 2008
- Preceded by: John Rodriguez
- Succeeded by: Claude Gravelle

Personal details
- Born: November 20, 1942 (age 83) Sudbury, Ontario
- Party: Liberal
- Profession: Teacher

Raymond C. "Ray" Bonin (born November 20, 1942) is a former Canadian politician. He was a Liberal member of the House of Commons of Canada, representing the riding of Nickel Belt, from 1993 to 2008. Prior to entering politics, he was a teacher at Sudbury's Cambrian College. He was also chairman of the French Catholic school board from 1976 to 1985, and was a city councillor from 1988 to 1991.

On November 16, 2006, Bonin announced that he would not run for reelection in the 2008 federal election. Former Greater Sudbury city councillor Louise Portelance won the nomination to stand as the new Liberal candidate for Nickel Belt, but was defeated by Claude Gravelle of the New Democratic Party on election day.
