= Navajo cops =

Navajo Cops is a "reality" television series about the real life Navajo Nation Police. It is produced for National Geographic Channel by Flight 33 Productions. The program began as a one-hour pilot episode which aired in May 2011. A six-part series will premiere on National Geographic channel in March 2012. The style and format of the series is similar to other National Geographic Channel law enforcement programs such as Border Wars, Alaska State Troopers, and Wild Justice.

== Background ==
In the spring of 2011, the National Geographic Channel aired a 1-hour pilot episode for a new documentary series called "Navajo Cops". The program was developed by Flight 33 Productions & was written & produced by Samuel K. Dolan (who pitched the concept). The pilot, which followed the officers of the Navajo Nation Police and the Navajo Rangers was filmed in 2010 and premiered on Wednesday, May 11, 2011 to positive ratings. In the Summer of 2011 it was announced that the series had been picked up for 6 additional episodes. The series, which highlights the hard work and daily sacrifices of the men & women of the Navajo Nation Police Department, premiered in March 2012. It was filmed primarily in the Window Rock, Chinle, Kayenta and Tuba City Police Districts, with some segments also filmed in Shiprock & Crownpoint, New Mexico. Louis Tarantino and Douglas Cohen are the Executive Producers (for Flight 33 Productions) & Tim Evans served as Supervising Producer, while Dolan served as Senior Producer and also directed several episodes. The series was written by Dolan and Steffen Schlachtenhaufen.

== Series Description ==
"In the heart of the American Southwest, the 320 cops of the Navajo Police patrol some of the most rugged territory in the United States. These modern day warriors are on a mission to protect the largest Indian reservation in North America, and to preserve an ancient way of life."

== Season One: 2012 ==
Following the success of the 2011 pilot episode, the first official series episode of "Navajo Cops" premiered on Monday, March 12, 2012. New episodes aired every Monday thereafter on National Geographic for 6 weeks. Each episode was 1 hour long & followed police officers in the various Navajo Nation Police Districts. Some officers make appearances in multiple episodes, such as Officer Perry Champagne, Officer Chris Holgate, and Officer Philbert Toddy. Several episodes also feature officers from the Navajo Rangers and the Navajo Department of Fish & Wildlife.
