= Little Valentine River =

Little Valentine River petite rivière Valentine
- Location of the mouth of the Little Valentine River in Ontario

Location
- Country: Canada
- Province: Ontario
- District: Cochrane
- Part: Cochrane, Unorganized, North

Physical characteristics
- Source: unnamed swamp
  - location: Way Township
  - coordinates: 49°40′15″N 83°51′21″W
  - elevation: 257 m (843 ft)
- Mouth: Valentine River
  - location: Stoddart Township
  - coordinates: 49°44′05″N 83°57′37″W
  - elevation: 238 m (781 ft)
- Length: 19.3 km (12.0 mi)
- Basin size: 40.2 km^{2} (15.5 sq mi)

Basin features
- Progression: Valentine River→ Lac Pivabiska→ Pivabiska River→ Missinaibi River→ Moose River→ James Bay
- River system: Moose River drainage basin

The Little Valentine River (French: petite rivière Valentine)is a river in the Unorganized North Part of Cochrane District in northeastern Ontario, Canada. It is in the Moose River drainage basin, and is a right tributary of the Valentine River.

== Course ==
The Valentine River begins in an unnamed swamp in geographic Way Township and flows west into geographic Irish Township. It turns northwest, enters geographic Stoddart Township, and reaches its mouth at the Valentine River. The Valentine River flows via the Pivabiska River, the Missinaibi River and the Moose River to James Bay.
