= Valentine River =

River in Ontario, Canada

Valentine River rivière Valentine
- Location of the mouth of the Valentine River in Ontario

Location
- Country: Canada
- Province: Ontario
- District: Cochrane
- Part: Cochrane, Unorganized, North

Physical characteristics
- Source: Valentine Lake
  - location: Stoddart Township
  - coordinates: 49°43′03″N 84°03′02″W
  - elevation: 249 m (817 ft)
- Mouth: Lac Pivabiska
  - location: Hanlan Township
  - coordinates: 49°49′13″N 83°44′33″W
  - elevation: 235 m (771 ft)

Basin features
- Progression: Lac Pivabiska→ Pivabiska River→ Missinaibi River→ Moose River→ James Bay
- River system: Moose River drainage basin
- Tributaries
  - right: Little Valentine River

The Valentine River (French: rivière Valentine) is a river in the Unorganized North Part of Cochrane District in northeastern Ontario, Canada. It is in the Moose River drainage basin, and is a tributary of Lac Pivabiska, the source of the Pivabiska River.

== Course ==
The Valentine River begins at Valentine Lake in geographic Stoddart Township and flows northeast to take in the right tributary Little Valentine River. It heads north under Ontario Highway 11 and the Ontario Northland Railway Calstock–Cochrane branch (originally part of the National Transcontinental Railway), continues north to enter Fushimi Provincial Park, then arrives at Fushimi Lake as that lake's main inflow, where it enters geographic Bannerman Township at the northeast of the lake. It leaves the park and lake at the northeast and heads east over The Chutes into Hanlan Lake, then southeast into geographic Hanlan Township and past the settlement of Fontaine's Landing into Wolverine Lake. The river then continues east to its mouth at Lac Pivabiska, the source of the Pivabiska River. The Pivabiska River flows via the Missinaibi River and the Moose River to James Bay.

== Tributaries ==
- Wolverine Creek (left)
- French Creek (right)
- Brulé Creek (right)
- Penhall Creek (right)
- Little Valentine River (right)
