= TFO =

French-language TV network in Ontario

- TFO logo
- Broadcast area: National via satellite, available on basic cable throughout Ontario and parts of Manitoba, New Brunswick and Quebec
- Headquarters: Toronto, Ontario

Programming
- Language: French
- Picture format: 1080i (HDTV) (2009–present); 480i (SDTV) (1987–present)

Ownership
- Owner: Groupe Média TFO
- Parent: Government of Ontario
- Sister channels: TVO

History
- Launched: January 1, 1987
- Former names: La Chaîne TVO (1987–1997)

Links
- Website: tfo.org (in French)

TFO (Télévision française de l'Ontario) is a Canadian French language educational television channel and media organization serving the province of Ontario. It is operated by the Ontario French-language Educational Communications Authority (French: Office des télécommunications éducatives de langue française de l'Ontario, OTÉLFO), a Crown corporation owned by the Government of Ontario and trading as Groupe Média TFO. It is the only French-language television service in Canada that operates entirely outside Quebec. The network airs cultural programming, including blocks of French-language children's programs, along with original series, documentaries, and films.

The network was first established in 1987 as La Chaîne TVO, a spin-off of the provincial English-language public broadcaster TVO, later re-branding as TFO in 1997. The network operated under the auspices of TVO until 2007, when it was spun off into an autonomous agency.

TFO is available on multichannel television providers throughout Ontario; all cable and IPTV providers in the province are required to carry it on their basic tier. TFO is also carried nationally on the Bell Satellite TV and Shaw Direct satellite television services. The network previously broadcast over-the-air in some communities in Eastern and Northern Ontario with significant Franco-Ontarian populations; these transmitters ceased operations in 2012.

Groupe Média TFO also manages 200 websites, 20 mobile applications and games, 15 subscription platforms, 14 social media platforms and various YouTube channels.

== History ==
When TVO (then known as TVOntario) launched in 1970, it aired French-language programming on Sundays from noon until sign-off. By the 1980s, the provincial government concluded that a separate francophone educational network was needed to prevent the "ghettoization" of the Franco-Ontarian community.

In 1985, the Ontario Ministry of Municipal and Cultural Affairs, together with Communications Canada, approved the creation of an Ontario-based French-language educational television network. At the time, the only portions of Ontario with access to a dedicated francophone educational television service were the National Capital Region and the Ottawa Valley, which were served by Radio-Québec outlet CIVO-TV in Hull. In 1986, the new network received its broadcast licence from the Canadian Radio-television and Telecommunications Commission (CRTC). On January 1, 1987, this network was officially launched by the Ontario Educational Communications Authority under the name La Chaîne TVO (primarily known on-air as La Chaîne). In 1997, La Chaîne was renamed TFO (short for Télévision française de l'Ontario). The company would remain a part of TVO until 2007 when it was transferred to the Ontario French-language Educational Communications Authority, a separate crown corporation. It is the only French-language television broadcaster in Canada headquartered outside Quebec.

For the first decade of La Chaîne's operations, TVO's existing practice of broadcasting in French on Sundays continued, and La Chaîne aired English-language programming during the same time block. This was because La Chaîne was only available on cable at first, and the government wanted to ensure that Franco-Ontarian viewers without cable still had access to a block of French-language programming while making English TVO programs available on La Chaîne for those who wanted them. As transmitters were added in several French-speaking communities, the practice was discontinued in the mid-1990s.

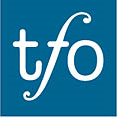
TFO's second logo from 1997 to 2001

In addition to being carried throughout Ontario on cable and via over-the-air transmitters in some communities, in October 1997 TFO began broadcasting in New Brunswick via select cable companies in that province. New Brunswick was the first jurisdiction other than Ontario where TFO was offered. TFO would later be broadcast into parts of Quebec as well. In 1998, the station began broadcasting nationally via both national satellite companies, Bell ExpressVu and Star Choice, now known as Bell Satellite TV and Shaw Direct, respectively. In August 2008, Star Choice removed TFO from its lineup. In 1999, TFO's parent company at the time, the Ontario Educational Communications Authority, applied to the CRTC for mandatory carriage of TFO in the province of Quebec, in addition to a carriage fee, which other over-the-air services do not receive. However, the CRTC denied its application in March 2000. That year Jacques Bensimon, co-founder of the network and managing director of the network since 1986 (before it became its own channel), resigned from the position. Over his tenure, he formed relationships between TFO and French-language networks in Europe, in order to share content. This included co-producing content with the BBC, France 2 and Channel 4 in the UK.

TFO's third logo from 2001 to 2012

TFO's fourth logo from 2012 to 2020

As part of a restructuring of TVO announced by the McGuinty government on June 29, 2006, TFO was taken over by a new, separate provincial Crown corporation, the Ontario French-Language Educational Communications Authority in 2007, with separate management and its own budget. Although the licence transfer was not officially approved by the CRTC until June 28, 2007, TFO nonetheless announced its autonomy from TVO effective April 1. GroupeMédia TFO is funded mainly by the Government of Ontario, through the Ministry of Education, with an annual budget of $31 million. Additional contributions have been made by the Government of Manitoba since the channel was added to cable services in that province in 2010.

In 2010, then TFO CEO Claudette Paquin was awarded the Commissioner of Official Language's Award of Excellence – Promotion of Linguistic Duality for her leadership in TFO's transition to more autonomy, and the work the channel has done to promote the development of the Franco-Ontarian community.

Starting in 2010, in response to increasing use of smartphones, tablets, computers, and smart boards, as well as new ways of watching televised content, such as binge-watching, TFO's board of directors initiated a technological shift to provide content for these platforms. In September 2010, Glenn O'Farrell was named president and CEO of OTÉLFO. In January 2011, Groupe Média TFO began the development YouTube channels, including Mini TFO, a children's channel. Groupe launched a Mini TFO application in Apple's App Store. To extend its programming for the Francophone community, Groupe Média TFO began a collaboration in 2012, with La Cité collégiale.

In 2013, Groupe Média TFO organized the Sommet des tablettistes, an international conference on the impact of new technologies on education, and in April 2014 initiated the EduLulu project, an evaluation service for educational applications in Canada.

TFO adapted its educational content designed for teachers to the digital environment, and the result was TFO Éducation, an interactive service offering teachers a collection of about 5,000 educational tools. The service has been licensed by 12 French-language school boards and 60 English-language school boards in Ontario

In 2015, TFO submitted a proposal to the CRTC that all BDUs and satellite TV providers in Canada be required to include the channel in their lineup. The CRTC declined the proposal.

In April 2016, TFO announced that it had established a partnership with Louisiana Public Broadcasting to syndicate 14 hours a week of French-language children's programming to the broadcaster's LPB2 service. The partnership is designed to appeal to Louisiana's strong French heritage and French immersion programs.

In December 2024, Xavier Brassard-Bédard, a former chief editor and director of TVA Nouvelles and LCN, was appointed as TFO's new chief executive officer.

== Television and web programming ==
At its launch in 1987, the channel's programming schedule included both original programming produced by the network, such as the educational comedy series 17, rue Laurier, the health series La santé contagieuse and the newsmagazine series M.E.M.O., and acquired programming from both Quebec and France, such as the children's series Passe-Partout and L'île aux enfants and the talk show Apostrophes. It also aired a francophone dub of the 1970s English Canadian children's series Matt and Jenny, under the title La route de l'amitié.

=== Main shows ===
GroupeMédia TFO broadcasts educational and cultural content for all of its audiences (children, youth, and adults). Programs that TFO produces include Mini TFO (for pre-school children), Mégallô (for children ages 9 to 12), RelieF (a political, social, and cultural program aired live Monday through Thursday), the sitcom Météo+, and Ruby TFO, a Web/TV magazine for women. TFO's prime time programming includes documentaries and dramatic series, along with unique French-language film programming, including feature-length art films and films from around the world. CinéTFO is the network's nightly showing of French-language cinema.

=== Music programming ===
BRBR is another music show, featuring reviews, interviews, and performances from French-speaking artists. The concerts take place in downtown Toronto and Montreal in front of live crowds. The show has been nominated for several Gemini Awards. In October 2013 BRBR teamed with Deezer to launch an online radio station dedicated to the music of Francophone Canadians. Other music programming includes the series Behind the Scenes, which shows the backstage, studio, and other parts of the music industry generally hidden from the public eye. TFO also broadcasts the singing competition reality show JAM.

=== Mini TFO ===
Mini TFO provides YouTube channels for young children, receiving 25 million views between its launch and October 2014—the second most views of any children's channel in the world. TFO has also focused on mobile broadcasting, developing several apps for children's use. Other apps are developed to provide parents with a rating and research mechanism when deciding between programming and apps developed for child viewers or educational use - such as EduLulu. In 2013, Mini TFO also opened the Mini TFO Centre for Early Childhood Education at Collège Boréal. The channel also sponsors live tours of its affiliated acts, specifically in remote areas of Ontario. Children's programming on TFO is integrated into its web programming, which includes mobile applications designed for child development. TFO also produces reality television shows featuring kids, including the Amazing Race style series Les Jumelles where local kids compete against each other in teams of two.

=== Cartoons ===
Cartoons broadcast on TFO include:

- 64, rue du Zoo aka 64 Zoo Lane
- Adibou (listed as Adibou: aventure dans le corps humain on guides)
- Les aventures d'Olive l'autruche
- Bande de Sportifs
- Bing
- Bitz et Bob
- Bookaboo
- Bouba aka Jacky and Jill
- Caillou
- Charlie et Lola
- Christopher, Josée et Lexie
- Le club des cinq: nouvelles enquetes
- Dimitri
- Dinopaws
- Dinosaur Train
- Dipdap
- Doodleboo
- Les Doozers
- Drôles de petites bêtes
- Ernest et Celestine
- Gribouille
- Guess How Much I Love You
- Guess with Jess
- Kioka
- Louie
- Lulu Zipadoo
- MaXi
- Maya l'abeille
- Minivers
- Miss Spider et Cie
- Mouk
- Les Mystères d'Alfred
- Peg et Chat
- La petite école d'Hélène
- Petz Club
- Ping et ses amis
- Pinky Dinky Doo
- Les Popilous
- Poppy Cat
- Le Ranch
- La Rêve de Champlain
- Rob le Robot
- Ruff-Ruff, Tweet and Dave
- Sagwa, les aventures de la chat Siamoise
- The Secret World of Benjamin Bear
- SOS creatures!
- Sports Band
- Stella et Sacha
- Subway Surfers: Le serie d'animation aka Subway Surfers: The Animated Series
- Tib et Tatoum
- Tip the Mouse
- Tractor Tom
- Le village de Dany
- Wendy
- Wubby School
- Zack and Quack
- Zoubi Doubi

=== Other programming ===
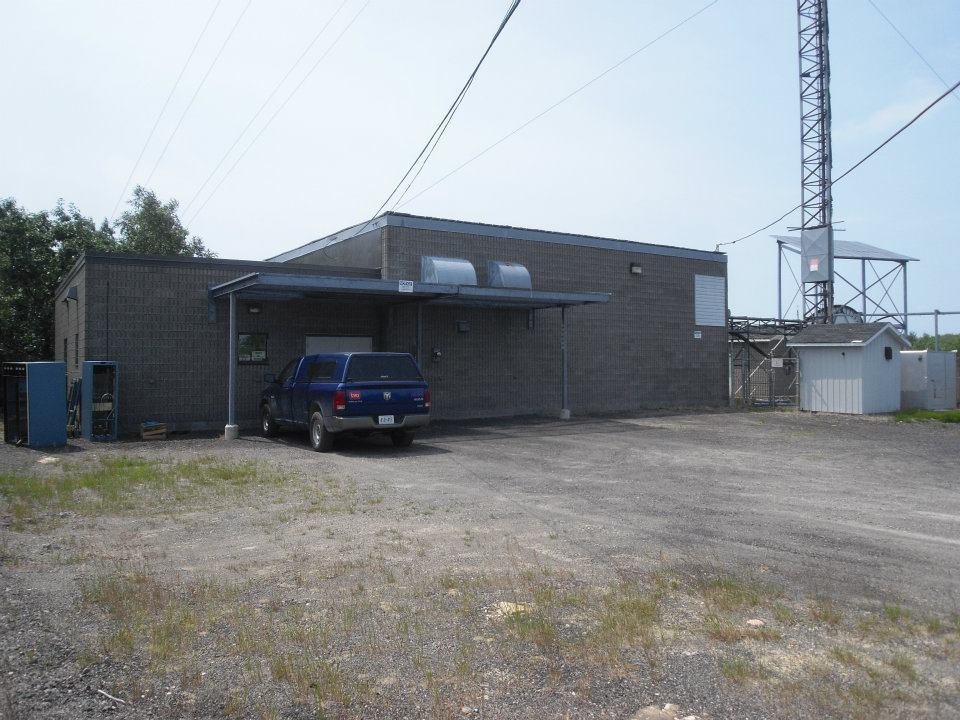
Staff shuttering TVO/TFO tower in Sudbury July 12, 2012

TFO also broadcasts the news and culture show TFO 360, hosted by Linda Godin, who has also moderated debates between national party leaders in Canada. Plein les Vues serves as TFO's entertainment news show. On the web, it runs SOS Devoirs, a series of web properties designed to help children with their homework used by 90,000 students each year. The TFO website also provides curriculum support, pedagogical guides, and 4,000 different educational programs (1600 available for free). TFO itself has training programs to teach educators how to use video materials in the classroom, attended by 2,000 teachers per year. TFO is Canada's largest producer and distributor of French-language educational products.

== Former transmitters ==
From 1989 to 2012, TFO operated several over-the-air transmitters in predominantly francophone areas of Eastern and Northern Ontario. These transmitters had the callsign CHLF-TV, followed by a number to denote their status as rebroadcasters. Besides Sudbury, Hawkesbury, Temiskaming Shores and Pembroke, TFO otherwise transmitted over the air mainly in isolated portions of Northern Ontario without access to cable.

As part of the transfer of TFO to its own management in 2007, the transmitters in Sultan, Oba and Jogues were taken out of service. On July 31, 2012, TFO shut down its transmitters in Sudbury, Hawkesbury, Pembroke and Lac-Sainte-Thérèse, as TVO, which owned the towers, was shutting down and decommissioning all its analog transmitters on that day. As of December 2012, the station no longer has any over-the-air transmitters as evidenced by the disappearance from Industry Canada's TV spectrum database of TFO's over-the-air transmitters.

Station	City of licence	Analogue channel	Digital channel	ERP	HAAT	Transmitter coordinates	CRTC Decision	Notes
CHLF-TV	Sudbury	25 (UHF)	20	282.5 kW	171.9 m	46°25′29″N 81°0′53″W	87-737	First transmitter, launched January 1, 1987, as CISF-TV-1
CHLF-TV-2	Hawkesbury	39 (UHF)	31	10 kW	100 m	45°30′7″N 74°41′16″W	87-737	Put into service on March 1, 1989, as CHLF-TV
CHLF-TV-3	Evanturel	22 (UHF)		0.02 kW	NA	47°47′55″N 79°49′18″W	90-266	near Englehart
CHLF-TV-4	Harris	16 (UHF)		0.02 kW	NA	47°31′1″N 79°36′33″W	90-267	near Temiskaming Shores
CHLF-TV-5	Hawk Junction	19 (UHF)		0.02 kW	NA	48°5′16″N 84°33′43″W	90-268	
CHLF-TV-6	Lac-Sainte-Thérèse	32 (UHF)		0.02 kW	NA	49°47′30″N 83°39′10″W	90-269	
CHLF-TV-7	Mishkeegogamang	20 (UHF)		0.02 kW	NA	51°13′57″N 90°14′1″W	90-270	
CHLF-TV-9	Brethour	26 (UHF)		0.02 kW	NA	47°42′34″N 79°34′1″W	90-264	
CHLF-TV-10	Longlac	17 (UHF)		0.04 kW	NA	49°46′38″N 86°31′41″W	90-931	
CHLF-TV-12	Summer Beaver	11 (VHF)		0.005 kW	NA	52°45′1″N 88°30′48″W	91-2	
CHLF-TV-13	Pembroke	17 (UHF)	39	113.8 kW	188 m	45°50′2″N 77°9′49″W	91-290	
CHLF-TV-14	Kirby's Corner	51 (UHF)		0.04 kW	NA	46°42′49″N 84°16′39″W	91-846	
CHLF-TV-15	Kaboni	28 (UHF)		0.04 kW	NA	45°40′15″N 81°45′31″W	92-295	
CHLF-TV-16	Val Rita	28 (UHF)		0.02 kW	NA	49°26′47″N 82°32′19″W	95-789	
CHLF-TV-18	Nakina	9 (VHF)		0.01 kW	NA	50°10′43″N 86°42′23″W	99-463	
