= Deep Time History =

- Genre: Documentary
- Directed by: Wade Carney, Gabriel Rotello
- Narrated by: Jonathan Markley
- Composer: 5 Alarm Music
- Country of origin: United States
- Original language: English
- No. of episodes: 3

Production
- Executive producer: Douglas Cohen
- Producer: Sven Berkemeier
- Cinematography: Tom Collins
- Production companies: CuriosityStream; Flight 33 Productions

Original release
- Network: CuriosityStream
- Release: 22 July – 22 July 2016

Deep Time History is an original documentary series that was released on the video on demand service CuriosityStream, in partnership with production company Flight 33 Productions. The three-part series was included in CuriosityStream's January 2015 launch announcement. The three-part series is hosted by California State University Fullerton Associate Professor Jonathan Markley and exposes the secret drivers behind human history, revealing the sometimes unexpected answers to questions of how and why civilization as it is known exists today. It provides a look at how deep time has precipitated crucial events in human history. Each 50-minute episode dives into how physics, geology, biology and chemistry—forces as far back as the formation of the Earth—have influenced world history as much as human innovations, political decisions or battlefield victories. All three episodes were released in July 2016.

== Episodes ==
1. "The Rise of Civilization" (written and directed by Gabriel Rotello, aired July 22, 2016) – "About 8,000 BC, in a few select places some people begin to experiment with a new way of harvesting energy." They're growing their own crops. An act so simple, it's hard to believe it will kick start a revolution. But it will. "These are the first seeds, literally, of the rise of civilization."
2. "Age of Discovery" (aired July 22, 2016) – "Columbus has no idea that because of Earth's geology and geography he won't get to his destination...or how that epic failure will make his voyage one of the most influential expeditions in the history of humankind. Let's add an asteroid hitting the earth billions of years ago and connect the dots."
3. "The Industrial Revolution and Modern Warfare" (aired July 22, 2016) – The Industrial Revolution and the rise of modern warfare have roots in the depths of time—in the natural process that enriches the soil. How do prehistoric forests link to the development of steam engines, and the rise of modern industry?

== See also ==
- Big History
- Guns, Germs, and Steel
