= Patton 360° =

American television World War 2 documentary series

- DVD cover
- Also known as: Patton 360
- Genre: Documentary
- Written by: Samuel K. Dolan; Jim Hense
- Country of origin: United States
- Original language: English
- No. of seasons: 1
- No. of episodes: 10

Production
- Production company: Flight 33 Productions

Original release
- Network: History Channel
- Release: April 10 – June 26, 2009

Related
- Dogfights; Battle 360°

Patton 360°, also written as Patton 360, is a weekly television series that originally ran from April 10 to June 26, 2009, on the History Channel. It was produced by Flight 33 Productions in Los Angeles (the same company that produced Battle 360°), and features a mixture of CGI, archival footage, recreations, and interviews with World War II veterans and historians. The series follows General George S. Patton and the units he commanded, from the Operation Torch landings in Morocco in 1942, through the campaigns in North Africa and Sicily, and in the battles across Northwest Europe.

The episodes were written by Samuel K. Dolan and Jim Hense, and produced by Rob Beemer, Brian Thompson, Samuel K. Dolan, associate producer Ryan Hurst, and executive producers Louis Tarantino and Douglas Cohen for Flight 33 Productions and Carl Lindahl for the History channel.

== Veterans ==
The producers of Patton 360 interviewed dozens of veterans for the series. Among the veteran contributors were Medal of Honor recipients Walter Ehlers, John D. Hawk and Distinguished Service Cross recipients Maj. General Kelley B. Lemmon Jr., Colonel James Herbert (Jimmie) Leach and Major Abraham Baum. Retired Brigadier General Albin Irzyk and retired Lieutenant General Orwin C. Talbott were also interviewed. The series included interviews from dozens of other veterans, both enlisted soldiers and retired commissioned officers, who served in the many Infantry and Armored Divisions that Patton fought with in North Africa, Sicily and with Third Army in Europe.

Among the divisions covered in the series were the 1st Infantry Division, the 4th Armored Division, the 2nd Armored Division, 5th Infantry Division, 90th Infantry Division, and 95th Infantry Division. Veterans from numerous independent tank battalions, artillery units, and anti-tank battalions were also covered in the program. Two naval veterans, Captain Franklyn Dailey, Jr. (USS Philadelphia) and Arthur Beaumont (USS Dallas) were also interviewed. William McBurney appeared in several of the later episodes and recounted his stories as a member of the 761st Tank Battalion.

The final episode of the series was dedicated to veteran Fred Cottriel of the 737th Tank Battalion, who died in 2008 only days after conducting an interview with the show's producers.

== Notable commentator ==
Among the many commentators in the series was Colonel H. R. McMaster.

== Episodes ==
No.	Title	Original release date
1	"Blood & Guts"	April 10, 2009
Patton and the U.S. Army invade North Africa and encounter surprisingly strong pro-Nazi French forces. When a ceasefire is declared, Patton enters the city of Casablanca in triumph.
2	"Rommel’s Last Stand"	April 17, 2009
American forces are humiliated at Kasserine Pass, but Patton heads to the front, whips the poorly trained troops into shape, and leads them to victory at El Guettar and eventually, with the help of the British, all of North Africa.
3	"Baptism of Blood"	April 24, 2009
Although Patton and the Allies come up against a surprise counterattack by Italian tanks, they successfully hold the beaches and prepare to push into Sicily to capture the island’s capital, Palermo.
4	"Rogue General"	May 1, 2009
Facing a well-entrenched German Army, Patton races against his British Allies to claim the vital city of Messina. But instead of a hero’s welcome, the general is relieved of his command for slapping two soldiers.
5	"American Blitzkrieg"	May 8, 2009
As a ruse to fool the Germans about D-Day, Patton commands a fictitious army in England. Only after the invasion succeeds is he finally able to lead the lightning-fast armored assaults for which he is famous.
6	"Leading the Charge"	May 15, 2009
Patton’s Third Army tear through France, moving faster and seizing more territory than any army in history. Within a month they advance to within 60 miles of the German border.
7	"On Hitler’s Doorstep"	June 5, 2009
Patton’s command outruns its own supply lines, causing delays that allow the Germans to launch a major counterattack (Battle of Arracourt). But even with inferior tanks, the American emerge triumphant.
8	"Siege Warfare"	June 12, 2009
It takes Patton nearly two months to subdue the heavily fortified city of Metz, which is surrounded by nearly impenetrable concrete fortresses, but finally the Americans prove victorious.
9	"Battle of the Bulge"	June 19, 2009
Patton’s Third Army moves to relieve American units at the Siege of Bastogne, in Belgium. Despite the worst weather in 20 years, they break through German lines and relieve the beleaguered forces.
10	"Crushing the Third Reich"	June 26, 2009
Patton beats the British to the Rhine River, launches a rescue mission to save his son-in-law and liberates the Ohrdruf death camp. The war ends with an Allied victory, but before the year is over, the fabled general dies of injuries from a car accident.
