= Pierre Granger =

Canadian television journalist

Pierre Granger is a former Canadian television journalist, who was an anchor and reporter for Radio-Canada and TFO.

Originally from Montreal, Granger first moved to Ontario to study political science at the University of Windsor. He subsequently became a reporter and anchor for Radio-Canada's stations in Ontario, eventually becoming the primary anchor of Le Téléjournal Ontario. He joined TFO in 1996 as anchor of the network's nightly newsmagazine Panorama, until his retirement from the series in 2009. After retiring from the series he planned to become a freelance writer.
