= Battle 360° =

- An animated image of USS Enterprise on Battle 360°.
- Also known as: Battle 360
- Genre: Documentary / History / War / Military / Aviation
- Written by: Tony Long; Samuel K. Dolan
- Directed by: Tony Long
- Narrated by: Wally Kurth
- Composer: Eric Amdahl
- Country of origin: United States
- Original language: English
- No. of seasons: 1
- No. of episodes: 10

Production
- Executive producers: Louis C. Tarantino; Douglas J. Cohen
- Producers: Brian Thompson; Samuel K. Dolan
- Cinematography: Tom Collins; Jason Newfield; Chris Raymond
- Editors: Kyle Yaskin; Gina Vecchione
- Running time: 54 minutes (approx. without commercials)

Original release
- Network: History
- Release: February 29 – May 2, 2008

Battle 360°, also written as Battle 360, is an American documentary television series that originally aired from February 29 to May 2, 2008, on History. The program focuses on the World War II-era aircraft carrier USS Enterprise. The show was produced by Flight 33 Productions.

Battle 360° makes extensive use of animation to depict the story of Enterprise. The animation is combined with documentary footage, interviews of Enterprise crew members and military historians, and voice-over narration.

The series was written by Tony Long and Samuel K. Dolan, and produced by Brian Thompson, Samuel K. Dolan and Tim Evans. It is narrated by Wally Kurth. Military historians providing commentary included Alan Pietruszewski, First Sergeant William Bodette, Martin K. A. Morgan, Jonathan Parshall, and producer and story editor Samuel K. Dolan. The 3D graphics are by Crazybridge Studios, with additional graphics by Radical 3D; the visual effects supervisor is Steffen Schlachtenhaufen. The executive producers were Louis C. Tarantino and Douglas J. Cohen, and the associate producer was Ryan Hurst.

On February 29, 2008, the first episode of Battle 360° had 1.8 million viewers. At the time, that was the second-highest viewer total for a History channel series premiere, behind Ice Road Truckers.

The series original run was broadcast with limited commercial interruptions because of its sponsorship by Enterprise Rent-A-Car, whose founder, Jack Taylor, served on Enterprise as a fighter pilot during World War II.

Patton 360°, a spin-off series of Battle 360°, premiered on April 10, 2009 on the same channel.

== Veterans ==
Each episode of Battle 360 makes extensive use of veteran interviews from the sailors, pilots and Marines of USS Enterprise (CV-6). Many of these veterans' accounts appear as ongoing storylines throughout the series and the veterans themselves become regular characters. Among the veterans interviewed for the program are pilots Captain Donald "Flash" Gordon, Stanley "Swede" Vejtasa, Captain Norman "Dusty" Kleiss, Rear Admiral James D. Ramage, and Bruce McGraw. Among the ship's surviving crew interviewed for the series are Yeoman Willard Norberg, Roy E. Blood (1918–2015), Jack Glass, Arnold Olson and James Barnhill. Members of the ship's Marine Detachment are also interviewed including Louis Michot, Jack Maroney, Frank Graves, Richard Harte, Walter Keil and George E. Lanvermeier, Sr.

In addition to the Enterprise veterans, there are a number of veteran contributors from other vessels that fought with Enterprise, including sailors from USS Hornet (CV-8), USS Northampton (CA-26), USS North Carolina (BB-55), and USS Smith (DD-378).

== Episodes ==
The series consists of ten episodes.

No.	Title	Original release date
1	"Call to Duty"	February 29, 2008
The Attack on Pearl Harbor, the entry of the United States into World War II, the Marshall Islands Raid, and the Doolittle Raid.
2	"Vengeance at Midway"	March 7, 2008
The Battle of Midway.
3	"Jaws of the Enemy"	March 14, 2008
The Solomon Islands campaign and the beginning of the battle for Guadalcanal. Enterprise also receives a baptism of fire in the Battle of the Eastern Solomons.
4	"Bloody Santa Cruz"	March 21, 2008
The Solomon Islands campaign and the Battle of the Santa Cruz Islands.
5	"Enterprise versus Japan"	March 28, 2008
Fighting in the Naval Battle of Guadalcanal as the only American aircraft carrier active in the Pacific theater of war.
6	"The Grey Ghost"	April 4, 2008
The refitting and repair of Enterprise, and the battle for the Gilbert Islands.
7	"Hammer of Hell"	April 11, 2008
Assaulting Truk Lagoon as part of Operation Hailstone, including the first night radar bombing attack from a U.S. carrier.
8	"D-Day in the Pacific"	April 18, 2008
The Battle of the Philippine Sea, the largest aircraft carrier battle in history, and Enterprise's participation in the Saipan Campaign.
9	"Battle of Leyte Gulf"	April 25, 2008
The Battle of Leyte Gulf, the largest naval battle of World War II, and the Philippines Campaign of 1944–1945.
10	"The Empire's Last Stand"	May 2, 2008
The battles of Iwo Jima and Okinawa, night sorties, attacks by kamikazes, the end of World War II, and the legacy of Enterprise.

== Broadcast airings ==
Repeats of the series are currently airing on the digital broadcast network Quest. The show has also been rereleased on the Official YouTube Channel.
