= Wolverine Lake =

Wolverine Lake may refer to:

- Wolverine Lake (Cochrane District), a lake in Ontario, Canada
- Wolverine Lake, Michigan, a community in Michigan, United States
