= Ste.-Thérèse Creek =

Ste.-Thérèse Creek ruisseau Ste-Thérèse
- Location of the mouth of Ste.-Thérèse Creek in Ontario

Location
- Country: Canada
- Province: Ontario
- District: Cochrane
- Municipality or Part: Hearst; Cochrane District, Unorganized North Part

Physical characteristics
- Source: Unnamed marsh
  - location: Hearst
  - coordinates: 49°43′00″N 83°43′35″W
  - elevation: 249 m (817 ft)
- Mouth: Lac Ste. Thérèse
  - location: Casgrain Township
  - coordinates: 49°47′42″N 83°39′15″W
  - elevation: 236 m (774 ft)

Basin features
- River system: Moose River drainage basin

Ste.-Thérèse Creek (also Ste-Thérèse Creek; French: ruisseau Ste-Thérèse) is a stream in the town of Hearst and in the Unorganized North Part of Cochrane District in northeastern Ontario, Canada. It is in the Moose River drainage basin and is a tributary of Lac Ste. Thérèse (a lake).

== Course ==
The creek begins at an unnamed marsh in geographic Hanlan Township in the town of Hearst, flows northeast out of Hearst — but still in Hanlan Township — into Unorganized North Cochrane District, then continues northeast and passes into geographic Casgrain Township. The creek heads north, looping east then back west under Ontario Highway 583, and reaches its mouth at Lac Ste. Thérèse at the community of Lac-Sainte-Thérèse. Lac Ste.-Thérèse drains via the Pivabiska Narrows, Lac Pivabiska, the Pivabiska River, the Missinaibi River and the Moose River to James Bay.
