= Wolverine Lake (Cochrane District) =

- Location in Ontario
- Location: Cochrane District, Ontario
- Coordinates: 49°49′55″N 83°45′21″W
- Type: Lake
- Part of: James Bay drainage basin
- Primary inflows: Valentine River, Wolverine Creek
- Primary outflows: Valentine River
- Basin countries: Canada
- Max. length: 5.7 kilometres (3.5 mi)
- Max. width: 1.3 kilometres (0.81 mi)
- Surface elevation: 235 metres (771 ft)
- Settlements: Fontaine's Landing

Wolverine Lake is a lake in geographic Hanlan Township and geographic Bannerman Township in Cochrane District in Northeastern Ontario, Canada. It is in the James Bay drainage basin and is in the Valentine River system.

The primary inflows are the Valentine River, arriving from Hanlan Lake, at the southwest; and Wolverine Creek at the north. The primary outflow, at the east, is the Valentine River, which flows to Lac Pivabiska and then via the Pivabiska River, the Missinaibi River and the Moose River to James Bay.

== Tributaries ==
- Wolverine Creek
- Valentine River

== See also ==
- List of lakes in Ontario
