= Donald "Flash" Gordon =

American World War II flying ace

Donald Gordon
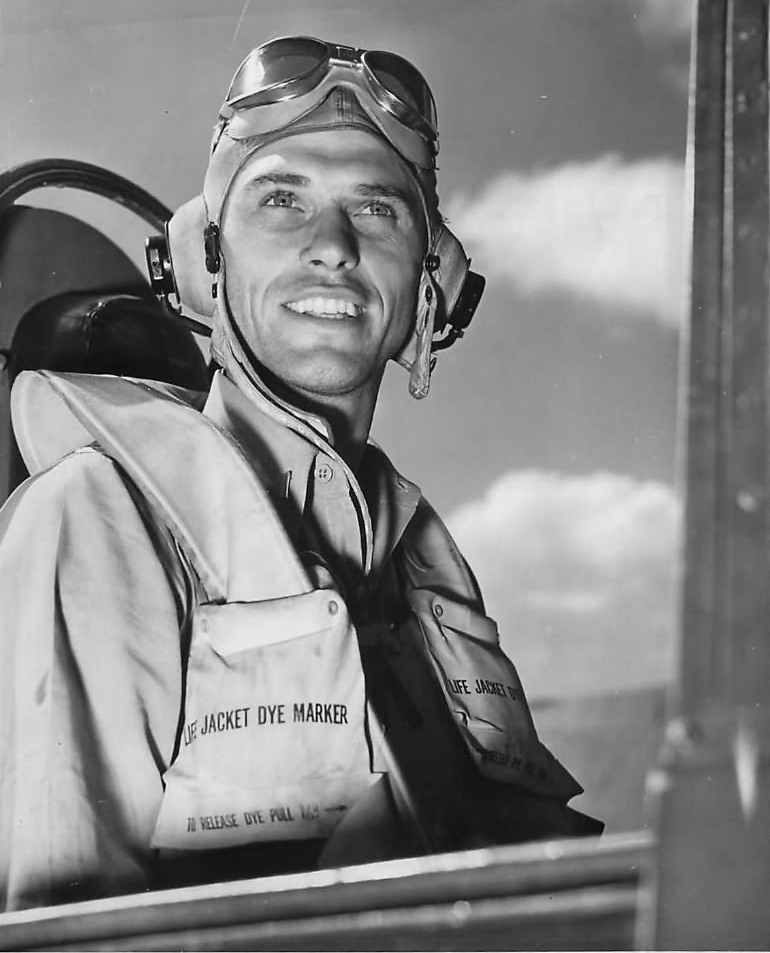
- Gordon in his Grumman F6F Hellcat, 1944
- Born: July 17, 1920; Garland, Kansas
- Died: January 4, 2010 (aged 89); La Jolla, California
- Military career
- Allegiance: United States
- Branch: United States Navy
- Service years: 1941–1967
- Rank: Captain
- Nickname: "Flash"
- Conflicts: World War II
- Awards: Distinguished Flying Cross (3); Air Medal (4); Navy Commendation Medal

Donald "Flash" Gordon (July 17, 1920 – January 4, 2010) was an American naval aviator and flying ace, having shot down at least seven Japanese aircraft during World War II. He was a fighter pilot in the United States Navy and a recipient of the Distinguished Flying Cross.

== Biography ==
Gordon's first recorded kill was during the Battle of the Santa Cruz Islands. Flying a Grumman F4F Wildcat and out of ammunition, he flew straight towards a Nakajima B5N that had just launched a torpedo towards USS Enterprise, forcing it into the ocean. Enterprise, despite being damaged in earlier attacks, was able to dodge the torpedo. On January 30, 1943, again flying a Wildcat and heading the Enterprise fighter group, nicknamed the 'Grim Reapers', Gordon shot down at least two Mitsubishi G4Ms who were heading for Enterprise and the damaged cruiser USS Chicago. Although G4M torpedoes sunk Chicago, only two out of eleven G4Ms survived the encounter with the Grim Reapers; the rest were shot down.

== Quotation ==
I never had a dogfight. I usually got head on or tail on. They never saw us coming. That's the way to fight a war.

== See also ==
- Battle 360° television series that aired on History (American TV channel)
- List of World War II aces from the United States
- Naval aviation
