= Marina Veilleux =

- locality
- Location in Ontario
- Coordinates: 49°47′47″N 83°42′54″W
- Country: Canada
- Province: Ontario
- District: Cochrane
- Part: Cochrane, Unorganized North
- Elevation: 243 m (797 ft)
- Time zone: UTC-5 (Eastern Time Zone)
  - Summer (DST): UTC-4 (Eastern Time Zone)
- Postal Code: P0L 1N0
- Area codes: 705, 249

Marina Veilleux is a marina and unincorporated locality in geographic Hanlan Township, Cochrane District in Northeastern Ontario, Canada. The community is counted as part of Unorganized Cochrane North Part in Canadian census data, and is located on Lac Pivabiska about 13 kilometres (8.1 mi) north northwest of Hearst. It serves as a jumping off point for travel on the lake.
