= JAM TFO =

- Also known as: JAM
- Genre: Reality, Musical, Variety, Youth
- Created by: Groupe Fair Play
- Directed by: Benoit Beauséjour
- Presented by: Patrick Groulx
- Country of origin: Canada
- Original language: French
- No. of seasons: 3
- No. of episodes: 20

Production
- Executive producers: Guy Villeneuve, Michel St-Cyr
- Producers: Marc Beaudet; Christiane Asselin; Claire Buffet
- Running time: 30 minutes
- Production company: Fair-Play Productions

Original release
- Network: TFO
- Release: September 2012 – November 2014

JAM is a Canadian television show that has aired on TFO since 2012 and is produced by Groupe Fair-Play. The series focuses on French Canadian comedian Patrick Groulx and seven French speaking singer-songwriters from Ontario between the ages of 15 and 24 years old.

== Description ==
Over the series, the aim is to bring the seven young emerging Franco-Ontarian musicians to the Francofolies de Montréal, where they will perform on the biggest francophone stage in North America. The programme has aired three series on TFO since September 2012.

It is presented in the format of 10 episodes, each episode focuses on one of the musicians and their prospective music careers. The last three episodes are filmed behind the scenes while the young musicians prepare for their live performance at the Francofolies. The live show features an original song by each of the seven musicians and ends with a group song. According to fairplay, the official producers, the show is described as such: "JAM features a group of young artists from the next generation of Franco-Ontarian singer-songwriters. Hosted by Patrick Groulx, JAM is part road trip, part musical bootcamp and mentorship program for up-and-coming musicians as they work and play their way to their first big onstage gig at Montreal’s FrancoFolies."

The series is filled with comedy as host Patrick Groulx sets challenges for the young musicians such as writing a song in five minutes whilst putting up with ridiculous distractions, singing an original song in a bizarre location, or showing up to a radio studio without notifying the host. At the end of the series, the seven musicians have three days to put together a live performance under the artistic direction of Edgar Bori and the participation of already successful house-band Pat Groulx et les Bas Blancs.

The program will return for a consecutive third season with young emerging musicians Anika-France Forget, Céleste Lévis, Jade Bernier, Mariam Mishriki, Max Nolet, Erika Lamon and Patrick Godin.

== List of musicians ==
=== Series 1 ===
- Gabrielle Goulet, Bourget
- Stéphanie Aubertin, Sturgeon Falls
- Anne Berniquez, Saint-Isidore
- Sarah Cruzoë, Orléans
- William Lamoureux, Gatineau-Ottawa
- Akeem Ouellet, Mattawa
- Philippe St-Arnaud, Cornwall

=== Series 2 ===
- James Zhao, Toronto
- Vanessa Thibodeau, Dubreuilville
- Raymond Piette, Hearst
- Venessa Lachance, Hearst
- Victoria Powell, Ottawa
- Yaovi Hoyi (YAO), Ottawa
- Philippe Brown et Michel Campeau, Ottawa

=== Series 3 ===
- Céleste Lévis, Timmins
- Erika Lamon, Elizabethtown-Kitley
- Jade Bernier, Angus
- Mariam Mishriki, Toronto
- Patrick Godin, Sudbury
- Maxime Nolet, Ottawa
- Anika-France Forget, Ottawa
