= Flip TFO =

Flip TFO is the children-oriented programming block of the Canadian French language educational television channel TFO, which serves the province of Ontario, Canada.

Its shows air weekday evenings and on afternoons and evenings during weekends.

== History ==
TFO launched its children-oriented block in 1996, labeling it Méga TFO. The block aired a live call-in show to serve as its anchor program also titled Méga TFO, hosted by Stephanie Broschart and Alain Boisvert. In 2001, the show was replaced by Mégallô, which had a similar format. In September 2009, the block amended its name to mirror the anchor program's title. In September 2013, the block was rebranded as Flip TFO along with the new main program, replacing Mégallô. In September 2017, the program was renamed Flip l'algorithme and much like its predecessors, attempts to present content in a humorous way.
