= James D. Ramage =

United States Navy admiral (1916–2012)

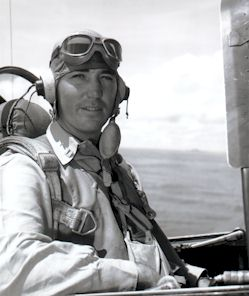
- Lieutenant Commander James D. Ramage in an SBD Dauntless aboard USS Enterprise during World War II
- Born: 19 July 1916; Waterloo, Iowa
- Died: 21 July 2012 (aged 96); Coronado, California
- Burial place: Fort Rosecrans National Cemetery, San Diego, California
- Military career
- Allegiance: United States of America
- Branch: United States Navy
- Service years: 1939–1976
- Rank: Rear Admiral
- Nickname: Jig Dog
- Commands: Carrier Division Seven; USS Independence; USS Salisbury Sound; Heavy Attack Wing 1 VC-3; Carrier Air Group 19; VB-98; VB-10
- Conflicts: World War II: Gilbert and Marshall Islands campaign; Attack on Truk Island; Landings at Hollandia; Mariana and Palau Islands campaign; Battle of the Philippine Sea; Vietnam War: Operation Rolling Thunder
- Awards: Navy Cross; Navy Distinguished Service Medal; Legion of Merit (4); Distinguished Flying Cross (2); Air Medal (6)

James D. "Jig Dog" Ramage (19 July 1916 – 21 July 2012) was a Naval Aviator in World War II, the Korean War, the Vietnam War and the Cold War, and was a driving force in putting nuclear-capable attack aircraft aboard aircraft carriers. Before retirement he attained the rank of rear admiral.

A graduate of the United States Naval Academy class of 1939, he served on the aircraft carrier USS Enterprise before being sent to the Naval Air Station Pensacola for flight training. He rejoined Enterprise in 1943, and became executive officer, and later commanding officer of Bombing Squadron Ten (VB-10), flying the SBD Dauntless dive bomber. He saw his first combat in the Battle of Kwajalein in January 1944, and participated in the attack on Truk in February and landings at Hollandia in April. During the Battle of the Philippine Sea in June 1944, he led 12 Dauntlesses and 17 other aircraft from Enterprise in a maximum-range twilight attack against the Japanese fleet, and was personally credited with crippling a Japanese aircraft carrier, probably Ryūhō. He later commanded Bombing Squadron Ninety-Eight (VB-98), a California-based training unit.

After the war, Ramage attended the first postwar class at the Naval War College, where he wrote a thesis on nuclear weapons and carrier aviation. He became the navigator of the escort carrier USS Bairoko, and participated in Operation Sandstone at Enewetak Atoll in April and May 1948. In March 1950, Ramage went to Sandia Base, where he was assigned to the Armed Forces Special Weapons Project (AFSWP), writing and reviewing nuclear war plans.

After becoming jet qualified in the F9F Panther, he assumed command of Carrier Air Group 19, which embarked for Korea on USS Oriskany. He then assumed command of Composite Squadron Three (VC-3), a large composite squadron that acted as a transitional training unit. He then became chief of the Sea Base Striking Forces Planning Unit (OP-05W) in the Office of the Chief of Naval Operations at The Pentagon in Washington, DC in June 1955, and then entered the National War College in July 1957. After graduating a year later, he assumed command as Commodore of Heavy Attack Wing One (HATWING ONE), the Atlantic Fleet A-3 Skywarrior wing at Naval Air Station Sanford, Florida, and then became commanding officer of the seaplane tender USS Salisbury Sound. He returned to the Office of the Chief of Naval Operations as head of Special Weapons Plans in 1961 and, in 1963, assumed command as commanding officer of the aircraft carrier USS Independence.

As a flag officer, he was Commander Fleet Air Naval Air Station Whidbey Island, Commander Carrier Division Seven during the Vietnam War, Commander Naval Air Reserve, and Commander Tenth Naval District/Caribbean Sea Frontier/Commander Fleet Air Caribbean from 1973 to 1975. He retired from active duty in 1975. He was involved in the ultimately successful campaign to rename Waterloo's ConWay Civic Center as the Five Sullivan Brothers Convention Center in honor of the Sullivan brothers, and appeared in The History Channel series Battle 360, in which he recounted many of his experiences as a member of VB-10.

== Early life ==
James David Ramage was born in Waterloo, Iowa, on 19 July 1916, the son of David S. and Flora Groat Ramage. He had an older half-sister Mary from his mother's first marriage, and a younger sister, Betty. His father was a machinist by trade, who arrived in Waterloo as a salesman. He became a farmer, but lost the farm during the Great Depression. He then worked at the Waterloo Trust and Savings Bank until it failed, and then ran a Maxwell and Chalmers car dealership. Ramage was educated in Waterloo at Francis Grout, McKinley School and finally East Waterloo High. In 1934, he entered Iowa State Teachers College in Cedar Falls, Iowa. That year, he was nominated for the United States Naval Academy at Annapolis, Maryland, by the local U.S. Representative, John W. Gwynne, as an alternative candidate. The 1934 Vinson-Trammell Act created additional vacancies at the Academy, and Ramage was appointed.

At the Academy, he acquired the nickname "Jig Dog" from the phonetic alphabet for his initials. He graduated from the Academy and was commissioned as an ensign on 1 June 1939. At his request, was posted to the aircraft carrier USS Enterprise, which was then based in Hawaii, as a deck officer. Through some crewmates, he met Orville Tyler, the Vice President of Bishop Bank. Ramage married his wife, Emeleen Tyler, on 4 September 1941, before leaving for flight training at the Naval Air Station Pensacola in Florida.

== World War II ==
The United States entered World War II while Ramage was in training at Pensacola, learning to fly on N3Ns, OS2Us and finally SNJs. On graduation in May 1942, he was posted to VS-3, a scouting squadron. He was promoted to lieutenant (junior grade) on 1 June 1942, and lieutenant on 1 August 1942. He returned to Hawaii, where he was assigned to the cruiser USS Salt Lake City in November. After some effort, he managed to get himself reassigned to the Enterprise.

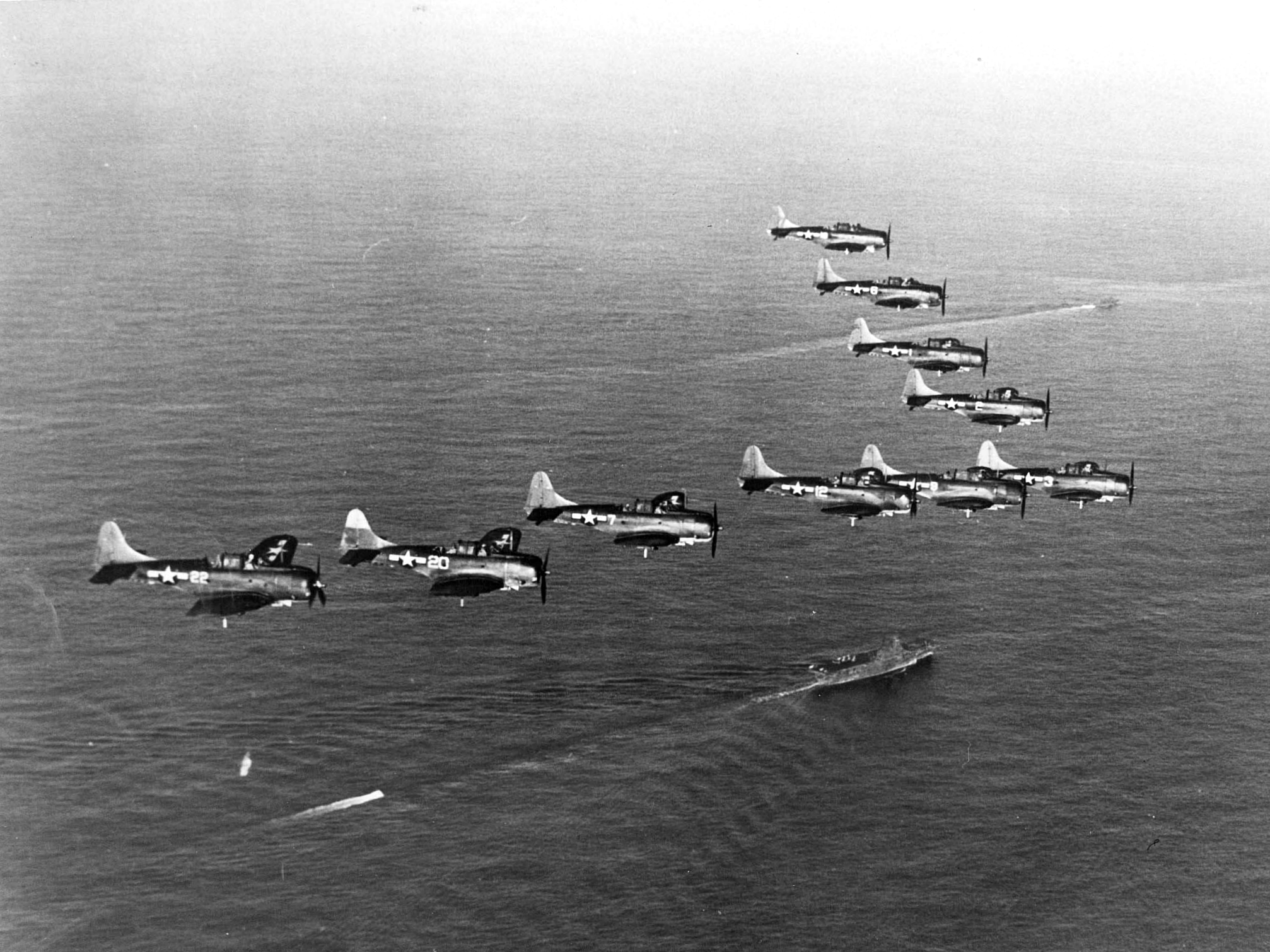
VB-10 over USS Enterprise (CV-6) led by LCDR Ramage, 30 March 1944.

Ramage reported to Enterprise in Noumea in February 1943. After qualifying to land on a carrier in Noumea in April 1943, he was assigned to Bombing Squadron Ten (VB-10), one of the carrier's two dive bomber squadrons flying the Douglas SBD Dauntless as its executive officer. Shortly afterwards, Enterprise returned to Pearl Harbor for overhaul, and Ramage returned to the United States with his wife. The squadrons of Carrier Air Group 10, of which VB-10 was a part, were reequipped with new aircraft, with VB-10 receiving new SBD-5s to replace its older SBD-3 models. Air Group 10 returned to Hawaii in November 1943, and the whole group qualified for night operation, making two night landings on Enterprise in January 1944. Ramage saw his first combat in the Battle of Kwajalein in January 1944, and participated in the attack on Truk in February and landings at Hollandia in April. He became commander of VB-10 in March.

On the evening of 20 June 1944, during the Battle of the Philippine Sea, Ramage led 12 Dauntlesses, 12 Grumman F6F Hellcats and 5 Grumman TBF Avenger torpedo bombers from Enterprise in the maximum-range attack against the Japanese fleet. He later recalled:

Shortly, our strike group was picked up by the Japanese combat air patrol. Cawley informed me that there were several Zeros on our port quarter, high. Each time they would commence a run on the base element, our Air Group Commander, "Killer" Kane, would nose into them with his F6Fs. The Japanese would break off the attack. They had decided to wait until our most vulnerable time, the point of roll into the attack. At that time the bomber and torpedo formation integrity would be broken as each pilot made his dive. Bombing Squadron Ten did not dive from an echelon. Rather, during the high speed run-in, the wingman gradually drifted back until the division leader rolled in. This preserved the "V" formation for as long as possible, permitting the gunners to concentrate on an attack from the rear from either side. It was standard procedure for the low fighter cover to strafe ahead of the base element, and the high cover to strafe behind. The fighters would proceed to the rendezvous point to provide cover for the aircraft of the base element as they rejoined and formed a defensive formation.

The Japanese fleet was easy to locate; there were black AA puffs over a wide area – also some colored detonations. Soon, I could make out two carriers below and to port. It was just as we had been briefed. I took the closest carrier and Bangs' division took the second carrier in the middle task group. Eason's torpedo planes split between the two. The TBFs carried four 500-lb general purpose bombs, while the SBDs each carried one 1000-lb bomb: half general purpose and half semi armor piercing.

As I rolled in, I had a fine view of the carrier. I split my dive brakes at about 10,000 feet. Shortly thereafter I could hear Cawley's twin thirties chattering; then I looked over to the right and within five feet of me, passing below, was a Zero. The dive brakes had thrown him off aim. My dive was a good, standard 70° attack. At about 5000 feet I opened up with my two 50-caliber machine guns. The tracers were going directly into the forward elevator. The carrier was steaming into the wind. Allowing for the wind and target motion, I moved the piper to just ahead of the bow of the carrier, and released at 1800 feet.

My First Division plus Van Eason's five TBMs dove on Ryuho. Bang's six plane division, upon sighting a third carrier, split into two sections with Bang's diving on Hiyo and Grubiss' section attacking Junyo. There is still doubt about which section hit which carrier. All three carriers in CarDiv Two were covered. None returned to battle during the war. Hiyo was sunk, and the damaged Junyo and Ryuho were broken up two years after the war in a Japanese shipyard. You will note that other U.S. squadrons registered hits on Carrier Division 2 as well.

I pulled out, easing down to about 300 feet and was immediately taken under fire by all sorts of ships – battleships, cruisers, and destroyers. Cawley yelled into his mike, "Skipper, look back. She's burning from asshole to appetite!" About that time there was so much stuff being thrown up at us that I just couldn't look back. Cawley then began telling me to climb or descend, depending on where the AA was aimed. We pulled out to the eastward. As soon as I was clear of the Japanese outer screen, I started a gentle turn to the left. It was about 1930 and beginning to get dark. I shortly had six of my birds, then three more. Several Zeros were about to make a run on us, but Kane's fighters shot down four or five. After three orbits, I knew that we'd have to start back to the task force. As I gave the hand signal indicating that we were squared away on our return course, we began to pick up all sorts of stragglers. As soon as they picked up our heading they added throttle and left us. They weren't going to get stuck with the SBD's 150-knot cruise speed.

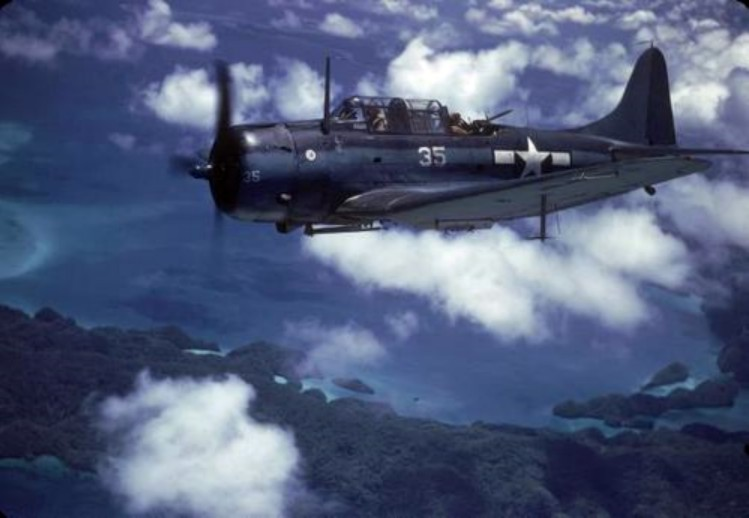
An SBD-5 Dauntless

He was personally credited with crippling a Japanese aircraft carrier, which naval historian Barrett Tillman believes was Ryūhō. Ramage made a slow and deliberate return to Enterprise in order to conserve fuel, but on reaching it found that its deck was obstructed by a crashed aircraft, and he had to land on USS Yorktown instead. Only one Enterprise plane was lost in combat, although five more were lost operationally through accidents, crash landings or ditching at sea. Only one of these was an SBD. For his part in the battle, Ramage was awarded the Navy's second highest honor, the Navy Cross. His citation read:

for extraordinary heroism in operations against the enemy while serving as Pilot of a carrier-based Navy Dive Bomber and Flight Leader in Bombing Squadron Ten (VB-10), attached to the USS Enterprise (CV-6), in action against enemy Japanese forces in the vicinity of the Marianas Islands from 12 to 20 June 1944. An aggressive combat pilot, Lieutenant Commander Ramage led his squadron with consistent skill and daring on numerous bombing missions in the Marianas and, striking repeatedly against strongly defended military objectives, inflicted costly and excessive damage upon the enemy's defenses and ground installations. Acting as air coordinator on 15 and 16 June, he directed brilliant attacks of all squadrons in support of the landings of our ground forces in their initial advance against the enemy. Taking off with three divisions of his squadron on 20 June he led a fierce attack against enemy carriers, personally diving upon a medium-sized carrier and scoring a hit on the stern of the enemy vessel. By his expert airmanship, exceptional daring and courageous initiative, Lieutenant Commander Ramage contributed essentially to the success of our operations in this strategic area, and his great personal valor in the face of grave peril was in keeping with the highest traditions of the United States Naval Service.

The superior performance of the Lexington and Enterprise squadrons that were still equipped with the old SBD compared with those equipped with the new Curtiss SB2C Helldiver caused great concern, and serious consideration was given to going back to the old aircraft. For this tour of duty, in addition to the Navy Cross, Ramage was awarded the Distinguished Flying Cross twice and the Air Medal six times. In September 1944, Ramage received his last wartime assignment, as commanding officer of Bombing Squadron Ninety Eight VB-98, a California-based training unit. He remained with VB-98 until July 1946.

== Post-war ==
After the war, Ramage applied for the first postwar class at the Naval War College. He wrote two theses, one on the possibility of future conflict with the Soviet Union, and the other on nuclear weapons and carrier aviation. This would eventually lead to new prospects, but on graduation Ramage could not obtain another flying assignment, and instead was posted to the escort carrier USS Bairoko as its navigator. In this capacity, he participated in Operation Sandstone at Enewetak Atoll in April and May 1948. In July, he was assigned to COMNAVAIRPAC as a personnel officer.

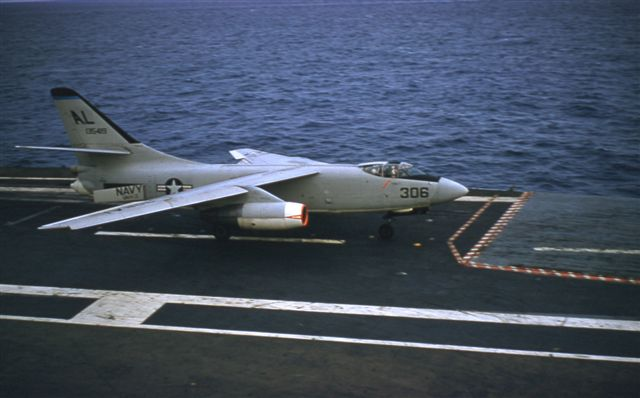
An A3D-1 of Heavy Attack Squadron 3 (VAH-3) on USS Franklin D. Roosevelt in 1957. VAH-3 became the A3D/A-3 Replacement Air Group (RAG) squadron for the Atlantic Fleet in 1958.

In March 1950, Ramage went to Sandia Base, where he attended an indoctrination course on nuclear weapons. In June was assigned to the Armed Forces Special Weapons Project (AFSWP), and was promoted to commander in July. While waiting for his Q clearance, he was put in charge of a board investigating a crash of an AJ Savage, then the Navy's frontline nuclear bomber, an aircraft that did not impress Ramage. After his clearance came through, he worked in the AFSWP's Operations Division, writing and reviewing war plans.

After becoming jet qualified in F9F Panthers at the Fleet Air Gunnery Unit (FAGU), Ramage assumed command of Carrier Air Group 19 in December 1952. His squadrons carrier qualified on USS Yorktown in June 1953 before embarking on USS Oriskany. The ship sailed for Korea, where a ceasefire had been in effect since July 1953. Alan Shepard flew as his wing man. At the end of this cruise in June 1954, he assumed command of VC-3, a large composite squadron that acted as a transitional training unit at Naval Air Station Miramar in California. He became chief of the Sea Base Striking Forces Planning Unit (OP-05W) in the Office of the Chief of Naval Operations in Washington, DC in June 1955, and then entered the National War College in July 1957, where he was promoted to captain on 1 August. Once again he produced a dissertation on nuclear weapons.

On graduating a year later, Ramage once again expressed a preference for a flying job, so he received command of Heavy Attack Wing One, which was based at Naval Air Station Sanford, Florida. This wing consisted of the nuclear attack squadrons flying the A3D Skywarrior, detachments from which were posted to the aircraft carriers. The post was a senior one for a captain; Robert Goldthwaite had held the post while he was a rear admiral. Ramage had never flown the A3D before, so he started by becoming carrier qualified on it, which required eight carrier landings. To his surprise, he found that the aircraft was easy to fly, and he was successful at lifting the training level of the entire wing.

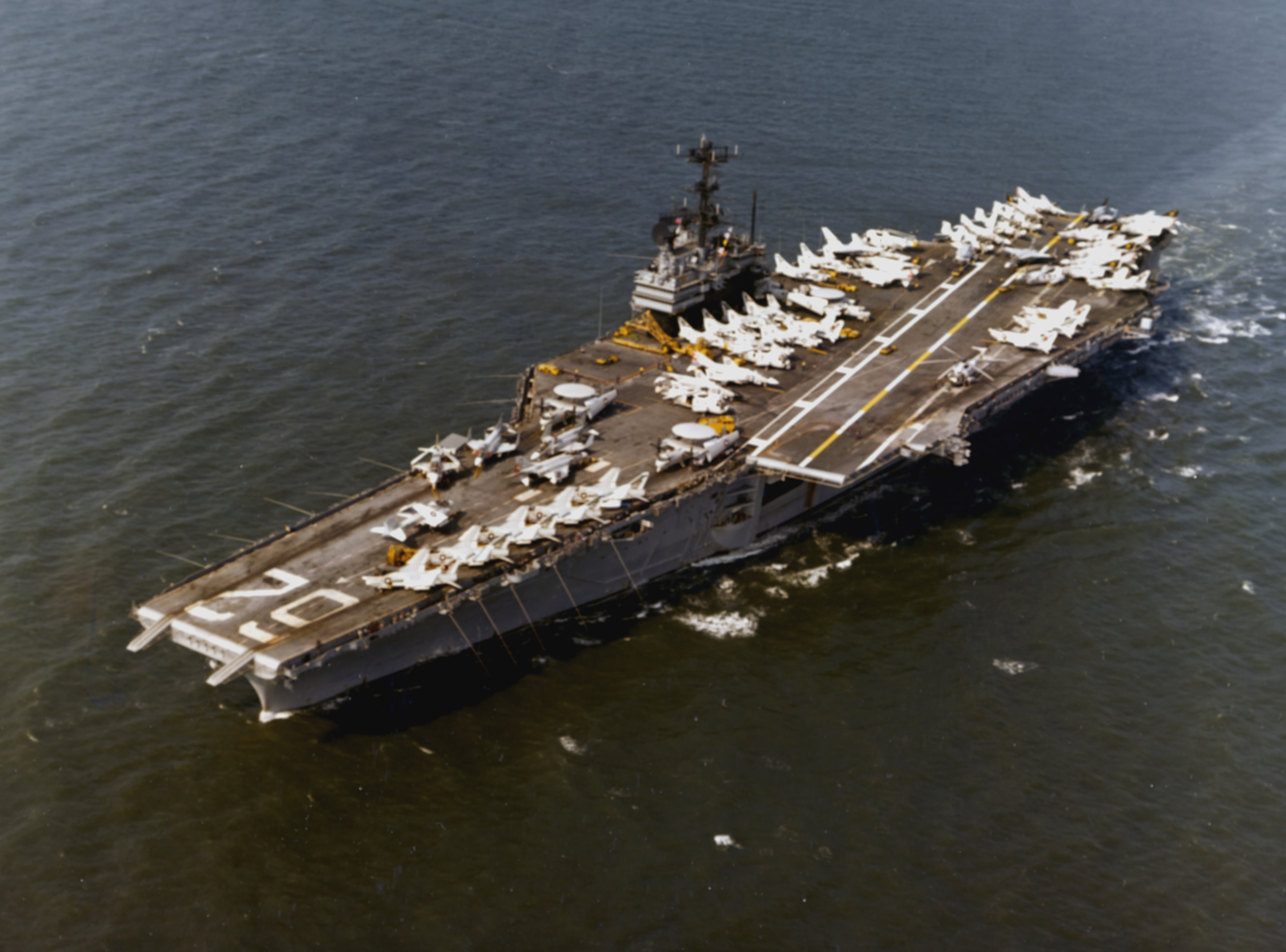
USS Independence, circa the 1970s

Still too junior to be considered for command of an aircraft carrier, he received command of a seaplane tender, USS Salisbury Sound. He then returned to the Office of the Chief of Naval Operations as head of Special Weapons Plans (OP-604) in July 1961. He was awarded a Master of Arts degree from George Washington University in 1963. In July 1963, he received command of an aircraft carrier, the USS Independence. Despite having limited experience with ships, Ramage had no trouble adjusting to commanding one. He never felt though, that commanding a ship was an enjoyable as flying an aircraft. The ship won the Arleigh Burke award for most improved crew. Around this time, his marriage broke up, and he became divorced. He was remarried in Rome on 14 August 1964, to Virginia (Ginger) Keesling Cordes. She had two children, Randy and Karen Cordes.

Returning to shore duty in Washington, he was assigned to Joint Task Force 2, which was charged by Secretary of Defense Robert McNamara with investigating whether it was necessary to have aircraft that could fly at low altitude at supersonic speeds. This was the subject of considerable debate between the Navy and the Air Force at the time. Tests were carried out at Sandia Base with the OV-1 Mohawk, A-1 Skyraider, A-4 Skyhawk, A-6 Intruder, F-4 Phantom, F-105 Thunderchief, B-52 and B-58 Hustler aircraft.

In January 1966, he became chief of staff of Carrier Division Seven, which was commanded by Rear Admiral James R. Reedy, flying his flag from the aircraft carrier USS Kitty Hawk. This formed part of Task Force 77, which was cruising off the North Vietnamese coast at Yankee Station during the Vietnam War. North Vietnam was divided into Route Packages, which allotted certain areas to the Navy, and Ramage's role was to coordinate the Navy's part in Operation Rolling Thunder. For this he was awarded the Legion of Merit. He also spent a brief time as commander of the aircraft carrier USS Franklin D. Roosevelt after its skipper had a heart attack.

Ramage was promoted to rear admiral on 1 July 1967. As a flag officer, he became Commander Fleet Air NAS Whidbey Island, another training command, this time specializing on the A-6 Intruder. His tenure was short, for in April he was assigned to the staff of the Commander-in-Chief, U.S. Pacific Command (CINCPAC), Admiral U. S. Grant Sharp Jr., which was responsible for the overall direction of the war in Vietnam. For his service at CINCPAC, Ramage was awarded the Navy Distinguished Service Medal. In 1970, he assumed command of Carrier Division Seven, which was still off the coast of Vietnam. For this, he was awarded a second and third Legion of Merit.

In April 1972, Ramage became Commander Naval Air Reserve, based at Naval Air Station Glenview in Illinois, for which he received a fourth Legion of Merit. His final assignment was as Commander Tenth Naval District, Caribbean Sea Frontier and Commander Fleet Air Caribbean from 12 June 1973 to 23 August 1975. He retired from active duty in January 1976.

== Later life ==
Ramage was a member of the Carrier Aviation Hall of Fame, and in 2006, was inducted into the American Combat Airman Hall of Fame in Midland, Texas. In May 2008 he was inducted into the Naval Aviation Hall of Honor at the National Naval Aviation Museum at NAS Pensacola, Florida. He was involved in the ultimately successful campaign to rename Waterloo's ConWay Civic Center as the Five Sullivan Brothers Convention Center, in honor of the Sullivan brothers, five brothers from Waterloo who died when USS Juneau was lost during World War II. In 2008, Ramage appeared in The History Channel series Battle 360 and recounted many of his experiences as a member of VB-10.

On 21 July 2012, he died at his Coronado, California, home of congenital heart failure, and was buried at Fort Rosecrans National Cemetery in San Diego. He was survived by his daughters Jamie and Jaleen, and his step daughter Karen. He had four grandchildren and four great grandchildren. A scholarship was established by the Tailhook Educational Foundation in his honor.

== Jig Dog Ramage Award ==
In 2001, the Tailhook Association established the annual "Jig Dog" Ramage Award to recognize the air wing-aircraft carrier team with the best performance as an integrated unit and excellence in Navy carrier operations.

Jig Dog Ramage Award
Year	Ship	Wing	Reference
2001	USS George Washington	CVW-17	
2002	USS Carl Vinson	CVW-11	
2003	USS Abraham Lincoln	CVW-14	
2004	USS Harry S. Truman|	CVW-3	
2005	USS Harry S. Truman	CVW-3	
2006	USS Theodore Roosevelt	CVW-3	
2007	USS Dwight D. Eisenhower	CVW-7	
2009	USS Dwight D. Eisenhower	CVW-7	
2010	USS Dwight D. Eisenhower	CVW-7	
2011	USS George H.W. Bush	CVW-8	
2012	USS John C. Stennis	CVW-9	
2014	USS George H.W. Bush	CVW-8	
2015	USS Theodore Roosevelt	CVW-1	
2016	USS Harry S. Truman	CVW-7	
