= Miniverse =

- Genre: Documentary
- Directed by: Douglas Cohen; Louis C. Tarantino
- Narrated by: Chris Hadfield
- Country of origin: United States
- Original language: English
- No. of episodes: 1

Production
- Executive producer: Douglas Cohen
- Producer: Sven Berkemeier
- Cinematography: Tom Collins
- Running time: 50 minutes
- Production companies: CuriosityStream; Flight 33 Productions

Original release
- Network: CuriosityStream
- Release: 17 April – 17 April 2017

Miniverse is a documentary film that was released on the subscription video on demand service CuriosityStream, in partnership with production company Flight 33 Productions. Miniverse is hosted by former International Space Station Commander Colonel Chris Hadfield. The concept of the film is to bring the expanse of the Solar System down to the scale of the continental United States. In the film, Hadfield drives on a cross-country journey exploring planets and celestial bodies with a rotating passenger seat of famous astronomers, traveling from New York to California. The film premiered on April 17, 2017.

Graphics and scenes from Miniverse place the sun over Long Island, Mars over New York's Freedom Tower, and Jupiter over the Lincoln Memorial in Washington, DC. Later, Hadfield guides his car through an asteroid belt at high speed. Miniverse supporting cast features theoretical physicist Dr. Michio Kaku, as well as chief astronomer and director of the Fels Planetarium at Philadelphia's Franklin Institute, Dr. Derrick Pitts, and Dr. Laura Danly, curator at the Griffith Observatory in Los Angeles.

== Media coverage ==
- Space.com
- The Huffington Post
- Yahoo! News
- Universe Today
- Toronto Star
- Astronomy (magazine)
