= One Day University =

American adult education program

One Day University is an adult education program founded by Steven Schragis and John Galvin in 2006. The program's one-day sessions feature four or five lectures by leading American university professors. Originally based in the New York City area, the program has spread to Boston, Philadelphia, Washington, Florida and California. It hosts events at leading colleges including Villanova, Georgetown University, Notre Dame, Babson and the College of Saint Elizabeth.

The school's faculty include Pulitzer Prize winners Jack Rakove and Gordon Wood, Bard College president Leon Botstein, social critic Andrew Delbanco, Clinton White House advisor Christine Heenan, Holocaust historian Jonathan Steinberg, philosopher Tamar Gendler, psychologist Paul Bloom, and legal scholar Akhil Reed Amar.

In 2009, One Day University was acquired by Bill Zanker and The Learning Annex to bring the live One Day University experience online for students around the world.

One Day University held its largest event to date on Sunday, October 4, 2009 at the Hilton Hotel in New York City. 5,000 students from around the country attended One Day U to learn from 17 professors from notable universities, along with keynote speaker and Harvard professor Alan Dershowitz. One year later, on October 3, 2010, 4,000 students returned to the Hilton in New York for another event. Faculty on that day included former New York State Governor Mario Cuomo and award-winning writer and Princeton professor Joyce Carol Oates. Hollywood legend and UCLA professor Peter Guber taught at the March 13, 2011 event in New York City.

In 2011, One Day University was reacquired by original founder Steven Schragis and a group of investors.

In May 2021, the company was acquired by CuriosityStream, a subscription streaming video service focused on factual content. One Day University will continue to operate separately.
