= Lac-Sainte-Thérèse =

- Dispersed Rural Community
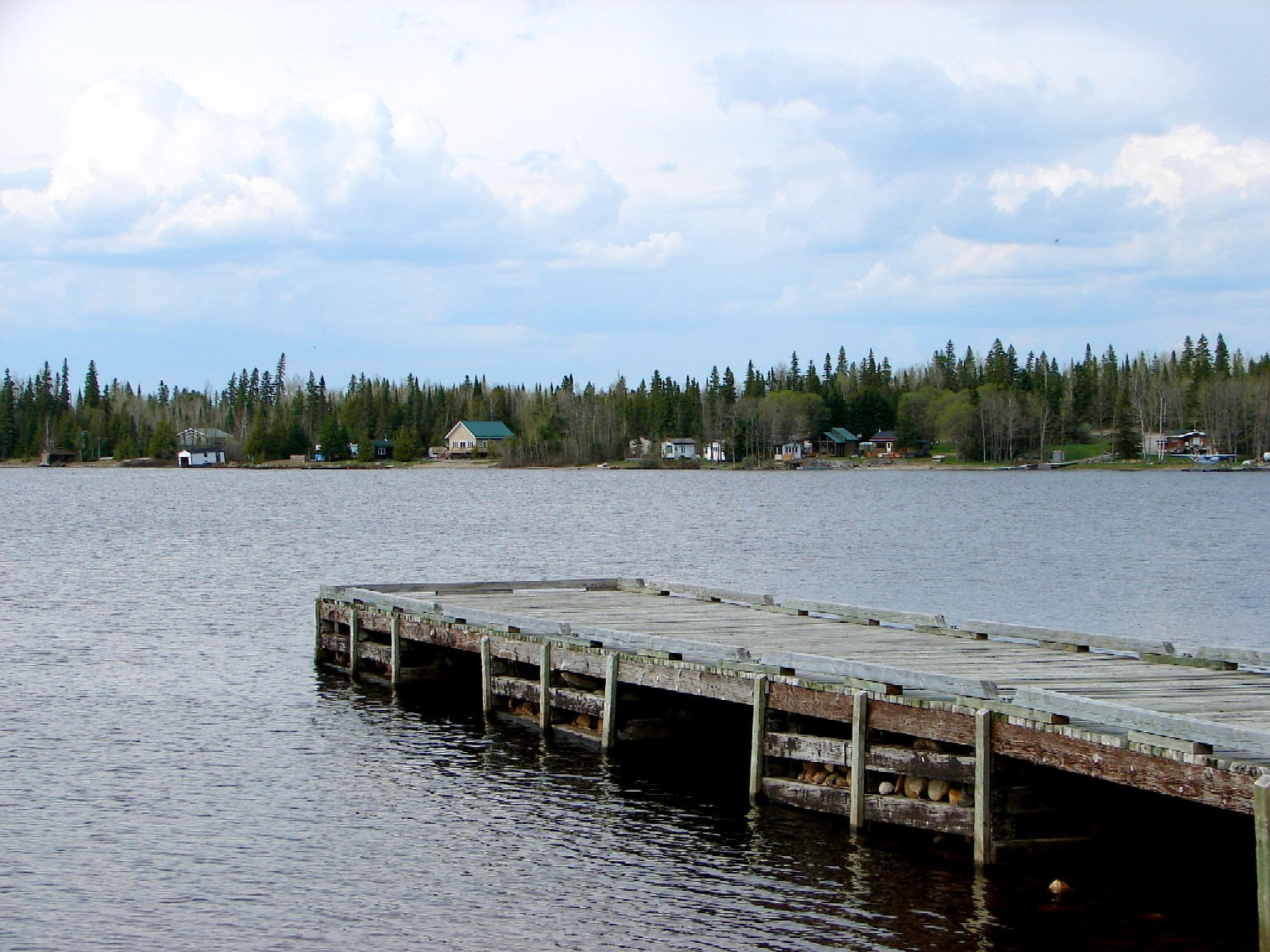

- Location in Ontario
- Coordinates: 49°47′28″N 83°38′58″W
- Country: Canada
- Province: Ontario
- District: Cochrane
- Geographic Township: Casgrain
- Elevation: 240 m (790 ft)
- Time zone: UTC-5 (Eastern Time Zone)
  - Summer (DST): UTC-4 (Eastern Time Zone)
- Postal Code: P0L 1N0
- Area codes: 705, 249

Lac-Sainte-Thérèse is a dispersed rural community in geographic Casgrain Township, Cochrane District in Northeastern Ontario, Canada. The community is counted as part of Unorganized Cochrane North Part in Canadian census data.

== Location ==
The community is located at the northern terminus of Ontario Highway 583 approximately 12 kilometres (7.5 mi) north of Hearst. It is on the eponymous Lac Ste. Thérèse (lake) and Ste.-Thérèse Creek, which flow via the Pivabiska River, Missinaibi River and Moose River to James Bay.

== Noted people ==
- Doric Germain, Franco-Ontarian writer and professor, was born in Lac-Sainte-Thérèse.
