= Lac Ste. Thérèse =

Lac Ste-Thérèse
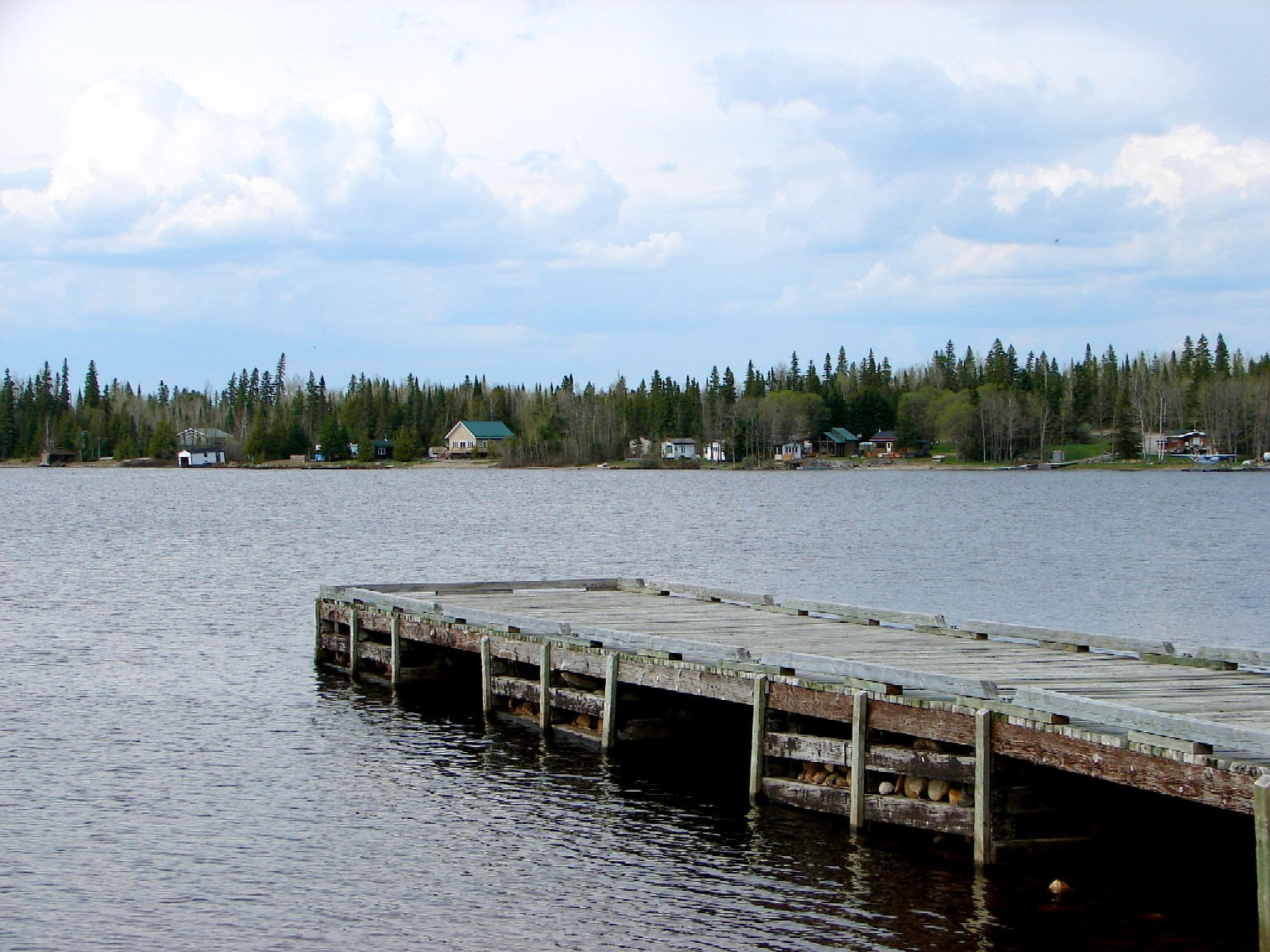

- Location in Ontario
- Location: Cochrane District, Ontario
- Coordinates: 49°47′56″N 83°39′05″W
- Type: Lake
- Part of: Moose River drainage basin
- Primary inflows: Ste.-Thérèse Creek
- Primary outflows: Pivabiska Narrows
- Basin countries: Canada
- Max. length: 1.5 kilometres (0.93 mi)
- Max. width: .75 kilometres (0.47 mi)
- Surface elevation: 236 metres (774 ft)
- Settlements: Lac-Sainte-Thérèse

Lac Ste. Thérèse is a lake in geographic Casgrain Township, Cochrane District in Northeastern Ontario, Canada. It is in the Moose River drainage basin, and is located at the northern terminus of Ontario Highway 583 at the community of Lac-Sainte-Thérèse.

The primary inflow, at the southwest, is Ste.-Thérèse Creek. The primary outflow, at the northeast, is the Pivabiska Narrows, which flows via Lac Pivabiska, the Pivabiska River, the Missinaibi River and the Moose River to James Bay.

== Tributaries ==
- Ste.-Thérèse Creek

== See also ==
- List of lakes in Ontario
