= Stephen Hawking's Favorite Places =

2016 documentary series

- Official show poster
- Genre: Documentary
- Directed by: Ed Watkins
- Presented by: Stephen Hawking
- Composer: Sheridan Tongue
- Country of origin: United States
- Original language: English
- No. of episodes: 3

Production
- Executive producers: Noah Morowitz, Ben Bowie
- Producer: Ed Watkins
- Running time: 27 minutes
- Production companies: Curiosity Stream; Bigger Bang

Original release
- Network: Curiosity Stream
- Release: 22 September – 22 September 2016

Related
- Stephen Hawking's Universe

Stephen Hawking's Favorite Places is an original documentary series that was released exclusively on Curiosity Stream, in partnership with production company Bigger Bang. Stephen Hawking stars in and narrates the series, in which he pilots a Computer-generated imagery (CGI) space ship (the SS Hawking) across the Universe, making stops at some of his favorite places and discussing the scientific significance of each location.

On October 5, 2017, the series won the News & Documentary Emmy Award for Outstanding Graphic Design & Art Direction, in a category with its peers from Smithsonian Channel, Discovery Channel, PBS and Vox.

== Synopsis ==
Episode 1 takes Hawking from black holes to the Big Bang, Saturn to Santa Barbara, California.

Episode 2 finds Hawking in search of the theory of everything. He also discusses the Great Filter solution to the Fermi paradox and the dangers of artificial intelligence in a visit to Proxima Centauri b.

Episode 3 continues Hawking's fears regarding AI, as well as his search for a theory of everything. He also introduces the multiverse concept and the anthropic principle.

== Release ==
The series had a planned release date of April 19, 2018. However, with Hawking's death on March 14, 2018, CuriosityStream released the third episode early, temporarily making all three episodes free to stream on their website as a tribute to Hawking.

== Awards and nominations ==
News & Documentary Emmy Award

- Outstanding Graphic Design & Art Direction (Winner, 2017)

== Media coverage ==
- International Business Times
- GeekWire
