= Fontaine's Landing =

- Unincorporated area
- Location in Ontario
- Coordinates: 49°48′40″N 83°46′10″W
- Country: Canada
- Province: Ontario
- District: Cochrane
- Geographic Township: Hanlan
- Elevation: 237 m (778 ft)
- Time zone: UTC-5 (Eastern Time Zone)
  - Summer (DST): UTC-4 (Eastern Time Zone)
- Postal Code: P0L 1N0
- Area codes: 705, 249

Fontaine's Landing is an unincorporated area in geographic Hanlan Township, Cochrane District in Northeastern Ontario, Canada. The community is counted as part of Unorganized Cochrane North Part in Canadian census data, and is located at the southwest corner of Wolverine Lake where the Valentine River enters the lake, about 15 kilometres (9.3 mi) northwest of Hearst.
