= Amazing Dinoworld =

Streaming mini-docuseries

- Genre: Documentary
- Narrated by: Salvatore Vecchio
- Composers: Hideaki Kimura Evan Call
- Countries of origin: Japan and United States
- Original language: English
- No. of episodes: 4

Production
- Executive producers: Yasuhiro Adachi; Ken Matsuo
- Running time: 48–52 minutes
- Production companies: NHK; CuriosityStream; Autentic

Original release
- Network: CuriosityStream

Amazing Dinoworld is a 2019 streaming mini-docuseries produced by NHK in co-production with CuriosityStream and Autentic. The first two seasons lasted two episodes each, both covering prehistoric creatures.

== Background and production ==
CuriosityStream partnered with NHK to develop three series of which Amazing Dinoworld was the first.

Amazing Dinoworld is a paleontology-related series and features digital renderings of dinosaurs. While CuriosityStream drove the storytelling of the series, NHK worked on the series' visual art. Salvatorre Vecchio is the narrator for the series.

In "The Feather Revolution", the first episode of the series, the Deinocheirus and Troodon of the Mesozoic Era are focused on. The second episode deals with the Mosasaurus and an early land-dwelling reptilian ancestor, Protomosasaurus.

== Release and streaming ==
CuriosityStream developed two episodes for the first season, "The Feather Revolution" and "The World of Sea Monsters"; the platform premiered the series on October 17, 2019. The series was also made available on HBO Max at its launch on May 27, 2020. A second season, called Amazing Dinoworld 2 consists of two episodes, "Survivors: A New Theory" and "The Kingdom of Supersizers" and was released on CuriosityStream on November 30, 2023.

== Episodes ==
=== Season 1 ===
No.	Title	Directed by	Original release date
1	"The Feather Revolution"	Kazuki Ueda; Yasuke Matsufune	October 17, 2019
The concept of feathered dinosaurs is explored, contrary to the previously long-held belief that dinosaurs were more reptile-like. The Deinocheirus and Troodon are of particular focus. The Halszkaraptor is also discussed.
2	"The World of Sea Monsters"	Kazuki Ueda; Yasuke Matsufune	October 17, 2019
Prehistoric ocean life is discussed, with the Mosasaurus and Protomosasaurus being particularly focused on.

=== Season 2 ===
No.	Title	Directed by	Original release date
1	"Survivors: A New Theory"	Unknown	November 30, 2023
2	"The Kingdom of Supersizers"	Unknown	November 30, 2023

== Reception ==
In a review of the CuriosityStream platform, PCMag listed Amazing Dinoworld as one of its notable series.
