= RelieF =

Canadian television series

- Presented by: Gisèle Quenneville
- Country of origin: Canada

Original release
- Network: TFO

Relief, formerly known as Panorama, was a public affairs newsmagazine series in Canada, airing nightly in Ontario on TFO, the Franco-Ontarian public television channel.

The series was hosted by Gisèle Quenneville. Associated reports include Melanie Routhier-Boudreau, Isabelle Brunet, Marie Duchesneau, Luce Gauthier, Frédéric Projean and Chantal Racine. Longtime host Pierre Granger retired in 2009. The series was renamed RelieF in autumn 2010.

RelieF aired seven nights a week at 7 p.m. From Monday to Thursday, it focused on news and public affairs. On Fridays, it showed documentaries. Saturday had a "week in review" edition and Sunday an arts and culture magazine.
