= Curiosity Stream =

American video streaming service

- Curiosity Stream's logo used since April 2020
- Website type: OTT platform
- Available in: 3 languages
- List of languages: English; German; Spanish
- Traded as: Nasdaq: CURI
- Headquarters: Silver Spring, Maryland, US
- Country of origin: United States
- Area served: Worldwide
- Industry: Documentary; mass media
- Products: Streaming television; video on demand; digital distribution
- Services: Film production; film distribution; television production; television distribution
- Revenue: ▲US$39.6 million (2020)
- Parent: Curiosity Stream Inc.
- Website: curiositystream.com
- Commercial: Yes
- Registration: Limited free titles. Subscription required to access full library
- Users: ▲20 million (as of August 10, 2021)
- Launched: March 18, 2015; 11 years ago
- Current status: Active

Curiosity Stream, formerly branded as CuriosityStream, is an American subscription video on-demand over-the-top streaming television service. The service primarily offers documentary programming including films, series, and TV shows.

Launched in 2015 by the founder of the Discovery Channel, John S. Hendricks. As of 2021, it was reported to have approximately 20 million subscribers worldwide across its direct and bundled platforms. Curiosity Stream produces original documentaries and series including Royals: Keeping the Crown, The History of Home, Miniverse, Stephen Hawking's Favorite Places, David Attenborough's Light on Earth, Deep Time History, and additionally features content from the BBC, NHK, and other producers.

== History ==
John Hendricks, who founded Discovery in 1982, started Curiosity Stream as a stand-alone OTT media service in March 2015 with his daughter, Elizabeth Hendricks, as CEO. The service expanded distribution to Amazon Channels and in 2017, had its first distribution deal with a multichannel video programming distributor (MVPD) when it became available on Comcast's set-top box VOD platform and the MSO's Xfinity Stream app/portal. In April 2018, Dish Network made Curiosity Stream available on internet-connected Hopper devices and the Dish Anywhere mobile app.

In June 2018, Clint Stinchcomb was appointed president and CEO of the company, after first joining Curiosity Stream in 2017 as chief distribution officer. He is also the co-founder and former CEO of Poker Central. Previously Stinchcomb held positions as managing director of Worldwide Media Group (WMG) and executive vice president and general manager of Discovery Communications' Emerging Television Networks.

In July 2020, Curiosity Stream signed a partnership deal with Swedish telecommunications Com Hem to bring the company's library content to Sweden. Many of the programs were made available with Swedish subtitles. In August 2020, Matthew Blank joined Curiosity Stream's board of directors. Blank had formerly spent over 20 years as the chairman and CEO of Showtime Networks where he had overseen television series including Homeland, Dexter, and Billions. On October 15, 2020, Curiosity Stream became the first publicly traded streaming media company focused on factual content when it started trading on NASDAQ under the ticker symbol "CURI". The public trading was a result of a reverse merger with Software Acquisition Group, Inc., a special-purpose acquisition company.

In November 2020, Indian pay-TV and OTT provider Tata Sky partnered with the company to bring its content to Tata Sky's subscribers via binge+. The programs were made available to Tata Sky DTH customers as a linear channel. In May 2021, the company acquired One Day University, an adult education platform which features lectures from university and college professors. In July 2021, Curiosity Stream partnered with German TV channel Spiegel TV to offer a linear channel in Germany, Austria, and Switzerland. In August 2021, the company acquired Now You Know Media, parent of Learn25.

In August 2021, the company announced a rebranding including the shortened name for its parent company, Curiosity, which is composed of Curiosity Stream (streaming service), Curiosity Channel (linear channels), and Curiosity Studios (originals production). The streaming service was also retitled from CuriosityStream to Curiosity Stream.

Curiosity bought a minority share in Nebula in 2021, valuing Nebula at over $50 million. A bundle subscription for both services was available from 2021 to 2023, which boosted the growth of both. Nebula became unbundled from Curiosity Stream's plans beginning 2024, though one year of access would still be provided to subscribers that renewed by the end of 2023. Before a price increase in 2022, the service was offered at $19.99 per year for the standard annual subscription. As of May 2023, the standard annual subscription was $39.99. On February 6, 2024, Curiosity Channel was dropped by the streaming service Frndly TV. Frndly TV had carried the channel since 2020.

== Programs ==
The service offers on-demand content and linear, live TV-style streams from its VoD catalog. Programs cover factual content including science, history, mathematics, technology, robotics, and nature. It offers content for children and original programming, along with a Kids Mode option to filter out inappropriate content. In June 2020, Curiosity Stream signed a partnership with wildlife production company Doclights to add 50 original nature documentaries to SVOD and pay TV platforms. Programs include Cheetah: Beating the Odds; Hidden Australia, These Birds Were Made for Walking; Jaguar: King of the Jungle; Magical Fjords, Meet the Meerkats, Meet the Marsupials; Puma: The Ghost Cat; and Sloth Bear: Birth of A Prince.

In November 2020, the company announced a new series, Beyond the Spotlight, from executive producers Leonardo DiCaprio and Stephen David. Each episode features conversations with celebrity icons, focused on their personal lives, histories, and inspirations. Celebrities include Samuel L. Jackson and his wife LaTanya Richardson Jackson, Kristen Bell, Shaquille O'Neal, Joe Namath, and MrBeast. The first episodes premiered on November 19, 2020. In December 2020, the company announced an original series focusing on primatologist Jane Goodall called Rescued Chimpanzees of the Congo with Jane Goodall. The series was produced by Curiosity Stream, Off the Fence Productions, and the Jane Goodall Institute. It premiered on July 14, 2021. It includes three decades of unseen archival footage.

On June 10, 2021, Doug to the Rescue, a six-part docuseries premiered. The series follows Doug Thron, an aerial cinematographer, who uses technology including drones, infrared cameras, spotlights, and high intensity zoom lenses to find and rescue animals in the wake of natural disasters around the world. In September 2021, the company released its first original feature-length film, Heval, which is about the life of Michael Enright who volunteered to fight ISIL.

Additional available programs on Curiosity Stream include David Attenborough's Light on Earth and Ant Mountain, Dream the Future, Empire of Tsars, Out of the Cradle; The Spying Game: Tales from the Cold War; The Normans, Heston's Dinner in Space, and The Secret World of Lego. Content for children includes Quarx, Prehistoric Worlds and Ocean Mysteries with Jeff Corwin.

Docuseries
Title	Genre	Release date	Seasons/episodes
Deep Time History	Docuseries	July 22, 2016	3 episodes
Stephen Hawking's Favorite Places	Docuseries	September 22, 2016	3 episodes
Amazing Dinoworld	Docuseries	October 17, 2019	2 episodes
4th & Forever: Muck City	Docuseries	May 14, 2020	1 season, 8 episodes
The History of Home, narrated by Nick Offerman	Docuseries	June 18, 2020	3 episodes
Beyond the Spotlight	Docuseries	November 19, 2020	1 season, 6 episodes
Rescued Chimpanzees of the Congo with Jane Goodall	Docuseries	July 14, 2021	1 season, 5 episodes
Royals: Keeping the Crown	Docuseries	October 21, 2021	1 season, 6 episodes

Documentaries

Title	Genre	Release date	Seasons/episodes
David Attenborough's Light on Earth	Documentary	May 29, 2016	One-off (1 episode)
Miniverse	Documentary	April 17, 2017	One-off (1 episode)
Heval	Documentary	September 23, 2021	One-off (1 episode)
Going Circular	Documentary	November 4, 2021	One-off (1 episode)

== Viewership and partners ==
In August 2021, the company had approximately 20 million subscribers across 175 countries. In 2019, Curiosity Stream was translating its programs into Russian, Serbian, Spanish, Portuguese, Mandarin, and Cantonese. Curiosity Stream offers annual and month-to-month subscriptions and a 4K plan. It distributes its programming in the U.S. and internationally using a mix of OTT players, pay-TV operators, and broadband ISPs. The app is available through Roku, Apple TV Channels and Apple TV, Android TV, Xbox One, Xbox Series X/S, Amazon Fire TV, Sprint, Google Chromecast, iOS and Android, Amazon Prime Video Channels, YouTube TV, Sling TV, Comcast Xfinity on Demand, LG TV webOS, and PlayStation 4. All programs are available in either HD or 4K.

The service has over 50 partners including Amazon, Comcast, Netflix, Optimum Communications (USA); Com Hem (Sweden); StarHub (Singapore); Totalplay (Mexico); Multichoice's DStv (Africa); Millicom (Latin America); Okko (Russia); Gazprom-Media (Russia); Liberty Global/FLOW (the Caribbean); and Tata Sky (India).

== Awards and nominations ==
News & Documentary Emmy Award

- Secrets of the Solar System - Outstanding Science and Technology Documentary (Nominee, 2021)
- Stephen Hawking's Favorite Places - Outstanding Graphic Design & Art Direction (Winner, 2017)
- David Attenborough's Light on Earth - Outstanding Nature Documentary (Nominee, 2017)
- David Attenborough's Light on Earth - Outstanding Cinematography: Documentary (Nominee, 2017)

Jackson Hole Wildlife Film Festival

- David Attenborough's Light on Earth - Best Host/Presenter-Led Film (Winner, 2017)
- David Attenborough's Light on Earth - Best Science in Nature Film (Nominee, 2017)
- Big World in a Small Garden - Best Short Film (Nominee, 2017)

Webby Award

- Curiosity Stream - Best Science & Education Channel (Honoree, 2017)
- Deep Time History - Best Documentary Series (Honoree, 2017)
- Science Breakthroughs: Gravitational Waves - Science & Education for Film & Video (Nominee, 2017)
- Curiosity Stream - Best Science & Education Channel (Honoree, 2016)

British Academy Film Awards (BAFTA)

- David Attenborough's Light on Earth - Specialist Factual (Nominee, 2017)
