= Navajo Rangers =

Law enforcement agency in the Southwestern United States

Agency overview
- Formed: 1957

Jurisdictional structure
- Operations jurisdiction: Navajo Nation
- Governing body: Division of Natural Resources (Navajo Nation)

Operational structure
- Headquarters: Window Rock, Arizona
- Sworn members: 11(2020)
- Agency executive: Hope Wilson (2012), Program Manager

The Navajo Rangers (formed 1957) is an organization of the Navajo Nation in the Southwestern United States, which maintains and protects the tribal nation's public works, natural resources, natural and historical sites and assist travelers. The Rangers form part of the Navajo Nation Department of Resource Enforcement (within the Division of Natural Resources). The agency currently consists of 11 officers in four different field locations. The organization was founded by Richard Fowler Van Valkenburgh.

== Founder ==
"No white man has ever worked among us with greater devotion and understanding." Navajo Tribal Council Resolution, August 6, 1957

Richard Fowler Van Valkenburgh founded the Navajo Rangers in 1957. Valkenburgh (a non-native man) was born in Newark, Alameda County, California. He graduated from Compton Union High School in California and then began working with Standard Oil and Richfield Oil Companies between 1923 and 1928. He soon after began work in Archaeology as a student assistant in the Los Angeles Museum of History, Art and Science. Valkenburgh developed a strong interest in the Indians of Southern California and Arizona during his archaeological research in these areas. Richard started research in Navajo archaeology and ethnology in 1934. In 1938 he wrote A Short History of the Navajo People, and in wrote many other articles for western magazines over the years. More than forty of his articles were published in Desert Magazine. Most important to Richard, in the course of his life, was his work for and with the Navajo people. Valkenburgh was employed by the Bureau of Indian Affairs to oversee research on land problems, but then resigned in 1942. In 1951, he returned to the reservation to work on Navajo land claims for the Tribal Council. He was Chief of the Land Use and Surveys Section of the Navajo Tribe, and did a great deal to establish proof of the historical occupancy rights of the Hopi and Navajo Indians from earliest times. Richard was also involved in many other projects benefiting the Navajo Nation. He analyzed boundary line disputes, was influential in the Governmental decision to add lands to the Navajo Reservation, aided in preserving historic records and files of the Navajo Tribe, and brought about the establishment of a Navajo Park Commission for preservation of Navajo antiquities. Richard died of a heart attack on June 19, 1957. He is buried in the Navajo Cemetery at Fort Defiance, in an honored place next to the late leader of the Navajos, Chee Dodge.

== Mission statement ==
"To protect and preserve the cultural, historical and archaeological resources of the Navajo Nation, through law enforcement, public education, preventive patrols, and regulatory enforcement. To safeguard and preserve the livestock property of residents to maintain the cultural and traditional significance of this resource for future generations of Diné."

== Duties ==
The Navajo Rangers are responsible for many different areas of enforcement and protection. Some of these areas of responsibility include but are not limited to cultural resources, forestry, parks and scenic areas, fish and game, back country patrol, all-terrain vehicle patrol, search and rescue, technical rescue, boat operations, mud flood snow emergencies, and wild land fire investigation and response. They are also responsible for many livestock inspections. They administer both annual and seasonal permits for rodeo stock as well as seasonal permits for 4-H, inspect livestock for resale and assist in the reading of brands for many new livestock owners.

In addition to these seemingly normal, day to day tasks the rangers have also been involved in a surprisingly large number of paranormal investigations. Although these paranormal cases account for less than one percent of cases retired ranger, John Dover, still considers them to be a significant part of their job. All of their officers are trained at the federal law enforcement training center and are recognized by the federal government as federal officers. Even with their extensive training nothing prepared them for some of the strange paranormal cases that they investigate. Dover, along with his partner, Stan Milford, have come across reports of several different instance of paranormal activity and sightings such as ghosts, UFOs, Bigfoot and even creatures in Navajo folklore like skinwalkers (witches that can shape-shift into animals).

== Requirements for hiring ==
Requirements to be a Navajo Ranger are similar to that of any other job in law enforcement. Applicants must be U.S. citizens, twenty-one years of age prior to their graduation from the academy, a high school graduate or G.E.D equivalent, be both physically and mentally healthy, and have no felony convictions, misdemeanor convictions within the past three years, domestic violence convictions, excessive traffic citations or have been dishonorably discharged from any United States Armed force. Applicants must also submit many different copies of identification such as a valid state driver's license, a notarized copy of Certificate of Indian Blood and copies of their high school or G.E.D. certificate.
