= Lac Pivabiska =

- Location in Ontario
- Location: Cochrane District, Ontario
- Coordinates: 49°48′47″N 83°42′25″W
- Type: Lake
- Part of: James Bay drainage basin
- Primary inflows: Valentine River, Pivabiska Narrows
- Primary outflows: Pivabiska River
- Basin countries: Canada
- Max. length: 6.8 kilometres (4.2 mi)
- Max. width: 4.2 kilometres (2.6 mi)
- Surface elevation: 235 metres (771 ft)
- Settlements: Marina Veilleux

Lac Pivabiska is a lake in Cochrane District in Northeastern Ontario, Canada. It is in the James Bay drainage basin and is the source of the Pivabiska River. It is officially known by the French name only.

The primary inflows are the Valentine River, arriving from Wolverine Lake, at the west; and the Pivabiska Narrows, arriving from Lac Ste. Thérèse, at the east. The primary outflow, at the northeast, is the Pivabiska River, which flows via the Missinaibi River and the Moose River to James Bay.

== Tributaries ==
- Pivabiska Narrows
- Valentine River

== See also ==
- List of lakes in Ontario
