= Pivabiska River =

- Location of the mouth of the Pivabiska River in Ontario

Location
- Country: Canada
- Province: Ontario
- Region: Northeastern Ontario
- District: Cochrane

Physical characteristics
- Source: Lac Pivabiska
  - location: Casgrain Township
  - coordinates: 49°50′24″N 83°40′07″W
  - elevation: 235 m (771 ft)
- Mouth: Missinaibi River
  - location: Garden Township
  - coordinates: 50°13′10″N 82°52′21″W
  - elevation: 90 m (300 ft)

Basin features
- River system: James Bay drainage basin

The Pivabiska River is a river in Cochrane District in Northeastern Ontario, Canada. It is in the James Bay drainage basin and is a left tributary of Missinaibi River.

The river begins at Lac Pivabiska in geographic Casgrain Township and heads north. It turns northeast, then east, enters geographic Garden Township and immediately thereafter reaches its mouth at the Missinaibi River. The Missinaibi River flows via the Moose River to James Bay.

== Tributaries ==
- Casgrain Creek (right)
- Lac Pivabiska
  - Valentine River
  - Pivabiska Narrows
    - Lac Ste. Thérèse
      - Ste.-Thérèse Creek

== Sources ==
- Map 14 (PDF) (Map). 1 : 1,600,000. Official road map of Ontario. Ministry of Transportation of Ontario. 2010-01-01.
- Restructured municipalities - Ontario map #3 (Map). Restructuring Maps of Ontario. Ontario Ministry of Municipal Affairs and Housing. 2006.
