= Flight 33 Productions =

American documentary production company

Flight 33 Productions was an American documentary production company founded in 2006 that specialized in programs about history and science. It produced programs for The History Channel, The Discovery Channel, The National Geographic Channel, 3net, H2, The Weather Channel, Spike and Comcast.

== Awards ==
A Distant Shore - 2008 Emmy Award for Outstanding Historical Programming - Long Form

Big History - 2014 Emmy Award for Outstanding Graphic Design and Art Direction

History of the World in 2 Hours - 2011 Emmy Nomination For Outstanding Individual Achievement In Craft: Graphic Design & Art Direction

Life After People - 2008 Emmy Nomination For Outstanding Writing For Nonfiction Programming; 2008 Emmy Nomination For Outstanding Special Visual Effects For A Miniseries, Movie Or Special

Shootout - 2006 Emmy Nomination For Outstanding Individual Achievement In A Craft: Graphic And Artistic Design

Wild West Tech - 2006 Emmy Nomination For Outstanding Individual Achievement In A Craft: Graphic And Artistic Design
