= Au nord de notre vie =

Studio album by CANO
- Released: 1977
- Genre: Progressive rock
- Length: 45:24
- Label: A&M
- Producer: Don Oriolo

CANO chronology
Tous dans l'même bateau (1976)	Au nord de notre vie (1977)	Eclipse (1978)

Au nord de notre vie (In the North of Our Lives) is an album by CANO, released in 1977. It was the band's second album and its last with founding member André Paiement.

The album's centrepiece track was a suite of three poems by writer Robert Dickson, including the poem that gave the album its title.

The 1980 National Film Board documentary, Cano - notes sur une expérience collective, documents the recording of this album and highlights each member in the studio.

== Track listing ==
1. "Che-Zeebe" (3:33) - (Rachel Paiement, Marcel Aymar)
2. "Automne" (4:37) - (Aymar)
3. "À la poursuite du nord (Suite)" (10:55)
  (a) "Au nord de notre vie" - (Robert Dickson, Michel Kendel, A. Paiement, R. Paiement)
  (b) "En mouvement" - (Robert Dickson, J. Doerr, R. Paiement)
  (c) "Viens suivre" - (Dickson, David Burt)
4. "La Première fois" (4:41) - (A. Paiement)
5. "Mon pays" (12:10) - (A. Paiement, Burt, Kendel, John Doerr, Wasyl Kohut)
6. "Frère Jacques" (3:22) - (trad. arr. Burt)
7. "Spirit of the North" (5:59) - (Kohut)

== Personnel ==
- Marcel Aymar - vocals, acoustic guitar, percussion
- David C. Burt - electric guitar, vocals
- Michel Dasti - percussion
- John Doerr - electric bass, synthesizer
- Michel Kendel - piano, synthesizer, vocals
- Wasyl Kohut - violins
- Rachel Paiement - vocals, acoustic guitar, percussion
- André Paiement vocals, acoustic guitar, electric bass, percussion
- Kim Deschamps - dobro
- Monique Paiement - flute, vocals
- Matt Zimbel - percussion
- Alison Reynolds - cello
- Rick Francis - guitar
- Don Oriolo - producer
- Ed Stasium - recording engineer
