= Visible (album) =

Studio album by CANO
- Released: 1985
- Genre: Progressive rock

CANO chronology
Spirit of the North (1980)	Visible (1985)	20th Century Masters: The Best of CANO (2003)

Visible is an album by the Canadian progressive rock band, CANO, released in 1985.

It was the band's final studio album. Marcel Aymar, David Burt, Michel Dasti and Michel Kendell were joined on Visible by Ben Mink replacing Wasyl Kohut, who had died of a brain aneurysm, and Mary Lu Zahalan replacing Rachel Paiement, who had moved to the west coast and married Jim Vallance.

The album was strong and revitalized the band briefly. It included "Fond d'une bouteille", which was the French version of a song recorded on the Camouflage album, and "L'eloueze" which was written in Aymar's native Acadian dialect, and most poignantly "J'ai bien vécu", a tribute to band founder André Paiement, who died by suicide in 1978.

== Track listing ==
1. "Partons"
2. "Pauline"
3. "Au lac du Corbeau noir"
4. "Invisible"
5. "Mets tes gants"
6. "Je rêve de ta lumière"
7. "Fond d’une bouteille"
8. "L’éloueze des concessions"
9. "J’ai bien vécu"

== Personnel ==
CANO:

- Kermit - guest
- Marcel Aymar - vocals
- David C. Burt - electric guitar
- Michel Dasti - drums, percussion
- John Doerr - bass
- Michael Kendel - vocals, keyboards

with:

- Ben Mink - electric violin
- Mary Lu Zahalan - vocals
- Produced by Cano
