= Sures =

Sures is a surname. Notable people with the surname include:

- Ben Sures (born 1967), Canadian musician
- Jack Sures (1934–2018), Canadian ceramic artist
- Jay Sures (born 1966), American entertainment industry executive
