= Rendezvous (CANO album) =

Studio album by CANO
- Released: 1979
- Genre: Progressive rock

CANO chronology
Eclipse (1978)	Rendezvous (1979)	Spirit of the North (1980)

Rendezvous was the fourth album by the Canadian progressive rock band, CANO. Released in 1979, the album was produced by Jim Vallance, who later married CANO singer Rachel Paiement.

Rendezvous was the band's final studio album with most of its original lineup.

On the RPM charts, Rebound reached No. 97 on December 22, 1979.

== Track listing ==
1. "Rebound" (4:31)
2. "Entente" (4:56)
3. "Clown Alley" (3:09)
4. "Sometimes the Blues" (4:36)
5. "Other Highways" (4:42)
6. "L'autobus de la pluie" (5:52)
7. "Floridarity Forever" (3:45)
8. "Mime Artist" (5:50)

== Personnel ==
CANO:

- Marcel Aymar - lead vocals, acoustic guitar
- David C. Burt - electric guitar, acoustic guitar
- Michel Dasti - drums, percussion
- John Doerr - bass, trombone
- Michael Kendel - vocals, piano, keyboards, synthesizer, electric guitar
- Wasyl Kohut - violins
- Rachel Paiement - lead vocals, acoustic guitar

with:

- Bryan Adams - background vocals on "Mime Artist"
- John Anthony Helliwell - saxophone on "Rebound"
- Brian Leonard - percussion on "Entente" and "Sometimes the Blues"
- Monique Paiement - background vocals
- Peter Schenkman - cello
- Matt Zimbel - percussion on all tracks except "Entente" and "Sometimes the Blues"
- Produced by Jim Vallance
- Engineered and mixed by Howard Parrot
