= Notre Place =

Franco-Ontarian national anthem

- anthem of Francophone Ontario
- Also known as: English: Our Place
- Lyrics: Paul Demers, François Dubé
- Music: Paul Demers, François Dubé, 1989

"Notre Place" (English: Our Place) is the official community anthem of the Franco-Ontarian people in the province of Ontario, Canada.

== History ==
The song was originally written by Paul Demers and François Dubé in 1989 to celebrate the coming into effect of the French Language Services Act into Ontario law, guaranteeing government services in the French language across 26 designated regions of the province. The song was recorded by Demers with Robert Paquette and the band Hart-Rouge, and first presented to the public at the Queen Elizabeth Theatre in Toronto, where the Grand Gala organised by the Fondation franco-ontarienne and TFO was taking place.

The song's popularity within the Franco-Ontarian community grew, and it became an important rallying call during the S.O.S. Montfort protests of the late 1990s.

In September 2016, a French-language Catholic primary school in Orléans was opened, being named École élémentaire catholique Notre-Place in honour of the song. In October 2016, the Francophone Assembly of Ontario held a minute of silence after Demers died of lung cancer.

On 2 March 2017, the Legislative Assembly of Ontario passed a bill granting the song official status as the Franco-Ontarian national anthem. The bill had been introduced by Liberal Glengarry-Prescott-Russell MPP Grant Crack, and was unanimously adopted by the Assembly.

In 2018, a monument to francophonie was inaugurated in Queen's Park in front of the Legislative Assembly. The monument was named after the song.

== Songwriting ==
Demers had originally retired from music after a diagnosis of non-Hodgkin's lymphoma in the early 1980s, but came out of retirement to write the song. While writing the song, he was inspired by We Are the World, a charity single originally recorded by the supergroup USA for Africa in 1985, as well as Yves Duteil's La langue de chez nous and Le Cœur de ma vie de Michel Rivard.

One often-cited verse calls "pour mettre les accents là où il le faut" ("to put the accents where they belong"). The verse references the attempts of Franco-Ontarians to have the accent marks of French-language names officially recognised on Ontario, such as in place names (like the city of Orléans) or for surnames on government-issued documents.

== Other versions ==
After Demers' death, TFO released a version of the song sung by Franco-Ontarian musicians from across the province in honour of his memory. In August 2017, DJ UNPIER released a remake of the song, placing the lyrics over a new melody.

== See also ==
- A Place to Stand, a Place to Grow
