= Paul Demers =

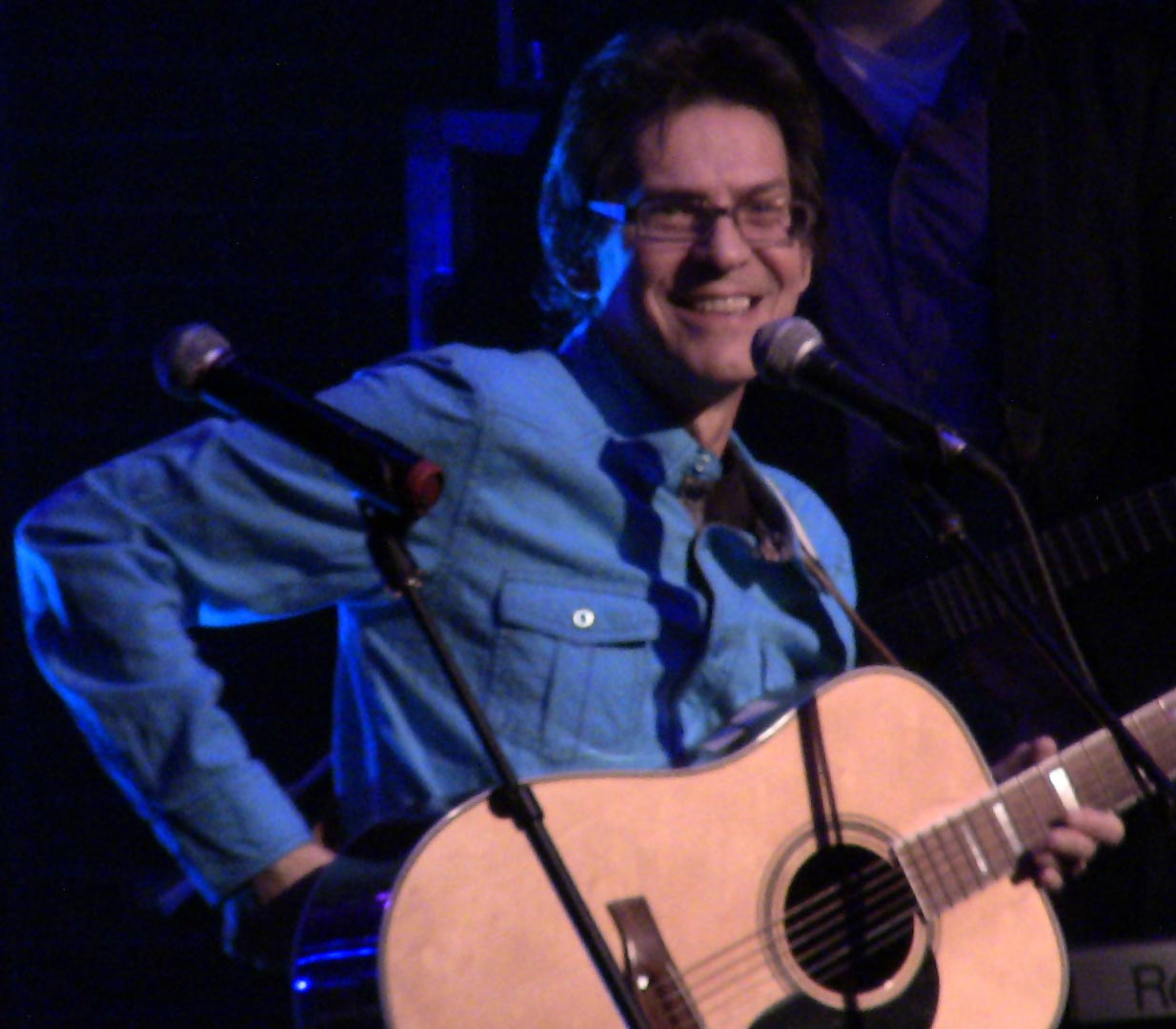
- Paul Demers performing at La Nuit sur l'étang in 2013.

Background information
- Born: March 9, 1956; Gatineau, Quebec
- Died: October 29, 2016 (aged 60) Ottawa, Ontario
- Genres: folk rock
- Occupation: singer-songwriter
- Years active: 1979–2016

Paul Demers (March 9, 1956 – October 29, 2016) was a Canadian singer-songwriter. He was best known for writing the song "Notre Place", which came to be recognized as an anthem of the Franco-Ontarian community.

== Background ==
Born in Gatineau, Quebec, his family moved to Ottawa, Ontario when he was 16. He began performing as a musician in adulthood, touring music festivals across Ontario and forming the band Purlaine in 1979. Following a diagnosis of non-Hodgkin's lymphoma in the early 1980s, however, he took several years off from music to undergo cancer treatment.

== "Notre place" ==
He came out of retirement in 1986 to write the lyrics to "Notre place", which was originally commissioned for a gala to celebrate the passage of Ontario's 1986 French Language Services Act. The song came to be adopted as the Franco-Ontarian community's unofficial anthem, and was formally designated as the community's official anthem by the Legislative Assembly of Ontario in 2017.

Following "Notre place", Demers returned to touring, both as a solo artist and with musicians Robert Paquette and Marcel Aymar in the group Paquette-Aymar-Demers, released three albums, and worked as a theatre producer and director. A biography of him, by writer Pierre Albert, was published by Éditions Interligne in 1992.

== Death ==
Demers was diagnosed with mesothelioma in January 2016. He gave a retrospective interview from his hospital bed to the Ici Radio-Canada Première program Grands Lacs Café in the fall, prior to his death on October 29.

== Discography ==
- Paul Demers (1990)
- D’hier à toujours (1999)
- Encore une fois (2011)
