= Northern Lights Festival Boréal =

Annual summer music festival in Sudbury, Ontario, Canada

Coordinates: 46.47661°N 80.99211°W

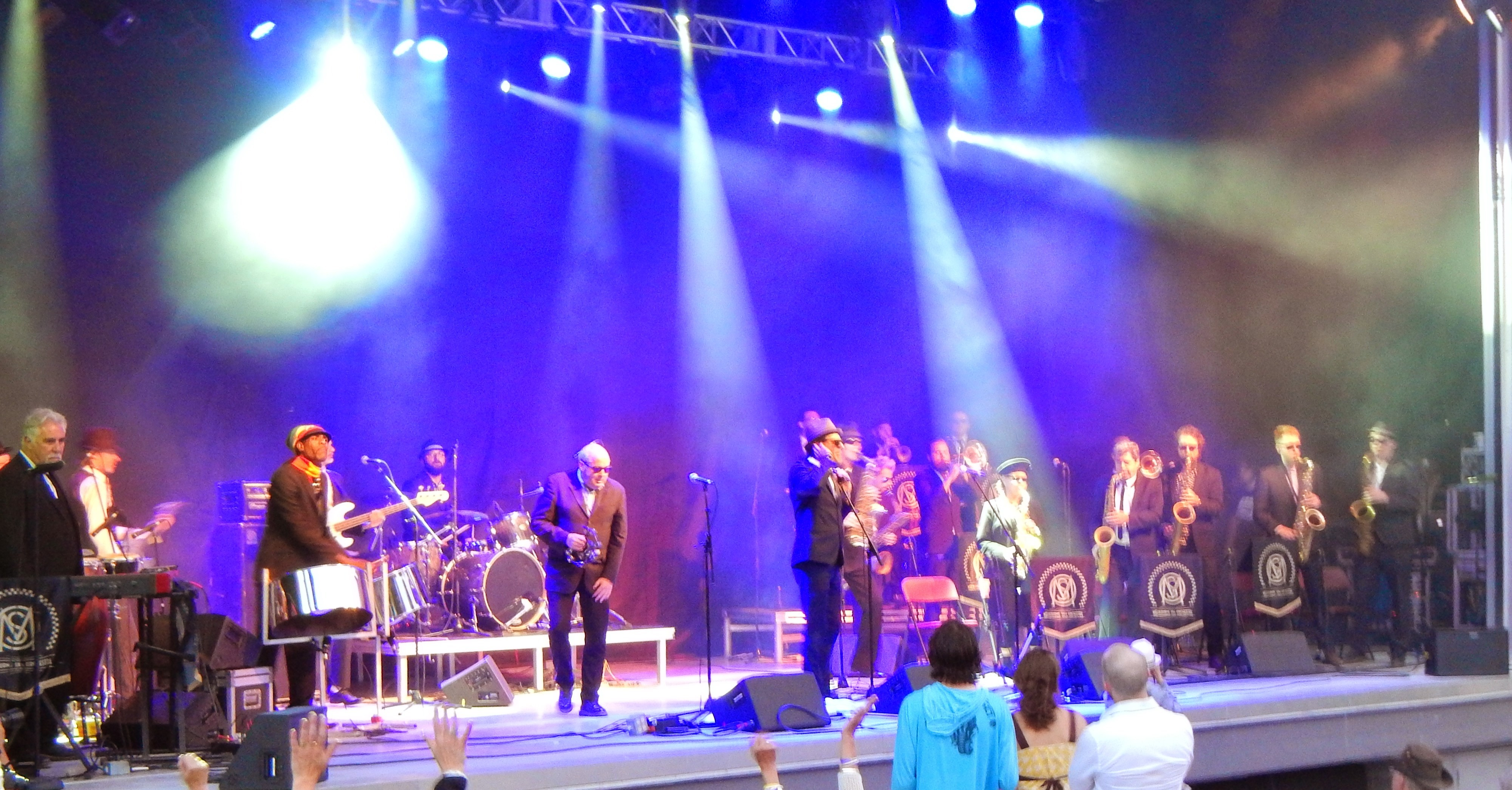
- Melbourne Ska Orchestra performing at Northern Lights Festival Boréal in 2014
- Genre: Folk, rock, roots music, jazz, blues, Indigenous music
- Locations: Sudbury, Ontario, Canada
- Years active: 1972–present
- Website: Northern Lights Festival Boréal

Northern Lights Festival Boréal is an annual summer music festival in Sudbury, Ontario. One of Canada's oldest continuous music festivals, it has been staged every year since 1972 including during the COVID-19 pandemic.

The bilingual festival is held on the shores of Ramsey Lake at Bell Park, home of the Grace Hartman Amphitheatre. A diverse program of music is presented in a variety of genres including arts, crafts and children's entertainment. Northern Ontario, national, and international artists and performers are featured. in concert performances as well as collaborative workshops.

In addition to the summer festival, the organizing committee sponsors concerts and other cultural events in Sudbury throughout the year.

The festival is normally held over three days in the first weekend of July, although occasionally it has also taken place over one, two or four days.

== History ==
Founded by a group of volunteers in 1972, the festival incorporated in 1975 at which time artists also began to be paid for performing. The event has always been multicultural, including Ukrainian, Indian, and Croatian Canadians at the first festival, and Indigenous artists since the third.

Some of the highlights over the years:

- In the 1970s, Colin Linden, then 14 years old, appeared at the festival.
- Canadian folk musician Stan Rogers wrote one of his most famous songs, "Barrett's Privateers", while at the festival. The song was written for a collaborative performance session with the band Friends of Fiddler's Green.
- In 1976, the festival was one of the first major venues to book Shania Twain, then 10 years old.
- In 1988, the event was postponed to the last weekend of July to serve as the cultural festival for the 1988 World Junior Championships in Athletics, which were held in the city.
- The 1990 event saw the first collaborative performance by folk musicians James Keelaghan and Oscar Lopez, who later recorded two Juno Award-nominated albums together as the Compadres.
- In 1992, the festival was profiled in the TVOntario series Putting On the Arts.
- In 1999, pop singer Amanda Marshall announced a concert in the city on a date that conflicted with the festival. The controversy was resolved when Marshall's promoters offered a special promotional pass that enabled ticketholders to attend both events. Nevertheless, attendance at the festival fell below expectations, leaving a deficit. The following year, the festival recovered by offering a smaller program.
- In 2017, the festival expanded its three-day schedule with a Thursday night performance devoted exclusively to Indigenous music.
- In 2020-21, the traditional festival was cancelled due to the COVID-19 pandemic in Canada. In its place, a drive-in music concert was held in 2020, and a limited, smaller event in 2021.
- The festival celebrated its 50th anniversary in 2022.

Festival artistic directors have included Scott Merrifield, Vickie McGauley, John Closs, Claude Faucon, Paul Loewenberg, and Max Merrifield.

== Awards ==
The Jackie Washington Award is presented each year for distinguished contribution to Northern Ontario's cultural life. Past recipients have included Robert Paquette, Ken Whiteley, Daniel Bédard, Paul Dunn and Charlie Angus. The co-winners of the award in 2024 were Iona Reed and Ron Kelly. In 2025, local blues musician Tom Fyfe won the award. The award is named for Jackie Washington, a blues musician who appeared at the festival 25 times between the festival's inauguration in 1972 and Washington's death in 2009.

The Bernie Melanson Volunteer Award is also awarded annually, named after one of the festival's founding members and given to individuals or groups for longstanding or exceptional service to the festival.

== Performers ==
=== 1980 ===
CANO, Tom Rush, Stan Rogers

=== 1983 ===
Scott Merritt, Lauri Conger and Lorraine Segato, The Nylons, The Bop Cats, Joe Hall, Nancy White, Eritage, Shirley Eikhard, Richard Séguin, Robert Paquette, CANO, Paul Dunn, Daisy DeBolt, Jacko Chartrand

=== 1990 ===
James Keelaghan, Oscar Lopez, Tom Paxton, Josephine, Loreena McKennitt

=== 1995 ===
Ashley MacIsaac, Kashtin, Nadjiwan, The Wailing Aztecs, The Shuffle Demons, Stephen Fearing, Eric Nagler

=== 1997 ===
Blue Rodeo, Bob Wiseman, Universal Honey, Change of Heart, The Pursuit of Happiness, Bob Snider, Fred Eaglesmith, Pacande, The Wailing Aztecs, Nadjiwan, Les Chaizes Muzikales

=== 1998 ===
Bruce Cockburn, Natalie MacMaster, Rheostatics

=== 1999 ===
Mackeel, Buckwheat Zydeco, Grievous Angels, Kim Stockwood

=== 2000 ===
The Arrogant Worms, Rita Chiarelli, The Corndogs, Alun Piggins, Carlos del Junco, Konflit Dramatik, Ruby Craig, The Rockin' Highliners, Debbie Danbrook, Hank Engel and the Hoosier Daddies, No Reservations, Darlene

=== 2004 ===
The Arrogant Worms, BeeBop Cowboys, Broche à Foin, Kevin Closs, Sarah Craig, Véronic DiCaire, Brian Dunn, Fred Eaglesmith, Grievous Angels, The Havocs, Colin James, Kingpins, Konflit Dramatik, Corb Lund, Kate Maki, Matapat, Mondo Idols, Ox, Pilate, Andy Stochansky, Sweetwater, The Wailin' Jennys, Verge

=== 2007 ===
Ron Sexsmith, Leahy, Blackie and the Rodeo Kings, Peter Case, Les Breastfeeders, Oh Susanna, Peter Elkas, Ox, Kim Barlow, Torngat

=== 2008 ===
Kate Maki, Old Man Luedecke, Nathan Lawr, Two Hours Traffic, Daniel Bélanger, Ian Tamblyn, David Francey, Miracle Fortress, The Sadies, Don McLean

=== 2009 ===
Serena Ryder, Bob Wiseman, Joel Plaskett, Jenn Grant, Bob Snider, Angie Nussey, Stéphane Paquette, J. P. Cormier, Norman Foote, Mr. Something Something

=== 2011 ===
Broken Social Scene, The Weakerthans, Lunch At Allen's, Ron Hynes, J. P. Cormier, Ladies of the Canyon

=== 2012 ===
Daniel Lanois, Steven Page, Joel Plaskett, The Good Lovelies, The Hidden Cameras

=== 2013 ===
Serena Ryder, Kathleen Edwards, Buck 65, Lynn Miles, Caracol, Elisapie, Swamperella, Cindy Cook

=== 2014 ===
Amélie, Annie Lou, Bustamento, Bruce Cockburn, Lemon Bucket Orkestra, Melbourne Ska Orchestra, Barry Miles, Stéphane Paquette, Red Moon Road, Crystal Shawanda, The Strumbellas, Tokyo Police Club, Wintersleep

=== 2015 ===
Fanny Bloom, Big Tobacco & The Pickers, Billy John & The Irish Wake, The Bombadils, Duncan Cameron, Cello Tales, J. P. Cormier, Quique Escamilla, Five Alarm Funk, Sarah Harmer, Hello Holiday, House of David Gang, Jayme Stone's Lomax Project, Kobo Town, Lee Harvey Osmond, Dan Mangan, Melbourne Ska Orchestra, Mimi O'Bonsawin, Lisa Marie Naponse, Le Paysagiste, Pistol George Warren, Les Poules à Colin, Adonis Puentes, Reuben and the Dark, Scarlett Jane, Ben Sures, Tuba Boy, The Wild Geese

=== 2016 ===
Afrikelektro, The Amazing René, Bahamas, Mélanie Brulée, Collective Roots, Cindy Cook, Digging Roots, Brian Dunn, Paul Dunn, Fagroongala, Martine Fortin, Matt Foy, Anique Granger, Gypsy Kumbia Orchestra, Jennifer Holub, Les Hotêsses d’Hilaire, Hugh Jazz, François Lemieux, A. David MacKinnon, Natalie MacMaster and Donnell Leahy, Kate Maki, Mandala, Minotaurs, Murder Murder, Orkestar Kriminal, Steven Page, Pretty Archie, Chuck Roberts, Sheesham & Lotus & Son, Frederick Squire, Jeff Stewart and Community Drums, Rose-Erin Stokes, Sun K, Dwayne Trudeau, Josh Turnbull, Union Duke

=== 2017 ===
Aerialists, The Ape-ettes, Barry Miles and the Congregation, Bboy Redsky, Bixiga 70, Black Bull Moose Singers, La Bronze, Christian Cirelli, Dr. Tom's Travelling Medicine Show, M. D. Dunn, Ever-Lovin' Jug Band, Les Frérots Rochers, Stephanie Fyfe, Emmanuel Gasser, Louis-Philippe Gingras, Sarah King Gold, Nico Glaude, Joy Harjo, Hidden Roots Collective, The Jerry Cans, Jonathan Byrd and the Pickup Cowboys, Bryden Gwiss Kiwenzie, Mclean, Miss Sassoeur & Les Sassys, Mob Bounce, Music by Jake, No Reservations, Fred Penner, Dale Pepin, Plugged Nickel String Band, Quantum Tangle, Rabbit and Bear Paws, Jenny Ritter, Don Ross, Buffy Sainte-Marie, Samantha Martin and Delta Sugar, Andy Shauf, Nick Sherman, Ansley Simpson, Rae Spoon, Shotgun Jimmie, Annie Sumi, Leonard Sumner, Chris Thériault, Trad, A Tribe Called Red, Tuns, The Turbans, Whitehorse, Clayton Windatt, Yukon Blonde

=== 2018 ===
Afrikana Soul Sister, Afro Madness Drum Troupe, Alvvays, Andrew Queen and the Campfire Crew, Arkells, C.R. Avery, Les Barricades, BBBRTHR, Seth Bernard, Binaeshee-Quae, Black Bull Moose Singers, Bonsa, Aleksi Campagne, Canailles, Casper Skulls, David Cordero, Aron d'Alesio, Russell deCarle, Les Deuxluxes, Cécile Doo-Kingué, Matt Foy, Frank Deresti and the Lake Effect, Fresh Kils & Vekked, Jane's Party, Connie Kaldor, Doctor Nativo, Guitars Alive Quartet, Hellnback, Richard Inman, Iskwé, JoPo and the Rize, Julie and the Wrong Guys, King Abid, Kira May, The Keyframes, Édouard Landry, Abigail Lapell, Lisa Leblanc, Lee Harvey Osmond, Paul Loewenberg and Richard Mende, Pat Maloney, Mama's Broke, Rodney Meilleur, Mickey O'Brien, Murder Murder, NiLLa & Ghettosocks, Orlando Julius and Afrosoundz, Joel Plaskett and Bill Plaskett, Donné Roberts, Shadowy Men on a Shadowy Planet, Sheesham & Lotus & Son, Sulfur City, Team T&J, Mara Tremblay, Laetitia Zonzambé

=== 2019 ===
The Almighty Rhombus, Bedouin Soundclash, Boogat, Kevin Breit, Brooke Bruce, Basia Bulat, The Burning Hell, Duncan Cameron, Eric Clancy, Kevin Closs, Jean-Paul De Roover, Cris Derksen, Fred Eaglesmith and Tif Ginn, ECHLO, Nick Ferrio, Eva Foote, Half Moon Run, Haviah Mighty, Jennifer Holub, Jane's Party, Jennis, K'naan, Mélissa Laveaux, Céleste Lévis, Magoo, Mayhemingways, Rodney Meilleur, Hannah Shira Naiman, Safia Nolin, Oh Geronimo, Pop Mach!ne, William Prince, Rayannah, Sam Roberts, Shaky Stars, Sheesham & Lotus & Son, Al Simmons, Ansley Simpson, Leanne Betasamosake Simpson, Ben Sures, Trapment, David Dino White, Jojo Worthington, Zeus

=== 2020 ===
Serena Ryder, Hawksley Workman, Julian Taylor, Maxwell José, Martine Fortin

=== 2021 ===
Dan Mangan, Jeremey Dutcher, Tanika Charles, Okan, Reney Ray, Frank Deresti, The Lake Effect, Dany Laj and The Looks, Cindy Doire

=== 2022 ===
a l l i e, Amandine et Rosalie, Balaklava Blues, Begonia, Bombino, Born Ruffians, Bryden Gwiss Kiwenzie, Casper Skulls, Cassidy Houston, Celeigh Cardinal, Clay and Friends, David Laronde, Gurpreet Chana, Harvey King & The Grindstone, Hezekiah Procter & The Hash House Serenaders, Ian Tamblyn, Judy Collins, Julie Katrinette, Lemon Bucket Orkestra, Lex Leosis, Leyla McCalla, Lillian Allen, Myka 9, Paul Collins’ Beat, Rabbit & Bear Paws, Robert Paquette, Sharon & Randi, Spencer Burton, St. Paul & The Broken Bones, The New Pornographers, Wax Mannequin, Zal Sissokho

=== 2023 ===
Ammoye, Tafari Anthony, Tessa Balaz, Les Bilinguish Boys, Cabiners, Mehdi Cayenne, The Cloves, Dubgee, Paul Dunn and David Lickley, Fembots, The Fitzgeralds, Angelique Francis, Teilhard Frost, G. R. Gritt, Heatstroke, Jeidei, Kalàscima feat. Andrea Ramolo, King Cardiac, Sam Klassik, Korea Town Acid, Léona, Let's Talk Science, Little Fingers Music, Kate Maki, Rodney Meilleur, Mountain City Four, Laura Niquay, Paji and Nyama Nyama Sound, Stéphane Paquette, Pop Machine, Zachary Richard, Richard Inman and the Western Canadian All-Stars, Tasheena Sarazin, Tom Savage, Sheesham & Lotus and Son, Sloan, The Soul Motivators, Spice Islands, Lloyd Spiegel, Steve and the Royal Motel, Jeff Stewart, Strumbellas, Adrian Sutherland, TEKE::TEKE, Blaine Thornton, Valdy, Martha Wainwright, Willow Switch, Zap Mama, Brock Zeman

=== 2024 ===
2VPlus, The 555, Chanelle Albert and the Easy Company, Tim Baker, Johnny Bizness, Jully Black, Boogat, John-Paul Chalykoff and Baabii, Ricardo Chavez, The Cicadas, DJ Shub, Jamie Dupuis, Elephantshoes, Empty House, Evangeline Gentle, James Gray, Housewife, The Human Rights, Andrew Hyatt, July Talk, Kazdoura, Land Heart Song, Edouard Landry, Zachary Lucky, Mattmac, Lynn Miles, Moskitto Bar, Evalyn Parry, Dayv Poulin, Andrew Queen and the Campfire Crew, Chuck Roberts, The Rural Alberta Advantage, Sarah Jane Scouten, Shred Kelly, Tell It to Sweeney, Jacinthe Trudeau and Jeff Wiseman, Willows

=== 2025 ===
Rich Aucoin, Bad Actors, Black Bull Moose Singers, Burnstick, La Déferlance, Destroyer, Eadsé, Cheikh Ibra Fam, Fateh Doe, Jamie Fine, David Francey, Fresh Kils, Glitter Glue, The Honest Heart Collective, Ice Tha One, Jeff Stewart's Spirit of World Drumming, Jordan and the 45, Maxwell José, Lights, Colin Linden, Lotus Wight, Low Animal, Kate Maki, Melbourne Ska Orchestra, Barry Miles, Minor Gold, Mistaken for Wayne, Klô Pelgag, Kat Pereira, Rabbit and Bear Paws, Sarah Craig Quartet, Shad, La Sra. Tomasa, Morgan Toney, Waahli, The Weather Station, Whiskey River Blues Band

=== 2026 ===
2V+ with the Sudbury Symphony Orchestra, Duane Andrews & The Hot Club of Conception Bay, Begonia, The Bobby Tenderloin Universe, Jim Bryson, Bye Parula, Cayenne, Clerel, Charlotte Cornfield, JD Crosstown, Denise De'ion, Foxwarren, Sarah Harmer, Hendrika, Koziithegoat, Terra Lightfoot, Dan Mangan, Arny Margret, Mattmac, Kelly McMichael, Nikki D & The Sisters of Thunder, Okavango African Orchestra, Jessica Pearson & The East Wind, Mark Petersen, Petunia & The Vipers, Lennie Rayen, Aske Skat, Arielle Soucy, Logan Staats, Supalung, Tommyphyll, Andrina Turenne, Merrick Winter

== See also ==
- Historic rock festivals
- Music festivals in Canada
