= Denis St-Jules =

Canadian writer and broadcaster (1950–2024)

Denis St-Jules (March 12, 1950 – February 26, 2024) was a Canadian writer and broadcaster, most noted as a key builder of Franco-Ontarian cultural institutions.

== Background ==
Born and raised in Sault Ste. Marie, Ontario, he moved to Sudbury in the late 1960s to attend Laurentian University. While there he became associated with the Coopérative des artistes du Nouvel-Ontario, an arts collective that played an important role in developing new Franco-Ontarian cultural institutions in the early 1970s.

== Career ==
With collaborators including André Paiement, Gaston Tremblay and Robert Paquette, he was one of the creators of Moé, j'viens du nord, 'stie!, a stage musical about Franco-Ontarian life and identity in Northern Ontario which led to the creation of the Théâtre du Nouvel-Ontario. In 1973, he played a key role in the establishment of La Nuit sur l'étang, a Franco-Ontarian music festival, and was one of four poets whose work was anthologized in Lignes Signes, the first book ever published by the Prise de parole publishing house.

In 1978, when the Radio-Canada network established CBON-FM in the city, St-Jules joined the station from its inception, spending much of that time as an on-air radio host until his retirement in 2008. After his retirement he moved to Ottawa to be closer to his children and grandchildren, but regularly returned to Sudbury to participate in and support cultural events and organizations.

He was awarded an honorary doctorate from the University of Sudbury in 2010.

== Death ==
He died in Ottawa on February 26, 2024.

He was posthumously awarded the Prix du Nouvel-Ontario for his contributions to Northern Ontario life and culture, with the award presented to his widow, Carmen Vincent, in a ceremony at Sudbury's Place des Arts on May 4, 2024.
