= Closs =

Closs is a surname. Notable people with the surname include:

- Jayme Closs, (born 2005), American kidnapping victim
- Keith Closs, (born 1976), American basketball center
- Kevin Closs, (born 1963), Canadian singer-songwriter
- Maurice Closs, (born 1971), Argentine politician
- William Closs, (1922–2011), American basketball forward-center
