= Fernand Dorais =

Canadian writer, Jesuit priest and academic

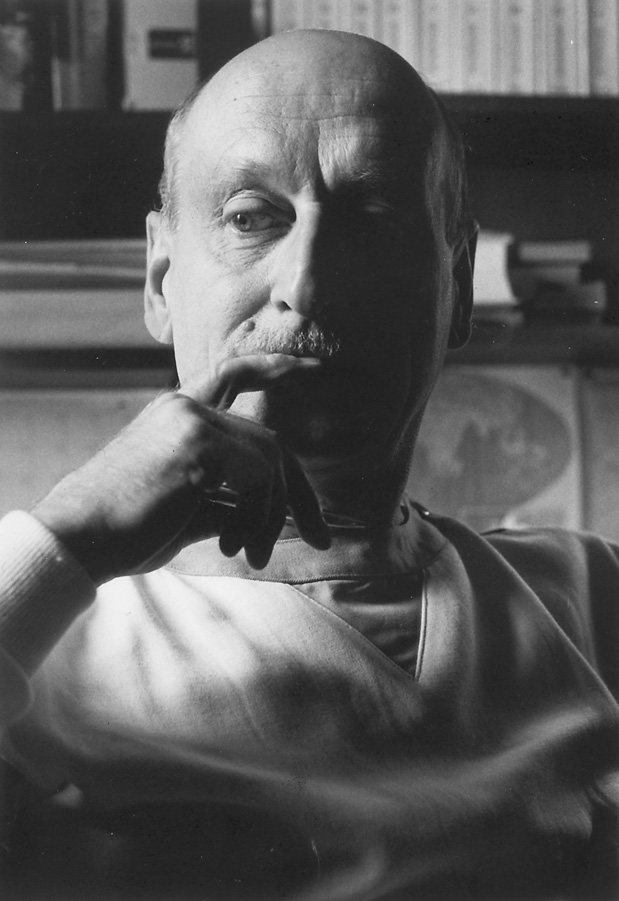
- Born: March 8, 1928; Saint-Jean-sur-Richelieu, Quebec, Canada
- Died: January 16, 2003 (aged 74); Saint-Jérôme, Quebec, Canada
- Occupations: Writer, academic
- Writing career
- Pen name: Tristan Lafleur
- Genres: non-fiction, erotica
- Subjects: Franco-Ontarian cultural identity and literature
- Notable works: Entre Montréal ...et Sudbury, Témoins d'errances en Ontario français, Hermaphrodismes

Fernand Dorais (March 8, 1928 – January 16, 2003) was a Canadian writer, Jesuit priest and academic. A professor of French literature and translation at Laurentian University in Sudbury, Ontario from 1969 to 1993, he was noted for his work as a key builder of Franco-Ontarian cultural identity, through both his academic research and his role in the development of many of the Franco-Ontarian community's contemporary cultural institutions.

Born in Saint-Jean-sur-Richelieu, Quebec, Dorais was educated at the Université de Montréal, Columbia University and the Sorbonne. He taught at Collège Sainte-Marie de Montréal and Collège Lionel-Groulx in Saint-Jérôme in the 1950s and 1960s before moving to Sudbury to join the faculty at Laurentian University.

== Career ==
At Laurentian, he became the first major academic at any Canadian university to advocate for the study of Franco-Ontarian literature as a subject in its own right, rather than as a minor footnote to Quebec literature. He also served as a mentor to the Coopérative des artistes du Nouvel-Ontario, a group of Laurentian University art students who would go on to play a transformative role in Franco-Ontarian culture in the 1970s through creative projects such as the Théâtre du Nouvel-Ontario theatre company, the La Galerie du Nouvel-Ontario art gallery, the La Nuit sur l'étang music festival and the progressive rock band CANO.

Dorais published several works of academic literature during his lifetime, including Entre Montréal… et Sudbury : pré-textes pour une francophonie ontarienne and Témoins d'errances en Ontario français : réflexions venues de l'amer. He also published some fiction work, most notably Hermaphrodismes, a collection of two erotic novellas – one from each of a heterosexual and gay perspective – which he published under the pseudonym "Tristan Lafleur" as the first fiction title ever released by the Prise de parole publishing house. The book caused a minor scandal, and was withdrawn from publication in 1978 after Dorais bought out all the remaining copies of the book and burned them.

Following his retirement from Laurentian University in 1993, Dorais returned to Saint-Jérôme, Quebec, where he died in 2003. Following his death, many of his published and unpublished writings were repackaged by Prise de parole as Le recueil de Dorais, a three-volume set. The first book, Volume I – Les essais, collected his non-fiction writings; the second, Volume II – Trois contes d'androgynie, was a reissue of Hermaphrodismes along with a never before published third erotic fiction story; the third, Volume III – Mémoire d'un religieux québécois, 1928–1944, collected his autobiographical writings and included the first published acknowledgement that Dorais self-identified as a gay man.

== Works ==
- 1963: Mon babel
- 1970: Un temps des poètes a-temporel. À propos d'un livre de Gilles Marcotte: Le temps des poètes
- 1975: Hermaphrodismes (as Tristan Lafleur)
- 1984: Entre Montréal ...et Sudbury, Pré-textes pour une francophonie ontarienne
- 1990: Témoins d'errances en Ontario français : réflexions venues de l'amer
- 2011: Le recueil de Dorais, volume 1 – Les essais, textes réunis et présentés par Gaston Tremblay
- 2012: Le recueil de Dorais, volume 2 – Les trois contes d'androgynie
- 2016: Le recueil de Dorais, volume 3 – Mémoire d'un religieux québécois, 1928–1944
