= Konflit =

Canadian musical group

Konflit, formerly Konflit Dramatik, are a Canadian rap rock band, most prominent in the 2000s. One of the most prominent Franco-Ontarian musical groups of their era, the band had a varying lineup over its lifetime with vocalist Christian Berthiaume as the only constant member.

They were originally formed in 1998 in Sudbury, Ontario, by Berthiaume and guitarist Édouard Landry, for the purpose of competing in the La Brunante music competition. They were finalists in the competition, but did not win; following the competition, the other original band members left while Berthiaume and Landry continued with David (Dayv) Poulin (guitar), Guy Coutu (bass), and Alain Tremblay (drums) of Les Chaizes Muzikales. They performed at Sudbury's Northern Lights Festival Boréal in 1998 and 2000, and at La Nuit sur l'étang in 2000 and 2001, before releasing their debut EP Hors d'œuvre dresse la table in 2001. The album's title track was released as a single in both English and French versions, with the French video receiving airplay on TFO and MusiquePlus, and the English video receiving airplay on MuchMusic. The video was filmed in the cavern at Science North.

Berthiaume, Poulin and Tremblay continued with the band, which added Jason Richer on bass and Josée Poulin on violin and keyboards. Their first full-length album, Univers dissimulé, was released in 2003. The album won the award for francophone album of the year at the inaugural Northern Ontario Music and Film Awards, and the making of the album was filmed by John Hartman for a documentary film, which won the award for Best Film Editing at the same awards. The album's singles included "Holes in You" and "Fait à la maison". In 2004, they performed at the Francofête festival in Moncton, New Brunswick.

They released their second album, Morgue, in 2005. Their tour to support the album included participation in Tour Tournée, a bilingual touring concert sponsored by CBC Radio 3 and Bande à part.

With a lineup now consisting of Berthiaume, Marie Boulanger on guitar and keyboards, Shawn Arseneau on bass and Cory Lalonde on drums, the band relocated to Montreal before their self-titled third album was released in 2008. The album featured the band's biggest hit, "Je t'aime Québec", which was based on a poem by Patrice Desbiens, as well as the song "La mère de toutes les dystopies", based on a poem by Robert Dickson, and a cover of Jean-Pierre Ferland's "God Is an American". The album was also accompanied by a short National Film Board documentary, À l'ombre d'un Konflit Dramatik, about the making of the "Je t'aime Québec" video.

In 2009, the band changed its name to Konflit, and released the album Shift. They have not released any further albums since Shift, but released several new standalone singles to their Bandcamp page in 2013 and 2017 under a style that has evolved toward electronic trance music.

== Discography ==
- Hors d'œuvre dresse la table (2001)
- Univers dissimulé (2003)
- Morgue (2005)
- Konflit Dramatik (2008)
- Shift (2009)
