= Mattawa, Ontario =

Mattawa
- Town (single-tier)
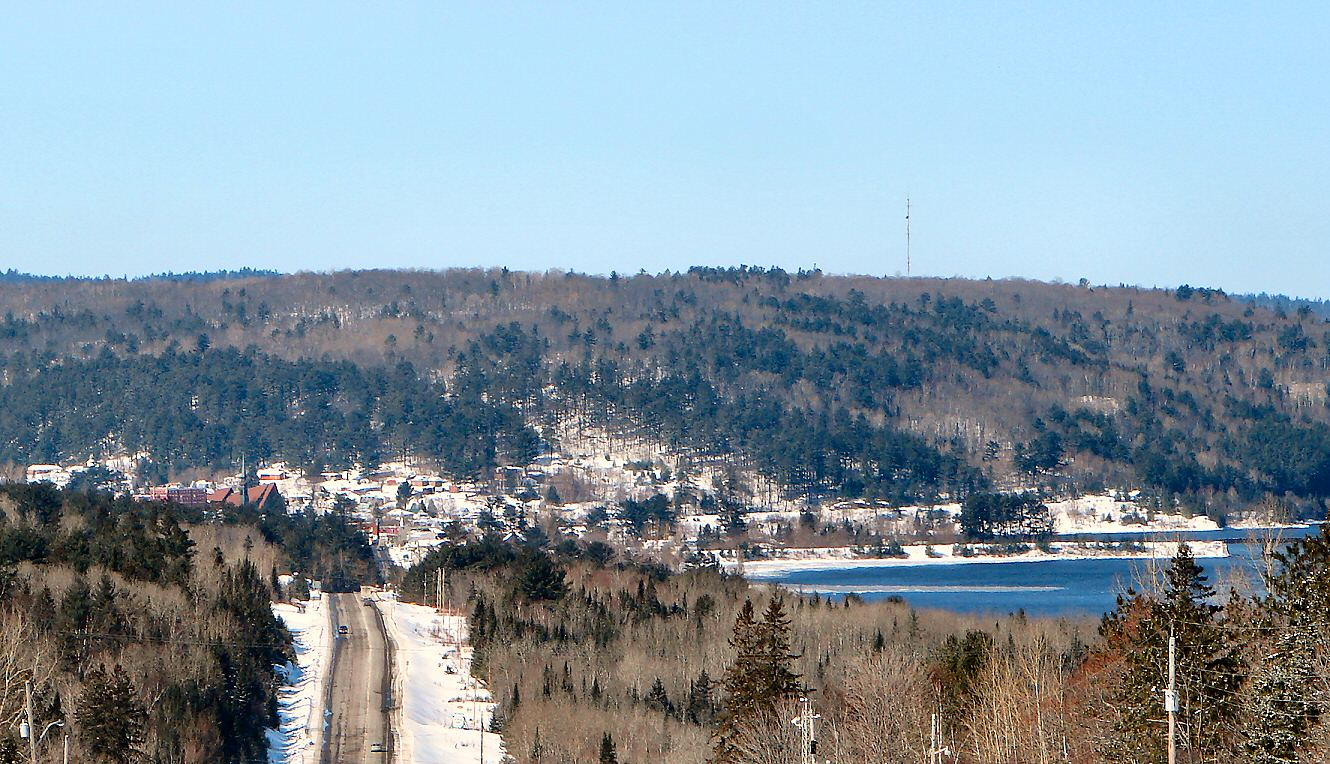

- Location within Ontario
- Coordinates: 46°19′N 78°42′W
- Country: Canada
- Province: Ontario
- District: Nipissing
- Founded: 1830s
- Incorporated: 1883

Government
  - Mayor: Raymond A. Belanger
  - MP: Pauline Rochefort (L)
  - MPP: Vic Fedeli (PC)

Area
  - Land: 3.67 km^{2} (1.42 sq mi)
- Elevation: 171 m (562 ft)

Population (2021)
  - Total: 1,881
  - Density: 513.1/km^{2} (1,329/sq mi)
- Time zone: UTC-5 (EST)
  - Summer (DST): UTC-4 (EDT)
- Postal Code: P0H 1V0
- Website: www.mattawa.ca

Mattawa is a town in northeastern Ontario, Canada, at the confluence of the Mattawa and Ottawa Rivers in Nipissing District. The first Europeans to pass through this area were Étienne Brûlé and Samuel de Champlain.

== History ==
In 1610, Étienne Brûlé and in 1615, Samuel de Champlain were the first Europeans to travel through the Mattawa area. For some 200 years thereafter, it was a link in the important water route leading from Montreal west to Lake Superior. Canoes travelling west up the Ottawa turned left at "the Forks" (the mouth of the Mattawa) to enter the "Petite Rivière" ("Small River", as compared to the Ottawa), before continuing on to Lake Nipissing.

Other notable travellers who passed by Mattawa include: Jean Nicolet in 1620, Jean de Brébeuf in 1626, Gabriel Lallemant in 1648, Pierre-Esprit Radisson and Médard des Groseilliers in 1658, La Verendrye in 1731, Alexander MacKenzie in 1794, and David Thompson in 1812.

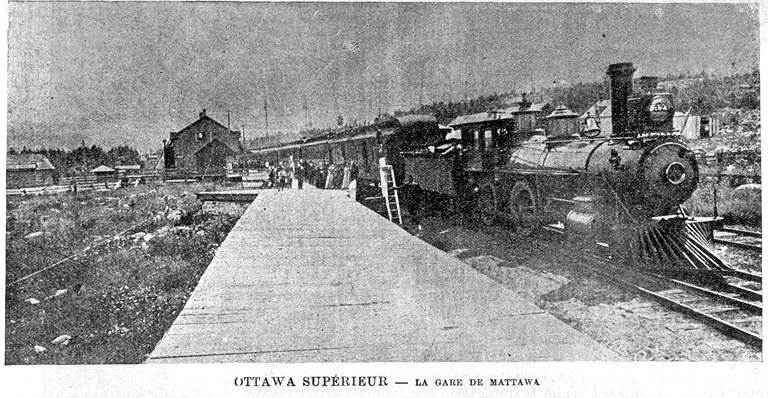
Train at the Mattawa station, 1892.

The Mattawa House was established by the Northwest Company in 1784. In the 1820s and 1830s, the Hudson's Bay Company (after it had merged with the Northwest Company) sent canoe brigades from their Fort Coulonge Post to the Mattawa River junction in order to trade furs. In 1837, a permanent post was established, but was moved to a new site in the centre of present-day Mattawa in 1843. It was subordinate to Fort Témiscamingue and Fort Coulonge, but after the arrival of the telegraph in 1871 and the railroad in 1880, it became the headquarters of the Timiskaming District. As the fur trade diminished and the population grew, the post became a general store, trading merchandise to supply lumbermen. It closed in the early 20th century (1908 or 1912, depending on source).

In the 19th century, Mattawa became a hub for the logging industry, which would harvest large untouched stands of white pine in the area and use the Mattawa River to transport logs to sawmills. In 1881, the railroad was built to Mattawa. It was mostly built by French Canadian labourers. After the railroad's completion, some of these labourers and their families settled in Mattawa (and surrounding areas), bringing with them their culture and heritage.

Logging is still an important industry in this region, and nearby provincial parks and wilderness support the camping/hunting/fishing tourism industry in Mattawa today. Mattawa is located on the Canadian Pacific Railway Chalk River subdivision, connecting Smiths Falls and North Bay, with an additional connection to Témiscaming, Quebec.

Mattawa elected Canada's first-ever Black mayor, Firmin Monestime, in 1963. He served until his death in 1977.

In April 2010, the old Mattawa hospital (visible as the red building in the adjacent image) was demolished amid controversy, since the building was a local landmark for which heritage status was considered. A new Mattawa Hospital had been in service for about a year. The area is also served by the regional hospital in nearby North Bay. The old hospital site was used for the construction of a secondary school, funded by the Province of Ontario through the Conseil Scolaire de District Catholique Franco-Nord.

== Demographics ==
In the 2021 Census of Population conducted by Statistics Canada, Mattawa had a population of 1,881 living in 857 of its 929 total private dwellings, a change of −5.6% from its 2016 population of 1,993. With a land area of 3.67 km^{2} (1.42 sq mi), it had a population density of 512.5/km^{2} (1,327.5/sq mi) in 2021.

Canada census – Mattawa community profile

	2021	2016	2011
Population	1,881 (-5.6% from 2016)	1,993 (-1.5% from 2011)	2023 (1.0% from 2006)
Land area	3.67 km^{2} (1.42 sq mi)	3.66 km^{2} (1.41 sq mi)	3.66 km^{2} (1.41 sq mi)
Population density	513.1/km^{2} (1,329/sq mi)	544.8/km^{2} (1,411/sq mi)	553.5/km^{2} (1,434/sq mi)
Median age	53.6 (M: 52.8, F: 53.6)	51.7 (M: 51.2, F: 52.2)	46.4 (M: 45.8, F: 46.9)
Private dwellings	929 (total) 857 (occupied)	979 (total) 891 (occupied)	888 (total)
Median household income	$53,200	$45,696

References: 2021 2016 2011

Historical census populations – Mattawa, Ontario

Year	Pop.	±%
1881	322	—
1891	1,438	+346.6%
1901	1,400	−2.6%
1911	1,524	+8.9%
1921	1,462	−4.1%
1931	1,631	+11.6%
1941	1,971	+20.8%
1951	3,097	+57.1%

Year	Pop.	±%
1956	3,208	+3.6%
1961	3,314	+3.3%
1966	3,143	−5.2%
1971	2,881	−8.3%
1976	2,849	−1.1%
1981	2,652	−6.9%
1986	2,535	−4.4%
1991	2,454	−3.2%

Year	Pop.	±%
1996	2,281	−7.0%
2001	2,270	−0.5%
2006	2,003	−11.8%
2011	2,023	+1.0%
2016	1,993	−1.5%
2021	1,881	−5.6%

Source: Statistics Canada

Mother tongue (2021):

- English as first language: 68.8 %
- French as first language: 24.5 %
- English and French as first languages: 4.7 %
- Other as first language: 1.7 %

== Attractions ==
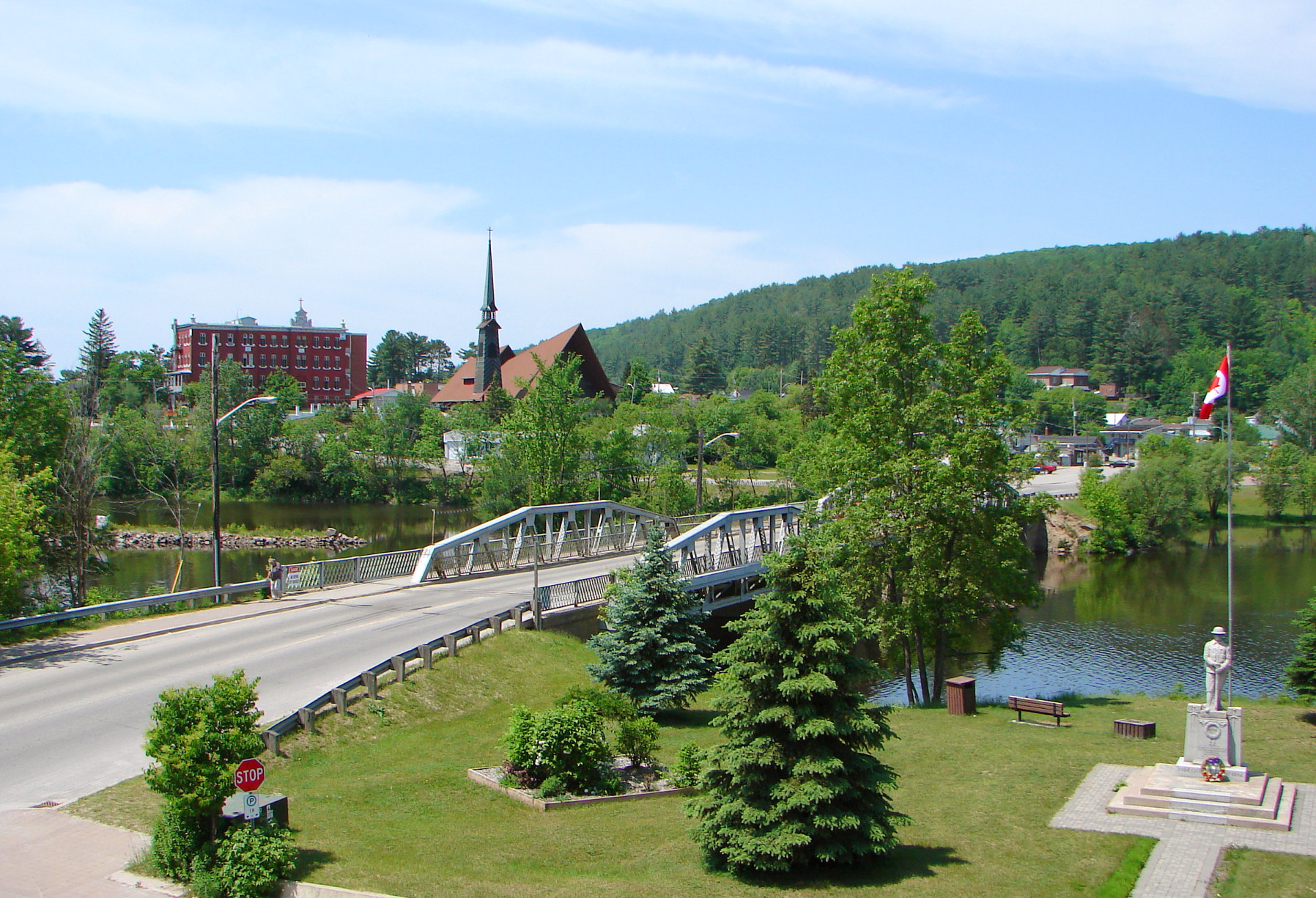
2006 view from downtown Mattawa with Highway 533 and the Mattawa River.

Mattawa is the site of many large wooden statues depicting local historical figures, such as Champlain, Pierre-Esprit Radisson, Médard des Groseilliers, and others. The Mattawa Museum prominently features a 17 ft (5.2 m) statue of Big Joe Mufferaw, a regional folk hero. The statues are placed widely throughout Mattawa, and in two locations outside the town on nearby Highway 17.

Three crosses are on the mountain on the east side of the Ottawa River, immediately opposite the mouth of the Mattawa River.In 1686, the Chevalier de Troyes had three crosses erected while leading an expedition to attack English trading posts on James Bay. This let voyageurs more easily spot the entrance to the Mattawa and thereby access the upper Great Lakes. The crosses have been replaced several times. They are accessible via a trail which begins at the Quebec end of the railroad bridge which crosses the Ottawa.

Mattawa provides access to numerous dropping off points for canoeing or boating on the Ottawa River. The river acts as a natural border between the hills of the province of Quebec and Ontario. The Mattawa River flows through the Canadian Shield, and wildlife can often be seen and heard. The area offers fishing, camping, and hiking. There are numerous motels, campgrounds, and retreat centres in and around Mattawa.

Just west is Samuel de Champlain Provincial Park, on the Mattawa River. The park is also home of the Canadian Ecology Centre, an eco-friendly retreat centre that is facilitated to accommodate business retreats. Algonquin Provincial Park can be accessed from the north side in Kiosk or the east side in Brent.

The town and nearby area contain over 200 kilometres (120 mi) of year-round ATV and snowmobile trails, known as the Voyageur Multi Use Trail System (VMUTS).

In 2007, Mattawa and the townships of Bonfield, Papineau-Cameron, Mattawan and Calvin were rebranded as a single Mattawa Voyageur Country tourist region, in order to promote the area.

=== Voyageur Days ===
Every summer since 1997, the Mattawa Voyageur Days Festival is held the last weekend (Thursday-Sunday) of July. It is organized by the Town of Mattawa. Concerts take place behind the Museum on Explorer's Point, with many other events and attractions around town. Some of the events include a regional talent night, car show, lumberjack competition, and canoe race. Live music is a large part of the Festival, and has in the past included such notable Canadian musicians as April Wine, Trooper, Saga, Loverboy, Honeymoon Suite, Chuck Labelle, David Wilcox, Peter Frampton, Heart, Tom Cochrane and as well as Survivor. Up-and-coming artists from inside and outside the region take the stage on the Thursday night.

On the Sunday night, at dusk, there is a traditional choreographed fireworks show.

Mattawa Voyageur Days celebrated its 10th anniversary in July 2007, selling out of its 7,000 admission wristbands before the event had begun. In 2008, Festivals and Events Ontario listed Mattawa Voyageur Days as one of the Top 100 Ontario Festivals.

== Musical references ==
Blue Rodeo released a song called "Mattawa" on their 2013 album In Our Nature. Mattawa is also mentioned in the Stompin' Tom Connors song "Big Joe Mufferaw", which references a Canadian folk hero named Big Joe Mufferaw who supposedly "paddled into Mattawa, all the way from Ottawa in just one day." Mattawa is the 16th location (of 90) mentioned in the North American version of Geoff Mack's country song I've Been Everywhere.

== Media ==
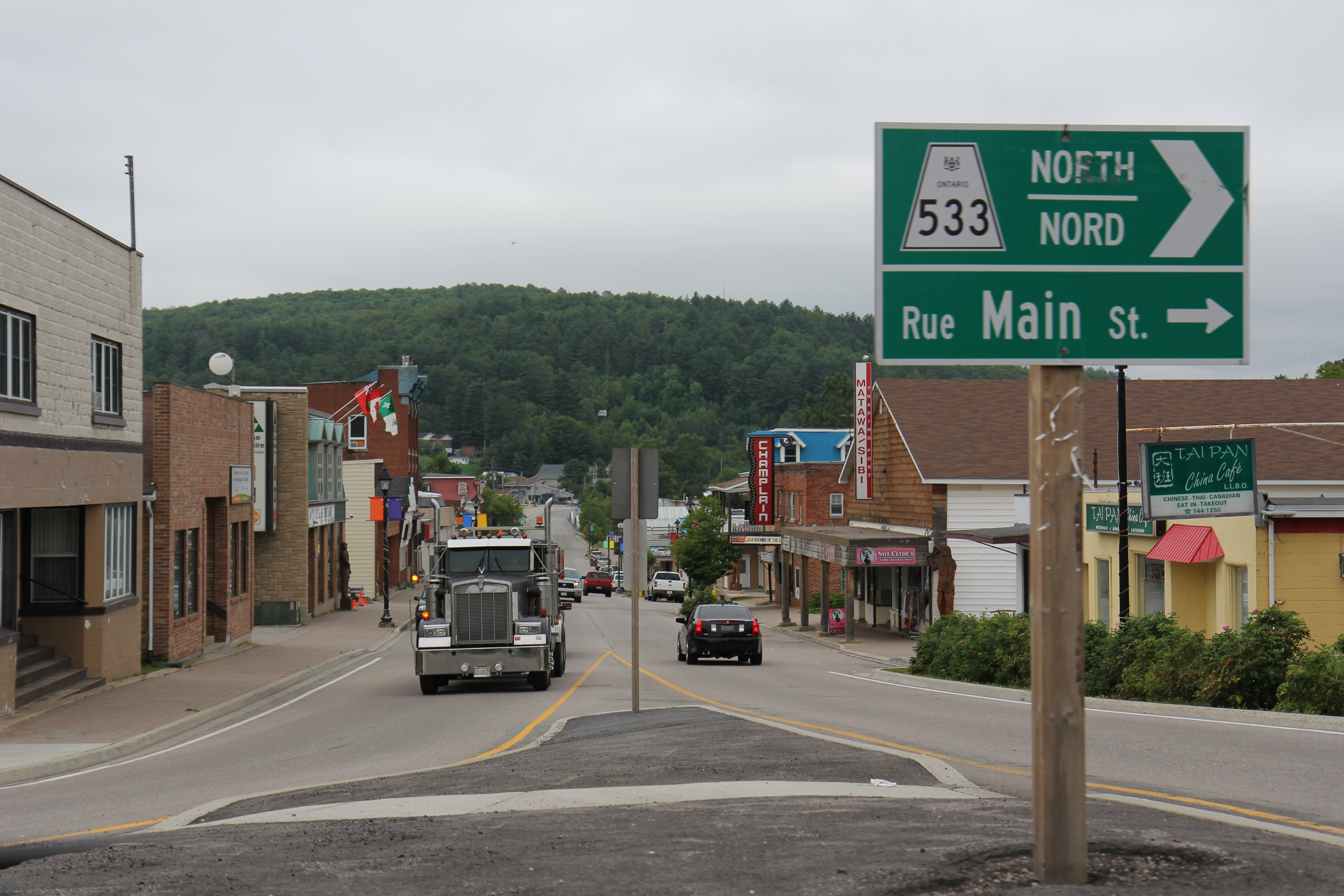
Downtown Mattawa

=== Radio ===
Mattawa is served by two low-power AM repeaters of Greater Sudbury's CBC Radio stations, including one FM radio station CJTK-FM:

Frequency	Call sign	Branding	Format	Owner	Notes
AM 1090	CBON-12	Ici Radio-Canada Première	Talk radio, public radio	Canadian Broadcasting Corporation	Rebroadcaster of CBON-FM Sudbury. Formerly CBOF-5, and a former rebroadcaster of CBOF Ottawa.
AM 1240	CBLO	CBC Radio One	Talk radio, public radio	Canadian Broadcasting Corporation	Rebroadcaster of CBCS-FM Sudbury
FM 93.9	CJTK-FM-4	KFM	Christian music	Harvest Ministries Sudbury	Rebroadcaster of CJTK-FM-1 North Bay, Ontario

The town is otherwise served by radio stations from North Bay.

=== Print ===
Mattawa's weekly newspaper The Mattawa Recorder has been in publication since 1972. It is owned and published by Tom and Heather Edwards.

== Notable people ==
- Anahareo, wife of writer and conservationist Grey Owl
- Mauril Bélanger, Member of Parliament (1995–2016)
- Lillian Bilsky Freiman, philanthropist and Zionist
- Donald Hogarth, politician and mining financier
- Chuck Labelle, Franco-Ontarian singer/songwriter
- John C. Major, puisine justice of the Supreme Court of Canada (1992–2005)
- Dr. Firmin Monestime, Canada's first black mayor
- Gilbert Parent, Speaker of the House of Commons of Canada
- Chick Webster, hockey player

== See also ==
- List of francophone communities in Ontario
