= Weengushk International Film Festival =

- Location: Manitoulin Island, Ontario, Canada
- Hosted by: Shirley Cheechoo

The Weengushk International Film Festival is an annual film festival on Manitoulin Island in the Canadian province of Ontario. Organized by Shirley Cheechoo's Weengushk Film Institute in partnership with Brock University and staged for the first time in 2018, the festival presents a program of local, national and international Indigenous-themed films, primarily but not exclusively in M'Chigeeng.

Cheechoo launched the festival after years of lobbying to get established Canadian film festivals to include more indigenous-themed films in their programs. She noted that the nearby Cinéfest Sudbury International Film Festival had worked with her more actively than most festivals in scheduling films of interest to First Nations audiences in the Sudbury and Manitoulin areas, but said that due to its size and the diversity of the audience it had to program for, even Cinéfest had struggled to make as much space for new and emerging indigenous filmmakers as Cheechoo felt the community needed.

Due to the COVID-19 pandemic in Canada, the 2020 festival was staged online. The 2020 festival included the films Red Snow, The Body Remembers When the World Broke Open, Happy Face, There Are No Fakes and One Day in the Life of Noah Piugattuk, as well as a retrospective program of Cheechoo's own films and live musical performances by Crystal Shawanda, Nick Sherman, Adrian Sutherland and Leland Bell. Actor Gary Farmer and actress and producer Jennifer Podemski presented workshops on acting and production, and journalist and arts administrator Jesse Wente gave the keynote speech.

The 2023 festival program included the films Bones of Crows, Buffy Sainte-Marie: Carry It On, Beautiful Scars and Rosie, and special awards to Ryan Reynolds for his humanitarian work, Graham Greene in honour of his work to improve indigenous representation in cinema, and musicians Derek Miller and Murray Porter.

The 2024 program included the films Sugarcane, Hey, Viktor!, Tautuktavuk (What We See), Twice Colonized, Lakota Nation vs. United States and WaaPaKe, along with musical performances by Aysanabee, Adrian Sutherland, Nishina Esquega and The Poets, an all-indigenous Tragically Hip tribute band.
