= Nick Sherman =

Native American folk singer

- Born: 1987 (age 38–39)
- Origin: Thunder Bay, Ontario
- Genres: Singer-songwriter; folk; folk-rock; alternative folk; acoustic
- Occupations: Musician; artist
- Instruments: Guitar; vocals
- Years active: 2012–present
- Website: http://www.nicksherman.ca/

Nicholas Jowin Sherman known professionally as Nick Sherman is an Oji-Cree singer-songwriter from Thunder Bay, Ontario.

== Early life ==
Nick Sherman was born in 1987 and raised in Sioux Lookout, Ontario where he became involved with the small punk scene at a young age, which has informed his music.

Sherman's music is inspired by his trips up to North Caribou Lake First Nation where his grandfather would take him trapping, play his guitar, and sing. Sherman attended the Winnipeg Business College where he studied broadcasting before starting his career at CBC Radio in Thunder Bay.

== Career ==
Nick Sherman was featured by Voyage North and Superior Morning on the CBC Thunder Bay's 40th anniversary broadcast, and also featured in the live performance for the anniversary. Sherman also participated in CBC's Unreserved Indigenous Music Mentorship Program.

In 2012, Sherman released his debut album Drag Your Words Through, which had been preceded by "Winterdark", a single from the album. The album was supported with funding from the Ontario Arts Council.

In 2015, Sherman released a promotional single, "Ghost Town" from his upcoming sophomore album Knives & Wildrice. The album and its creation was discussed and deconstructed in a podcast of the same name on the Indian & Cowboy Podcast Network. Knives & Wildrice received the 2017 Indigenous Music Awards best folk album.

Sherman released his third full length album Made Of in 2019. Due to COVID-19, he has been unable to go on tour.

Next, he released a single entitled "Unbreakable" in 2020, accompanied by a music video, sponsored by the Aboriginal Peoples Television Network, in a series entitled Amplify.

The play, The Mush Hole, produced by Kaha:wi Dance Theatre, featured Nick Sherman's song “Find My Way” as part of the music score.

== Personal life ==
Nick Sherman is married to Ukrainian-Ojibwa artist Candace Twance. They have two children. He also has two brothers-in-law and two sisters-in-law.

== Discography ==
=== Studio albums ===
- Drag Your Words Through (2012)
- Knives & Wildrice (2015)
- Made Of (2019)

=== Singles ===
- Winterdark (2012)
- Ghost Town (2015)
- Unbreakable (2020)

== Concerts ==
- Aboriginal Awareness Week Concert
- Calgary Folk Festival
- Northern Lights Festival Boréal
- Toronto Indigenous Arts Festival
- 4th Annual Maadaadizi Orientation
- Live on the Waterfront presented by Ontario Power Generation
- 3rd Annual Weengushk International Film Festival
- PRAS Summer Festival 2019
- Definitely Superior Art Gallery
- Keewaytinook High School Graduation
- The Sioux Mountain Music Festival
