= Firmin Monestime =

Canadian politician (1909–1977)

- Born: December 16, 1909; Cap-Haïtien
- Died: October 27, 1977 (aged 67)
- Education: University of Haiti
- Spouse: Zenaida Petschersky (married 1953–)

Saint-Firmin (S. F.) Monestime (December 16, 1909 – October 27, 1977) was a Haitian-Canadian politician and medical doctor, who was the first Black Canadian elected mayor of a Canadian municipality.

== Background ==
Born in Cap-Haïtien in 1909, Monestime was one of seven children. His father was a successful tanner.

He moved to Quebec City in 1945. Before departing, he separated from his wife at the time, with whom he had two children — Monestime continued to support them from abroad.

He later married Zena Petschersky, an immigrant from Danzig, whom he met in Ottawa in 1953. Together, they had four children.

== Medical career ==
Monestime studied rural medicine and wrote three books on the subject. He graduated from University of Haiti with a medical degree. In 1937, he was one of the only doctors on duty during the Parsley Massacre, and was subsequently awarded the Haitian Legion of Merit for his work during that crisis.

After upgrading his medical training he planned a move to Timmins, Ontario to set up a medical practice, but when he stopped in Mattawa, Ontario en route, he was convinced by a restaurant owner to stay in that town and set up practice there instead.

Monestime practiced medicine in Mattawa until 1964, when he became mayor.

== Politics ==
In 1962, Monestime ran for to be on the council of Mattawa and was elected. The next year, he was elected mayor of Mattawa in 1963.

He was active with the Progressive Conservative Party of Canada, and served as its national director. He considered running federally for the party, and in 1971 he ran and lost in a bid for the presidency of the party. A Red Tory, Monestime was attracted to the party because of Prime Minister John Diefenbaker's Bill of Rights.

In 1970, he became director of The Progressive Conservative Party and tried his hand at running for the President of Progressive Conservative Party for Nipissing, but was unsuccessful.

In 1971, he was re-elected as mayor. Except for one year that he took off for personal reasons, he remained mayor until his death due to pancreatic cancer in 1977.

== Death of son ==
On February 29, 1976, Monestime's 21-year-old son, Fedia, was shot and killed outside the Trans-Canada Hotel in Mattawa. He was in a group chasing a man who had fired his rifle into the wall after a bar fight, when the man fired on them, also injuring three others. Monestime treated three others wounded during the incident. Ralph Childerhose was charged with murder and acquitted, a decision Monestime considered unjust.

== Legacy ==
Monestime and his wife opened the Algonquin Nursing Home in Mattawa in 1976. His daughter Vala Monestime Belter continued to run the nursing home, and has served on the boards of Ontario Northland and TVOntario.

Where Rivers Meet: The Story of Dr. S. F. Monestime, Canada's First Black Mayor, a biography by historian Doug Mackey, was published in 2009.

A permanent exhibit related to Monestime was put on display at the Mattawa Museum.

In 2014, Frantz Liautaud, the current ambassador of Haiti to Canada, visited Mattawa for a gala celebration of the 50th anniversary of Monestime's first election as mayor.
