= Canadian Ecology Centre =

Outdoor education complex in Ontario, Canada

Coordinates: 46°17′56″N 78°52′37″W

The Canadian Ecology Centre (CEC) is an outdoor education complex located within Samuel de Champlain Provincial Park, near the town of Mattawa, Ontario.

== Overview ==
The Canadian Ecology Centre site consists of a main building and several smaller cabins on a tract of land within Samuel de Champlain Provincial Park. The CEC is a non-profit organization and was initially supported by proponents within the logging and wood industries, such as Tembec, as well as by various levels of government, NGOs, and public donors. The CEC facilities, while contemporary in both age and design, are constructed almost entirely out of wood.

The CEC is primarily an educational and research centre, where courses ranging from local culture and history to biology and science to forestry management and mining are offered to the public. The site is also equipped with high-speed internet access, and can be rented out as a wedding venue, conference or meeting centre. Cabins can also be rented for a nightly rate as an alternative to "tenting it" in the park.

The centre, like much of the surrounding communities, is almost fully bilingual and offers most programs in English and French.

The CEC is also the headquarters for the Canadian Institute of Forestry.

== Eco-Camp ==
The CEC hosts the Eco-Camp summer program offering academic credit to high school students. Formal two-week courses in subjects such as science, biology, environmental science and geography are available. The program is residential, and students live on-site for the duration.

== Professional development ==
The CEC offers professional development opportunities. Single or multi-day programs are designed and developed to provide hands-on learning opportunities as well as networking opportunities. Professional training and certifications are also available.
