= Samuel de Champlain Provincial Park =

Provincial park in Ontario, Canada

- IUCN category II (national park)
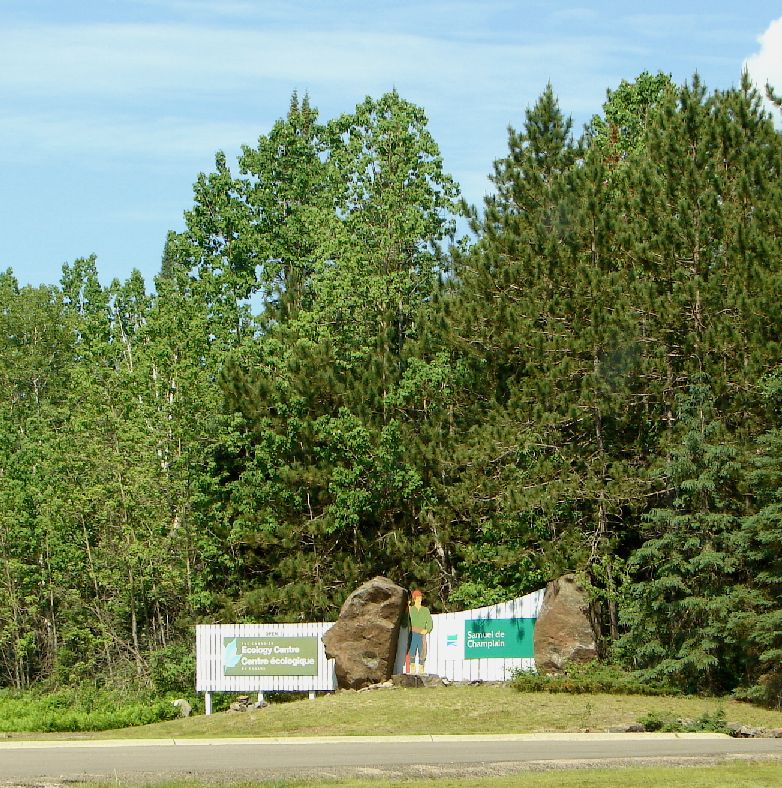

- Location within Ontario
- Interactive map of Samuel de Champlain Provincial Park
- Location: Ontario, Canada
- Nearest city: Mattawa, Ontario
- Coordinates: 46°17′30″N 78°52′30″W
- Area: 25.5 km^{2} (9.8 sq mi)
- Visitors: 48,529 (in 2022)
- Governing body: Ontario Parks
- Website: www.ontarioparks.ca/park/samueldechamplain

Samuel de Champlain Provincial Park is a provincial park in Ontario, Canada.

The park spans both sides of the Mattawa River. It has an area of 25.5 square kilometres (9.8 sq mi) and is about 14 kilometres (8.7 mi) west of Mattawa, Ontario, Canada. It is administered by Ontario Parks, which classifies it as a natural environment park.

This park is popular in the summer with campers, providing many recreational activities such as canoeing, swimming, hiking, wildlife viewing, and other family activities. The visitors centre houses the Voyageur Heritage Centre, which highlights the historic importance of the Mattawa River to the fur trade through interactive exhibits. The park is also home to the Canadian Ecology Centre, an outdoor education centre, which provides educational programs on sustainable forestry.

The park is named after Samuel de Champlain, one of the first French explorers of Canada of the 17th century.

On June 21, 2025, a downburst hit the park, destroying two campgrounds, and causing serious injuries to some campers, and causing "millions (of dollars) in damage".

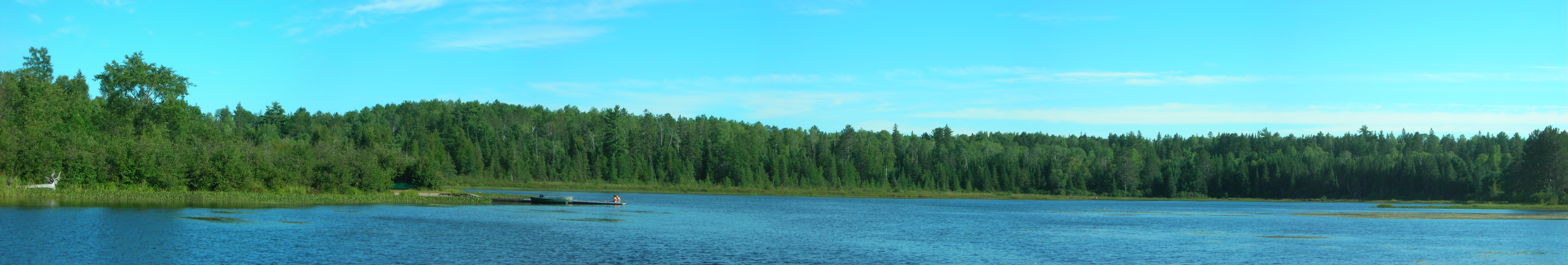
Looking south over Moore Lake
