= André Paiement =

Canadian playwright and musician

- Born: 28 June 1950; Sturgeon Falls, Ontario, Canada
- Died: 23 January 1978 (aged 27); Sudbury, Ontario, Canada
- Occupations: Playwright, Musician

André Paiement (June 28, 1950 – January 23, 1978) was a Canadian playwright and musician. He was one of the most prominent Franco-Ontarian artists, playing a key role in developing many of the cultural institutions of the community.

== Biography ==
Born in Sturgeon Falls, Ontario, Paiement studied translation at Laurentian University in Sudbury, and got involved in theatre.

Paiement, with a group of artists that included Robert Paquette and writer and broadcaster Denis St-Jules, wrote and staged the musical Moé, j'viens du Nord, s'tie! in 1970. The artists subsequently formed the Coopérative des artistes du Nouvel Ontario, which evolved in a variety of directions. Some of the artists, including Paiement, established the professional theatre company Théâtre du Nouvel-Ontario. Others, including Paiement and his sister Rachel, subsequently formed the progressive rock band, CANO-Musique.

Paiement himself was active in both the theatre and band projects. His stage productions included Et le septième jour..., À mes fils bien-aimés, La vie et les temps de Médéric Boileau, Lavalléville and an adaptation in Franco-Ontarian dialect (joual) of Molière's Malade imaginaire. He was also a key organizer behind the music festivals La Nuit sur l'étang and Northern Lights Festival Boréal.

Paiement died by suicide on January 23, 1978, aged 27.

== Works ==
=== Theater plays ===
- 1970 - Moé j'viens du Nord, s'tie!
- 1970 - Et le septième jour
- 1971 - Pépère parent
- 1972 - À mes fils bien-aimés
- 1973 - La Vie et les temps de Médéric Boileau
- 1974 - Lavalléville, comédie musicale franco-ontarienne
- 1977 - A book of thoughts and words, inédit.

=== Songs ===
- See CANO
- 1968 - At morn, at noon, at twilight dim
- 1977 - Blue dragonfly
