= Chuck Labelle =

Canadian musician

- Born: 18 March 1954 (age 72)
- Origin: Mattawa, Ontario, Canada
- Genres: Country rock
- Occupations: Musician, songwriter
- Instruments: Singing, guitar
- Years active: 1994–present
- Award: Prix Hommage award (2015)
- Website: chucklabelle.com

Jean-Guy (Chuck) Labelle (born 18 March 1954) is a Franco-Canadian singer-songwriter and guitarist who performs francophone New Country-Rock music. He is from Mattawa, Ontario. His first album, Chuck, reached Gold status after two years and his second album, Un cadeau de Noël, with partner Robert Paquette, also reached Gold. His 1999 single, Le Cowboy, released in both French and English versions, was No. 1 on the European country music charts. However, in a 1999 interview on the music business, Labelle also commented that "Getting known; carving my name into the history of Franco-Ontarian performers. Distribution is a big problem." Labelle has written and produced over 150 original songs. In 2015, he received the Prix Hommage award from the Association des professionels de la chanson et de la musique.

== Discography ==
- Chuck. 1994. Produced by Robert Paquette.
- Un Cadeau de Noël. 1995. Duo with Robert Paquette. Produced by Chuck Labelle and Robert Paquette.
- Terre fragile. 1997. Produced by Robert Paquette and Dan Bédard.
- No Getting Over You. 1999. The Nashville Sessions. Four-song EP. Produced by Randall Prescott.
- Le Cowboy – The Cowboy. 1999. Single. Comstock Records, Arizona.
- Noël encore un fois. 2000. Produced by Chuck Labelle and Robert Paquette.
- Noël en tout et partout. 2005. Produced by Robert Paquette and Shawn Sasyniuk.
- Plus jamais comme avant. 2008. TOMO Records. Produced by Charles Fairfield and Normand Daoust, recorded at N-Code Studios.
- Le plus beau des cadeaux. 2010. PLR Productions. Produced by Frank Labelle.
