= Tous dans l'même bateau =

Studio album by CANO
- Released: 1976
- Genre: Progressive rock
- Length: 41:57
- Label: A&M

CANO chronology
Tous dans l'même bateau (1976)	Au nord de notre vie (1977)

Tous dans l'même bateau (All in the Same Boat) is the debut album by the Canadian progressive rock group, CANO. Released in 1976, the album was produced by Luc Cousineau and Jon Red Mitchell.

In 2021, two of the album's classic songs, André Paiement's "Dimanche après-midi" and Marcel Aymar's "Baie Sainte-Marie," were inducted into the Canadian Songwriters Hall of Fame.

== Track listing ==
1. "Viens nous voir" (8:35)
2. "Dimanche après-midi" (3:41)
3. "Pluie estivale" (2:53)
4. "Le vieux Médéric" (2:59)
5. "Les rues d'Ottawa" (3:49)
6. "En plein hiver" (9:30)
7. "Chanson pour Suzie" (1:05)
8. "Baie Sainte-Marie" (9:29)
