= Kevin Closs =

Canadian singer-songwriter

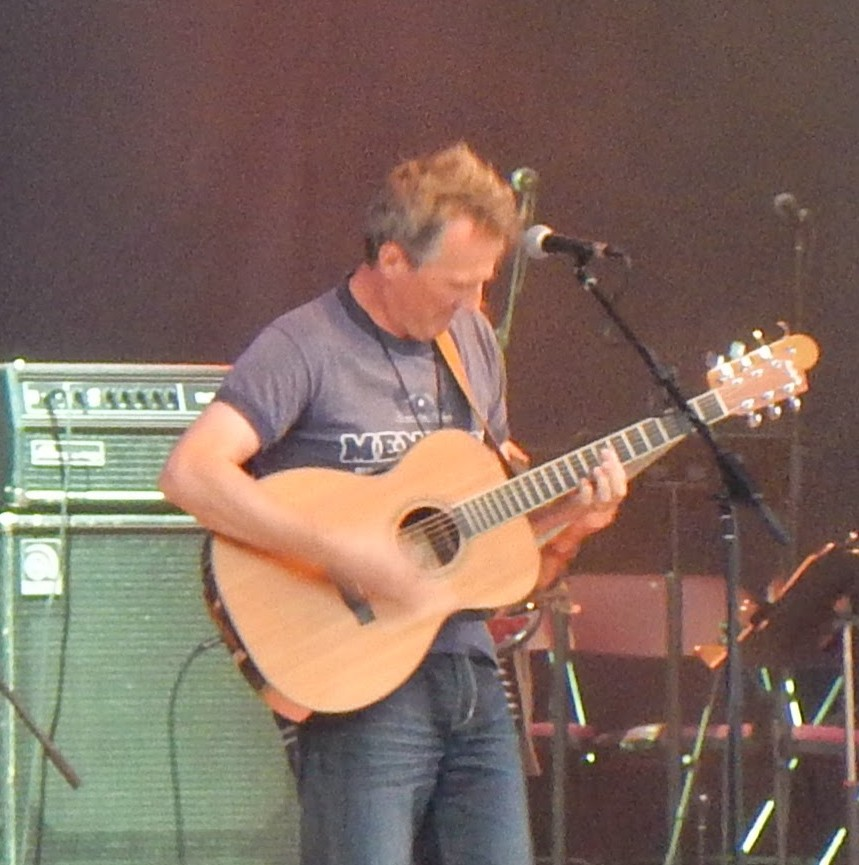
- At Northern Lights Festival Boreal, 2014

Background information
- Born: 1963 (age 62–63); Sault Ste. Marie, Ontario, Canada
- Origin: Manitowaning, Ontario, Canada
- Genres: Rock, Country
- Occupation: Singer-songwriter
- Years active: 1989–present
- Formerly of: The Nobs
- Website: www.kevincloss.com

Kevin Closs (born 1963) is a Canadian singer-songwriter and author, who has recorded and toured both as a solo performer and with his rock band The Nobs.

Closs was born in Sault Ste. Marie and raised on Manitoulin Island, and currently lives in the Onaping Falls neighbourhood of Sudbury. An independent recording artist since 1989, he is best known for his song "Erica", a Canadian Top 40 hit in 1994. He has also toured as a supporting musician in Charlie Major's band.

He won Northern Lights Festival Boréal's Jackie Washington Award in 2002, and the Mayor's Celebration of the Arts Award for Lifetime Achievement in the Arts in 2016.

Closs teaches songwriting workshops in schools across Northern Ontario through Learning Through the Arts and through invitations from arts organizations. He has performed in theatre and film productions as both actor and musician, including as Jesus Christ in Theatre Cambrian's 1992 production of Jesus Christ Superstar.

== Discography ==
=== Solo ===
==== Albums ====
| Year | Title |
|---|---|
| 1989 | Coming of Age |
| 1990 | Face Yourself |
| 1993 | Surrender |
| 1996 | Homecoming |
| 2001 | Solar Ethic |
| 2004 | Sun's in My Eyes |
| 2004 | Singer-Songwriter/Etc. |
| 2008 | Heart's End |
| 2013 | All for a Song |
| 2019 | In Deep |
| 2026 | Kicking Thorns |

==== Singles ====
| Year | Single | Chart Positions | | Album |
| Year | Single | CAN AC | CAN Country | Album |
|---|---|---|---|---|
| 1994 | "Home" | 31 | 66 | Surrender |
| 1994 | "Erica" | 26 | | Surrender |

=== The Nobs ===
==== Albums ====
| Year | Title |
|---|---|
| 2002 | The Nobs |
| 2006 | The Nobs II |
