= Ben Sures =

Canadian musician

Ben Sures (born December 29, 1967) is a Canadian roots musician who was a contributor to CBC Radio's The Irrelevant Show.

== Early life ==
He is the son of ceramic artist Jack Sures and painter and illustrator Deborah Uman-Sures.

A mostly-self-taught musician, Sures discovered the music of Robert Johnson at age 15 and devoted himself to the study of blues and roots.

== Career ==
He spent close to a decade as an itinerant street musician and more than 20 years touring the Canadian coffee house and festival circuit both as a solo headliner and as a sideman for blues musicians such as Harp Dog Brown, Rita Chiarelli and Paul Reddick. During that time, he developed a distinctive, quirky songwriting style marked by plain-spoken lyrics that often express unique takes on unusual topics.

He won the folk category of the 2005 John Lennon Song Competition with "Any Precious Girl", a compassionate-yet-unpatronizing song about a young woman with bipolar disorder. In 2006, he won the adult alternative album category of the International Songwriting Competition for the song, "Any Precious Girl".

His album, Gone to Bolivia made Now's Best of the Year lists in 2011, and contained the song "Columbus Sailed Here", in which Sures observes the transformation of third-world countries due to cruise ship tourism. Other notable examples of Sures' style are found on "High School Steps", on which he performs a tribute to Ray Davies of the Kinks by reflecting on the life of high school musicians who saw Davies as their idol.

Sures was the resident musician on CBC Radio's The Irrelevant Show. He has been featured on CBC Radio's “Daybreak Alberta”, “Unreserved” CBC Canada / “Radioactive,” “Canada Live,” “Madly Off in all Directions,” and “Key of A”. Sures has also been featured on CKUA Radio's "The Celtic Show" and "Lunchbox with Grant Stovel" and reached the #1 place on the station's Top 30 in 2022.

Ben has toured extensively across Canada and held long-standing residencies at several major folk festivals, including the Winnipeg Folk Music Festival (1988-2003), Northern Lights Festival Boréal in Sudbury (2000-2019), the Islands Folk Festival in Duncan, BC (1997-2019), and the Brandon Folk Music Festival (1998-2014). Other notable recurring festival performances include the Edmonton Folk Music Festival (2003-2009), The Fillberg Festival in Comox (2004-2019), Edmonton Street Performer's Festival (2010-2014), Edmonton Jazz Festival (2011), Bear Creek Folk Festival (2016) and Winterfolk Blues & Roots Festival residency in Toronto (2015-2020).

His side projects include The Death Ballad Love Tellers, a song circle with fellow underground folk singers David P. Smith and Buba Uno, in which the performers challenge themselves to write murder ballads and perform them on stage.

In 2018, Ben wrote a book, "The Boy Who Walked Backwards" published by the Manitoba First Nations Education Resource Centre and illustrated by Nicole Marie Burton. The book is a moving story about a young Ojibway boy Leo and his family in Serpent River First Nation. Leo's life turns to darkness when forced to attend residential school. Back home for Christmas, Leo uses inspiration from an Ojibway childhood game to deal with his struggles.

== Discography ==
- 1995 – No Absolutes
- 1997 – Ooh Wah Baby
- 2001 – Live: Keep Fresh
- 2003 – Goodbye Pretty Girl
- 2008 – Field Guide to Loneliness
- 2011 – Gone to Bolivia
- 2013 – Son of Trouble
- 2018 – Poema Poematis
- 2019 – Live at the Yardbird Suite
- 2022 – The Story That Lived Here
