= Eclipse (CANO album) =

Studio album by CANO
- Released: 1978
- Genre: Progressive Rock, Art Rock
- Label: A&M
- Producer: Eugene Martynec

Eclipse is the third album by the Canadian progressive rock band, CANO. Produced by Gene Martynec and released in 1978, the album was the band's first to include English-language material. Most of the album was recorded shortly after the death of founding member André Paiement.

== Track listing ==
1. "Soleil mon chef"
2. "Earthly Mother"
3. "Cercles de la nuit"
4. "Rumrunner's Runaway"
5. "Moon Lament"
6. "Ça roule"
7. "Bienvenue 1984"
