= Marcel Aymar =

Canadian musician

Marcel Aymar (born in Meteghan, Nova Scotia) is a Canadian musician, composer, writer and actor. He moved to Sudbury, Ontario, in 1972 as a teen and was a founding member of the popular Franco-Ontarian group CANO, playing guitar. During this time, he was also active in the Théâtre du Nouvel-Ontario.

Aymar, with John Doerr and Marc Cholette, wrote the theme song for CBC Television's The National and SRC's Soirée du Hockey, the French equivalent to Hockey Night in Canada. He also wrote the soundtrack for the film Jerome's Secret (Le secret de Jérôme), and toured with Robert Paquette and Paul Demers as the performing group Paquette-Aymar-Demers.

In 2003, he recorded his self-titled debut solo album, Aymar. The album is diverse, featuring folk cajun styles, rock songs ("Dans un café américain à Paris"), and even ballads.

In 2009, Aymar was awarded the Prix Hommage by the Association des professionnels de la chanson et de la musique at its fifth annual Gala des prix Trille Or.

In 2021, two classic CANO songs from the band's first album, Aymar's "Baie Sainte-Marie" and André Paiement's "Dimanche après-midi," were inducted into the Canadian Songwriters Hall of Fame.

== Discography ==
- Aymar, 2003
