= Jack Sures =

Canadian ceramic artist (1934–2018)

Jack Sures (November 20, 1934 – May 12, 2018) was a Canadian ceramic artist and post-secondary academic.

== Personal background ==
Sures was born at Brandon, Manitoba, in 1934. He graduated from the University of Manitoba in 1957 with a B.F.A. He went on to earn his M.A. in painting and printmaking from the Michigan State University in 1959. After two years working in the United Kingdom and traveling in Europe and the Middle East he established a studio in Winnipeg, Manitoba. He was instrumental in establishing the ceramics department at the University of Saskatchewan, Regina Campus (now the University of Regina). He undertook an appointment in 1973–1974 working in Grenada, West Indies for the United Nations Handcraft Development Program. Sures died on May 12, 2018, at the age of 83.

== Body of work ==
After completing his M.A. Sures moved to the United Kingdom where he worked in London. Here he learned mold making, slip casting and production wheel-throwing. His works are wheel-thrown vessel-based pieces and hand-built sculpture. Sures has worked on various commissions, the most notable being:

- Mural created for the Provincial Office Building in Saskatoon
- Mural for the Musée de la civilisation in Quebec.
- Ceramic pieces for Secretary of State Canada;
- Terrazzo floor for the Wascana Rehabilitation Centre, Regina

== Arts administration ==
Sures has taken a strong interest in arts organizations. He has acted as an adviser or consultant for a number of organizations including the Canada Council regarding ceramic art; the Banff Centre for their facilities and program development; the Regina Wascana Centre Authority on its Fine Arts Committee; and as a member of the Board of the Canadian Conference of the Arts.

== Selected collections ==
Sures' works are in both private and public collections including;

- Saskatchewan Arts Board
- Gardiner Museum, Toronto
- External Affairs Canada
- Province of Saskatchewan
- University of Saskatchewan
- Pecs National Museum, Hungary
- University of Regina
- Musée national des beaux-arts du Québec
- Canadian Museum of History

== Academic positions ==
Sures was Chairman of the Department of Visual Arts at the University of Regina from 1969–1971. On his retirement in 1998 he was granted Professor Emeritus.

== Awards ==
Sures has been recognized for his accomplishments by many honours including;

- Saidye Bronfman Award, 2018
- Saskatchewan Arts Award for Lifetime Achievement, 2017
- Canada Council Study Grant 1965 and 1972 to study in Japan and France respectively.
- Awarded Grand Prize, International Ceramic Exhibition, Mino, Japan, 1989
- Order of Canada, inducted as Member, 1991
- Province of Saskatchewan, Recognized for contributions to Canada and the Province, 1992.
- Saskatchewan Order of Merit, 2003
- Alumni Association Award for Excellence in Undergraduate Teaching, University of Regina, 1991
- Alumni Association Award for Excellence in Research, University of Regina, 1992
- International Academy of Ceramics, Elected as member
- Commemorative Medal of the 125th Anniversary of The Confederation of Canada, Recognition for Significant Contribution to Compatriots and to Canada
- Queen Elizabeth II Diamond Jubilee Medal, 2012

== See also ==
- List of Canadian artists
