= CANO =

Canadian progressive rock band

- Origin: Sudbury, Ontario, Canada
- Genres: Progressive rock
- Years active: 1975–1985
- Past members: André Paiement; Rachel Paiement; Wasyl Kohut; Marcel Aymar; David Burt; Michel Kendel; John Doerr; Michel Dasti; Bill Cymbala; Ben Mink; Mary Lu Zahalan

CANO, a Canadian progressive rock band of the 1970s and 1980s, was the most successful popular musical group in Franco-Ontarian history.

== Origins ==
CANO evolved out of the Coopérative des artistes du Nouvel-Ontario (Artists' Cooperative of Northern Ontario), an artists' collective established in Sudbury, Ontario, in 1970. The cooperative was responsible for developing many of the current cultural institutions of the city's Franco-Ontarian community. The Galerie du Nouvel-Ontario, Prise de Parole publishing house, Théâtre du Nouvel-Ontario, La Nuit sur l'étang and CANO-Musique, as the band was then called, all evolved out of projects launched by artists associated with the cooperative.

While based in Sudbury, the cooperative bought an abandoned 320-acre farm in Earlton that became an artists' haven and buffalo ranch.

== Musical group ==
The group consisted of singer-guitarist siblings André Paiement and Rachel Paiement, violinist Wasyl Kohut, guitarists Marcel Aymar and David Burt, pianist Michel Kendel, bassist John Doerr and drummer Michel Dasti. The band was formed in the fall of 1975, and performed its first concert on December 1 at La Slague in Sudbury.

The band also recorded its debut album, Tous dans l'même bateau, released in 1976. The production studio was a converted building on the Paiements' farm near Sturgeon Falls.

The band performed both traditional French folk songs and original material by Aymar, the Paiements and Robert Dickson. With its third album, Eclipse, CANO began performing English-language songs as well; the fourth album, Rendezvous, consisted predominantly of English songs as the band made a bid for success in the larger English-language market. The band was most successful on francophone pop charts in Quebec and France, but had notable hits in English Canada as well. Eclipse and Rendezvous, notably, both charted on CFNY, while the singles "Rebound" and "Carrie" reached No. 97 and No. 78 respectively on the RPM charts in 1979 and 1980.

In 1978, the band was shaken by the suicide of André Paiement.

The following year, the band was profiled in the National Film Board documentary, CANO, Notes on a Collective Experience.

Spirit of the North, a compilation issued in 1980, traced CANO's integration of pop, rock and jazz influences into what was originally a folk-based style. In the same year, some of the band's music appeared in the documentary film, A Wives' Tale (Une histoire de femmes), on the 1978 Inco strike in Sudbury.

Following the departure of Rachel Paiement in 1980, the band released the album, Camouflage, under the band name Masque; it was the band's only fully English-language album. Kohut died of a cerebral hemorrhage in 1981, just weeks after the album's release, and was replaced by Ben Mink. By this time, the band was based in Toronto.

CITY-TV used a track by the band as its theme song for Great Movies in the 1980s, and the band also recorded music for several National Film Board productions.

In 1984, Aymar, Burt, Mink, Mary Lu Zahalan and Rob Yale recorded the band's final album, Visible, and played concerts in Ontario, Quebec, and Japan before disbanding.

== Revival ==
In 2003, Universal Music Canada released a CANO greatest hits compilation as part of its 20th Century Masters series.

The band released Rendezvous on the iTunes platform in summer 2008 and Eclipse in spring 2009.

CANO gave a reunion show at the 2010 La Nuit sur l'étang festival, with Monique Paiement—André and Rachel's younger sister—on lead vocals.

Celebrating 35 years of CANO in 2011, Aymar, Burt, Doerr, Dasti and Kendel reunited again in June 2011 for a series of concerts in Ottawa, North Bay, Sturgeon Falls and Kapuskasing, with Michel Bénac of Swing, Monique Paiement, Andrea Lindsay and Stéphane Paquette as supporting musicians. The Ottawa concert was recorded for broadcast on TFO.

== Legacy ==
CANO was involved in the creation of two music festivals in Sudbury, the bilingual folk festival Northern Lights Festival Boréal and the Franco-Ontarian cultural festival La Nuit sur l'étang. Both festivals continue to operate today.

In 2021, two classic CANO songs from the band's first album, André Paiement's "Dimanche après-midi" and Marcel Aymar's "Baie Sainte-Marie," were inducted into the Canadian Songwriters Hall of Fame.

== Discography ==
- 1976 - Tous dans l'même bateau
- 1977 - Au nord de notre vie
- 1978 - Eclipse
- 1979 - Rendezvous
- 1980 - Spirit of the North
- 1981 - Camouflage (as Masque)
- 1985 - Visible
- 2003 - The Best of CANO (20th Century Masters)
