= Rachel Paiement =

Canadian musician and songwriter (born 1955)

- Born: 1955 (age 70–71); Sturgeon Falls, Ontario, Canada
- Genres: pop, progressive jazz, folk
- Occupations: Singer, songwriter
- Formerly of: CANO

Rachel Claire Paiement (born 1955) is a Canadian musician and songwriter. She is best known as a former member, singer and songwriter for the Franco-Ontarian band CANO. Paiement left the band in 1980 and moved to Vancouver. She also appeared in theatre productions and as a guest musician on albums by other artists.

== Career ==
Paiement was a singer and songwriter for the Franco-Ontarian 1970s progressive rock band CANO (Co-operative Artistique du Nouvel Ontario) along with her brother André Paiement, drummer Michel Dasti, vocalist and guitarist Marcel Aymar, and guitarist David Burt, as well as Michael Kendel, John Doerr, and Wasyl Kohut.

Before CANO, Paiement performed with the group Morgan.

After her brother's passing in January 1978, Paiement and Aymar provided the group's vocals. Paiement left CANO in 1980 and moved to Vancouver.

In 1985, she wrote the French verse for the charity song "Tears Are Not Enough"; the english lyrics being written by Vallance and David Foster. She also appeared as a guest musician on albums by Bruce Cockburn, Paul Hyde , Michel Rivard and others. She appeared in theatre productions for the Théâtre du Nouvel-Ontario and worked as a session singer in Vancouver for many years.

In 1986, Paiement played again in Vancouver at the Arts Club Theatre on Granville Island.

When CANO reunited at the 2010 La Nuit sur l'étang festival in Sudbury, Paiement did not join them. Instead, her sister Monique appeared as the band's female vocalist.

== Personal life ==
Paiement married Vallance, who is also a songwriter and best known as the songwriting partner of Bryan Adams. She and Vallance have a son, Jimmy, born in 1989, who is a member of music duo Bob Moses.
