= Robert Paquette =

Canadian folk singer-songwriter (born 1949)

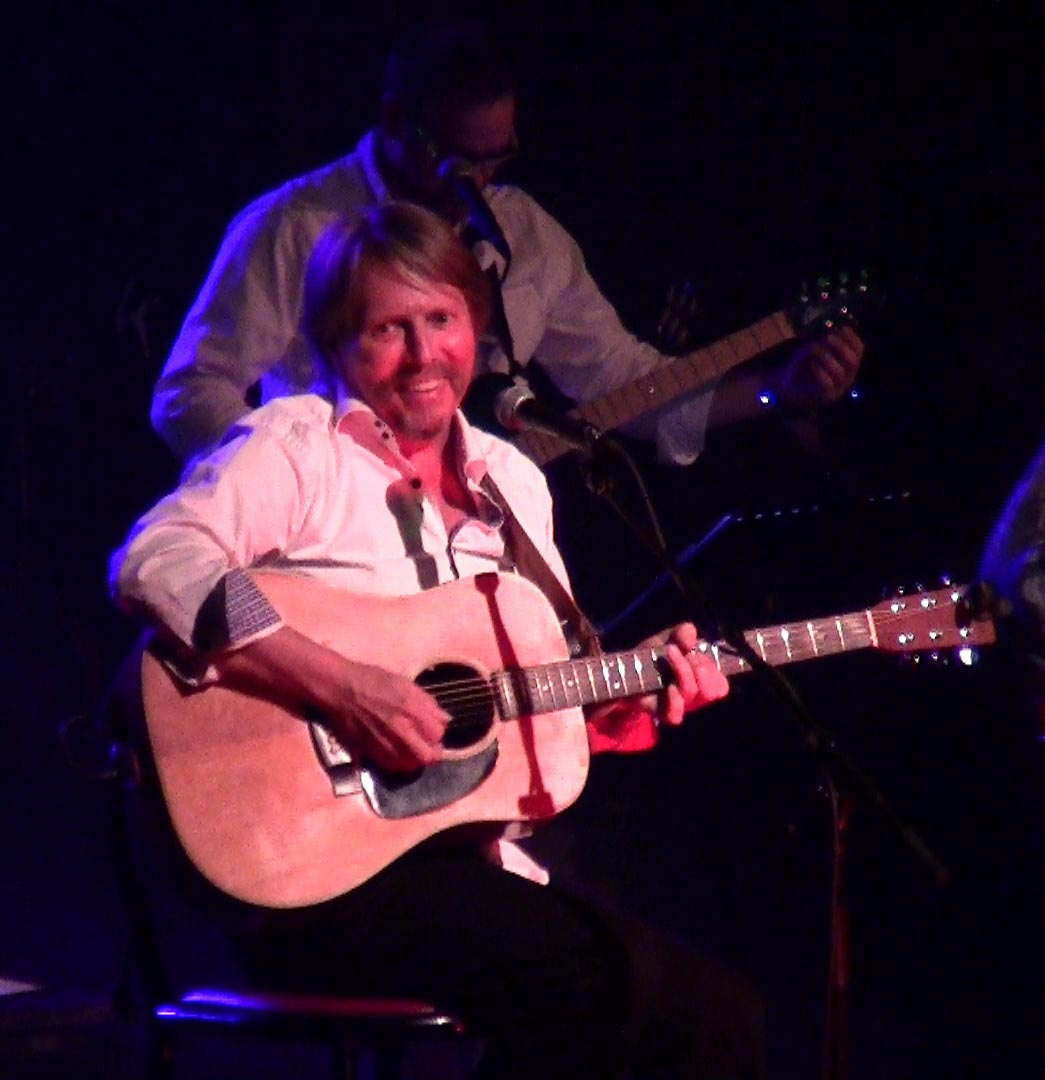
- Paquette at La Nuit sur l'étang, in March 2013.

Background information
- Born: July 2, 1949 (age 76); Sudbury, Ontario, Canada
- Genres: Folk
- Occupation: Singer-songwriter

Robert Paquette (born July 2, 1949) is a Canadian folk singer-songwriter.

In 1970, he worked with the student theatre group at Laurentian University, composing songs for the Franco-Ontarian stage musical Moé, j'viens du nord, 'stie! The troupe, which was one of the creative initiatives of the CANO artistic movement, evolved into the Théâtre du Nouvel-Ontario.

Paquette released his first album as a soloist in 1974, and toured Canada and the United States. He performed at the National Arts Centre in Ottawa in 1975. In 1978, Paquette represented Canada at the Festival de Spa in Belgium.

Following his 1984 album Gare à vous, Paquette concentrated on television and stage work for TVOntario's Chaîne française, SRC and the Théâtre du Nouvel-Ontario. He released a compilation of his songs in 1995. He toured with Marcel Aymar and Paul Demers in the 1990s as the performing group Paquette-Aymar-Demers. He also has collaborated with singer-songwriter Chuck Labelle.

Paquette helped to found the Association des professionnels de la chanson et de la musique, of which he was also the vice-president for 12 years; in 2001, he was the recipient of the association's Prix hommage at its first Gala Trille Or. That same year, his songs "Blanc et bleu," from the album Prends celui qui passe, and "Jamaica," from Au pied du courant, received SOCAN Classic awards.

In 2018, "Bleu et Blanc" was inducted into the Canadian Songwriters Hall of Fame.

== Discography ==
- Dépêche-toi soleil (1974)
- Prends celui qui passe (1976)
- Au pied du courant (1978)
- Robert Paquette en Europe (1979)
- Paquette (1981)
- Gare à vous (1984)
- Moi j'viens du nord – compilation 1974–1990 (1995)
- Un Cadeau de Noël (1995, with Chuck Labelle)
- Noël encore une fois (2000, with Chuck Labelle)
- Noël en tout et partout (2006, with Chuck Labelle)
