= Place des Arts (Sudbury) =

French Canadian arts centre in Sudbury, Ontario

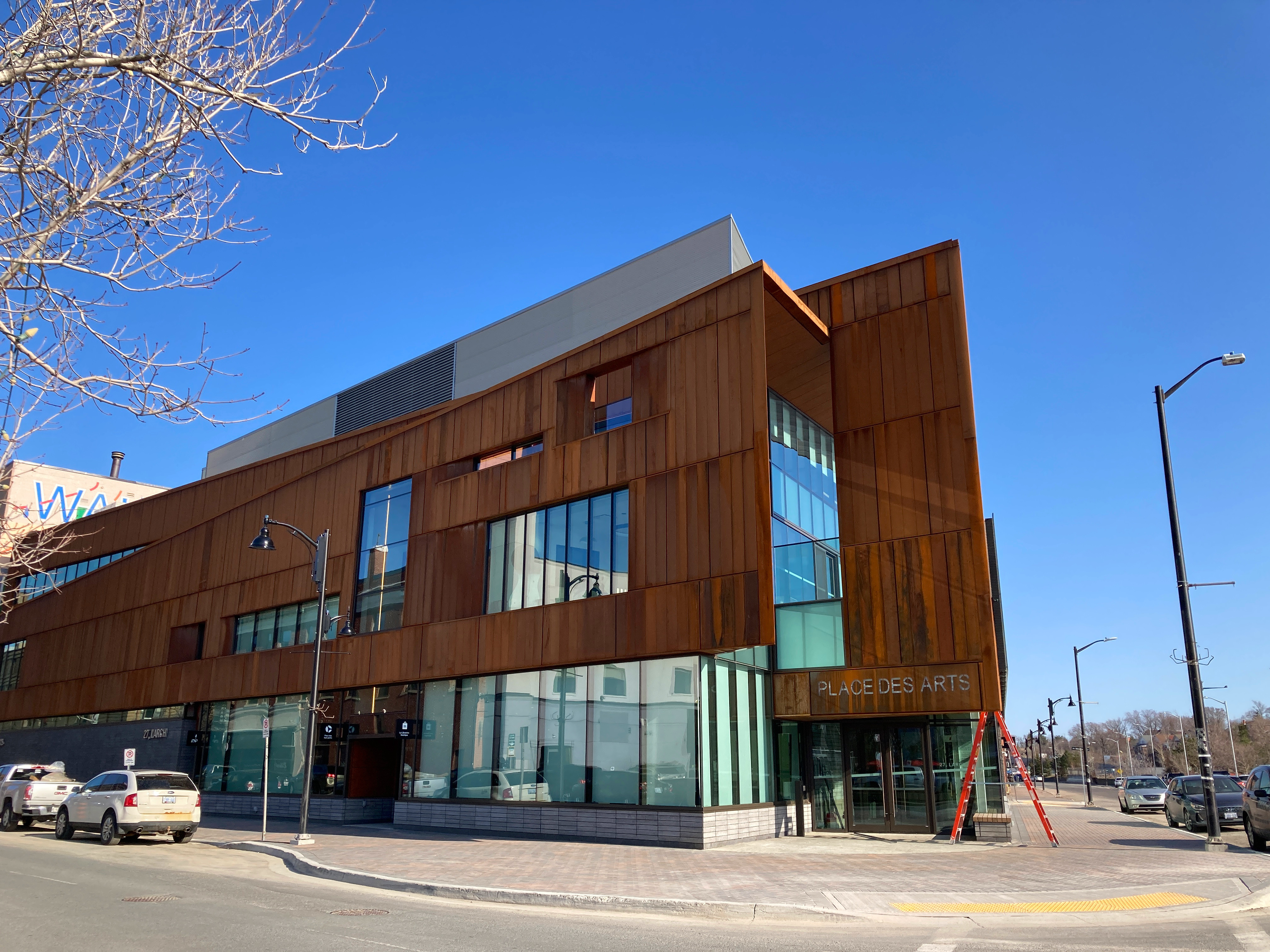
- Established: April 29, 2022
- Location: 27 Larch Street; Sudbury, Ontario; P3E 1B7
- Coordinates: 46°29′28″N 80°59′43″W
- Type: Arts centre
- Visitors: 40,000 (2025)
- Executive director: Denis Bertrand
- President: René Lapierre
- Architects: Moriyama Teshima Architects, Bélanger Salach Architecture
- Owner: Regroupement des organismes culturels de Sudbury (ROCS)
- Website: maplacedesarts.ca (in French)

Place des Arts, also known as Place des Arts du Grand Sudbury, is a Franco-Ontarian arts centre in Greater Sudbury, Ontario, Canada. It houses the Regroupement des organismes culturels de Sudbury (ROCS), a group of seven francophone arts organizations. Place des Arts officially opened April 29, 2022.

The 40,000 square-foot building, designed by Moriyama Teshima Architects and Bélanger Salach Architecture, contains a 300-seat theatre, multi-use performance spaces, an art gallery, daycare and a library.

== Organizations ==
The arts centre houses the seven organizations comprising the Regroupement des organismes culturels de Sudbury (ROCS) (English: Sudbury Cultural Organizations Group).

=== Carrefour francophone de Sudbury ===
Carrefour francophone de Sudbury (English: Francophone Crossroads of Sudbury) is a francophone organization that operates eleven early childhood education centres in Greater Sudbury, including at Place des Arts.

=== Centre franco-ontarien de folklore ===
Centre franco-ontarien de folklore (French: Franco-Ontarian Folklore Centre) is a heritage organization involved in the preservation of Franco-Ontarian oral history and folklore. The organization was founded in 1960 by Germain Lemieux, who gathered material in the Sudbury region between 1948 and 1958 for the Société historique du Nouvel-Ontario.

=== Galerie du Nouvel-Ontario ===
La Galerie du Nouvel-Ontario (GNO) (English: Gallery of New-Ontario) is an art gallery founded in 1995 as the first francophone artist-run centre in Ontario. The gallery focuses primarily on contemporary art by Franco-Ontarian artists.

=== Théâtre du Nouvel-Ontario ===
Théâtre du Nouvel-Ontario (English: Theatre of New-Ontario) is a professional theatre company founded in 1971 by the Coopérative des artistes du Nouvel-Ontario (CANO), a group of artists including André Paiement, Marcel Aymar, Denis St-Jules and Robert Paquette. It evolved out of an association of students at Laurentian University who wrote and performed a Franco-Ontarian musical theatre show, Moé, j'viens du nord, 'stie!, in 1970. Other artists later to be associated with the company included Jean-Marc Dalpé, Brigitte Haentjens and Alex Tétreault. The company originally staged theatre productions at Laurentian's Fraser Auditorium until it acquired a former bakery on King Street in the Flour Mill neighbourhood of Sudbury, where it remained until building a new theatre on the grounds of Collège Boréal in the late 1990s.

=== La Nuit sur l'étang ===
La Nuit sur l'étang (English: Night on the Pond) is a music festival founded in 1973 by Fernand Dorais and a group of students from Laurentian University. The festival is a one night concert program of francophone musicians, including readings by poets and authors between performances. The festival includes a competition new and upcoming musicians, with the winner given a slot at the main event.

=== Éditions Prise de parole ===
Éditions Prise de parole (English: Speaking Out Publishing) is a book publisher of primarily but not exclusively francophone literature. The most successful title in the company's history is Doric Germain's novel La vengeance de l'orignal. In 1996, the firm was involved in the Federal Court of Canada case Prise de parole Inc v Guérin, éditeur Ltée, after another publishing company published unauthorized excerpts from La vengeance de l'orignal in an anthology for use in schools. The company moved into Place des Arts in 2022.

=== Salon du livre du Grand Sudbury ===
Salon du livre du Grand Sudbury (English: Greater Sudbury Book Fair) is an annual francophone literary festival and book fair. The festival hosts school workshops, panels, discussions and lectures.

== Architecture ==
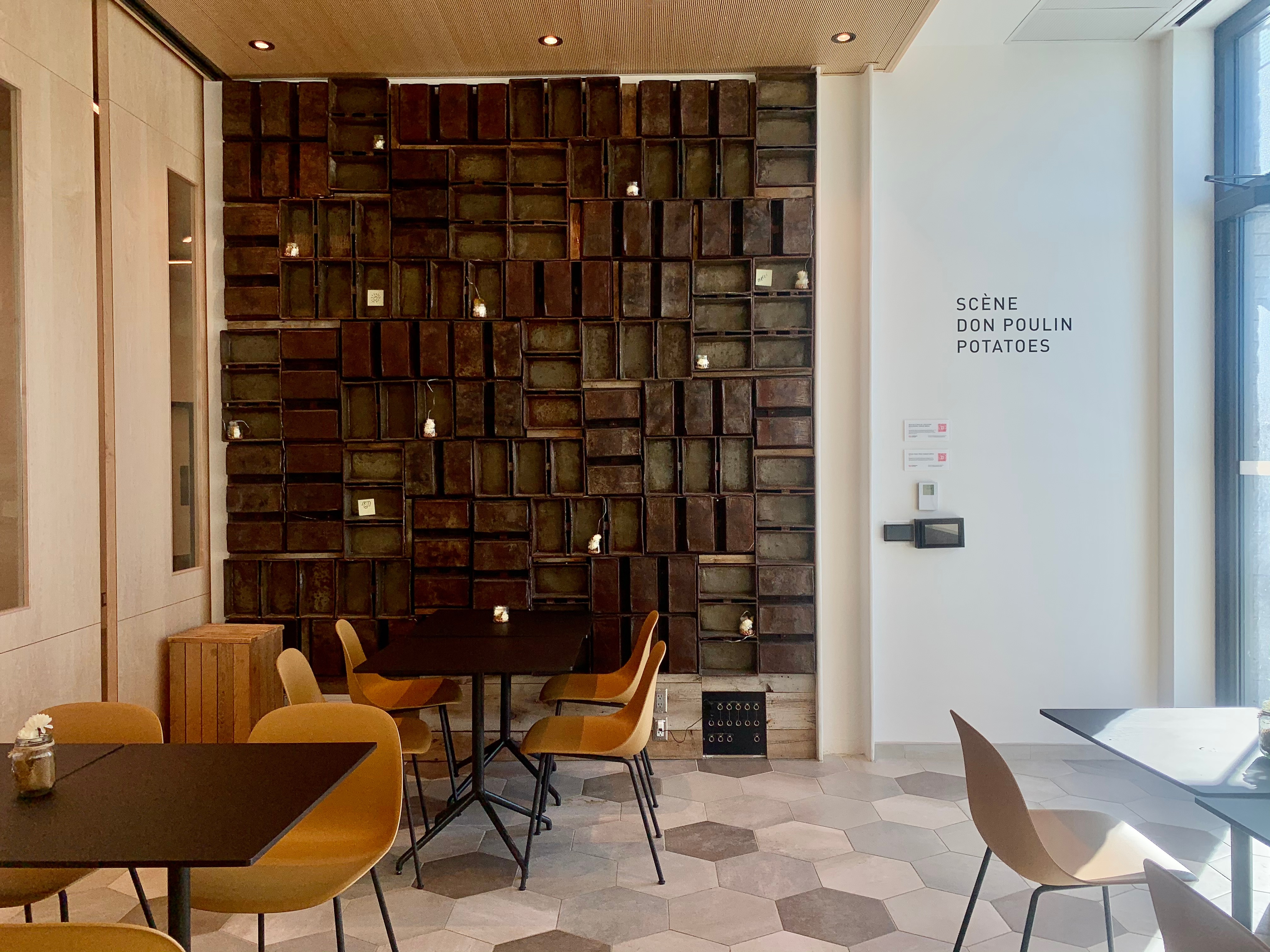
Bread pan wall at Place des Arts

The building was designed by at Moriyama & Teshima in association with Bélanger Salach. The exterior elements of the building reference of Sudbury's rail history with weathering steel panels, and the weathered appearance of the steel represents the different layers of rock formations found within the Sudbury Basin. The building incorporates historical artifacts that reference the Franco-Ontarian history of Sudbury. These include bread pans from a Canada Bread Bakery built in the 1940s, tin ceiling tiles from École Saint-Louis-de-Gonzague, student lockers from École Secondaire Macdonald-Cartier and stained glass from Collège Sacré-Coeur.

Construction began in 2018 and was completed in 2022. During construction, remnants of foundations from the King Edward Hotel were discovered and left in place below the new structure. Construction was anticipated to be completed by 2020, but was delayed due to the COVID-19 pandemic in Canada.

=== Awards ===
- 2022 Ontario Association of Architects (OAA) Queens Park Picks
- 2022 Architecture, Construction & Design Awards, Cultural (built)
- 2023 Urban Design and Architecture Design Awards, Gold Winner, Cultural Architecture (Built)
- 2023 Grand Prix du Design, Platinum Winner, Architecture, Special Prizes in Collaboration
