= 2021 Laurentian University financial crisis =

University insolvency in Ontario, Canada

2021–2022 Laurentian University
- Also known as: French: Crise à l'Université Laurentienne de 2021-22
- Participants: Laurentian University; Government of Ontario

The 2021–2022 Laurentian University Crisis is a controversial and unprecedented financial crisis at Laurentian University in Northern Ontario, Canada. After experiencing financial difficulties over a period of years, the university filed for creditor protection on February 1, 2021. The university subsequently closed 69 undergraduate and graduate programs and terminated 195 faculty and staff with little notice or severance. The federated universities of Laurentian eliminated 143 positions. Approximately 932 students were affected. It also marked the first time in Canadian history that a public university sought to restructure under the Companies' Creditors Arrangement Act (CCAA).

The crisis has provoked sharp criticism of both the university administration and the Premiership of Doug Ford as well as sparking discussion of the state of postsecondary education in Canada, including Indigenous and Franco-Ontarian education. Concerns have also been raised about the impact of the cuts on the cultural and economic life of Northern Ontario, with estimates predicting an economic cost of over $100 million to the city of Greater Sudbury.

The auditor general's final report from November 2022 acknowledged external factors in the crisis, but identified the primary cause of the crisis as the poorly planned capital expansions that were exacerbated by administrative bloat and weak board and provincial oversight. The report confirmed that the instigation of CCAA restructuring was strategically planned by the administration on the advice of external counsel, thus bypassing the collective agreement provisions with the faculty union regarding financial exigency.

== Restructuring process ==
On February 1, 2021, Laurentian University president Robert Haché confirmed that the university had filed for creditor protection. Court filings revealed that the university's liabilities amounted to $321 million, including $91 million in loans from three Canadian banks.

The university continued to offer 107 undergraduate programs and 33 graduate programs in the aftermath of the closures and terminations. The university indicated that "We anticipate that approximately 10 per cent of undergraduate students...will be affected in some way by these program adjustments."

As part of restructuring, the university announced that it was considering the sale of some of its real estate, including the last undeveloped waterfront on Sudbury's Lake Nepahwin. For the community response, see 2021 Laurentian University Financial Crisis § Public.

From 2014 to 2021, the university spent over $160 million on new infrastructure, with around $140 million of that total coming from government subsidies and private donations.

The president reported at the university senate in September that over $9.8 million had been expended on restructuring costs. The court-appointed monitor also had earlier indicated that the university would be spending nearly $10 million in additional costs by February 2022, as well as $1.8 million in interest loan fees on the debtor-in-possession loan from Firm Capital that was received through the CCAA insolvency process. The DIP loan was assumed by the provincial government on January 31 as part of its intervention, regarding which see 2021 Laurentian University Financial Crisis § Provincial government. As of May 1, 2022, restructuring costs were reported as $20.9 million, with an additional $3.9 million in charges related to the DIP loan. The monitor also projected there would be nearly $8 million in additional costs by September 30.

The court approved the university's request to extend restructuring several times.

Despite declaring insolvency on February 1, Laurentian University consulted with insolvency counsel at least as early as March 2020. On August 28, 2020, the Laurentian board of governors engaged the accounting firm Ernst and Young as a "financial advisor to assist LU in its restructuring efforts and if necessary, act as the Court-appointed Monitor...should LU decide to seek protection under the CCAA." Laurentian did not announce the hiring of Ernst and Young until October 1. In early November, the board's executive committee created an "a special In Camera Ad Hoc Committee on Contingency Planning" that was to provide oversight and direction for the CCAA process. On December 10, 2020, the university requested assistance from the government of Ontario, asking for $100 million, almost half of which would go toward ""termination and severance payments." Laurentian proposed that it could work with $30-$40 million, but that amount would not be enough to avoid entering the CCAA. The province replied that it could not offer $100 million unless Laurentian agreed to a third-party audit of the university's finances, but that it could offer $12 million to cover operations until the end of March. Apparently, the university administration declined both of these offers. The matter was commented upon in the auditor general's preliminary and final reports in April and November 2022. For the reports and reaction to them, see 2021 Laurentian University Financial Crisis § Provincial government.

In December, the court granted the university's request to remove the $500,000 cap on the legal fees of independent counsel for the Board of Governors. There also was approval for the appointment of three claims officers to deal with the approximately 1,500 claims from creditors for over $360 million, and a grievance resolution officer to address grievances filed by the Laurentian University Faculty Association.

On February 1, 2022, an interactive timeline of milestones in the restructuring process was published to mark the anniversary of the insolvency declaration.

At the February meeting of the Laurentian senate, the president indicated that in May the university expected to be able to ask the court for permission to convene a meeting with the creditors.

The publication in early March of the Nous report on university governance and operations, which the university had commissioned in the fall, met a critical reception. The university also reported a deficit of $65.9 million for the fiscal year 2020–21, while the cost of restructuring had reached $79.1 million.

In March, the university agreed, with reservations, to start responding to freedom-of-information requests effective May 1, following the intervention of the provincial information and privacy commissioner. Laurentian had obtained a stay from the court on the processing such requests at the commencement of the insolvency proceedings.

At the March senate meeting, the Nous report's recommendations on senate governance were debated. Several resolutions were passed affirming senate's traditional role.

The university filed its proposed plan of arrangement with the court on July 21, 2022. The pending "retirements" of president Robert Haché and provost Marie-Josée Berger were also announced. (The university senate later passed a non-confidence motion regarding the two administrators.) The filing revealed that over $38 million in restricted funds for scholarships, bursaries and other targeted donations was instead spent as general revenue during the university's spiral into insolvency. On July 28, the court ruled that a vote among the creditors would conclude on September 14 on whether to approve the debt repayment plan, which stipulated that the majority of creditors would be paid approximately 20 percent of what was owed to them over several years. A group of terminated faculty came out strongly against the plan, while the Laurentian University Faculty Association urged its members to withhold their vote so that its concerns, which included how the university would be governed in the future, could be addressed. Following negotiations, the faculty association, together with the Laurentian staff union and the university's board of governors, recommended that creditors vote for the plan. The plan's approval at the September 14 creditors' meeting was widely reported and commented upon.

Not including the cost of the province's intervention, restructuring costs totaled $26.1 million as of September 2022, including a $4.725 million bill from the insolvency monitor for the period January 1 to July 1, 2022.

At a hearing on October 5, the court approved the arrangement plan and extended the stay period to November 30.

The university posted a $16.8 million surplus for the fiscal year 2021–22.

Haché, appointed in 2019, was fired by the Board of Governors and left the university on October 31, 2022; Berger was fired as well, and left shortly thereafter. Two former administrators from other Ontario universities were subsequently named interim president and provost effective January 1, 2023.

After 22 months, the university emerged from CCAA restructuring on November 28, 2022.

== Program cuts ==
The university closed 58 undergraduate degree programs, of which 34 were English-language programs and 24 were French-language. It also cut 11 graduate programs, which was about one-quarter of the university's graduate offerings. Programs with historically low enrolments were targeted.

=== Arts ===
Arts degrees were among the programs eliminated, including several languages, philosophy, music, and the French-language history program. The program closures drew significant concern from the community about the impact it would have on local culture, as many local arts institutions and festivals had ties to the university.

=== Midwifery ===
Laurentian was one of the three Ontario universities that offered an undergraduate program in midwifery, and the only university outside of the province of Québec that offered the degree in French (and the only bilingual program in Canada). Despite receiving 400 applications each year for the 30 spots in the program, midwifery was canceled, even though the province was facing a shortage of midwives. Some commentators also raised concerns about the impact of the cuts on regional healthcare in Northern Ontario, while others raised concerns about the impact on women. However, in appearing before a federal parliamentary committee, Robert Haché testified that the province's funding was insufficient to sustain the program.

In April, the provincial government announced that it intended to ensure the continuation of a bilingual midwifery program. The government had previously stated that it would redistribute the funding Laurentian received to the midwifery programs at Ryerson University (now Toronto Metropolitan University) and McMaster University. In May, the Ontario Midwifery Consortium announced that it had received temporary funding from the province for Ryerson and McMaster to train virtually the Laurentian transfer students and oversee their placements.

The abolition of the French-language program was a topic of the report published in March 2022 of the Ontario commissioner for French-language services, who found that the university and the province violated Ontario's French Language Services Act. See also 2021 Laurentian University Financial Crisis § Franco-Ontarians.

=== Science ===
Nobel Prize laureate Arthur B. McDonald, a former director of SNOLAB, criticised the elimination of the university's programs in physics and mathematics, noting that Laurentian was a founding member of the SNOLAB and that the loss of new students could significantly impact astrophysics research in Sudbury. Other programs that were cut included radiation therapy, ecology, and environmental science, despite the university having been the driving force behind Greater Sudbury's internationally recognised regreening program.

=== Sports ===
In mid-April, the university announced it was cutting its varsity swimming and hockey programs for both women and men. Even if usual U Sports transfer rules would be suspended for the affected student athletes, this still created a situation of uncertainty surrounding their athletic scholarships. Voyageurs men's hockey head coach Craig Duncanson stated that "we were told we fiscally made sense, because if you take the hockey program, there's 30 students at the university who wouldn't be there, so you're taking people out who are taking up empty chairs," while women's hockey head coach Stacey Colarossi criticized the university for continuing to recruit players into March 2021, stating that "it gave our women's athletes a false sense of hope, especially since it came out so late."

Members of the university's swimming program expressed concern over the university's transparency, as they had raised over $8,000 in December for the university's Olympic pool and athletics centre, but were unable to track how the funds were expended.

=== Animal euthanasia controversy ===
As part of the cuts, the university closed its Animal Care Facility. The closure meant that several hundred animals in the lab's care, mostly mice and rats used for medical research, were to be euthanized. The announcement provoked public controversy, with animal rights' advocates calling for the university to send the animals to shelters instead. The university defended its actions, stating that "these research activities will be wound down under the oversight of a veterinarian following animal welfare guidelines in accordance with the Canadian Council on Animal Care and the Ontario Ministry of Agriculture and Food and Rural Affairs." However, students involved in the research also criticized the university, with one telling CBC News that:

The time of their death was much sooner than it should have been, and there was no research gained from the death. One of the whole reasons we sort of justify using animals in research is because there's an end to the means and there's a reason we're doing that research. And almost always it's for the conservation of other species. I had all these animals that would have resulted in really important research that could have conserved other amphibians. And instead none of that research could have been gained and they had to be euthanized before any data could have been collected.

== Federated and affiliated universities and colleges ==
As part of its restructuring, the university moved to end its partnership with the three other federated universities — University of Sudbury, Thorneloe University, and Huntington University — claiming that it would save over $7 million a year. However, two of the federated universities fought the Laurentian decision in court. Ronald Caza, a lawyer representing the University of Sudbury, accused Laurentian of acting in bad faith and of attempting to destroy the federated universities, claiming Laurentian saw them as competitors. Court documents suggested that Thorneloe University was at risk of going bankrupt if its relationship to Laurentian was severed. A harbinger of the Laurentian crisis had been Thorneloe's abrupt shutdown in 2020 of its theatre and motion picture arts' programs due to financial pressures.

On May 2, 2021, the Ontario Superior Court of Justice cleared Laurentian to cut its ties with the federated universities. As a result, they closed their respective undergraduate programs which, with the exception of gerontology, were taught in the faculty of arts. The programs included ancient studies, communication studies, études journalistiques (taught in the French language), folklore et ethnologie (taught in the French language), gerontology, Indigenous studies, philosophy, religious studies, and women, gender, and sexuality studies. Huntington's online gerontology program was taken over by Laurentian, as were six courses in Indigenous studies that had been taught at the University of Sudbury. However, none of the faculty were transferred. Altogether, 28 full-time faculty members were terminated on June 30, including 7 at Huntington, 7 at Thorneloe, and 14 at the University of Sudbury. Thorneloe's overall staff complement went from 40 employees to 4. A $9.8 million claim against Laurentian has also been filed by Thorneloe.

The University of Sudbury had indicated in March 2021 that it was undergoing consultations with l'Assemblée de la francophonie de l'Ontario to become a fully autonomous, francophone university. In February 2022, the Coalition nord-ontarienne pour une universite de langue française struck a committee of experts "to develop recommendations on the mandate and mission of a new French-language university for the mid-North, to be created under the auspices of the Université de Sudbury." In April, the federal government gave $1.9 million for a feasibility study to be submitted in support of the institution's application to the province for funding toward that end. See also 2021 Laurentian University Financial Crisis § Franco-Ontarians, 2021 Laurentian University Financial Crisis § Indigenous communities and 2021 Laurentian University Financial Crisis § Public.

The institutions affiliated with Laurentian included the Northern Ontario School of Medicine and l'Université de Hearst. In mid-April 2021, the provincial government announced that it was introducing legislation to allow them to become fully independent, degree-granting institutions. This would notably make l'Université de Hearst the second fully-francophone university in the province to receive an independent charter, after l'Université de l'Ontario français. The school of medicine's dean commented that the school had not been consulted on the government's decision and expressed concern about the status of the institution's funding since $20 million of its funds were deposited at Laurentian at the time of the insolvency declaration. Nevertheless, the legislation was subsequently passed. At a November town hall, the Northern Ontario School of Medicine stated that $14 million in bursary funds had been directed to Laurentian before the insolvency, but there was no indication as to their status. On April 1, 2022, the independence of NOSM and Hearst universities was proclaimed. The subsequent plan of arrangement between Laurentian University and its creditors indicated that $14.6 million in endowed funds was to be returned to NOSM University.

Laurentian University partners with several Ontario colleges to accredit students with undergraduate degrees. In October 2021, St. Lawrence College announced it was no longer partnering with Laurentian University to grant 4-year nursing degrees. Instead it was taking advantage of an Ontario initiative that allowed colleges to grant standalone nursing degrees. St. Lawrence continues to offer a joint Bachelor of Business Administration degree through Laurentian.

== Impact ==
=== Students ===
The scale of the cuts, including the elimination of degree programs, left many students with deep uncertainty about the state of their studies. Some were unable to complete their degree at Laurentian due to the necessary courses having been cut, and had to transfer to other universities.

Commentators expressed concern that there could be a mass exodus of francophone students in particular. Concerns were also raised about international students, especially as they paid significantly higher tuition fees than domestic students. The loss of their degree programs could also potentially raise issues for international students concerning their visa status.

Although enrolment in the spring 2021 term was not affected, there was a 33 percent decline in the enrolment for the first-year class for the fall 2021 term. In November, the university announced that the overall enrolment had declined by 14 percent.

In January 2022, a precipitous decline of 43.5 percent in enrolment applications for the fall 2022 term was reported, with applications for programs in the French language falling by 52 percent.

Students mourned the loss of their programs as the February 1 anniversary of the insolvency declaration arrived.

The Canadian Federation of Students, including its Ontario branch, condemned the cuts. The Ontario branch also contributed to the events held April 11–14, 2022, to mark the anniversary of the day (April 12, 2021) when the cuts were announced.

The preliminary fall 2022 enrolment figures indicated that an upsurge in applications from international, mature and transfer students was offset by a decline from Ontario high school students. Overall, applications fell 1.7 percent.

The Laurentian Student General Association (the principal body for anglophone students) made no public statement on the insolvency. However, in September 2022, following approval of the plan of arrangement with the university's creditors, the association unveiled a "sculpture" that it had commissioned to show commitment to environmental sustainability and university renewal.

=== Faculty and staff ===
The university's collective agreement with the faculty provided for severance to be paid to terminated members based on years of service. However, the Companies' Creditors Arrangement Act process superseded the agreement, leaving many of the terminated faculty in a precarious state. In April, the faculty members ratified a new collective agreement that included salary concessions and rollbacks. The Laurentian University Faculty Association president said the contract was signed under duress, with the board of governors threatening to shut down the university if the agreement was not ratified. The association condemned the cuts and, with the Ontario Confederation of University Faculty Associations and the Canadian Association of University Teachers, called for the resignations of the university's senior leadership as well as the province's minister of colleges and universities. At the end of July, the faculty association filed a claim against the insurance that covers the senior administration and board of governors from litigation. The claim alleges the misuse and loss of earmarked funds including the retiree health benefit plan, research funds, professional allowance, and loss of sabbatical credits for terminated faculty members.

The Greater Sudbury City Council announced plans to provide assistance to Laurentian staff whose positions had been eliminated by helping their search for employment in the region.

The terminations of the faculty members took place on April 30 and May 15. There is no published information on how many were able to find employment in the region or elsewhere. It does appear, however, that the majority of them were in the mid- to late stages of their careers.

At the December meeting of the university senate, the administration was accused of misleading the Laurentian University Staff Union in the 2020 renegotiation of its collective agreement that resulted in pay cuts. LUSU also gave $450,000 of its funds to the university so that its members would not have to take unpaid furlough days. The union said it was not notified at the time that the university was in consultation with external insolvency counsel. The university president responded that there was a reference to it in the initial affidavit of the university's insolvency filing. However, the only public reference to Laurentian seeking external insolvency counsel in March 2020 appeared to be in documents related to the speaker's warrant issued through the Ontario legislature on December 9 (see 2021 Laurentian University Financial Crisis § Provincial government).

According to the Laurentian faculty association, the overall number of full-time faculty members at the university fell from 400 to 250, and from 300 part-time to 200.

The anniversary of the insolvency saw the launch of a website to celebrate former faculty and staff members of the Laurentian federation. A former faculty member also published his performance of "YIGO," a song about the insolvency's devastating impact.

=== Franco-Ontarians ===
The crisis was characterised as a Black Monday for the Franco-Ontarian community, with Théâtre du Nouvel-Ontario manager Marie-Pierre Proulx stating that "we don't have any other choice but to take it personally, as an attack on our culture and our situation." Senator Josée Forest-Niesing stated that "the Francophone minority community in Northern Ontario depends on Laurentian University for its development, support and future."

Over 60 percent of the university's French-language programs were affected by the cuts, a disproportionate number compared to the English-language programs. This came despite the university's official status as bilingual and its status under the French Language Services Act. Kelly Burke, the province's French Language Commissioner, released a statement in April that she was reviewing the situation after receiving criticism over her earlier silence.

The university's pledge to continue its bilingual status was met with skepticism among Franco-Ontarians, with Joanne Gervais, executive director of L'Association Canadienne-Francaise de l'Ontario, calling for the university to "explain how you cut 60 per cent of your French programming and still expect us to accept you or think of you as an ally or somebody there to serve our community." The Regroupement étudiant Franco-ontarien announced that it would be fighting the cuts, stating that "francophone communities are always disproportionately affected by austerity measures in bilingual institutions."

On April 23, Carol Jolin, president of the Francophone Assembly of Ontario, appeared before the federal parliament's Standing Committee on Official Languages, criticising the university's lack of transparency on how it had been spending federal funding aimed at supporting French-language programs in Canada.

Some commentators called for a rethink in how French-language education is offered in Ontario, with some proposing the creation of a federation of French-language universities. In November, a petition was read in the Ontario legislature urging that all Laurentian programs taught in the French language be transferred to the University of Sudbury.

The government of Ontario had previously been criticised by the Franco-Ontarian community for a series of cuts in late 2018, including the elimination of funding for the Université de l'Ontario français and the elimination of the French Language Services Commissioner, in what was dubbed "Black Thursday" for the community. Those previous, as well as the crisis, contributed to a sense of unease surrounding the future of the Franco-Ontarian community and francophones communities elsewhere in Canada, with one columnist for Le Soleil using the term "francodéprime" to describe the situation.

In a report published on March 31, 2022, the Ontario French-language services' commissioner determined that both the university and the province had contravened the French Language Services Act. The commissioner had announced the investigation into the university's cuts to French-language programs in June 2021.

=== Indigenous communities ===
The crisis provoked serious concerns about the future of Indigenous education and research in Northern Ontario. The Indigenous Studies program taught at the University of Sudbury was the second oldest in Canada when it was shut down in 2021.

The Laurentian University Native Education Council stated that it had been excluded from discussions surrounding the future of the university, with former chair Roxane Manitowabi stating that "Indigenous Studies needs to continue in our community and students deserve to be educated in the north."

Some commentators accused the university of breaking national commitments to reconciliation with Indigenous peoples, notably the Truth and Reconciliation Commission of Canada's call for adequate funding for Indigenous education.

Other commentators accused the university of misleading Indigenous communities over the future status of language revitalisation programs. The University of Sudbury reached an agreement to provide six Indigenous Studies courses over the summer for students who needed the credits to graduate, but Laurentian was criticized when the course teaching positions were not offered to the University of Sudbury professors who had been scheduled to teach them. The spring session courses were eventually taught by Trent University faculty and former faculty members of the University of Sudbury.

In October, the University of Sudbury and Kenjgewin Teg, an Indigenous education institute located on Manitoulin Island, announced the transfer of the intellectual property of some of the university's online courses in Indigenous studies to the institute. Kenjgewin Teg also indicated it intended to develop Indigenous Studies programming as well as open a University of Sudbury campus.

== Reaction ==
=== Public ===
Media coverage and commentary on the crisis has been massive, with over 1,600 news reports, opinion pieces, articles, blog postings, and radio and television broadcasts, according to a listing that has been compiled. The local media outlets have included CBC Radio Sudbury, CTV News Northern Ontario, Le Voyageur/La Voix du Nord, Radio-Canada, Sudbury.com, and the Sudbury Star. CTV News and Radio-Canada have provided folders of their ongoing news coverage, as has Le Devoir.

Much of the reaction has focused on concerns around how the cuts would affect Northern Ontario, such as the impact on women and Indigenous and francophone communities. Other commentators expressed concerns about the state of postsecondary education across the country, noting that similar problems could occur elsewhere.

The root causes of the crisis have also been analyzed. Themes include poor management, declining enrolment, academic capitalism, and the neoliberal university. Structural issues surrounding the Northern Ontario economy and the decline of public funding for education are also discussed.

Former university administrators weighed in, while others defended the CCAA process.

Donors to the university expressed dismay about the lack of transparency on the disposition of their funds.

Another area of concern was the status of the university's research grants when it was learned that the funds were co-mingled with operating funds. Federal granting agencies subsequently filed claims against Laurentian for more than $7 million.

At the end of February, the Greater Sudbury City Council voted to write to the provincial government to ask for funds to stabilize the university and to review the funding model for the university sector.

In a joint letter, the Canadian Historical Association and the Institut d'histoire de l'Amérique française condemned the cuts and underlined that Laurentian was "a driving force for regional development and the heart of the Franco-Ontarian community in Mid-Northern Ontario." Other scholarly societies also wrote letters.

On April 14, the National Assembly of Quebec voted unanimously to denounce the Laurentian cuts as well as the underfunding of francophone institutions across Canada.

Also in mid-April, university chancellor Steve Paikin resigned. A successor was not named and no honorary doctorates were conferred at the university's spring convocation in June. In protest against the cuts, Franco-Ontarian writer Jean-Marc Dalpé renounced the honorary doctorate that was conferred to him by the university in 2002.

Université de Moncton president Denis Prud'homme expressed concern that what had happened at Laurentian could occur elsewhere in Canada, putting minority groups at risk. Patrick Noël, vice-president of the Manitoba Organization of Faculty Associations, echoed the concern, stating that action was needed in the near future.

On International Workers' Day (May 1, 2021), a demonstration against the cuts was organized by the Sudbury Workers Education and Advocacy Centre. A handful of solidarity demonstrations was also held in other Ontario centres.

The prospect of a sell-off of the university's greenspace sparked strong community concern.

The indefinite closure of the university's Jeno Tihanyi Olympic Gold Pool, which occurred in the weeks before the insolvency declaration, also raised concern regarding the future of community swimming programs. In July 2022, the Sudbury mayor indicated the city may intervene to save the facility in the event that it was put up for sale.

There were reports in April 2022 that the Art Gallery of Sudbury's assets worth $6.39 million were at risk being sold as part of the insolvency proceedings.

Among the local groups with campaigns are Save Our Sudbury, Laurentian Nordic Ski Club, Nepahwin Lake Watershed Stewardship, and the Coalition for a Liveable Sudbury.

The Tricultural Committee for University Education at Sudbury, an offshoot of Save Our Sudbury, has urged that the university be placed in trusteeship with separate funds for Indigenous and Francophone institutions. The committee organized a teach-in and skate-in on Ramsey Lake in Sudbury to mark the anniversary of the insolvency declaration. With the Ontario branch of the Canadian Federation of Students, it also organized events held April 11–14 on the anniversary of Black Monday (April 12, 2021), when the cuts to programs and staff were announced. A tricultural committee member was among the speakers at the May Day gathering in downtown Sudbury's Memorial Park. The committee opposed the plan of arrangement between the university and its creditors and called instead for a public inquiry.

=== Provincial government ===
The Ford government and its policies on postsecondary education were a focus of criticism, particularly for its funding cuts and the appointment of Progressive Conservative party supporters to university boards. The government was also criticized for its failure to respond to the Laurentian crisis. The few statements of Ross Romano, who was then the minister of colleges and universities, mostly supported the university's cuts. As part of the CCAA proceedings, the courts denied a motion to release correspondence between the province and the university prior to the insolvency declaration. The province also provided no Covid-related emergency funding to Laurentian when funding was extended to other colleges and universities.

In February, the province commissioned Alan Harrison as special adviser to support the university. The term of the position was subsequently extended as part of the government's intervention (see below).

Labour leaders condemned the government for its inaction, including Tara Maszczakiewicz, regional vice-president of the Ontario Public Service Employees Union, who stated that "Mr. Ford and Mr. Romano choose to view a public post-secondary institution as a business. They are putting the first nail in the coffin of post-secondary education in Ontario." The Ontario Confederation of University Faculty Associations called for Romano's resignation as minister, claiming that he was aware of the issues facing the university months before the crisis became public, yet chose not to take action. The university president also indicated that both provincial and federal officials had been informed of Laurentian's financial problems over the past year. The minister was subsequently replaced in a June cabinet shuffle.

In April, Auditor General of Ontario Bonnie Lysyk was asked to investigate the university's finances over the past decade following a motion passed by the provincial legislative assembly's standing committee on public accounts. The university refused to provide documents to the auditor general that it considered to be privileged. The dispute was referred to the Superior Court for resolution. In a report, the auditor general said the university was creating a climate of fear among its employees that inhibited disclosure. While the court reserved a decision, the Ontario legislature approved a speaker's warrant that ordered the university (over its protest) to hand over the documents to the public accounts committee. In speaking in favour of issuing the warrant, Paul Calandra, the government house leader, chastised Laurentian president Robert Haché and board of governors' chair Claude Lacroix, stating that their "utter disrespect for Parliament and the people of Ontario is shameful and we will not let it stand." The university asked the Superior Court to suspend the warrant. In January, the court ruled in favour of the university that it was not obligated to disclose privileged documents to the auditor general. At a separate hearing held on the university's request to stay the warrant, the court ordered the university to release all materials requisitioned by the committee save the ones under court order. Altogether, 3.8 million documents were subsequently received. Sudbury MPPs Jamie West and France Gélinas subsequently introduced (then reintroduced, following the June provincial election) legislation that would prohibit public institutions from challenging the auditor general's power to access privileged or confidential documents.

On December 16, the province intervened by taking over the $35 million loan from Firm Capital, the debtor-in-possession lender, providing $6 million in COVID-19 related relief, and up to $22 million to cover enrolment declines and performance target failures. The support was contingent on "board governance strategy" that resulted in the resignations of the chair, vice-chair, past chair, and eight others. Five appointments from the business and corporate sector were subsequently announced. An interim board chair was appointed and, on the anniversary of the insolvency declaration, both the Laurentian president and the minister of college and universities published open letters. In March 2022, provincial legislation was passed that reduced the size of the board of governors from 25 to 16. In April, the appointment of interim board chair Jeff Bangs was extended to June 30, 2023, and further resignations and appointments to the board were announced. In October, it was reported that the province's financial aid was contingent on the Laurentian president stepping down.

The auditor general's preliminary report in April caused a stir and received wide commentary. The report concluded that the university had refused provincial funds that would have prevented the program cuts and instead chose to file for creditor protection.

Published in November 2022, the auditor general's final report painted a compelling, troubling portrait of the administrative and financial failure. Although external factors were acknowledged, the primary cause of the crisis was found to be poorly planned capital expansions that were exacerbated by administrative bloat and weak board and provincial oversight. The report confirmed that the instigation of CCAA restructuring was strategically planned by the administration on the advice of external counsel, thus bypassing the collective agreement provisions with the faculty union regarding financial exigency. Contrary to the administration's claim, academic salaries were found to be inline with sector norms and the programs had been a net benefit to the university. In noting the $30.1 million cost of restructuring, the auditor general asked whether the funds might better have been spent on education. The report's findings, which also called attention to the lack of transparency in board governance, the employment of lobbyists, and special deals for administrators, brought a furious response from terminated faculty and renewed the call of the Canadian Association of University Teachers for legislation to prohibit public postsecondary institutions from CCAA restructuring.

Correspondence between the university and the province in the runup to the insolvency declaration that had previously been sealed by the courts was released in late November. In addition to confirming the auditor general's findings, the documents shed further light on the factors and motivation that underpinned the university's application to the courts for CCAA restructuring as well as the consultation with the ministry. The revelation renewed calls for a public inquiry.

=== Federal parliament ===
Mélanie Joly, who was then the federal minister of economic development and official languages, criticized the provincial government's inaction, stating that it was avoiding its responsibilities. The province responded that the federal government only asked to meet after the program cuts and layoffs were announced. In late April, the federal government indicated its willingness to provide funding to help resolve the situation, in particular to support French language and Francophone education in Ontario.

Paul Lefebvre, who was then the Liberal MP for Sudbury, proposed a private member's bill that would ban colleges and universities from seeking creditor protection, stating that "what has happened here at Laurentian University cannot be repeated anywhere else across the country." However, the bill was not passed into law.

Lindsay Mathyssen, federal New Democratic Party critic for women and gender equality, called for a study on the loss of the Laurentian midwifery program.

Timmins-James Bay MP Charlie Angus (NDP) was granted an emergency debate in the House of Commons, where he condemned the cuts and called for the resignations of the Laurentian president and board of governors, stating that they "should not be allowed near any public institutions, and not public education." In late April, members of both the federal and provincial New Democratic Party held a town hall with federal NDP leader Jagmeet Singh in attendance.

The Laurentian crisis was a topic of local and regional debate in the 2021 Canadian federal election, with a former Laurentian professor running as the Sudbury NDP candidate. However, the two Sudbury area seats were retained by the Liberals.

In 2021, a bill was introduced in the Canadian Senate regarding the financial stability of postsecondary institutions that would bar governing boards from resorting to the CCAA as well as the Bankruptcy and Insolvency Act.The standing senate committee's evidentiary meeting on the bill took place in October 2022. Officials from the Ontario Confederation of University Faculty Associations and the Canadian Association of University Teachers spoke in support of the legislation; the latter had commissioned a legal brief on the Laurentian insolvency. A similar bill was introduced in the House of Commons in November. The federal government signaled its intention to amend the legislation in its fall economic statement of November 2023. The amendments were included in Bill C-59, which passed third reading and received royal assent on June 20, 2024.
