= Franco-Ontarians =

Francophones of Ontario, Canada

Franco-Ontariens
- Flag (1975–present)

Total population
- Francophones: 652,540 (2021) (Note: The following figure is taken from the province's "Inclusive Definition of Francophones," (IDF) which includes those whose mother tongue is French, and those whose mother tongue is not French, but have proficiency in the language, and use French as the primary language at home.) (Note: There are over 1.52 million Ontarians with proficiency in the French language. However, this includes second-language speakers.)

Regions with significant populations
- Ontario (Eastern, Northeastern, and Central Ontario including the Greater Toronto Area) (Note: Central Ontario's population data includes the Greater Toronto Area, as tabulated by the Government of Ontario with data from the 2021 Canadian census.)

Languages
- Canadian French · Canadian English · Franglais

Religion
- Latin Catholics

Franco-Ontarians (French: Franco-Ontariens or Franco-Ontariennes if female, sometimes known as Ontarois and Ontaroises) are Francophone Canadians that reside in the province of Ontario. Most are French Canadians from Ontario. In 2021, according to the Government of Ontario, there were 652,540 Francophones in the province. The majority of Franco-Ontarians in the province reside in Eastern Ontario, Northeastern Ontario, and the Golden Horseshoe. There are also more isolated francophone communities scattered across other regions of the province, such as in Essex, Penetanguishene, and Welland, among others.

The first francophones to settle in Ontario did so during the early 17th century, when most of it was part of the Pays d'en Haut region of New France. However, French settlement into the area remained limited until the 19th century. The late 19th century and early 20th century saw attempts by the provincial government to assimilate the Franco-Ontarian population into the anglophone majority with the introduction of regulations that promoted the use of English over French, for example Regulation 17. During the late 1960s and 1970s, because of the Quiet Revolution, Franco-Ontarians established themselves as a distinct cultural identity – having only identified as French Canadians before. Francophone rights were furthered in the 1970s as a result of C'est l'temps, a Franco-Ontarian civil disobedience movement that pressured several provincial departments to adopt bilingual policies.

The provincial government passed the French Language Services Act in 1986 which recognized the French language as a "historic language of Ontario," and as an official language of the province's education system, judiciary, and legislature. However, the Act did not make the French language an official language in its entirety; with other provincial services only made available in French in designated communities and regions with a significant Franco-Ontarian population.

== Definition ==
The term Franco-Ontarian has two related usages, which overlap closely but are not identical: it may refer to francophone residents of Ontario, regardless of their ethnicity or place of birth, or to people of French Canadian ancestry born in Ontario, regardless of their primary language or current place of residence. In June 2009, the provincial government expanded the definition of a francophone as a person whose mother tongue is French, or a person that has a different mother tongue but still uses French as the primary language at home. The term Ontarois is used sometimes to distinguish French-speaking Ontarians, while the general term for Ontarian in French is Ontarien. The use of the term Ontarois follows the convention that a francophone minority is referred to with endings of -ois.

In popular usage,the first meaning predominates and the second is poorly understood. Although most Franco-Ontarians meet both definitions, there are notable exceptions. For example, although Louise Charron was the first native-born Franco-Ontarian appointed to the bench of the Supreme Court of Canada, she was preceded as a francophone judge from Ontario by Louise Arbour, a Quebecer who worked in Ontario for much of her professional career as a lawyer and judge. As a result, both women have been referred to as "the first Franco-Ontarian Supreme Court justice", although the technically correct practice is to credit Charron, Franco-Ontarian in both senses, with that distinction.

Conversely, two of the most famous rock musicians from Ontario, Avril Lavigne and Alanis Morissette, are Franco-Ontarian by the second definition but not by the first, since they were born to Franco-Ontarian parents but currently live outside Ontario and work primarily in English. Former Prime Minister Paul Martin was born in Windsor to a Franco-Ontarian father from Pembroke and an anglophone mother, although many Canadians consider him a Quebecer as he represented a Montreal riding in Parliament.

Both meanings can be politically charged. Using the second to the exclusion of the first may be considered offensive to some in that it excludes francophones born in or with ethnic origins from other francophone countries from the Franco-Ontarian community. Using the first to the exclusion of the second obscures the very real ethno-cultural distinctions that exist between Franco-Ontarians, Québécois, Acadians, Métis and other Canadian francophone communities, and the pressures toward assimilation into the English Canadian majority that the community faces. As a result, the complex political and sociological context of Franco-Ontarian can only be fully understood by recognizing both meanings and understanding the distinctions between the two.

== Demographics ==
Franco-Ontarians constitute the largest French-speaking community in Canada outside Quebec. According to the province of Ontario, there are 650,000 Francophones in Ontario, making up 4.6 per cent of the province's population. However, the figure is derived from the province's "Inclusive Definition of Francophones" (IDF), which includes respondents from the 2021 Canadian Census who reported French as their mother tongue and respondents whose mother tongue was not French but have proficiency in the language and use it as their primary language at home. Before the introduction of IDF in 2009, a respondent's mother tongue was the main measure used by the government to determined the number of francophones in the province. There were 590,000 Ontarians, or 4.2 per cent of the population, that reported having French as a mother tongue in the 2021 census, making it the most common mother tongue in the province after English.

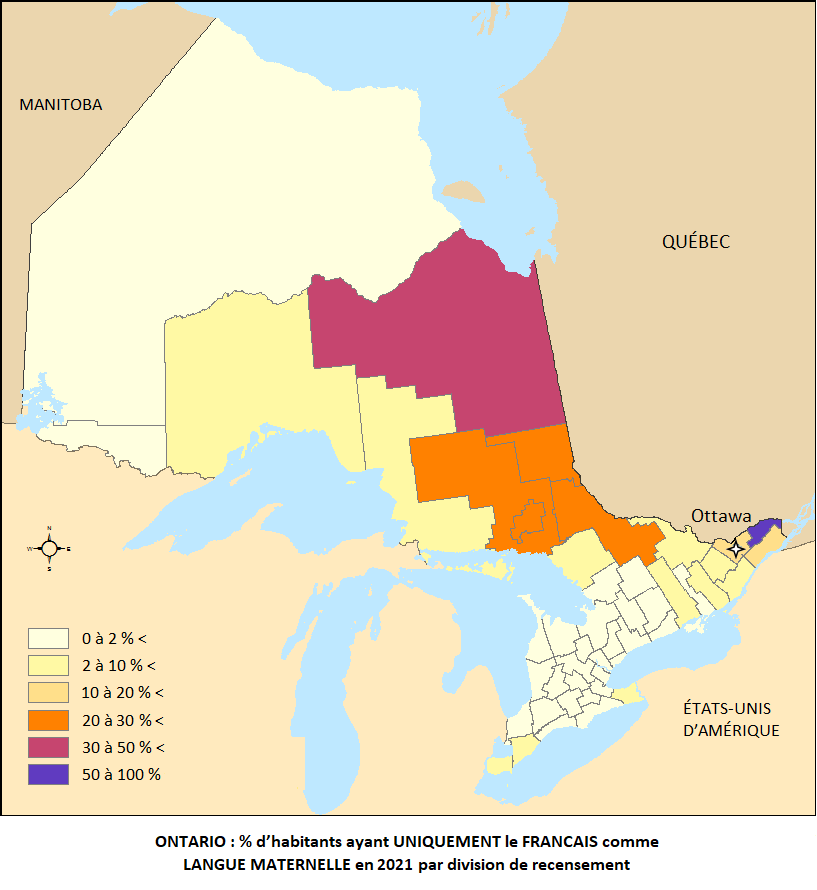
Proportion of Ontarians who declared French as their only mother tongue in the 2021 Canadian census, by census division.

The majority of Franco-Ontarians are bilingual in both French and English; a minority (40,045 respondents in 2016) reported having proficiency in only the French language and limited or no knowledge of English. In the same census, more than 1.52 million Ontarians, or 11.5 per cent of the province's population, reported having proficiency in the French language; while 11.2 per cent of the population reported to be bilingual in French and English. However, that figure includes both Franco-Ontarians and Ontarians who speak French as a second language.

In 2016, approximately 16.1 per cent of francophone Ontarians identified as a visible minority. More than half of Ontario's francophone visible minority population reside within Central Ontario (including the Greater Toronto Area), with 37.8 per cent residing in Eastern Ontario, and the remaining 5.7 per cent in other areas of the province.

In 2016, 59.5 per cent of francophones in Ontario were born in the province, while 19.6 per cent originated from Quebec, and 16.4 per cent came from all other provinces or territories in Canada. However, the percentage of those born in the province varies between region, with 85.3 per cent of francophones in Northeastern Ontario being born in Ontario; whereas only 39.6 per cent of francophones in Central Ontario were born in the province. 4.5 per cent of francophones in Ontario were born outside Canada. 35 per cent of francophones born outside Canada were born in Africa, while 28 per cent were from Europe, 20 per cent from Asia, and 17 per cent from other countries in the Americas. Francophone immigrants account for 15 per cent of all immigrants into Ontario, and nearly a third of all immigrants into Central Ontario. 17.4 per cent of immigrants to the province between 2011 and 2016 were francophone.

=== Communities ===
Franco-Ontarians may be found in all areas of Ontario. Approximately 43.1 per cent of francophones in province reside in Eastern Ontario, with 268,070 francophones living in that region. Francophones comprise approximately 15.4 per cent of Eastern Ontario's total population. More than 68 per cent of francophones that live in Eastern Ontario reside in its Champlain region, an area that encompasses Cornwall, Hawkesbury, Ottawa and Pembroke (all of which are adjacent to or near the Ontario-Quebec border).

However, Northeastern Ontario is the region that has the highest proportion of francophones, with the 122,360 francophone residents of the region making up 22.6 per cent of the region's population. Central Ontario also has a large population of Franco-Ontarians, with 191,375 francophones residing in that region, which includes 63,055 Franco-Ontarians living in the Greater Toronto Area. Other areas include 33,555 Franco-Ontarians in Southwestern Ontario and 7,055 Franco-Ontarians in Northwestern Ontario.

== History ==
=== Early history ===
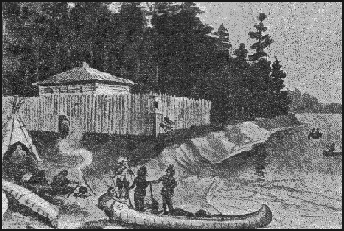
Depiction of Fort Rouillé (in present-day Toronto), c. 1750s. The fort was one of several French fortification in the Pays d'en Haut region of New France.

Étienne Brûlé is often considered the first francophone and European to have arrived in the region in 1610. During this time, most of Ontario formed a part of New France's Pays d'en Haut region; with most of the European inhabitants in the region at the time being coureurs de bois and voyageurs, or Jesuit missionaries in Huronia; most notably the settlements of Sainte-Marie among the Hurons (in present-day Midland) in 1649, and another settlement in Sault Sainte Marie in 1668. During the late 17th and early 18th centuries, the military of New France established a number of fortifications and garrisons in the region, including Fort Frontenac (in present-day Kingston) in 1673, and Fort Rouillé (in present-day Toronto) in 1750. The development of Fort Pontchartrain in Detroit, led to the development of Petite Côte, a permanent settlement south of the Detroit River. The settlement was the first permanent settlement in Ontario, and eventually became Windsor. However, European settlement into the region remained largely limited during this period.

After the Treaty of Paris was negotiated in 1763, New France was ceded to the British. Present day Ontario was governed as a part of the Province of Quebec until 1791, when Ontario was severed from the colony, forming Upper Canada. In 1797, the Legislative Assembly of Upper Canada passed the Upper Canada School Act, which provided for schools that used English and French and instructional languages. In 1798, during the final years of the French Revolution, French nobleman Joseph-Geneviève de Puisaye led a small group of royalists from France to settle lands north of York (present day Toronto).

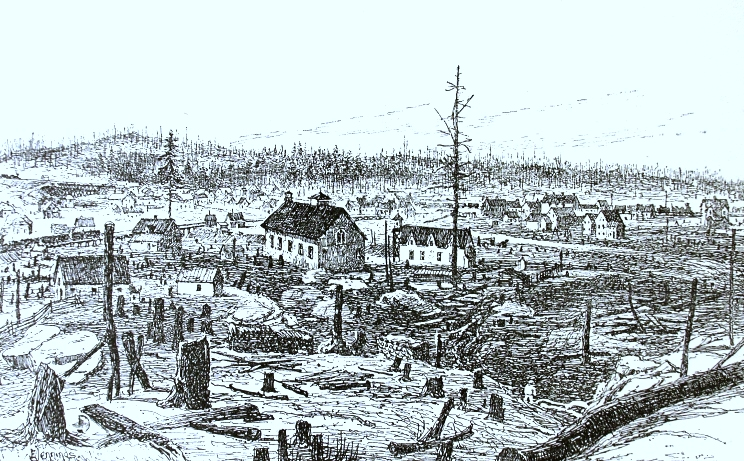
Sudbury in 1888. The community saw an influx of francophone migrants with the discovery of nickel in the area.

French migration into Canada West/Ontario did not accelerate until the second half of the 19th century, farmers from Canada East/Quebec began to migrate in search of fertile land in Eastern Ontario, and along the Canadian Pacific Railway north of Lake Nipissing and Lake Huron. A large number of French Canadians were also drawn to Northern Ontario during this period, with the discovery of nickel in Sudbury, and gold in Timmins.

In an attempt to alleviate anti-French sentiments, in 1885 George William Ross, the provincial Minister of Education, mandated the requirement of English to be taught in francophone schools for two hours in the first four years of elementary school, and for four hours in its final four years.

=== 20th century ===
==== 1901–1950 ====
The late 19th century, and early 20th century saw the Ontario government much less supportive of, and often openly hostile toward the Franco-Ontarian community. In an attempt to protect Franco-Ontarian language rights, the Association canadienne-française d'Éducation de l'Ontario (ACFÉO) was formed in 1910, who typically opposed the English-only initiatives launched by the Orange Order of Canada, and Irish Catholics led by Michael Fallon, the Bishop of London, Ontario. However, French Canadian migration throughout Ontario continued, with sawmills and papermills in Kapuskasing, and Hearst; and automotive plants in Oshawa and Windsor attracting French Canadian laborers during the 1920s.

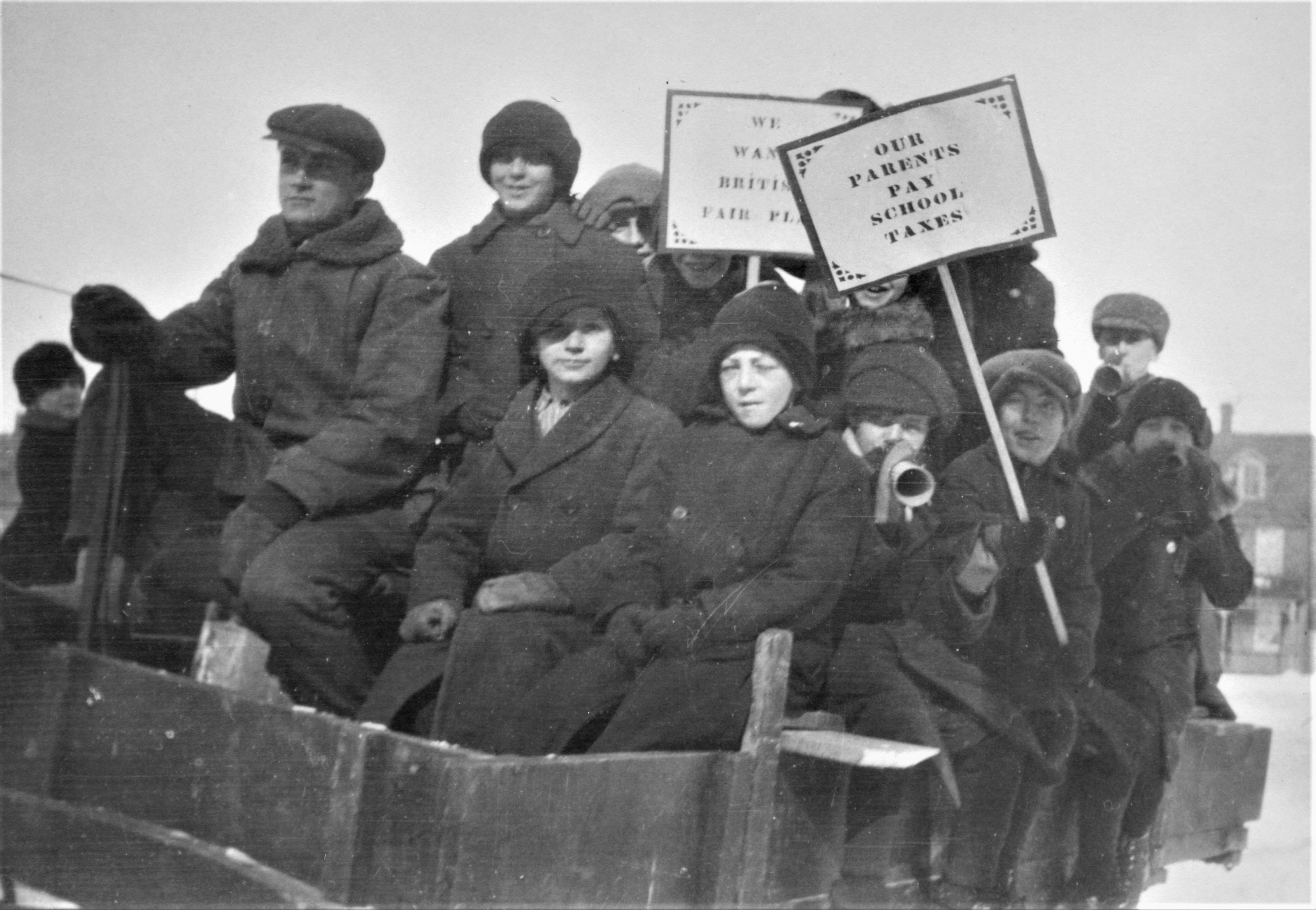
Children in Ottawa protesting against Regulation 17, 1916. The regulation was in place from 1912 to 1927, prohibiting French-language instruction in Ontario schools.

In 1912, the provincial government passed Regulation 17, which limited the use of the French as the primary language of instruction to the first two years of elementary school. However, enforcement of the regulation was abandoned in 1927, when it became apparent to the provincial government that the regulation perpetuated inferior schooling of pupils in the province. Instead, a new policy permitting French-language schools instruction was introduced, with French given legal status in Ontario's education system, and the bilingual University of Ottawa Normal School was officially recognized. The regulation formally remained in the statutes of Ontario until 1944, when the regulations were revised.

Although the regulation itself was rescinded in 1927, the government did not fund French language high schools. As a result, francophones had to pursue high school education in English, pay tuition to private high schools (which few Franco-Ontarian families could afford), or simply stop attending school after Grade 9. Due to the lack of funding, several generations of Franco-Ontarians grew up without formal education, with the dropout rate for francophones high during this period. Franco-Ontarians thus opted for jobs which did not require reading and mathematical skills, such as mining and forestry, and were virtually absent from white collar jobs. Sociologically, it meant that education was not a value transmitted to younger Franco-Ontarians. Further, those that did have higher levels of education often pursue job opportunities in larger cities, particularly Ottawa or even Montreal, which can create a barrier to economic development in their home communities. As well, even today many students of Franco-Ontarian background are still educated in anglophone schools. This has the effect of reducing the use of French as a first language in the province, and thereby limiting the growth of the Franco-Ontarian community.

Quebec writer Yves Beauchemin once controversially referred to the Franco-Ontarian community as "warm corpses" (« cadavres encore chauds ») who had no chance of surviving as a community. In a similar vein, former Quebec Premier René Lévesque referred to them as "dead ducks".

==== 1951–2000 ====
The late 1960s saw a schism form between the francophones in Quebec, and the other francophone communities of Canada, notably the francophones in Ontario. The emergence of a separate québécois identity during the Quiet Revolution; this resulted in the development of a unique Franco-Ontarian identity, with francophones in Ontario forced to re-conceptualize their identities without relying on francophones in Quebec.

Recommendations from the Provincial Committee on Aims and Objectives of Education in the Schools of Ontario, and the Bériault Report led to the provincial government passing the Schools Administration Act, and the Secondary Schools and Boards Act in 1968. The following acts introduced public funding for French-language secondary schools, and laid the foundation for the province's present elementary and secondary francophone school system. In 1969, the provincial government established its French-language public educational broadcaster, TFO.

Following the advice of the Royal Commission on Bilingualism and Biculturalism, Ontario's premier John Robarts made French an official language of the provincial legislature in 1970. While the Victoria Charter was being negotiated between the provincial premiers and the federal government, Robarts agreed that the province would recognize Franco-Ontarians rights to access provincial public service in the French language, and for French-speakers to receive the services of an interpreter, if needed, in Ontario's courts. However, plans to adopt these measures were abandoned after negotiations for the Victoria Charter collapsed. His successor, Bill Davis instead opted to simply provide legal services in French, with the issuance of bilingual drivers licenses and government documents.

A civil disobedience movement made up of Franco-Ontarian wanting to further accessibility rights for French-speakers emerged in 1975, known as C'est l'temps. Members of C'est l'temps refused to pay tickets issued in only in English, pressuring the provincial judiciary to act in a bilingual manner. As a result of the protest, the Ontario's Attorney General, Roy McMurtry authorized the first French-language provincial court proceeding in 1976.

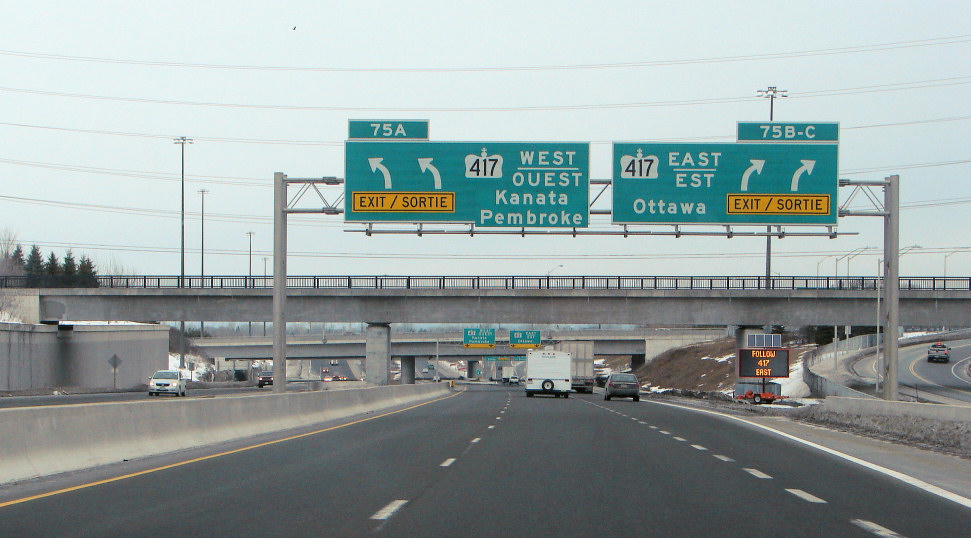
A bilingual gantry sign on a provincially-maintained highway. Access to provincial services in French was mandated for designated areas in 1986.

Other departments in the government of Ontario also began to adopt policies of bilingualism, and policies for French services, such as the Ministry of Health in 1979, and the Ministry of Children, Community and Social Services in 1980. French was formally made an official language of the provincial judiciary in 1984. In 1986, the provincial French Language Services Act was passed by the Legislative Assembly of Ontario, where it recognized French as a "historic language in Ontario," an official language in its courts and in education, as well as the "desirable use" of French in its provincial institutions including the Legislature. However, the Act itself did not make the province bilingual, instead designating a number of communities where French-speakers constitute a majority or significant minority, as an area where provincial services are required to be provided in French and English.

The following legislation saw pushback from several anglophone Ontario towns and cities, most notably Sault Ste. Marie, which was persuaded by the Alliance for the Preservation of English in Canada to declare themselves "English-only" in the wake of the French Language Services Act and the Meech Lake Accord debate. This was considered by many observers to be a direct contributor to the resurgence of the Quebec sovereignty movement in the 1990s, and consequently to the 1995 Quebec referendum.

=== 21st century ===
On October 19, 2004, a Toronto lawyer successfully challenged a "no left turn" traffic ticket on the basis that the sign was not bilingual in accordance with the 1986 French Language Services Act. The judge in R. v. Myers ruled that the traffic sign was not a municipal service, but instead was regulated under the provincial Highway Traffic Act and therefore subject to the bilingual requirements of the French Language Services Act. As this was a lower court ruling, it did not affect any other court. However the implication of the decision was that many traffic signs in bilingually designated areas of Ontario would be invalid. It was feared that the ruling would have a similar effect as the Manitoba Language Rights ruling of the Supreme Court of Canada, in this case forcing municipalities to erect new bilingual road signs at great expense and invalidating millions of dollars in existing tickets before the courts. The City of Toronto appealed the ruling. At the appeal hearing both parties asked the court to enter a plea of guilty. A guilty verdict was entered even though no arguments were made by either side on the merits of the case. The situation created a legal vacuum for several years, during which numerous defendants used the bilingual signage argument to fight traffic tickets. The precedent was overturned by the Ontario Court of Appeal in a 2011 case, R. v. Petruzzo, on the grounds that the French Language Services Act specifically states that municipalities are not required to offer services in French, even in provincially regulated areas such as traffic signage, if the municipality has not specifically passed its own bylaw governing its own provision of bilingual services.

Ontario's Minister of Francophone Affairs, Madeleine Meilleur, became the province's first cabinet minister to attend a Francophonie summit in 2004, travelling to Ouagadougou with counterparts from Quebec, New Brunswick and the federal government. Meilleur also expressed the hope that Ontario would someday become a permanent member of the organization. On November 26, 2016, Ontario was granted observer status by La Francophonie.

On January 10, 2005, Clarence-Rockland became the first Ontario city to pass a bylaw requiring all new businesses to post signs in both official languages. Clarence-Rockland is 60 per cent francophone, and the city council noted that the bylaw was intended to address the existence of both English-only and French-only commercial signage in the municipality.

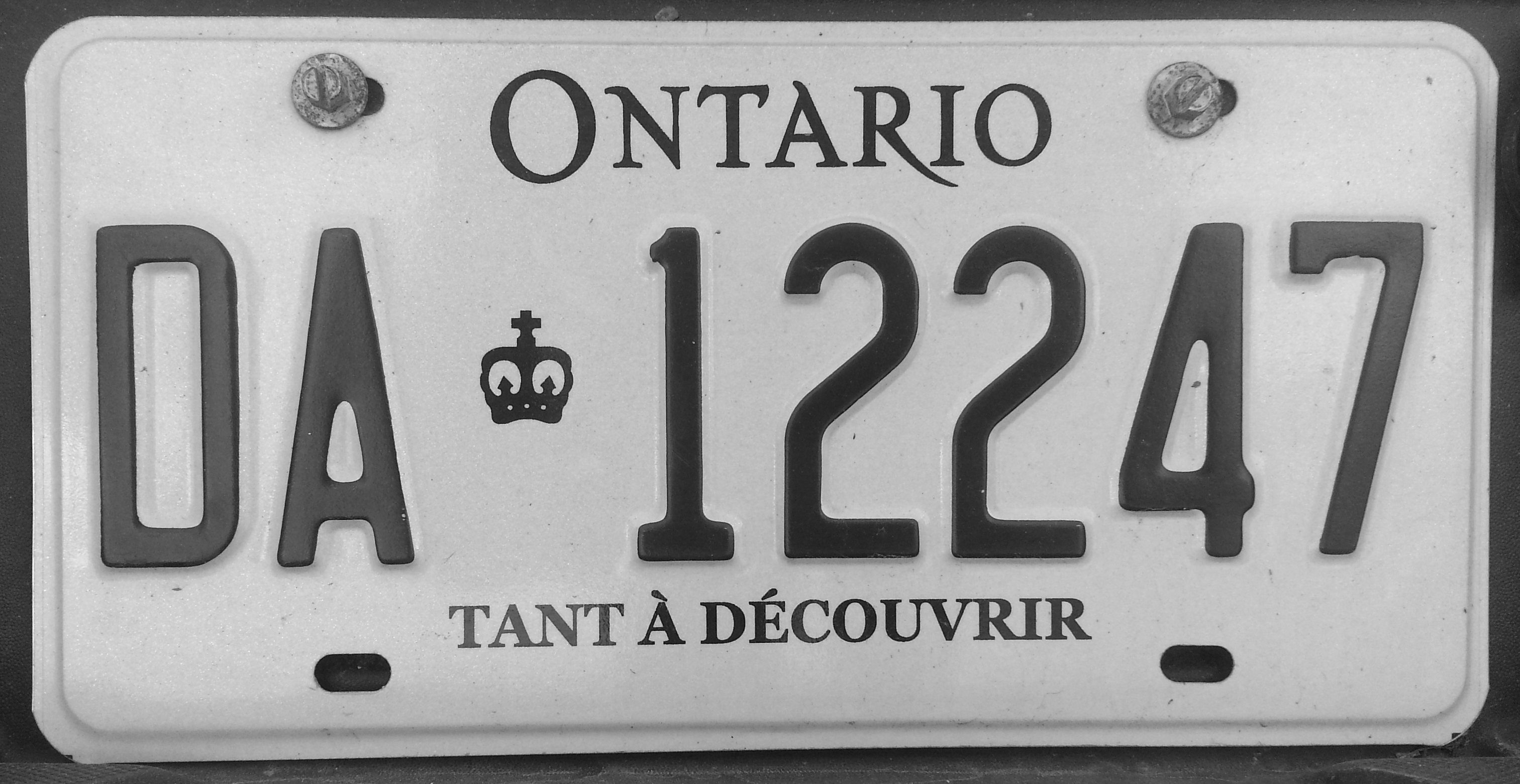
A French-language Ontario license plate. The province introduced French plates in 2008 as an alternate to its English plates.

In 2008, the provincial government officially introduced a French licence plate, with the French slogan "Tant à découvrir" in place of "Yours to Discover", as an optional feature for drivers who wished to use it.

In 2009, the government faced controversy during the H1N1 flu pandemic, when it sent out a health information flyer in English only, with no French version published or distributed for the province's francophone residents. In response, MPP France Gélinas introduced a private member's bill in May 2011 to have the provincial Commissioner of French Language Services report to the full Legislative Assembly of Ontario rather than exclusively to the Minister of Francophone Affairs.

==== 2010s ====
On April 26, 2010, the Ontario government designated September 25 as Franco-Ontarian Day. This date was chosen as it represented the anniversary of the official raising of the Franco-Ontarian flag in 1975. On 22 February 2016, premier of Ontario Kathleen Wynne formally issued an apology on behalf of the government of Ontario to Franco-Ontarians for the passage of Regulation 17, and its harmful impact on its communities. The motion for the government to present an official apology to the Franco-Ontarian community was first presented by Glenn Thibeault.

In 2015, MPP France Gélinas introduced a private member's bill to mandate the creation of a fully independent French-language university. Although her bill did not pass, the government of Kathleen Wynne announced the creation of a French-language university in 2017.

In 2018, the provincial government of Doug Ford announced several government cutbacks that impacted the Franco-Ontarian community, including ending the position of the French Language Services Commissioner and transferring its responsibilities to the office of the Ontario Ombudsman, reducing the status of the Ministry of Francophone Affairs from a full ministry to a government office, and cancelling funding announced by the prior government of Kathleen Wynne for the creation of the French-language university. After extensive backlash to the announcement, Ford reversed course, announcing that the commissioner position would be retained and that the office of francophone affairs would be restored to a full government ministry. The actions led to one Franco-Ontarian MPP, Amanda Simard, leaving her caucus to sit as an independent. During this period, governments in Quebec began to fly the Franco-Ontarian flag as a gesture of solidarity. The flag was hoisted at Montreal City Hall on November 23, and at the National Assembly of Quebec on December 1.

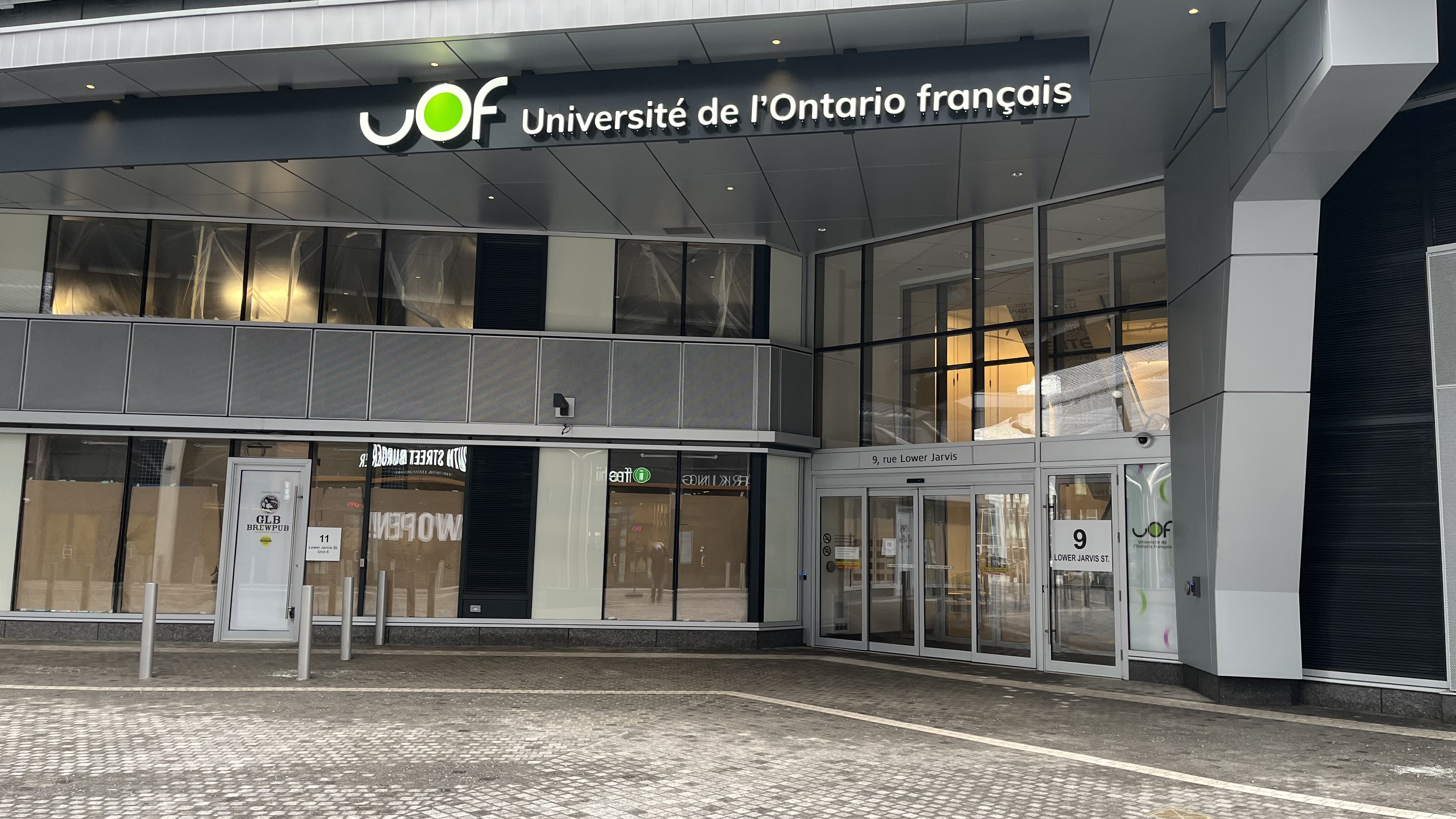
The entrance to the Université de l'Ontario français. Established in 2018, the institution was the first stand-alone francophone university opened in Ontario.

Ford later cancelled funding for the new Francophone university, created by the previous government. However, in September 2019 the provincial and federal governments announced a new funding plan for the creation of the first French language university in the province. The province's first publicly funded university that operates solely as a French-language institution was incorporated in April 2018 as the Université de l'Ontario français, expecting to accept its first cohort of full-time students in 2021.

==== 2020s ====
On September 21, 2020, Legislative Assembly of Ontario passed an amendment to the Franco-Ontarian Emblem Act, 2001, first proposed by Progressive Conservative MPP, Natalia Kusendova, to designate Franco-Ontarian flag as an official emblem of Ontario. It received royal assent and became law on September 24, 2020.

On September 25, 2020, the government under Doug Ford, through Minister of Francophone Affairs, Caroline Mulroney, announced that Franco-Ontarians will be able to request a free replacement driver's licence or Ontario photo card displaying their name using French-language characters.

The Université de Hearst, which teaches entirely in French and for decades operated as a federated college of Laurentian University using Laurentian's degree-granting authority, was chartered as a fully independent university in 2021.

== Politics ==
The Ministry of Francophone Affairs is a department of the government of Ontario responsible for the provision of provincial services to the Franco-Ontarian community. Caroline Mulroney is the provincial cabinet minister responsible for the Francophone Affairs portfolio. The French language has been recognized as an official language of the Legislative Assembly of Ontario since 1970.

In 2016, the government of Ontario was granted observer status to the Organisation internationale de la Francophonie, permitting the provincial government to submit requests to the organization's ministerial conferences, and participate in certain meetings held by the organization. Ontario is one of four governments in Canada that participates in the Francophonie, with the federal government of Canada and the provincial governments of New Brunswick and Quebec being full-fledged members of the organization.

=== Access to services ===
Although French is an official language in Ontario's education system, legislature, and judiciary, the province as a whole is not officially bilingual and its other provincial services do not provide English/French bilingual service throughout the entirety of the province. However, the Ontario French Language Services Act requires all provincial ministries and agencies to provide French-language services within 26 designated municipalities and regions.

An area is designated as a French service area if the francophone population is greater than 5,000 people or 10 per cent of the community's total population. Due to the 5,000 population threshold, large cities that are actually overwhelmingly anglophone with only very small francophone populations proportional to the size of the city, such as Toronto and Mississauga, are nevertheless still subject to the Act. Francophones who live in non-designated areas can also receive French language services by directly contacting the Office of Francophone Affairs in Toronto, or in the nearest designated community. The most recent addition to the list of designated areas is the city of Markham. It was named in June 2015, and after the three-year implementation period provided for by the French Language Services Act, officially became a bilingual service centre in 2018. Enforcement of the French Language Services Act is conducted through the office of the provincial French Language Services Commissioner.

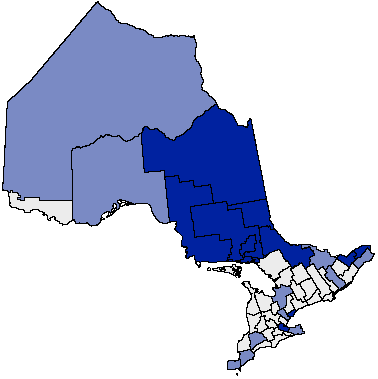
Map of French service areas in Ontario. (Note: The map was last updated in 2010, before Markham was designated under the Act in 2015. As a result, York Region is not coloured light blue.) Dark blue indicates areas designated in their entirety; light blue indicates areas that include designated communities.

The following census divisions (denoted in dark blue on the map) are designated areas in their entirety:

- Algoma District
- Cochrane District
- Greater Sudbury
- City of Hamilton
- Nipissing District
- City of Ottawa
- Prescott and Russell United Counties
- Sudbury District
- Timiskaming District
- City of Toronto

The following census divisions (denoted in light blue on the map) are not fully designated areas, but have communities within their borders which are designated for bilingual services:

- Municipality of Chatham-Kent: Tilbury, Dover Township, Tilbury East Township
- Essex County: Lakeshore, Tecumseh, Windsor
- Frontenac County: Kingston
- Kenora District: Ignace
- Middlesex County: London
- Niagara Region: Port Colborne, Welland
- Peel Region: Mississauga, Brampton
- Renfrew County: Laurentian Valley, Pembroke, Whitewater Region
- Thunder Bay District: Greenstone, Manitouwadge, Marathon, Terrace Bay
- Simcoe County: Essa, Penetanguishene, Tiny
- United Counties of Stormont, Dundas and Glengarry: Cornwall, North Glengarry, North Stormont, South Glengarry, South Stormont, Winchester
- York Region: Markham

The French Language Services Act only applies to provincial government services, and does not require services operated by the municipal government to provide bilingual services, although several municipalities have done so at their own discretion. There are presently 44 communities in Ontario whose municipal government and services are bilingual in English and French. Most of these are communities are members of the Francophone Association of Municipalities of Ontario, or AFMO.

==== Judicial access ====
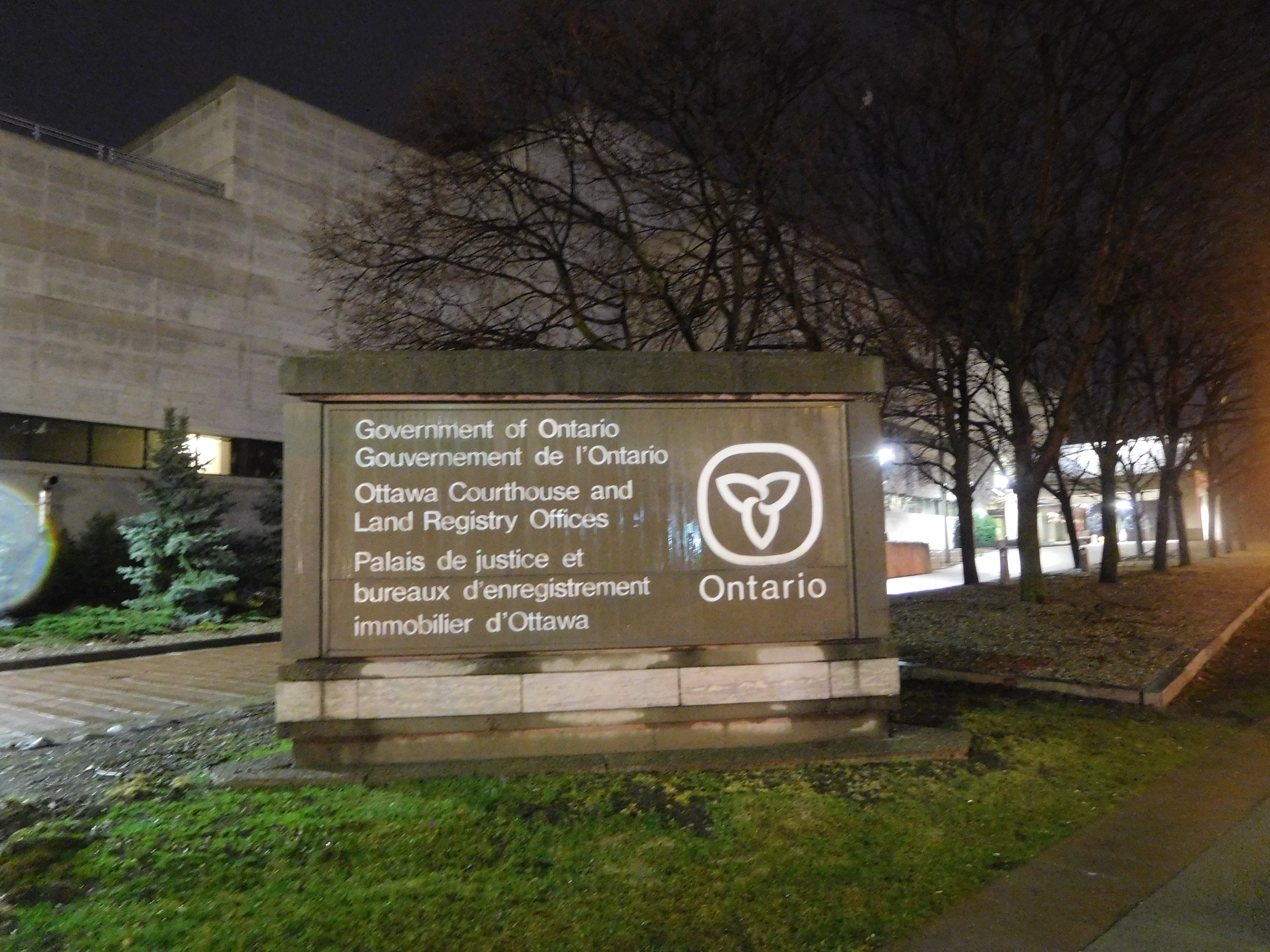
Signage for the Ottawa Courthouse in both English and French

The provincial judicial system is officially bilingual in English and French, with access to a French-speaking justice viewed as a quasi-constitutional right in Ontario. The official languages of the provincial courts was set in s. 125 of the Courts of Justice Act, with s. 126 of the same act outlining the specific rights afforded to a French-speaking party. French-language access within Ontario's judicial administrative offices is also required in designated communities under the French Language Services Act. Francophone linguistic rights are further reinforced for criminal cases as those tried under the Criminal Code, a federal statute, have the right to be tried in either English or French as specified in section 530 of the Code.

However, in practice the courts function primarily in English. Francophones in some parts of the province have noted some difficulty in actually accessing French language services, especially in civil litigation matters; for example, francophones in the justice system have sometimes faced unnecessary and expensive delays in their judicial proceedings, or been forced to proceed in English even if they were merely functional but not fluent in the language, due to gaps in the system's ability to actually provide full French services. Acting upon a number of complaints received from the French Language Service Commissioner, the Attorney General of Ontario launched a committee in 2009 to address French language rights in the judicial system.

On November 14, 2023, Edith Dumont was sworn in as the 30th Lieutenant Governor of Ontario, becoming the first Franco-Ontarian to hold the viceregal office in the province's history. Prior to her appointment, Dumont had a distinguished 30-year career in French-language education, including serving as the first female director of the Conseil des écoles publiques de l'Est de l'Ontario.

== Education ==
=== Elementary and secondary ===
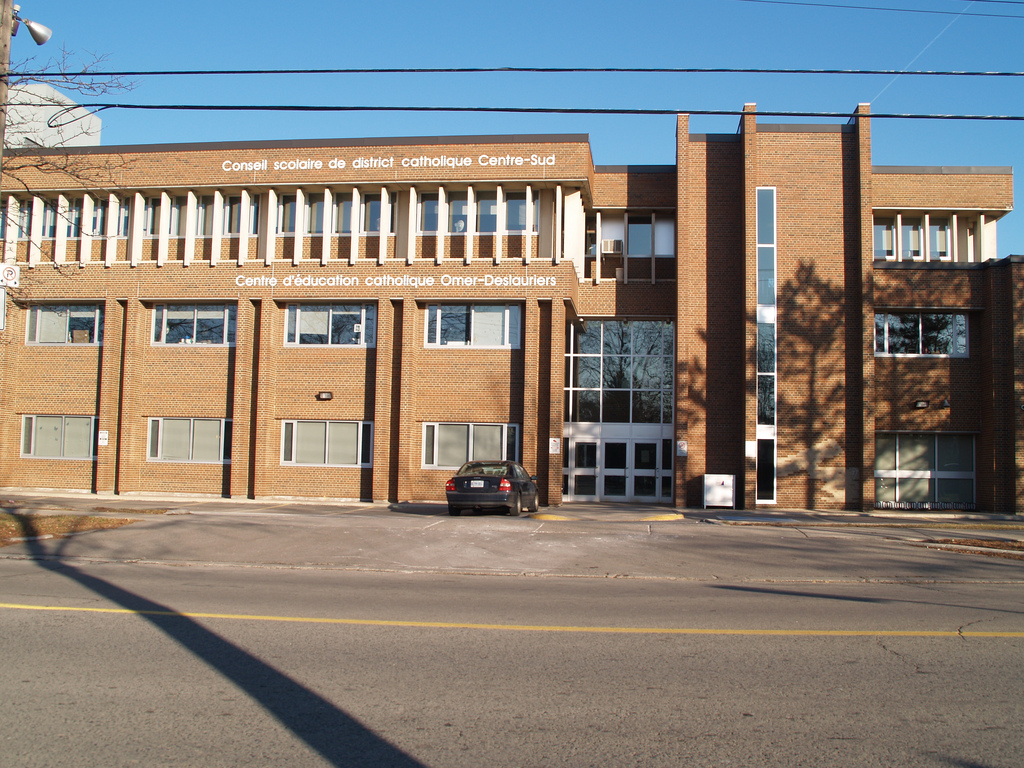
Head office for Conseil scolaire catholique MonAvenir, the French public-separate school board for the Golden Horseshoe.

Legislation on educational instruction in the French language was first passed in Upper Canada under the Upper Canada School Act, 1797, which provided for schools that used English or French as an instructional languages. The use of French as the primary language of instruction was later limited to the first two years of elementary education in Ontario, from 1912 to 1927. In 1927, its enforcement was dropped with the province again permitting French-language instruction past Grade 2. The present public French-language elementary and secondary school system originates from education reforms implemented by the province in 1968. French-language rights for resident elementary and secondary school students in Ontario are afforded through the provincial Education Act and Section 23 of the Canadian Charter of Rights and Freedoms.

Public education in Ontario is managed by the provincial Ministry of Education, which sets the guidelines and curriculum for both its English and French language public school systems. There were 103,490 students enrolled in Ontario's public francophone elementary and secondary schools during the 2015–16 academic year.

In addition to language, public education in Ontario is also split between a secularized, and separate school school systems. As a result, twelve public francophone school boards operate within the province; with four secularized public school boards forming a part of the Association des conseils scolaires des écoles publiques de l'Ontario, and eight separate school boards forming a part of Association franco-ontarienne des conseils scolaires catholiques. In 2016, Ontario's public francophone school boards operated 351 elementary schools, and 104 secondary schools.

These school boards were formed after the passage of the Fewer School Boards Act in 1997, with a number of secularized and separate school boards being split and re-consolidated into larger school districts based on language. The re-consolidated French school boards often serve a significantly larger catchment area than an English-language school board in the province, due to the smaller francophone population.

In addition to public elementary and secondary school, a number of private schools also operate with French as the primary instructional language.

=== Post-secondary ===
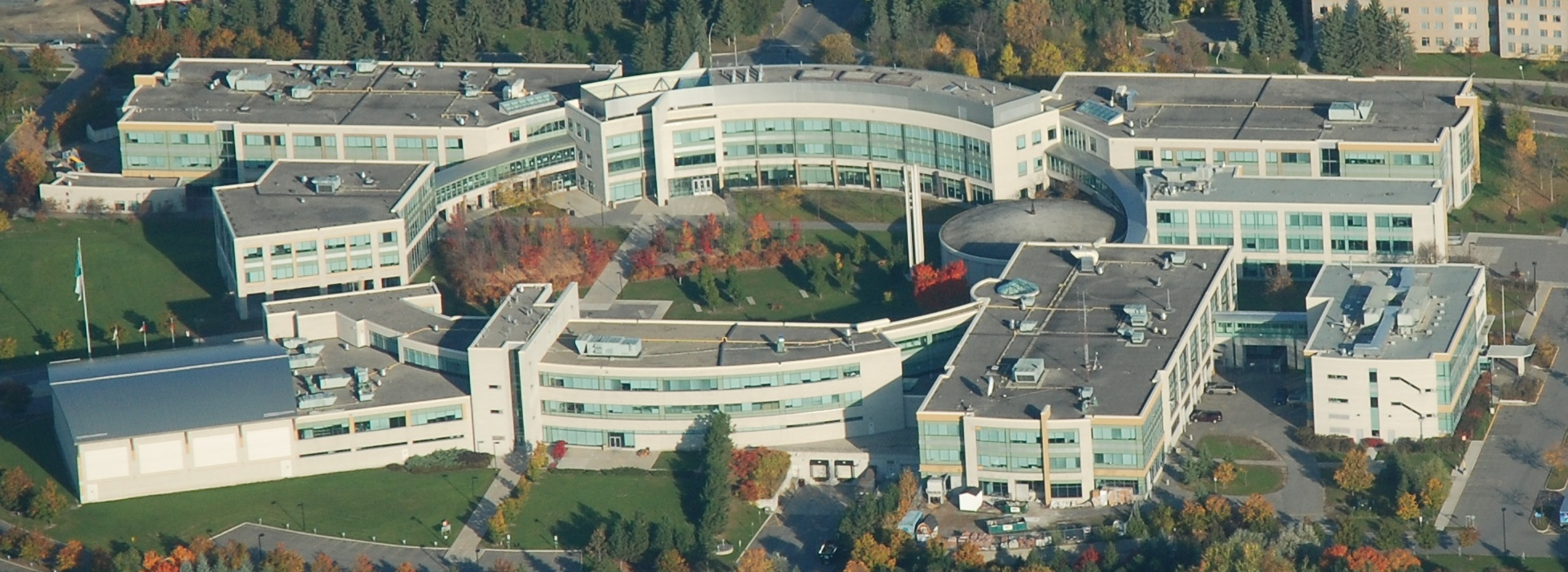
Aerial view of Collège La Cité campus in Ottawa. The institution is one of two public Francophone colleges in Ontario.

Ontario is home to several public post-secondary institutions that operate either as francophone or as bilingual English and French institutions. There were approximately 21,300 students enrolled in a post-secondary francophone program/institution in Ontario during the 2015–16 academic year.

Ontario has two francophone post-secondary colleges, Collège Boréal, and Collège La Cité. The former is based in Sudbury, and operates satellite campuses throughout Ontario; while the latter is based in Ottawa, with a satellite campus in Hawkesbury. A third French-language college, Collège des Grands-Lacs, formerly operated in Toronto from 1995 to 2002. After the college ceased operations, its programs were taken over by Collège Boréal.

There are several publicly funded universities in Ontario where French is the official instructional language. Universities that operate as francophone institutions includes the Université de Hearst and the Université de l'Ontario français. Five other Ontario-based universities are officially bilingual institutions, offering instruction in both English and French, Laurentian University, the Royal Military College of Canada, the University of Ottawa, the University of Sudbury, and the Northern Ontario School of Medicine University.

Three universities in Ontario also maintain federated or affiliated institutions that provide bilingual instruction in either English or French. Although these affiliated institutions and schools are bilingual, their parent universities are otherwise considered anglophone institutions (except for the bilingual University of Ottawa). Affiliated institutions that are bilingual include Dominican University College, an institution affiliated with Carleton University in Ottawa; Glendon College, an institution affiliated with York University in Toronto; and Saint Paul University, an institution federated with the University of Ottawa. Additionally, the University of Toronto also operates the Ontario Institute for Studies in Education, a functionally bilingual graduate school.

== Language ==
The dialect of French spoken in Ontario known as Franco-Ontarian French is similar to, but distinct from, Quebec French; they constitute part of the greater Canadian French dialect. According to Michel Laurier (1989), the semantic and stylistic value of the use of the subjunctive is progressively disappearing. In the article "Le français canadien parlé hors Québec : aperçu sociolinguistique " (1989), Edward Berniak and Raymond Mougeon underline some characteristics:

- the use of the possessive à
- the transfer of rules from English to French, e.g., "J’ai vu un film sur/à la télévision" which comes from "I saw a film on television", or " Je vais à la maison/chez moi " coming from "I'm going home".
- the loaning of English conjunctions, for instance, "so" for ça fait que or alors.

Due to the large English majority in the province, English loanwords are sometimes used in the informal or slang registers of Franco-Ontarian French. While English loanwords occur to a large extent in many varieties of French in Canada and Europe, there has been more of a conscious effort in Quebec to eliminate anglicisms. In addition, the majority of Franco-Ontarians are, out of necessity, functionally or fluently bilingual in English, a fact that encourages borrowing, as does the fact that the English language has a greater prestige in the province from its being a majority language. Franco-Ontarian communities with a small francophone population tend to have more English-influenced French, and some younger speakers there may feel more comfortable using English than French. On the other hand, the French spoken in French-dominant Ontarian communities (such as Hearst and Hawkesbury), or in those communities near the Quebec border (such as Ottawa), is virtually indistinguishable from Quebec French.

Furthermore, improved access to publicly funded French-language schools and the establishment of bilingual universities and French language community colleges has improved French-language proficiency in younger populations.

== Culture ==
The primary cultural organization of the Franco-Ontarian community is the Assemblée de la francophonie de l'Ontario, or AFO, which coordinates many of the community's cultural and political activities.

Franco-Ontarians retain many cultural traditions from their French Canadian ancestry. For example, unmarried elder siblings dansent sur leurs bas (dance on their socks) when their younger siblings get married. Catholic Franco-Ontarians attend messe de minuit (midnight mass) on Christmas Eve. Many Franco-Ontarians also enjoy late night feasts/parties on Christmas Eve, called réveillon, at which tourtière is a common dish. They also celebrate Saint-Jean-Baptiste Day on June 24 as the national holiday for French Canadians.

=== Franco-Ontarian identity ===
The concept of Franco-Ontarians as a distinct cultural identity emerged during the late 1960s and early 1970s. Prior to this time, virtually all French Canadians were understood as a single unified cultural group regardless of which province they lived in, with Quebec serving as the "citadel" of French Canada.

However, the Estates General of French Canada of 1966 to 1969 radically reshaped the landscape of French Canadian identity. During the Estates General of Canada the Quebec delegation, influenced by the Quiet Revolution, had pushed forward a new concept of a uniquely québécois identity, believing that the French Canadian population risked assimilation unless they focused their efforts on saving "the body of the nation," namely Quebec. However, many Franco-Ontarians perceived the refocus in priorities by the Quebec delegation as an abandonment of the other French Canadian communities, and their shared French Canadian identity. This resulted in what is sometimes described as a "rupture" between the francophones of Quebec, and the Franco-Ontarian community, who were then forced to re-conceptualize their own cultural identities while being reliant on the federal government, as opposed to Quebec.

The actual depth of this "rupture" has been questioned by academics, as Quebec continues to exert strong cultural influence on francophone minority communities in the rest of Canada. However, it remains a prominent theme in contemporary cultural analysis of French Canadian identities, It is also evident that by the early 1970s, a uniquely Franco-Ontarian cultural space had emerged with the creation of new institutions and symbols.

=== Symbols ===
==== Franco-Ontarian Flag ====
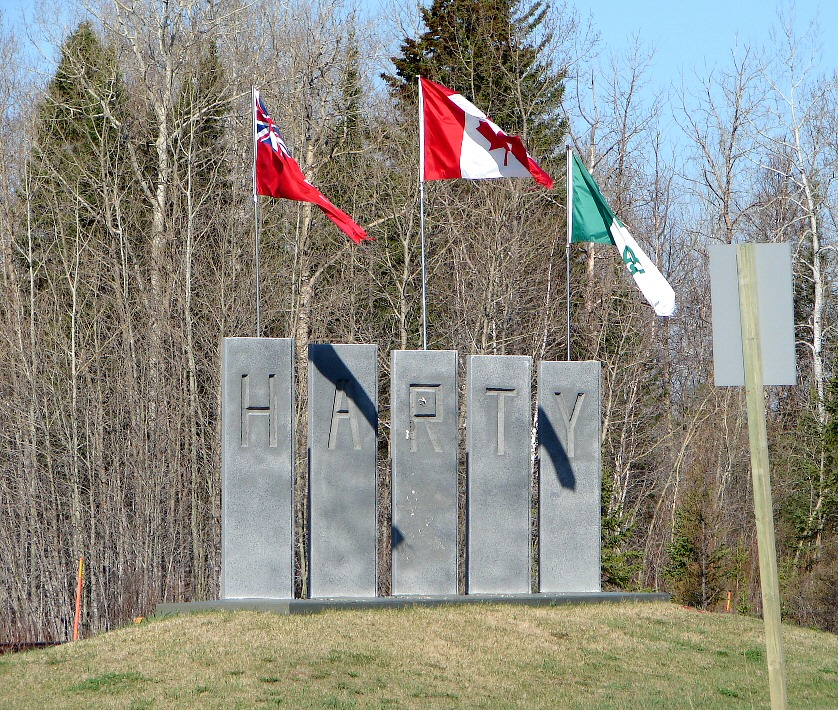
A Franco-Ontarian flag (right-foreground) at a welcome sign for Harty, Ontario.

The Franco-Ontarian flag consists of two bands of green and white. The left portion has a solid light green background with a white fleur-de-lys in the middle, while the right portion has a solid white background with a stylized green trillium in the middle. The green represents the summer months, while the white represents the winter months. The trillium is the floral symbol of Ontario, while the fleur-de-lys represents the French-Canadian heritage of the Franco-Ontarian community. The green color on the flag is Pantone 349.

The flag was created in 1975 by Gaétan Gervais, history professor and Michel Dupuis, first year political science student, both from Laurentian University. It was officially recognized by the Ontario PC government as the emblem of the Franco-Ontarian community in the Franco-Ontarian Emblem Act of 2001. In September 2020, the flag was made an official emblem of the province.

==== Franco-Ontarian Day ====
Franco-Ontarian Day is celebrated on September 25, the anniversary of the first raising of the Franco-Ontarian flag in Sudbury in 1975.

In 2010, the Minister Responsible for Francophone Affairs Madeleine Meilleur introduced Bill 24 to the Legislative Assembly of Ontario to have Franco-Ontarian Day officially recognised by the province. The bill, the Franco-Ontarian Day Act, 2010, passed unanimously and received royal assent in May 2010.

==== Monuments ====
Seven monuments known as Les Monuments de la francophonie d'Ottawa, were erected in Ottawa by the francophone community to commemorate francophone contribution to the development and well-being of the city. The first of the series of monuments, Monuments de la francophonie d'Ottawa was designed by Edward J. Cuhaci, and represents the first homes and the founding of Bytown. The next five monuments, each progressing uphill, highlight business achievements that were crucial to the prosperity of Ottawa economy. The seventh monument, an unfinished granite block, symbolizes future developments.

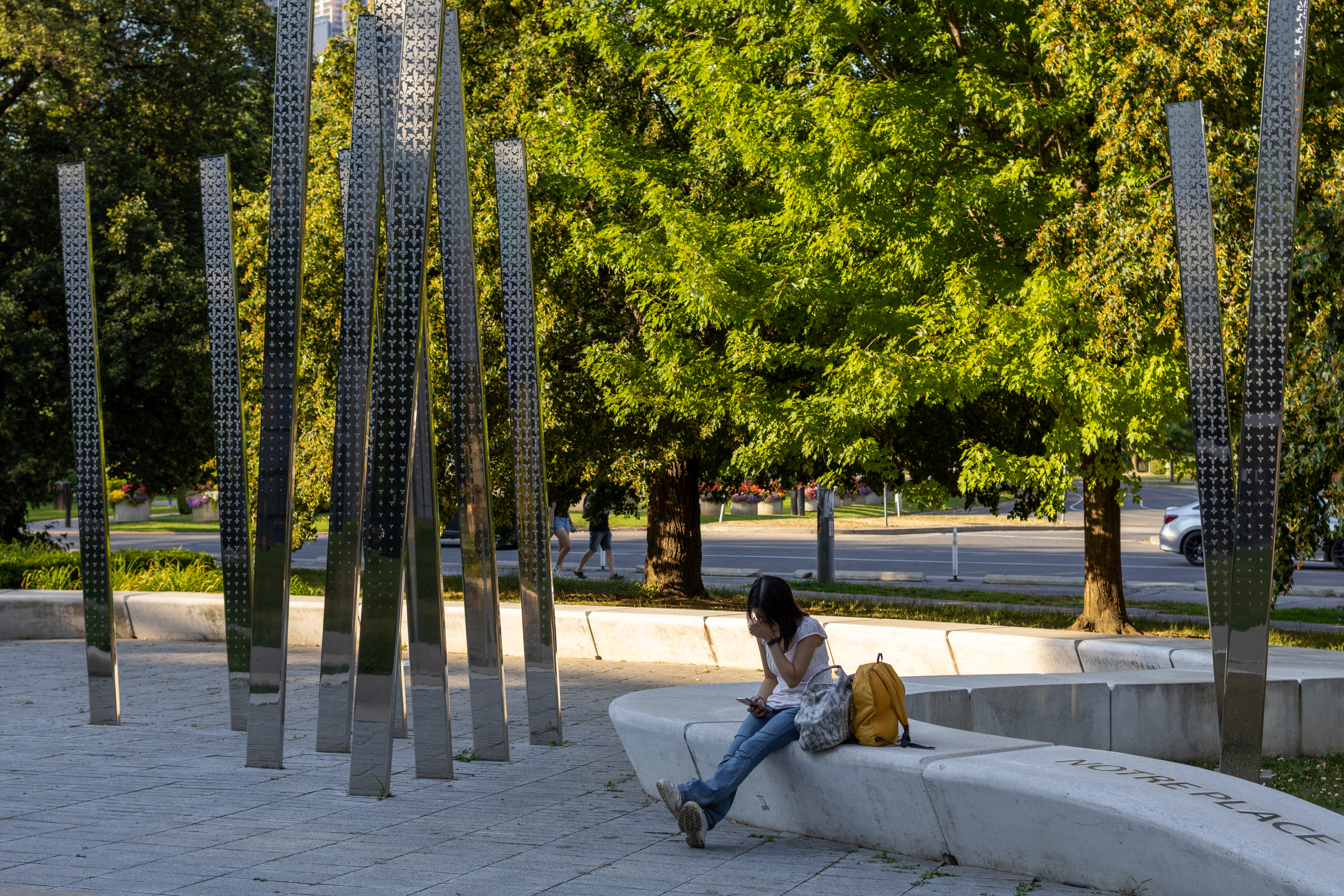
The Notre Place monument in Toronto commemorates the Franco-Ontarian community and their contributions to the province

A monument to Franco-Ontarians also exists at Queen's Park in Toronto. The Notre Place monument commemorates the Franco-Ontarian community as well as the contributions the francophone community made to Ontario. The monument was first proposed in 2015. Work on the monument began on 25 September 2017, on Franco-Ontarian day; it was unveiled on the same day the following year. The stainless steel columns were designed to commemorate Franco-Ontarian contributions in the province's forestry industry, while the surrounding public square was intended to be used as a gathering space. The name of the monument, Notre Place, is a reference to song from Paul Demers and François Dubé. The name of the monument, and the Franco-Ontarian flag is also present on the stoned wall bench that surrounds most of the square. Designed by the architectural firm Brooke McIlroy, the cost to construct the monument was approximate C$900,000.

=== Arts ===
==== Film ====
Through their proximity to Gatineau and Montreal, Ottawa and the communities east of it toward Montreal are the only regions in Ontario which have consistent access throughout the year to French-language theatrical films. However, Cinéfest in Sudbury and the Toronto International Film Festival include francophone films in their annual festival programs, the Toronto-based Cinéfranco festival programs a lineup consisting entirely of francophone films, and community groups in many smaller communities offer French film screenings from time to time, sometimes in conjunction with the Tournée Québec Cinéma touring program of Quebec films. Francophone films also air on TFO, Radio-Canada and cable channels such as Unis and Super Écran.

==== Literature ====
Ontario has seven francophone publishing companies, including Sudbury's Prise de parole, Ottawa's Editions Le Nordir and Les Éditions David.

Notable Franco-Ontarian writers, essayists and poets, include Lola Lemire Tostevin, Daniel Poliquin, Robert Dickson, Jean-Marc Dalpé, François Paré, Gaston Tremblay, Michel Bock, Doric Germain, Fernand Dorais, Hédi Bouraoui, Philippe Bernier Arcand, Andrée Christensen, Patrice Desbiens and Jean Éthier-Blais. The French-language scholar Joseph Médard Carrière was Franco-Ontarian.

==== Music and theatre ====
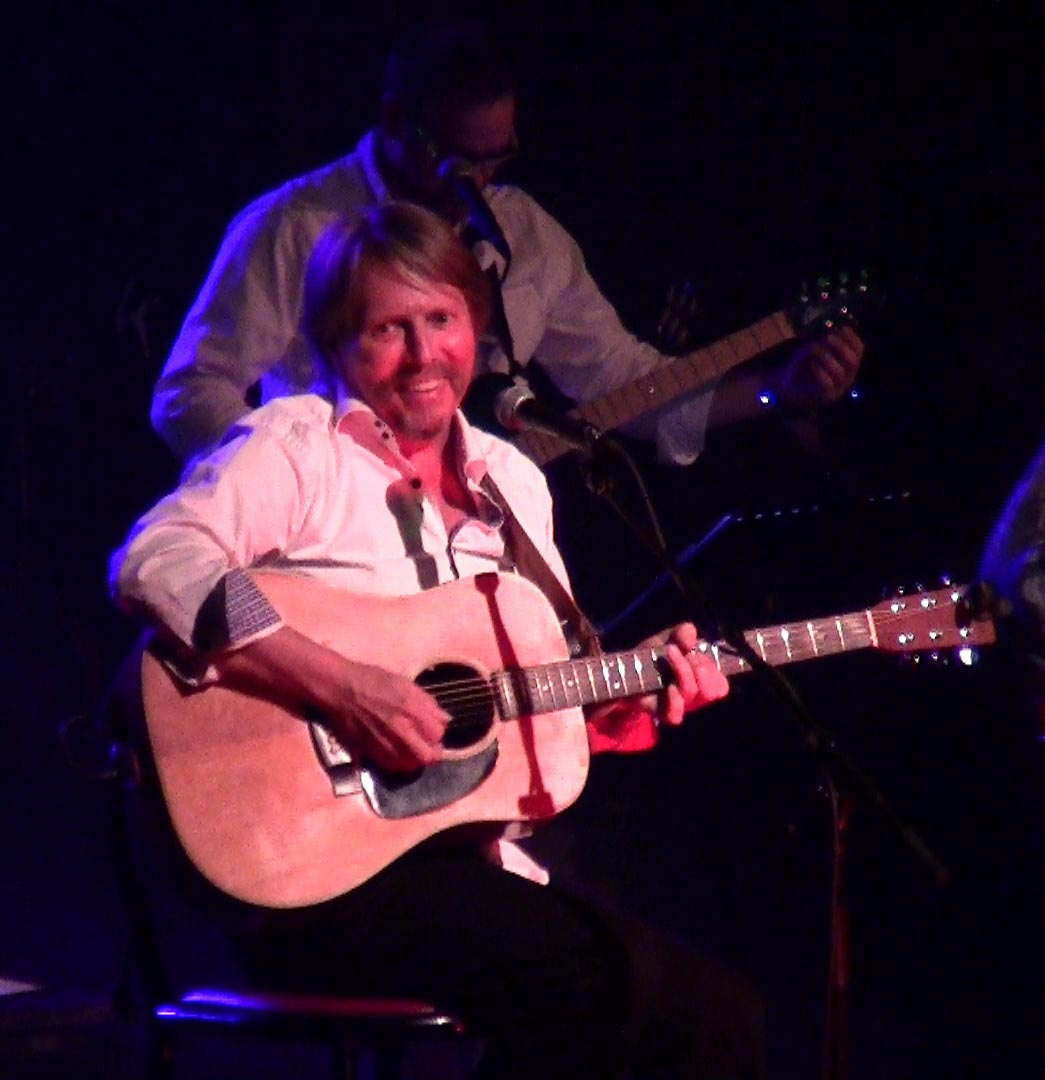
Robert Paquette performs during La Nuit sur l'étang, an annual music festival in Sudbury

Nine professional theatre companies offer French language theatrical productions, including five companies in Ottawa (Théâtre du Trillium, Théâtre de la Vieille 17, Vox Théâtre, Théâtre la Catapulte and Créations In Vivo), one in Sudbury (Théâtre du Nouvel-Ontario) and three in Toronto (Théâtre Corpus, Théâtre La Tangente and Théâtre français de Toronto). There are also numerous community theatre groups and school theatre groups.

Annual music festivals include La Nuit sur l'étang in Sudbury and the Festival Franco-Ontarien in Ottawa. Notable figures in Franco-Ontarian music include Robert Paquette, Marcel Aymar, En Bref, Chuck Labelle, Les Chaizes Muzikales, Brasse-Camarade, Swing, Konflit Dramatik, Stéphane Paquette, Damien Robitaille and CANO.

The song "Notre Place" by Paul Demers and François Dubé, long considered an unofficial anthem of the Franco-Ontarian community after it was written for a gala to celebrate the passage of the French Language Services Act in 1986, was legally designated as the community's official anthem by the Legislative Assembly of Ontario in 2017.

Place des Arts, a multidisciplinary arts centre bringing together many of the francophone arts and culture organizations in Sudbury, opened in 2022.

==== Visual arts ====
La Galerie du Nouvel-Ontario is an art museum whose collections and exhibitions are centred around Franco-Ontarian artists.

=== Media ===
==== Print ====
Ontario had one francophone daily newspaper, Le Droit in Ottawa; due to the increasingly challenging business environment for print newspapers, it moved across the river to Gatineau in 2019 to take advantage of Quebec government funding assistance, but continues to cover Ottawa-related news.

Several other communities in Ontario are served by francophone community weekly papers, including L'Express and Le Métropolitain in Toronto, Le Voyageur in Sudbury, L'Action in London/Sarnia, Le Rempart in Windsor, Le Régional in Hamilton-Niagara and Le Journal de Cornwall in Cornwall.

Important historical publications include Ottawa's Le Progrès, which was launched in 1858 as the province's first francophone newspaper, and Sudbury's L'Ami du peuple, which was published from 1942 to 1968.

==== Radio ====
On radio, the Franco-Ontarian community is served primarily by Radio-Canada's Ici Radio-Canada Première network, which has originating stations in Ottawa (CBOF), Toronto (CJBC), Sudbury (CBON) and Windsor (CBEF), with rebroadcasters throughout Ontario. Ici Musique, Radio-Canada's arts and culture network, currently broadcasts only in Ottawa (CBOX), Toronto (CJBC-FM), Sudbury (CBBX), Kitchener-Waterloo (CJBC-FM-1) and Windsor (CJBC-FM-2), with an additional transmitter licensed but not yet launched in Timmins.

Non-profit francophone community stations exist in several communities, including Penetanguishene (CFRH), Hearst (CINN), Kapuskasing (CKGN), Cornwall (CHOD), Ottawa (CJFO) and Toronto (CHOQ). Many campus radio stations air one or two hours per week of French-language programming as well, although only CHUO at the University of Ottawa and CKLU at Laurentian University are officially bilingual stations.

Francophone commercial radio stations exist in Sudbury (CHYC), Timmins (CHYK) and Sturgeon Falls/North Bay (CHYQ); all three stations are owned and operated by Le5 Communications, and air distinct locally targeted morning shows while operating for the remainder of the day as a shared region-wide simulcast with each station originating some of the common programming. Ottawa francophones are served by the commercial radio stations licensed to Gatineau, and many other Eastern Ontario communities are within the broadcast range of the Gatineau and Montreal media markets. One station in Hawkesbury (CHPR) airs a few hours per week of locally oriented programming, but otherwise simulcasts a commercial station from Montreal.

==== Television ====
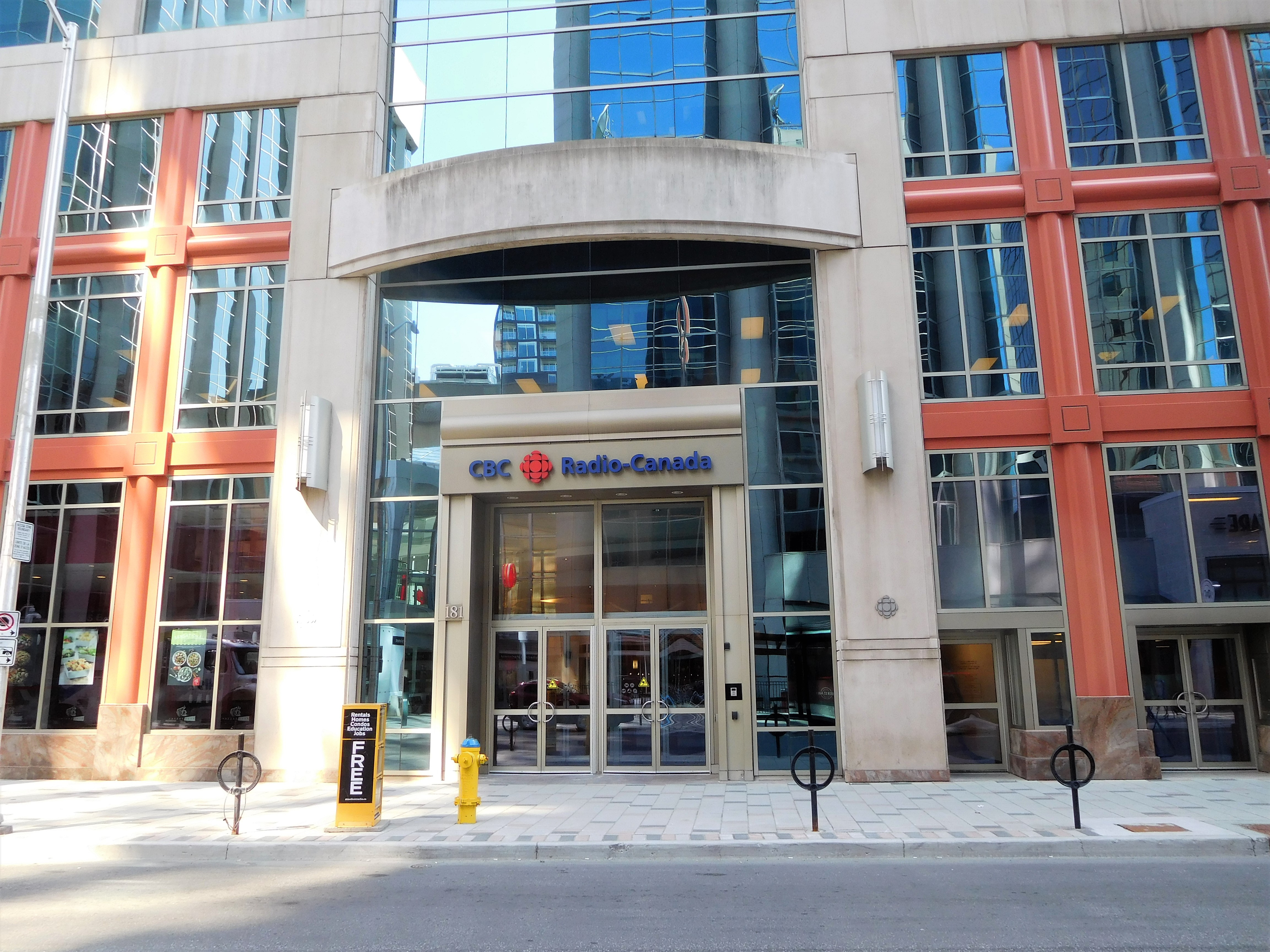
CBC Ottawa Production Centre

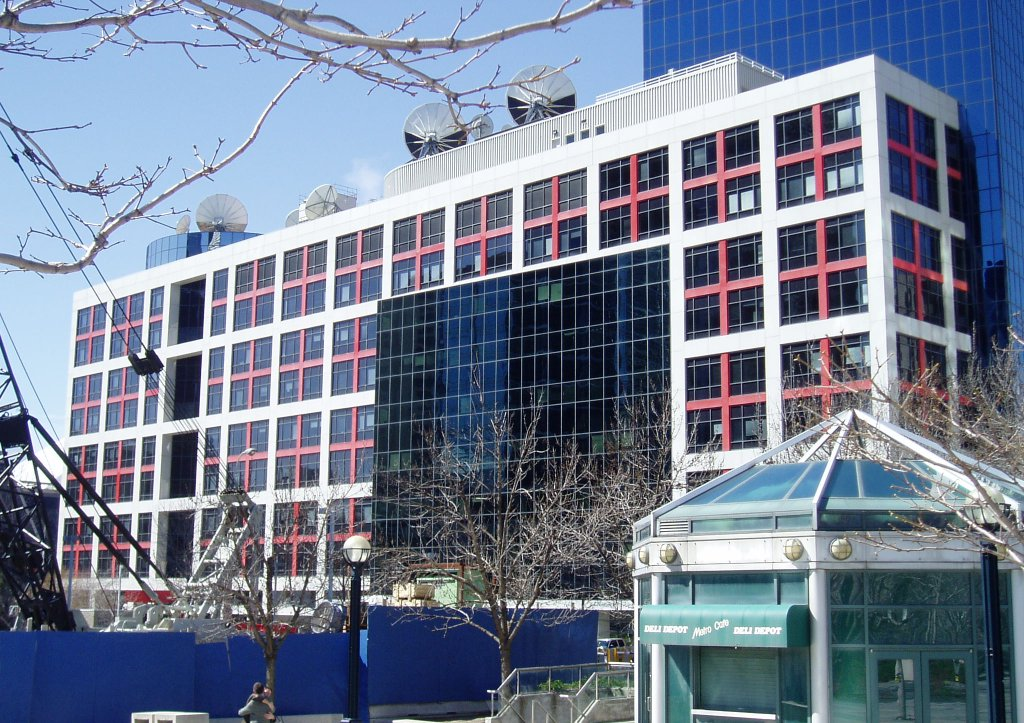
Canadian Broadcasting Centre, Toronto

Radio-Canada, Canada's French language public broadcaster operates two studios in Ontario

The province has two Ici Radio-Canada Télé stations, CBOFT-DT in Ottawa and CBLFT-DT in Toronto, which previously had rebroadcast transmitters throughout the province but remain available provincewide on basic cable. Both stations carry identical programming directed from Radio-Canada's master control in Montreal, except for local news and advertisements. CBOFT produces a newscast for broadcast only in the Ottawa area, while CBLFT produces another serving the rest of the province. The network formerly also operated CBEFT in Windsor, which was shut down in 2012.

The provincial government operates TFO, a sister channel to TVOntario, which is available provincewide via mandatory carriage on basic cable or satellite packages and via online streaming; it formerly also transmitted over the air in selected communities with significant francophone populations, but this was discontinued in 2012. In 2003, TFO produced and aired Francoeur, the first Franco-Ontarian téléroman. In 2008, TFO also began airing the first Franco-Ontarian sitcom, Météo+ — itself, in part, a satire of the Franco-Ontarian community's relative lack of access to local French-language media. In 2012, the production team behind Météo+ launched Les Bleus de Ramville.

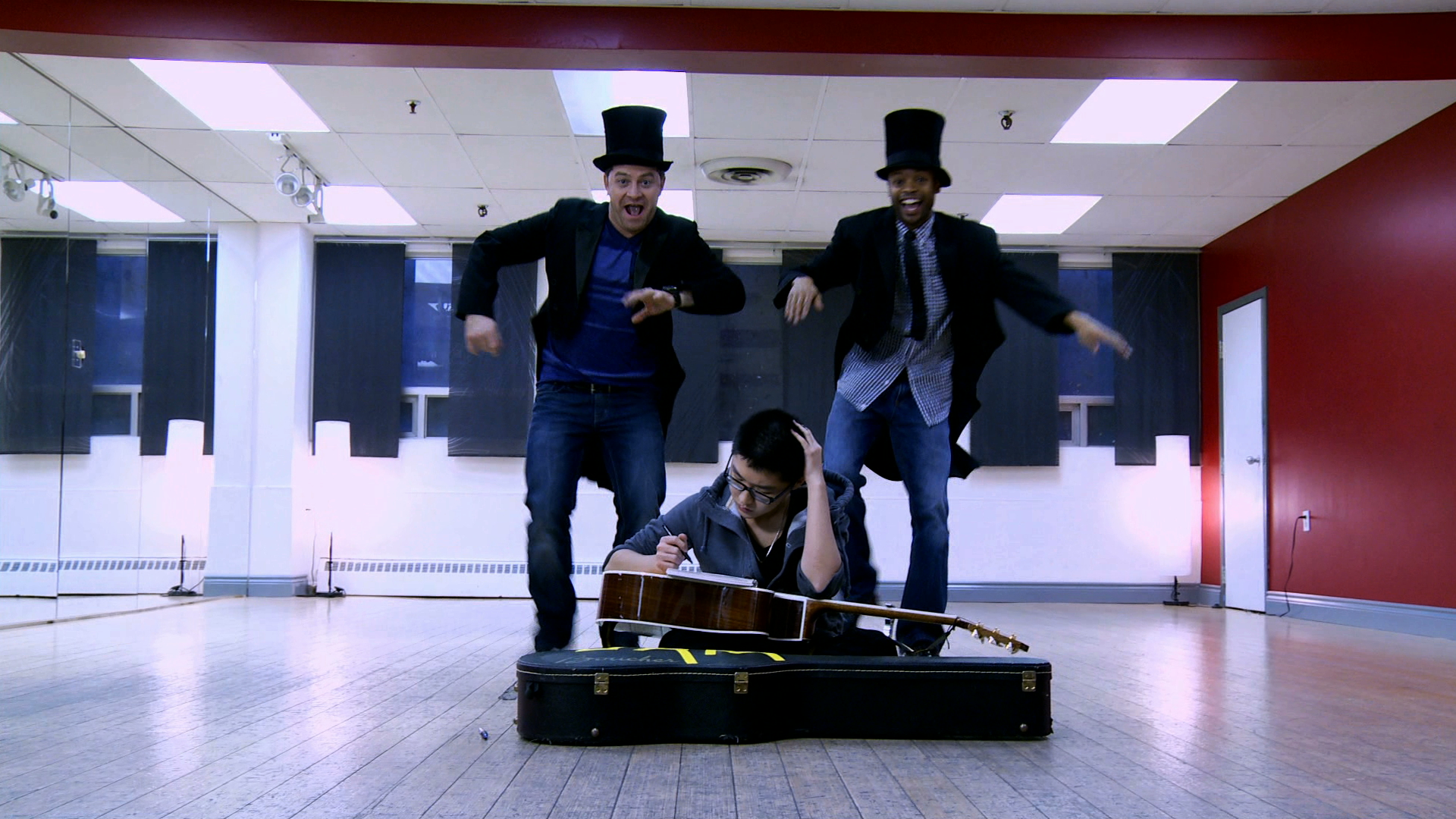
Musicians from JAM TFO, one of several programs of the French language provincial public broadcaster, TFO.

The Quebec-based francophone network TVA as well as specialty channels TV5 Québec Canada and Ici RDI are available on all Ontario cable systems, as these channels are mandated by the CRTC for carriage by all Canadian cable operators. Where there is sufficient local demand for French-language television, Ontario cable systems may also offer French-language channels such as Noovo, Ici ARTV, Elle Fictions and RDS, although these channels only have discretionary status outside Quebec and are typically offered only on a digital cable tier rather than in basic cable packages.

== See also ==
- French Canadians
- Quebecer
- Acadians
- Franco-Albertan, Franco-Columbian, Franco-Manitoban, Franco-Newfoundlander, Franco-Nunavois, Fransaskois, Franco-Ténois, Franco-Yukonnais
