= C'est l'temps =

1970s Franco-Ontarian civil disobedience movement

C'est l'temps (French pronunciation: [sɛltɑ̃], lit. 'This is the time') was a Franco-Ontarian civil disobedience movement in the mid-to-late-1970s protesting the lack of Ontario government services in French. Over two dozen people were arrested, as activists monopolised police time on trivial traffic infractions, refused to pay fines, and sabotaged computer systems.

The movement led to a significant increase in French-language service accessibility and the Ontario justice system becoming officially bilingual in 1984, followed by the French Language Services Act in 1986.

== Background ==
In 1967, Ontario Premier John Robarts pledged to offer services in French following the Royal Commission on Bilingualism and Biculturalism, however, by the early 70s, and despite Robarts' successor Bill Davis, almost no progress had been made on the issue.

At the same time, the separatist movement was gaining momentum in Québec, and regional French-Canadian identities began to assert their individuality.

== Goals ==
The movement made six key demands:

1. An end to unilingual arrests and fines
2. An end to unilingual licence plates
3. Bilingual judicial forms
4. Bilingual driver's licences
5. Bilingual trials
6. Bilingual municipal regulations

== Archives ==
Centre de recherche en civilisation canadienne-française
