= Franco-Ontarian flag =

Flag used to represent Franco-Ontarians

- Use: Civil flag
- Proportion: 1:2
- Adopted: 25 September 1975 (Note: The following date was when the flag was first flown. The flag was later adopted by the Francophone Assembly of Ontario in 1977, and was officially named the flag of the Franco-Ontarian community by provincial legislation in 2001. In 2020, the Legislative Assembly of Ontario amended the Act passed in 2001, making the flag an official emblem of Ontario.)
- Design: A vertical bicolour of green and white; charged with a white fleur-de-lys centred on the green portion and a trillium centred on the white portion
- Designed by: Gaétan Gervais and Michel Dupuis

The Franco-Ontarian flag is a symbol created to represent Franco-Ontarians, reflecting the diverse languages, seasons and people of Ontario. The design consists of two bands of green and white. The left portion has a solid light green background with a white fleur-de-lys in the middle, while the right portion has a solid white background with a stylised green trillium in the middle.

The green represents the summer months, while the white represents the winter months. The trillium is the floral symbol of Ontario, while the fleur-de-lys represents the French Canadian heritage of the Franco-Ontarian community. The green colour on the flag is Pantone 349, in RGB (0,99,56).

== History ==
The flag was created by Laurentian University professor Gaétan Gervais in conjunction with students Michel Dupuis, Donald Obonsawin and Yves Tassé, and was flown for the first time at the University of Sudbury building on 25 September 1975. It was officially adopted as the community's flag by the Association canadienne-française de l'Ontario in 1977.

=== 21st century ===
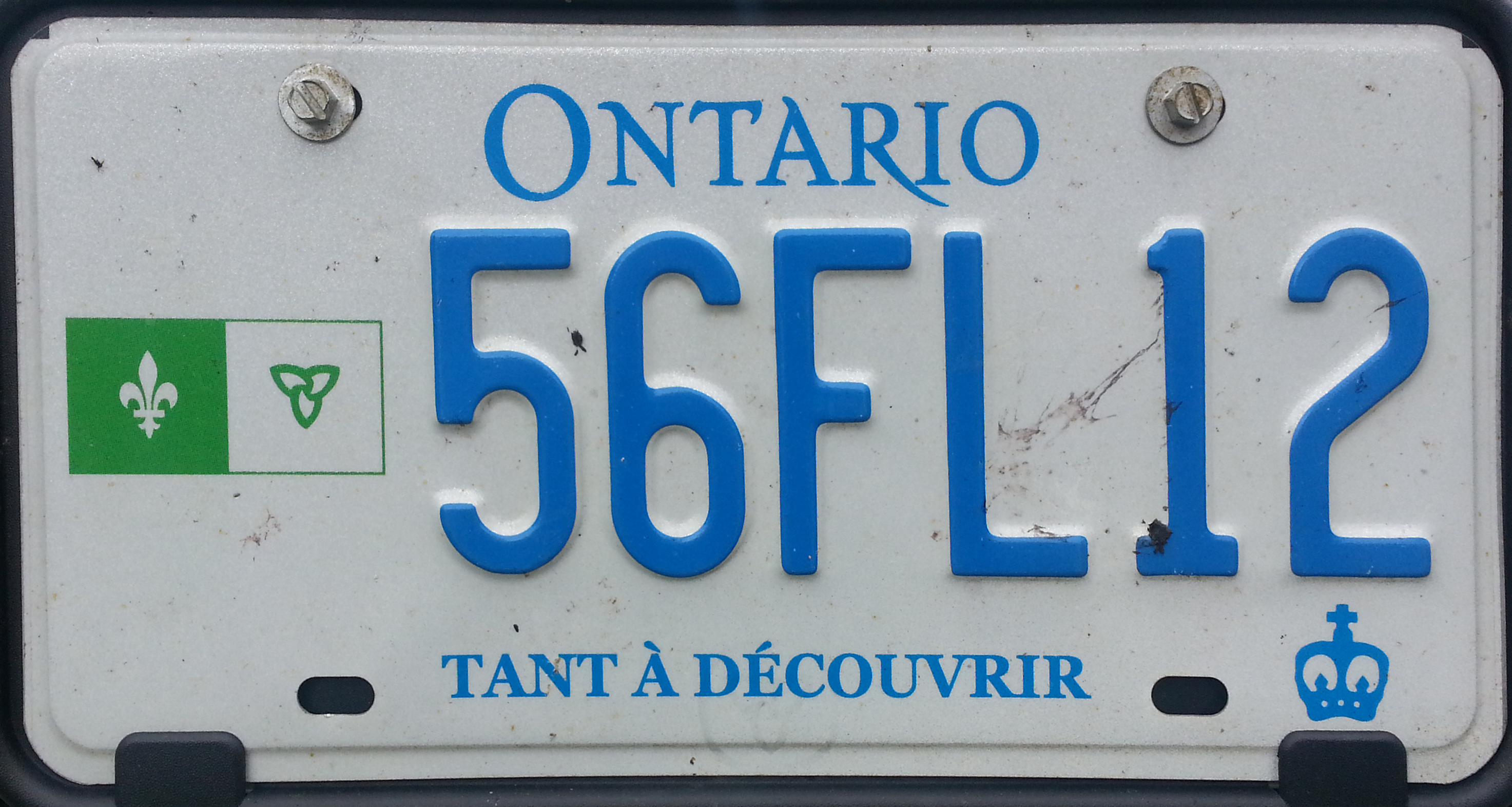
Personalised licence plate with a Franco-Ontarian flag

The Legislative Assembly of Ontario legally recognised it as the official flag of the Franco-Ontarian community with the passage of the Franco-Ontarian Emblem Act of 2001. The flag was made available as a graphic on vehicle registration plates in Ontario in 2003.

In 2003 a controversy arose in Sudbury when the city government voted against flying the flag at Tom Davies Square for St-Jean-Baptiste Day, claiming that it would be inappropriate for the city government to display on public property a symbol representative of only a portion of the city's population. In 2006, new mayor John Rodriguez reversed that decision, permitting the flag to be flown, but was again criticised by some voters for acting unilaterally.

To commemorate the 30th anniversary of the Franco-Ontarian flag in September 2005, Prise de parole, a Sudbury-based publishing house, published a book titled Le Drapeau franco-ontarien (edited by Guy Gaudreau, a history professor at Laurentian University.)

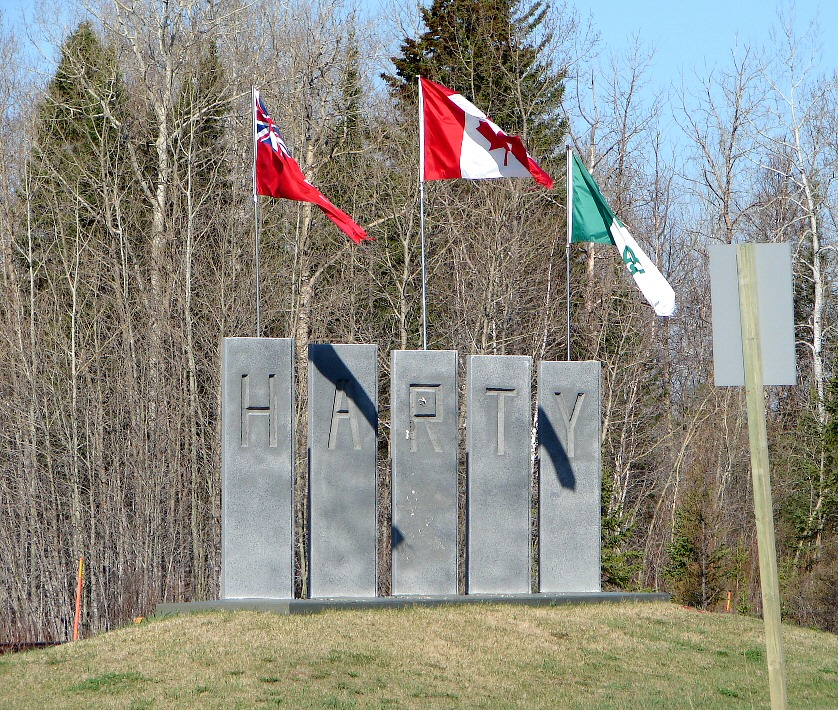
The Franco-Ontarian flag alongside the flag of Ontario and the flag of Canada in Harty, 2007

On September 25, 2006, the largest Franco-Ontarian flag was unfurled in Ottawa. The historical park, also known as Les Monuments de la francophonie d'Ottawa, was built by the francophone community to commemorate francophone contribution in the development and well-being of the City of Ottawa. This first of six Monuments de la francophonie d'Ottawa is dedicated to the subject of education. The flag is 5 x 10 m and was raised on a 27 m pole.

In 2010, the Ontario government designated September 25 as Franco-Ontarian Day. The date was chosen as it represented the anniversary of the flag.

In 2017, the Ontario Heritage Trust placed a permanent historical plaque at the University of Sudbury building to commemorate the creation of the flag.

A variant of the Franco-Ontarian flag

Following the controversial cutbacks to French-language services announced by the government of Doug Ford in 2018, governments in Quebec began to fly the Franco-Ontarian flag as a gesture of solidarity. The flag was hoisted at Montreal City Hall on November 23, and at the National Assembly of Quebec on December 1.

On September 21, 2020, Ontario Parliament passed Amendment to Franco-Ontarian Emblem Act, 2001 proposed by Progressive Conservative MPP from Mississauga Centre, Natalia Kusendova, to designate the Franco-Ontarian flag as an official emblem of Ontario. It received royal assent and became law on September 24, 2020.

== See also ==
- List of Franco-Canadian flags
- Flag of Ontario
- Symbols of Ontario
