= L'Express (Toronto) =

French-language weekly newspaper

- Type: Weekly newspaper
- Format: Berliner
- Owner: L'Express de Toronto Inc.
- Founder: Jean Mazaré
- Publisher: Eric Mazaré
- Editor: François Bergeron
- Founded: March 1976; 49 years ago
- Language: French
- Headquarters: 888 Eastern Ave, Toronto, Ontario
- City: Toronto
- Website: l-express.ca

L'Express, formerly L'Express de Toronto, is a French-language weekly newspaper, published in Toronto, Ontario, Canada. The paper concentrates primarily on local and regional news for Franco-Ontarians in the Greater Toronto Area and Central Ontario, although it has also published a smaller selection of national and international news coverage. It is considered one of the most important francophone media outlets in Canada outside of Quebec; for instance, in Jacques Parizeau's first trip outside of Quebec after winning the 1994 Quebec provincial election, L'Express was the only media outlet besides the national CBC Prime Time News to whom he granted an interview.

The newspaper was founded in 1976 by Jean Mazaré, a student at the Ontario College of Art. The current publisher is Eric Mazaré. Contributing journalists include Aline Ayoub, Jacqueline Brodie, Annik Chalifour, Martin Francoeur, Benoit Legault, Gérard Lévesque, Nathalie Prézeau, Gabriel Racle, Aurélie Resch, Charles-Antoine Rouyer, Paul-François Sylvestre and Monique Telmosse.

In 2018, L'Express was admonished by the Canadian Internet Registration Authority for deceptively using the web domain name lemetropolitain.ca, which closely resembles the lemetropolitain.com domain name of the competing publication Le Métropolitain, to direct readers to L'Express.

== See also ==
- List of newspapers in Canada
- Media in Toronto
