= Michel Bock =

Canadian historian

- Born: Greater Sudbury, Ontario, Canada
- Education: Laurentian University (MA) University of Ottawa (Ph.D)
- Occupation: Historian Professor at the University of Ottawa
- Awards: Governor General's Award (2005)

Michel Bock (born 1971) is a Canadian historian, who specializes in the history of Franco-Ontarian communities and cultures. His book Quand la nation débordait les frontières: les minorités françaises dans la pensée de Lionel Groulx was the winner of the 2005 Governor General's Award in the French language non-fiction category.

He graduated with a master's degree in history in 1996 from Laurentian University, and earned his PhD at the University of Ottawa, where he is now a professor of History.

== Works ==
- Bâtir sur le roc: De l'ACFEO à l'ACFO du Grand Sudbury, 1910-1987 (Prise de parole, 1994, ISBN 978-2-89423-050-3)
- Comment un peuple oublie son nom: La crise identitaire franco-ontarienne et la presse française de Sudbury, 1960-1975 (Prise de parole, 2001)
- L'Ontario français: des Pays-d'en-haut à nos jours (CFORP, 2004)
- Quand la nation débordait les frontières: les minorités françaises dans la pensée de Lionel Groulx (2004)
