= Le Nordir =

Le Nordir was a Canadian book publishing company, active from 1988 to 2012. Based primarily in Ottawa, Ontario, the company specialized in Franco-Ontarian literature, publishing primarily poetry, theatrical plays and non-fiction.

The company was established in 1988 by Robert Yergeau, while he was employed at the Université de Hearst. It moved to Ottawa a couple of years later, after Yergeau joined the faculty of the University of Ottawa.

It ceased publishing in 2012 after Yergeau's death.

Writers published by the company included Daniel Poliquin, Andrée Christensen, Stefan Psenak and François Paré.
