= Altomédia =

Canadian media company

Altomédia is a Canadian media company, which publishes several French-language community weekly newspapers in the Central and Southwestern regions of Ontario for the Franco-Ontarian community. The company's publications include Le Métropolitain in the Greater Toronto Area, L'Action in London, Le Rempart in Windsor and Le Régional in Hamilton-Niagara, as well as Bonjour Ontario, a monthly magazine which reprints content from the weekly publications for distribution outside the company's primary service area.

The company's president is Denis Poirier.

The company was honoured by the Franco-Ontarian Economic Development and Employability Network in 2003 as one of the province's best small and medium businesses serving the province's francophone community, particularly for its advances in electronic production.

== L'Action ==
Published in London, L'Action serves much of Southwestern Ontario apart from the Windsor market, which is served by sister publication Le Rempart.

== Le Métropolitain ==
Le Métropolitain, serving the Greater Toronto Area, was launched in 1983 in Toronto, by Claude Badière, a former sales representative of L'Express de Toronto.

In 2018, the competing publication L'Express was advised by the Canadian Internet Registration Authority to stop using the web domain name lemetropolitain.ca; Le Métropolitain's web domain is lemetropolitain.com.

== Le Régional ==
Le Régional serves the Hamilton market.

== Le Rempart ==
Le Rempart was launched in 1966 by the local Windsor chapter of the Société Saint-Jean-Baptiste. It was acquired by Les Publications des Grands Lacs in 1972, and operated under the editorship of Jean Mongenais until it was acquired by Poirier in 2002.
