= Doric Germain =

Canadian writer and university professor (born 1946)

Doric Germain (born 1946 in Lac-Sainte-Thérèse, Ontario) is a Canadian writer and university professor.

Educated at the University of Ottawa, the Université Laval, and the Université de Hearst. His first novel was published in 1980. From 1970 until his retirement in 2012 he worked as a professor of French literature at Laurentian University's Université de Hearst.

== Works ==
- La Vengeance de l'orignal (1980)
- Le Trappeur du Kabi (1981)
- Poison (1985)
- Le soleil se lève au Nord (1991)
- Défenses légitimes (2003)
