= Rolande Faucher =

Canadian author and community activist (1941–2025)

- Born: 1941; Ottawa, Ontario, Canada
- Died: 15 November 2025 (aged 83–84)
- Occupation(s): Author, activist

Rolande Faucher (1941 – 15 November 2025) was a Canadian author and francophone activist.

Faucher was a key French-language activist for the town of Orleans, Ontario, serving as president of the Mouvement d'implication francophone d'Orléans, as well as the Assemblée de la francophonie de l'Ontario. She received great recognition for her work, including knighthood in the Order of La Pléiade and the Order of Merit of the Association des juristes d'expression française de l'Ontario. In 2008, she published the biography Jean-Robert Gauthier. Convaincre... sans révolution et sans haine, for which she received the Prix Champlain.

Faucher died on 15 November 2025.
