= En Bref =

En Bref is a Canadian folk-rock musical group. Based in Sudbury and North Bay, Ontario, the band consists of vocalist and guitarist Yves Doyon, guitarist Martin Laforest, bassist Scott Aultman and drummer Shawn Sasyniuk.

Formed in 1992, the band performed locally in Northern Ontario, and at francophone music festivals in Ottawa, Montreal and Winnipeg, and won the La Brunante competition for emerging bands in 1994.

They released their self-titled debut album in 1997. They attracted some attention from major record labels, but due to management problems were not signed and broke up for a number of years. In the mid-2000s, they reunited to perform occasional live shows, and independently released a live album recorded at Sudbury's Little Montreal bar in 2012.

Their second studio album, Silence Radio, was released in 2014. The album was promoted with live performances at both Sudbury's La Nuit sur l'étang and Ottawa's Festival Franco-Ontarien.
