= Université de Hearst =

French-language university in Canada

Coordinates: 49°42′27″N 83°39′55.58″W

- Former name: Collège universitaire de Hearst
- Motto: Ut Cognoscante (Latin)
- Motto in English: That They Might Know You
- Type: Public
- Established: 1953 as Séminaire de Hearst, 2021 as an independent university
- Academic affiliations: ACUFC, Universities Canada
- President: Simon Fecteau
- Vice-president: Julie Béchard
- Faculty: 30
- Students: 341 (2025)
- Location: S. P. 580, 60, 9e Rue Hearst (Ontario) P0L 1N0, Hearst, Kapuskasing and Timmins, Ontario, Canada
- Campus: Urban
- Language: French
- Tagline: Repenser son univers
- Website: www.uhearst.ca

Université de Hearst (formerly Collège universitaire de Hearst) is a public French-language university with its main campus in Hearst, Ontario, Canada. The university has additional campuses in Timmins and Kapuskasing.

For most of its history, Hearst was an affiliated school of Laurentian University in Sudbury. It was rechartered as an independent institution on April 1, 2022, following the 2021 Laurentian University financial crisis.

== Programs ==
Université de Hearst offers degree programs taught in French in Liberal Arts such as psychology, business and interdisciplinary studies in Northeastern Ontario's Franco-Ontarian community. Furthermore, it serves as a recruiting pool for the region's elementary and secondary teachers. As of 2016, the university only offers three university degrees.

== Partnership ==
The Université de Hearst is a member of L'Association des collèges et universités de la francophonie canadienne, a network of academic institutions of the Canadian Francophonie.

== Features and buildings ==
The Hearst campus located at 60 9th Street features an amphitheatre, cafeteria and gymnasium. The Maurice-Saulnier library includes a variety of books and periodicals in French and English and a computer lab. The Kapuskasing campus is located at 7 Aurora Avenue. The Timmins campus is located at 395 Theriault Boulevard.

== History ==
The institution was founded in 1953 by Louis Lévesque under the name Séminaire de Hearst. Financed by the population of the Diocese of Hearst, Ontario, its mission was to provide secondary education accessible to the French-speaking youth of the northeast of Ontario.

In 1959 the school was incorporated under the name Collège de Hearst to focus on university studies. It was affiliated with the University of Sudbury in 1957 and later to Laurentian University in 1963. In 1972, it became the Collège universitaire de Hearst and ceased providing college programs to concentrate exclusively on university programs. It was rechartered under Université de Hearst as an independent institution in 2021 following the 2021 Laurentian University financial crisis.

== Student life ==
In addition to providing educational programs, the institution contributes to the Francophone community in Northern Ontario culturally, socially and economically.

== Dormitories ==
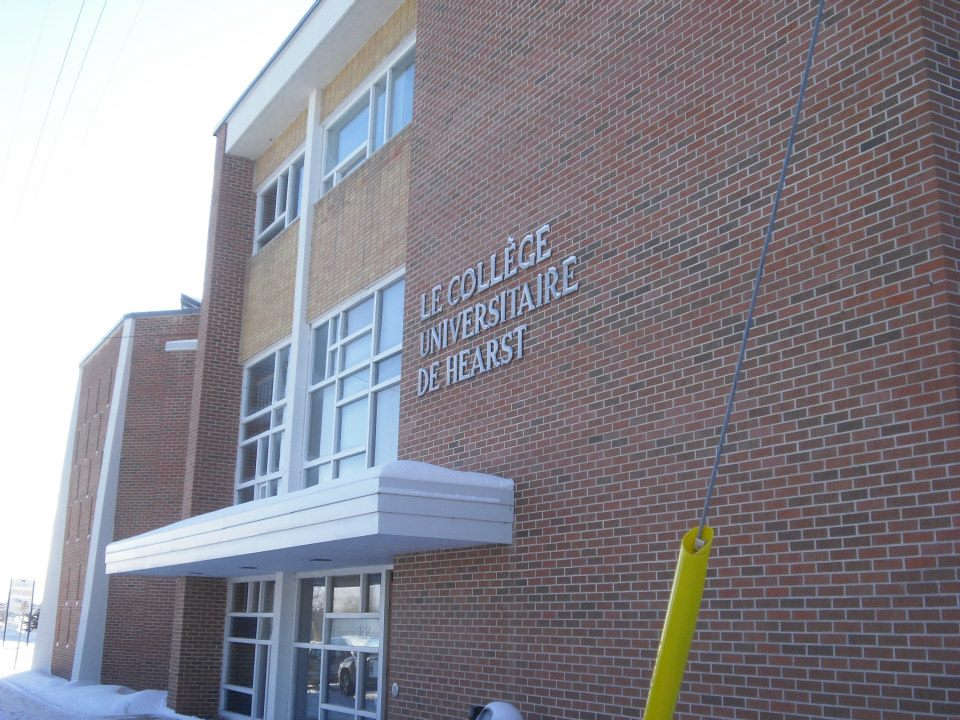
Université de Hearst, Hearst campus

The campus in Hearst features a dormitory on the second floor. The campuses in Kapuskasing and Timmins also have dormitories.
