= Assemblée de la francophonie de l'Ontario =

Canadian activist organization

AFO, or Assemblée de la francophonie de l'Ontario (French pronunciation: [asɑ̃ble də la fʁɑ̃kɔfɔni də lɔ̃taʁjo], Francophone Assembly of Ontario) is a Canadian organization which coordinates the political and cultural activities of the Franco-Ontarian community.

The organization was created in 1910 as the Association canadienne-française d'Éducation de l'Ontario (ACFÉO) to lobby for French language education rights in the province. The organization and the Franco-Ontarian community at large faced a serious early crisis when the provincial government adopted Regulation 17 in 1912, effectively banning the teaching of French in schools. The regulation was never fully implemented because of ACFÉO's litigation, and it was eventually repealed in 1927.

ACFÉO subsequently changed its name to Association canadienne-française de l'Ontario ("Association of French Canadians of Ontario"), or ACFO.

The organization continued to lobby for the improvement of French language services in the province. It was instrumental in the adoption of the French Language Services Act in 1986, and in the creation of Ontario's three francophone colleges: Collège La Cité in Ottawa, Collège Boréal in Sudbury and the defunct Collège des Grands-Lacs in Toronto. As well, ACFO lobbied against the provincial government's planned closure of Ottawa's Montfort Hospital.

In 2004, the organization changed its name to L'Assemblée de la francophonie de l'Ontario, partly to reflect Canadian francophones' modern shift away from identifying as French Canadian. In 2010 / 2011, their revenue was 1.4 million dollars. 1.2 million of that came from various government entities. The organization's current president is Carol Jolin.

== Presidents ==
- 1910-1912 - Napoléon Belcourt
- 1912-1914 - Charles-Siméon-Omer Boudreau
- 1914-1915 - Alphonse Télesphore Charron
- 1915-1919 - Philippe Landry
- 1919-1932 - Napoléon Belcourt
- 1932-1933 - Samuel Genest
- 1933-1934 - Léon-Calixte Raymond
- 1934-1938 - Dr. Paul-Émile Rochon
- 1938-1944 - Adélard Chartrand
- 1944-1953 - Ernest Desormeaux
- 1953-1959 - Gaston Vincent
- 1959-1963 - Aimé Arvisais
- 1963-1971 - Roger N. Séguin
- 1971-1972 - Ryan Paquette
- 1972-1974 - Omer Deslauriers
- 1974-1976 - Jean-Louis Bourdeau
- 1976-1978 - Gisèle Richer
- 1978-1980 - Jeannine Séguin
- 1980-1982 - Yves Saint-Denis
- 1982-1984 - André Cloutier
- 1984-1987 - Serge Plouffe
- 1987-1988 - Jacques Marchand (interim)
- 1988-1990 - Rolande Faucher
- 1990-1994 - Jean Tanguay
- 1994-1997 - André J. Lalonde
- 1997-1999 - Trèva Cousineau
- 1999-2001 - Alcide Gour
- 2001-2004 - Jean-Marc Aubin
- 2004-2005 - Jean Poirier
- 2005-2006 - Simon Lalande (interim)
- 2006-2010 - Mariette Carrier-Fraser
- 2010-2016 - Denis Vaillancourt
- 2016–2022: Carol Jolin
- 2022-présent: Fabien Hébert
