= University of Sudbury =

Bilingual and tri-cultural university in Sudbury, Ontario, Canada

- Université de Sudbury
- Motto: Lucerna ardens et lucens (Latin)
- Motto in English: A torch of glowing radiance
- Type: Public
- Established: 1913 Collège du Sacré-Coeur de Sudbury. Subsequently named the University/Université of Sudbury in 1957.
- Academic affiliations: ACUFC, Universities Canada
- Chancellor: Gérald Michel
- President: Dr. Serge Miville
- Location: 935 Ramsey Lake Road; Sudbury, Ontario; P3E 2C6; 46.4662°N 80.9731°W
- Campus: Urban
- Tagline: Ici, on réussit
- Colours: Blue & Red
- Website: http://www.usudbury.ca/

The University of Sudbury (French: Université de Sudbury) is a French-language and tri-cultural university in Sudbury, Ontario, Canada. It provides undergraduate programming in sciences, health sciences, social sciences and commerce. It was a federated school of Laurentian University until May 1, 2021, when Laurentian terminated its relationships with all of its federated schools as part of the 2021 Laurentian University financial crisis; it was subsequently announced that the University of Sudbury will continue operations as an independent French-language university.

The university is a member of Association des collèges et universités de la francophonie canadienne (Association of Colleges and Universities of the Canadian Francophonie), a network of academic institutions of the Canadian Francophonie.

Founded as a Roman Catholic institution, the university became officially secular in 2021.

== History ==
The university was founded as the Collège du Sacré-Cœur (Sacred Heart College) in 1913 by the Jesuits. Exclusively French from 1916, Sacred Heart College was the centre of education for young Franco-Ontarians for decades since it was the first, and for a long time, the only institution of higher learning in Northern Ontario. In 1957, it changed its name and became the University of Sudbury. In 1959, it became a bilingual university. In 1960, it formed the Catholic component of Laurentian federation.

A plaque was erected by the Ontario Heritage Trust, an agency of the Ministry of Heritage, Sport, Tourism and Culture Industries, at Notre Dame & Kathleen Streets, Sudbury:

Sacred Heart College

The Society of Jesus opened a classical college at this site in 1913. The next year the province granted Sacred Heart College a charter giving it degree-granting powers. At first the college was bilingual, but after 1916 it taught exclusively in French. Sacred Heart College became a centre for the education and formation of young Franco-Ontarian men.

In 1957, it changed its name to the University of Sudbury, and became the Catholic component of Laurentian University, in 1960. The Jesuits continued to teach in the secondary school here until 1967. Sacred Heart College played a major role in the development of the Franco-Ontarian community of northeastern Ontario.

— http://www.ameriquefrancaise.org/en/article-571/Sacred_Heart_College,_Sudbury.html

In 2017, the Ontario Heritage Trust also erected a permanent plaque at the current University of Sudbury location, to commemorate the creation and first raising of the Franco-Ontarian flag:

The Franco-Ontarian Flag

The Franco-Ontarian Flag was first raised at the University of Sudbury on September 25, 1975, at a time when Sudbury was experiencing unprecedented growth in Franco-Ontarian arts and culture. Conceived by Gaétan Gervais, historian at Laurentian University, and student Michel Dupuis, the first flag was made by Jacline England, a student and staff member at the university. Refusing to take sole credit for the flag, its creators hoped that the Franco-Ontarian community would claim it as their own and a committee was formed to promote it. The flag was adopted as a unifying symbol during times of struggle and resistance, such as the Penetanguishene school crisis of 1979 and the SOS Montfort campaign in Ottawa in 1997. In 2001, the Ontario Legislature officially recognized the flag as the emblem of the Ontario French-speaking community. Since 2010, Franco-Ontarian Day has been celebrated annually on September 25. Today, the green and white flag with the French lily and the Ontario trillium endures as the most prominent symbol of the province’s diverse francophone community and represents more than 400 years of the French presence in Ontario.
