= French Language Services Act =

Ontario, Canada statute

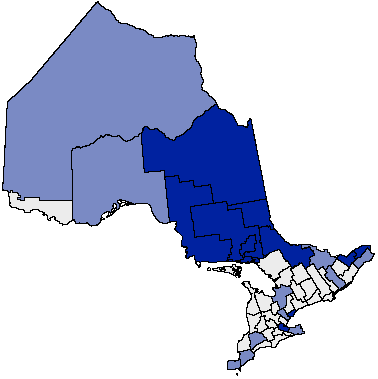
Map of French service areas in Ontario. (Note: The map was last updated in 2010, before Markham was designated under the Act in 2015. As a result, York Region is not coloured light blue.) Dark blue indicates areas designated in their entirety; light blue indicates areas that include designated communities.

The French Language Services Act (French: Loi sur les services en français) is a law in the province of Ontario, Canada, which is intended to protect the rights of Franco-Ontarians, or French-speaking people, in the province.

The Act states that French is official in the courts and in the education sector. The Act does not give the French language full official language status in the province, which has no official language defined in law but is primarily an English-speaking province in practice. The Act, however, ensures that provincial government services are offered in French in 27 designated areas across the province with significant numbers of Franco-Ontarian residents.

== Preamble ==
"Whereas the French language is a historic and honoured language in Ontario and recognized by the Constitution as an official language in Canada; and whereas in Ontario the French language is recognized as an official language in the courts and in education; and whereas the Legislative Assembly recognizes the contribution of the cultural heritage of the French speaking population and wishes to preserve it for future generations; and whereas it is desirable to guarantee the use of the French language in institutions of the Legislature and the Government of Ontario, as provided in this Act."

== History ==
Historically, the Franco-Ontarian community had been ignored or treated with contempt by the government of Ontario, most notably with the adoption in 1912 of Regulation 17, which forbade the use of French as a language of school instruction in Ontario. Regulation 17 was challenged in court by the activist organization Association canadienne-française d'Éducation de l'Ontario (ACFÉO), and was never fully implemented before its repeal in 1927. However, it was not until 1968 that the provincial government amended the Education Act to officially recognize the existence of French language schools in the province.

Over the next number of years, the government began to offer a wider range of services in French. In 1970, a Coordinator of Bilingualism was appointed to oversee the development of French language government services. Over the next 16 years, a large number of service policies were adopted on a piecemeal basis by individual ministries, until the French Language Services Act was introduced in 1986.

== The Act ==
The primary purpose of the Act was to consolidate and formalize government policies and regulations around the provision of French language services. The Act guaranteed francophones in 26 designated areas of the province a right to local French services from the provincial government. Two more cities were designated as French language service areas after the Act came into effect.

Francophones living outside of the designated areas can receive services in French by accessing government services located in the designated areas or by directly contacting the head offices of government ministries. The provision and coordination of French language services is managed by the Ministry of Francophone Affairs.

The French Language Services Act does not cover public agencies such as hospitals, nursing homes or the Children's Aid Society. However, these agencies may ask to be officially designated as providers of services in French by the Cabinet. Once designated, the agencies must provide French-language services just as the ministries do. Other partially funded provincial and municipal agencies may develop their own policies regarding French language services. For instance, Ontario public libraries within FLSA designated areas are not bound by the Act; however, Ontario's Public Libraries Act's section 20 (b) states that public library boards "shall seek to provide library services in the French language, where appropriate".

The Act also does not legislate any responsibilities upon individual municipalities to provide French language services, although a municipality may choose to do so of its own accord.

The Act was introduced in 1986 by Bernard Grandmaître, Minister of Francophone Affairs in the Liberal government of David Peterson, and passed successfully. It provided for a three-year implementation period, and the law officially came into effect on November 18, 1989.

In November 2021, it was announced that the Act would be modernized. As a first phase they streamlined the process to apply to become a designation French providing business. They as updated government identification to now allow the use of French characters.

== Ensuring compliance ==
In 2007, the Office of the French Language Services Commissioner was the agency whose primary mandate was to ensure compliance with the French Language Services Act in the delivery of government services by means of independent investigations. The Commissioner received and handled complaints from the public with respect to inadequate French-language services from the Ontario government. Recommendations are outlined in a publicly available annual report to the Minister Responsible for Francophone Affairs.

Under legislative changes that came into effect on May 1, 2019, the position of the French Language Services Commissioner was eliminated and all of his responsibilities were transferred to the Ombudsman. The Ombudsman now has a French Language Services Commissioner at the Deputy Ombudsman level, and a dedicated unit within their office for this work.

The Ombudsman’s jurisdiction and powers of investigation now include ensuring that the rights of Ontarians and the obligations of government agencies are respected according to the French Language Services Act.

== Designated areas ==
In order for an area to obtain designation, Francophones must make up at least 10% of its population, or urban centres must have at least 5,000 francophones. Previous to 2009, the definition of a francophone in Ontario included only native French speakers. This definition was broadened by the Government of Ontario in June 2009 "to better reflect the changing face and diversity of Ontario's Francophone communities." The new Inclusive Definition of Francophones (IDF) now includes allophones, "those whose mother tongue is neither French nor English but have particular knowledge of French as an official language and use French at home, including many recent immigrants to Ontario for whom French is the language of integration." Due to the alternative of the 5,000 population threshold, large cities that have very low francophone population percentages, such as Toronto (population 2,731,571) or Brampton (population 593,638) are nonetheless designated areas.

=== Districts and counties ===
- Algoma District
- Cochrane District
- Nipissing District
- Prescott and Russell United Counties
- Sudbury District
- Timiskaming District

=== Municipalities ===
- Belle River
- Brampton
- Callander
- Colchester North
- Cornwall
- Essa
- Greater Sudbury
- Greenstone
- Hamilton
- Ignace
- Kingston
- Lakeshore
- Laurentian Valley
- London
- Maidstone
- Manitouwadge
- Marathon
- Markham
- Mississauga
- North Glengarry
- North Stormont
- Ottawa
- Pembroke
- Penetanguishene
- Port Colborne
- Sarnia
- South Glengarry
- South Stormont
- Stafford
- Tecumseh
- Terrace Bay
- Tilbury
- Tiny
- Toronto
- Welland
- Whitewater Region
- Winchester
- Windsor

=== Expansion of services ===
Brampton was designated as the province's 24th bilingual service centre in 2004, and the designation officially came into effect in March 2007. Kingston was designated as the 25th bilingual service centre in May 2006, and French services officially came into effect in 2009. Markham was designated as the 26th bilingual service centre in June 2015, and French services officially came into effect on July 1, 2018. Sarnia was designated as the 27th bilingual service centre in December, 2021, and French services were scheduled to officially come into effect in November 2024.

== Law application ==
The Hawkesbury detachment of the Ontario Provincial Police became the first in Ontario to be fully operational in English and French in December 2012.

== Controversy ==
The Act was controversial with anti-bilingualism advocates such as the Alliance for the Preservation of English in Canada (APEC), who alleged that it created a special entitlement for francophones at the expense of anglophone residents of the province as the requirement to provide bilingual services was perceived to discriminate against government employees who did not speak French.

APEC also misrepresented or misunderstood the reality that the legislation did not cover municipal government services, and it began a campaign of persuading Ontario municipalities to declare themselves English-only. A number of smaller municipalities, especially in the Western Ontario region, did so during the implementation period. On January 29, 1990, the most famous such resolution was passed in Sault Ste. Marie, igniting a national controversy which in turn became a flashpoint in the Meech Lake Accord debate. (See Sault Ste. Marie language resolution.)

On November 18, 1996, New Democrat MPP Gilles Bisson spoke in French in the Legislative Assembly to mark the 10th anniversary of the Act's passage. He was heckled by Progressive Conservative opponent Joe Spina, who yelled at Bisson to "Speak English!"
