= 2018 Cochrane District municipal elections =

Elections were held in the organized municipalities in the Cochrane District of Ontario on October 22, 2018 in conjunction with municipal elections across the province. (X) denotes an incumbent candidate.

== Black River-Matheson ==
=== Mayor ===
Mayoral Candidate	Vote	%
Gilles Laderoute	514	52.66
Douglas Bender	462	47.34

=== Town Council ===
Candidate	Vote	%
Ward 1
DUBIEN, Willie	51	75.0
DUCIAUME, Laurier (X)	17	25.0
Ward 2
GIBSON, Jenny	133	85.8
HOUGH, Eleanor	22	14.2
Ward 3
CUMMING, Carrie	245	64.6
BARBER, J.A. (X)	134	35.4
Ward 4
DE MARCHI, Daniel	Acclaimed	
Ward 5
CHARLEBOIS, Cleo	Acclaimed	
Ward 6
RIACH, Kyla	Acclaimed	

== Cochrane ==
=== Mayor ===
Mayoral Candidate	Vote	%
Denis Clement	981	45.33
Peter Politis (X)	976	45.10
Lawrence Martin	207	9.57

=== Town Council ===
Candidate 6 to be elected	Vote	%
BELISLE, Daniel	807	37.3
BERNIER, Stephanie	359	16.6
BOURASSA, Claude (X)	688	31.8
BREATHAT, Dean	767	35.4
BRISSON, Reynald	350	16.2
CALAIEZZI, Todd	986	45.6
DUMOULIN, Michael	326	15.1
HENDERSON, Shea	791	36.6
HOOGENHOUD, Rodney	1021	47.2
HUTCHINSON, Robert	778	36.0
MAGEAU, Jamie	141	6.5
NELSON, Susan Daisy	376	17.4
O'CONNOR, Desmond	852	39.4
OWENS, Darryl (X)	546	25.2
RECOSKIE, Marck H.	607	28.0
SISCO, Frank (X)	717	33.1
SKIDMORE-FOX, Jane (X)	589	27.2
ULVSTAL, Scott	382	17.7

== Hearst ==
List of candidates:

=== Mayor ===
Mayoral Candidate	Vote	%
Roger Sigouin (X)	1,397	83.85
Yvan Lacagé	269	16.15

=== Town Council ===
Candidate 6 to be elected	Vote	%
BAILLARGEON, Gaetan	1123	67,4
BROCHU, Claude	660	39,6
LAUZON, Joel	1015	60,9
LEMAIRE, Daniel (X)	830	49,8
MORIN, Conrad (X)	911	54,7
PROULX, Robert	824	49,5
RINGUETTE, Marc	1151	69,1
VACHON, Josee	1365	81,9
VERMETTE, Raymond (X)	584	35,1

== Fauquier-Strickland ==
=== Mayor ===
Mayoral Candidate	Vote	%
Madeleine Tremblay (X)	197	76.4
Daniel Michaud	61	23.6

=== Town Council ===
Candidate 3 to be elected	Vote	%
ALBERT, Sylvie (X)	83	9.0
BRUNET, Roger (X)	140	15.1
DEMERS, Jaques	133	14.4
GAGNON, Sylvain	59	6.4
KUCHERAN, Anne-Lynn (X)	89	9.6
MARCOUX, Jean-Guy	185	20.0
MARCOUX, Priscilla	178	19.2
TREMBLAY, Lionel	58	6.3

== Iroquois Falls ==
List of candidates:

=== Mayor ===
Mayoral Candidate	Vote	%
Pat Britton	511	26.82
Betty Lou Purdon	435	22.83
Michael Shea (X)	380	19.95
Jim Brown	360	18.90
Roger Hardy	219	11.50

=== Town Council ===
Candidate 6 to be elected	Vote	%
BOUCHER, Terry Lou (X)	1266	66,6
COCKBURN, Dave	1123	59,0
CYBLOSKY, Darcy	1313	69,0
DELAURIER, Tory (X)	1266	66,6
FOURNIER, Gilbert Jack	786	41,3
KENNEDY, Colin (X)	1044	54,9
MADDEN, Jeff (X)	1265	66,5

== Kapuskasing ==
List of candidates:

=== Mayor ===
Mayoral Candidate	Vote	%
David Plourde	1,335	44.18
Gilbert Peters	1,070	35.41
Vic Fournel	510	16.88
Ron St Aubin	107	3.54

=== Town Council ===
Candidate 6 to be elected	Vote	%
BOUCHER, Julien	1157	38,3
CREDGER, Martin (X)	1092	36,1
CZUBA, Ted	691	22,9
DAGGETT, Bob	328	10,9
DINNISSEN, Martin (X)	985	32,6
FORTIER, Joey	758	25,1
LAFLEUR, Rick (X)	1066	35,3
LESSARD, Sebastien	1296	42,9
MUNNOCH, Ken	1624	53,7
NEWTON, Bruce	1067	35,3
ROBINSON, Jodi	413	13,7
SCHERER, Guylaine	1210	40,0
SIEBERT, Frank (X)	1001	33,1
THEBERGE, Gilles	456	15,1
VALLIERE, Marcel	471	15,6

== Mattice-Val Côté ==
=== Mayor ===
Mayoral Candidate	Vote	%
Marc Dupuis	247	78.91
Michel Briere (X)	66	21.09

== Moonbeam ==
=== Mayor ===
Mayoral Candidate	Vote	%
Nicole Fortier Levesque	352	44.78
Murielle Turcotte	264	33.59
Luc Léonard	170	21.63

== Moosonee ==
Mayoral Candidate	Vote	%
Wayne Taipale (X)	Acclaimed	

== Opasatika ==
Mayoral Candidate	Vote	%
Denis Dorval	83	59.71
Benoit Martel	56	40.29

== Smooth Rock Falls ==
=== Mayor ===
Mayoral Candidate	Vote	%
Michel Arseneault	Acclaimed	

=== Town Council ===
Candidate 4 to be elected	Vote	%
ALIE, Daniel (X)	337	24.0
BLAIS, Marc (X)	327	23.2
LANDRY, Joanne (X)	193	13.7
PERRAS, Sue (X)	278	19.8
ROBERTS, Patrick	271	19.3

== Timmins ==
List of candidates:

Results are as follows:

=== Mayor ===
Mayoral Candidate	Vote	%
George Pirie	10,323	63.92
Steve Black (X)	5,525	34.21
Raymond Burey	109	0.67
Daniel Fortier	103	0.64
Lauchlan K. MacInnes	90	0.56

=== Timmins City Council ===
Candidate	Vote	%
Ward 1
Rock Whissell	2,316	74.04
Veronica Farrell (X)	644	20.59
Ken Pye	168	5.37
Ward 2
Mickey Auger	526	38.48
Lorne Feldman	440	32.19
Walter Wawrzaszek (X)	319	23.34
Jean Fex	82	6.00
Ward 3
Joe Campbell (X)	459	55.04
Donna Dorrington	270	32.37
Carter Lucyk	105	12.59
Ward 4
John Patrick Curley	793	43.62
Pat Bamford (X)	397	21.84
Jessica Trudel	340	18.70
David Gerald Shale	288	15.84
Ward 5 4 to be elected
Kristin Murray	3,369	11.82
Michelle Boileau	3,280	11.51
Noella Rinaldo (X)	3,253	11.41
Andrew Marks (X)	2,637	9.25
Cory Robin	2,635	9.25
J.J. Doody (X)	2,501	8.78
Rick Dubeau (X)	2,427	8.52
Alex Szczebonski	2,378	8.34
Jason Sereda	1,892	6.64
John Roy	1,681	5.90
Karina Miki Douglas-Takayesu	1,493	5.24
John Ivanovs	955	3.35

== Val Rita-Harty ==
=== Mayor ===
Mayoral Candidate	Vote	%
Johanne Baril (X)	186	60.98
Laurier Bourgeois	119	39.02
