= 2022 Cochrane District municipal elections =

- October 24, 2022

Elections were held in the organized municipalities in the Cochrane District of Ontario on October 24, 2022, in conjunction with municipal elections across the province.

The following are the results of the mayoral races in each municipality and the council races in the City of Timmins. (X) denotes an incumbent candidate.

== Black River-Matheson ==
=== Mayor ===
Doug Bender was elected mayor of Black River-Matheson by acclamation.

Mayoral Candidate	Vote	%
Doug Bender	Acclaimed	

== Cochrane ==
=== Mayor ===
The following were the results for mayor of Cochrane.

Mayoral Candidate	Vote	%
Peter Politis	1,397	68.61
Denis Clement (X)	639	31.39

== Hearst ==
=== Mayor ===
Roger Sigouin, who has been mayor of Hearst since 2002, was challenged by Edward Williamson.

Mayoral Candidate	Vote	%
Roger Sigouin (X)	965	83.62
Edward Williamson	189	16.38

== Fauquier-Strickland ==
The following were the results for mayor of Fauquier-Strickland.

=== Mayor ===
Mayoral Candidate	Vote	%
Madeleine Tremblay (X)	174	57.43
Robert Courchesne	129	42.57

== Iroquois Falls ==
=== Mayor ===
The following were the results for mayor of Iroquois Falls.

Mayoral Candidate	Vote	%
Tory Delaurier (X)	1,209	72.31
Roger Hardy	463	27.69

== Kapuskasing ==
Dave Plourde was re-elected as mayor of Kapuskasing by acclamation.

=== Mayor ===
Mayoral Candidate	Vote	%
David Plourde (X)	Acclaimed	

== Mattice-Val Côté ==
=== Mayor ===
The following were the results for mayor of Mattice-Val Côté.

Mayoral Candidate	Vote	%
Marc Dupuis (X)	189	64.95
Gaetan Garneau	102	35.05

== Moonbeam ==
=== Mayor ===
The following were the results for mayor of Moonbeam.

Mayoral Candidate	Vote	%
Eric Côté	319	53.17
Nicole Fortier Levesque (X)	281	46.83

== Moosonee ==
=== Mayor ===
The following were the results for mayor of Moosonee.

Mayoral Candidate	Vote	%
Wayne Taipale (X)	226	51.95'
Randy Cota	121	27.82
Jennifer Tozer	88	20.23

== Opasatika ==
=== Mayor ===
Jacques Dorval was elected mayor of Opasatika by acclamation.

Mayoral Candidate	Vote	%
Jacques Dorval	Acclaimed	

== Smooth Rock Falls ==
=== Mayor ===
The following were the results for mayor of Smooth Rock Falls.

Mayoral Candidate	Vote	%
Patrick Roberts	294	46.08
Sue Perras (X)	290	45.45
Kevin Somer	54	8.46

== Timmins ==
The following are the results for mayor and city council of Timmins.

=== Mayor ===
Kristin Murray was mayor of Timmins since being appointed in August 2022. The previous mayor, George Pirie was elected in the 2022 Ontario general election for the Progressive Conservative Party of Ontario on June 2, 2022.

Mayoral Candidate	Vote	%
Michelle Boileau	7,403	61.47
Joe Campbell	3,863	32.07
Richard Lafleur	778	6.46

=== Timmins City Council ===
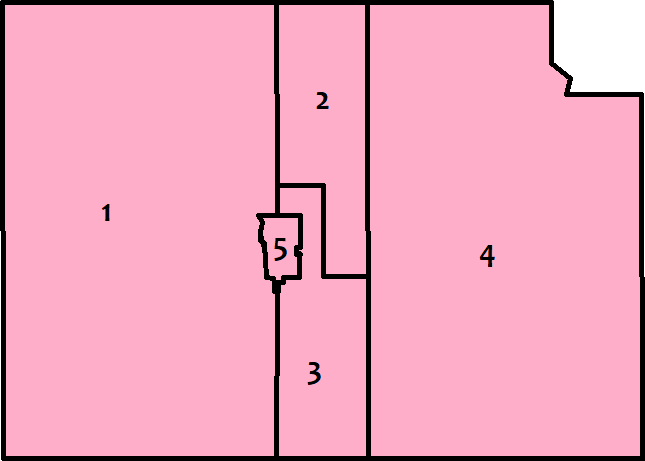
Map of Timmins' five wards

In Wards 1 to 4, the councillor is elected through First-past-the-post voting, with each voter casting just one vote. About a thousand votes were cast in each, barring Ward 1, which was decided by acclamation. In Ward 5, the seats are filled through Plurality block voting with each voter casting up to four votes. With about four times the population of each of the other wards, Ward 5 saw 21,000 votes cast.

Candidate	Vote	%
Ward 1
Rock Whissell (X)	Acclaimed	
Ward 2
Lorne Feldman	449	46.48
Mickey Auger (X)	331	34.27
Marcus Niebler	186	19.25
Ward 3
Bill Gvozdanovic	372	51.96
Carter Lucyk	294	41.06
Sylvin Lacroix	50	6.98
Ward 4
John Patrick Curley (X)	645	47.99
Kenneth Karl Stenbrunner	370	27.53
Tim Jamieson	329	24.48
Ward 5 4 to be elected
Kristin Murray	3,965	18.45
Steve Black	3,801	17.69
Andrew Marks (X)	2,800	13.03
Cory Robin (X)	2,370	11.03
Veronica Farrell	1,900	8.84
Rick Dubeau	1,750	8.14
Caroline Martel	1,696	7.89
Neil David Siblall	1,463	6.81
Edge Stecewicz	1,336	6.22
James McMahon	410	1.91

== Val Rita-Harty ==
=== Mayor ===
The following were the results for mayor of Val Rita-Harty.

Mayoral Candidate	Vote	%
Johanne Baril (X)	165	57.09
Rosane Parent	124	42.91
