= Mattice (disambiguation) =

Mattice is a community in the Canadian province of Ontario.

Mattice may also refer to:

- William Mattice (1798-1881), Canadian politician
- William D. Mattice (1829-61), Canadian politician
- Harry Sandlin Mattice Jr. (1954-), United States district judge

== See also ==
- Hortense Mattice Gordon (1886-1961), Canadian artist
- Warren Mattice Anderson (1915-2007), American politician
