= 2010 Cochrane District municipal elections =

Elections were held in the organized municipalities in the Cochrane District of Ontario on October 25, 2010, in conjunction with municipal elections across the province.

== Black River-Matheson ==
Incumbent mayor Mike Milinkovich was narrowly re-elected in Black River-Matheson, winning just 22 votes more than challenger Joanne Barber in a race that was very nearly an even three-way split. Five of the township's six councillors, Willie Dubien, Darrell Pettefer, Jerry Cashmore, Bob Renaud and Gisele Desmarais, won by acclamation; André Gadoury won over Charmaine Moffat to take the only contested council seat.

Mayoral Candidate	Vote	%
Mike Milinkovich (X)	387	36.75
Joanne Barber	365	34.66
Diane Pearson	301	28.58
Ward 6 Candidate	Vote	%
André Gadoury	114	70.81
Charmaine Moffat	47	29.19

== Cochrane ==
Peter Politis was elected mayor of Cochrane. Jane Skidmore-Fox, Robert Hutchinson, Darryl Owens, Gilles Chartrand, Bob Bawtinhimer and Christina Farquhar-Leigh were elected to council.

Mayoral Candidate	Vote	%
Peter Politis	850	
Ray Brisson	619	
Jean-Paul Lajeunesse	298	
Helmut Ucke	268	
Gunny Hotte	85	

== Fauquier-Strickland ==
There were no council elections in Fauquier-Strickland, as the entire council, consisting of mayor Madeleine Tremblay and councillors Gilles Fortin, Gilles Pineault, Roger Brunet and Sylvie Albert, won by acclamation.

Mayoral Candidate	Vote	%
Madeleine Tremblay (X)	Acclaimed	

== Hearst ==
Incumbent mayor Roger Sigouin was re-elected in Hearst. Only two of the town's six incumbent councillors, André Rhéaume and Marc Dufresne, ran for re-election to their council seats; two councillors, Katrina Carrera and Marc Dupuis, challenged Sigouin in the mayoral race, and two incumbents did not seek re-election. Both Rhéaume and Dufresne were re-elected to council, and will be joined by new councillors Jonathan Blier, Daniel Lemaire, Conrad Morin and Gaétan Longval.

Mayoral Candidate	Vote	%
Roger Sigouin (X)	1,616	
Katrina Carrera	589	
Marc Dupuis	231	

== Iroquois Falls ==
Incumbent mayor Gilles Forget was re-elected in Iroquois Falls. Michael Shea, Tory Delaurier, Terry Boucher, Pat Britton, Gilbert Fournier and Yves Carrière were elected to council.

Mayoral Candidate	Vote	%
Gilles Forget (X)	1,439	67%
Jim Brown	555	26%
Nick Kuzmich	153	7%

== Kapuskasing ==
Incumbent mayor Alan Spacek was acclaimed back into office in Kapuskasing. Emilie Lemieux, David Plourde, Laurier Guillemette, Martin Credger, Martin Dinnissen and Yvon Guertin were elected to council.

Mayoral Candidate	Vote	%
Alan Spacek (X)	Acclaimed	

== Mattice-Val Côté ==
Incumbent mayor Jean-Louis Brunet was acclaimed back into office in Mattice-Val Côté; however, all of the town's incumbent councillors were defeated. The new council will consist of Michel Brier, Nathalie Lamoreaux, Richard Lemay and Réjean Mitron.

Mayoral Candidate	Vote	%
Jean-Louis Brunet (X)	Acclaimed	

== Moonbeam ==
Incumbent mayor Gilles Audet was re-elected in Moonbeam over challenger Henriette Lapointe.

Mayoral Candidate	Vote	%
Gilles Audet (X)	~350	92
Henriette Lapointe	~40	8

== Moosonee ==
Victor Mitchell defeated incumbent mayor Wayne Taipale in Moosonee. Sandra Linklater, Pauline Sackaney, Bob Gravel and Arthur McComb were elected to council.

Mayoral Candidate	Vote	%
Victor Mitchell	205	
Wayne Taipale (incumbent)	184	
James R. Smoke	45	

== Opasatika ==
In Opasatika, challenger Françoise Lambert defeated incumbent mayor Donald Nolet by just two votes. Linda Lallier, Linda Tremblay, Ghislain Doste and Aline Dallaire were elected to council.

Mayoral Candidate	Vote	%
Françoise Lambert	~88	
Donald Nolet (X)	~86	

== Smooth Rock Falls ==
Incumbent mayor Michel Arsenault was returned by acclamation in Smooth Rock Falls. However, almost all of the town's council will be newly elected; Daniel Alie, Gratien Bernier and Joanne Landry will join returning incumbent Sue Perras.

Mayoral Candidate	Vote	%
Michel Arsenault	Acclaimed	

== Timmins ==
Incumbent mayor Tom Laughren was re-elected in Timmins.

Timmins City Council consists of eight councillors, who are elected to five wards. One councillor represents each of the rural neighbourhoods of Mountjoy, Schumacher, Porcupine and South Porcupine, while four at-large councillors represent the city's urban core.

In the council race, three of the four incumbent rural councillors were reelected; Ward 3 councillor Billy Gvozdanovic ran for re-election in the downtown ward, leaving an open seat in Schumacher. The seat was won by Noella Rinaldo, who will be the only woman on the city council in the upcoming term. Gvozdanovic was defeated in Ward 5, along with two of the ward's incumbent councillors; one other incumbent, Denis Saudino, did not run for re-election. Instead, the ward elected three new councillors, Todd Lever, Andrew Marks and Steven Black, along with incumbent councillor and former mayor Michael Doody.

Mayoral Candidate	Vote	%
Tom Laughren (X)	10,530	89.62
Alan Manchester	1,220	10.38
Ward 1 Candidate	Vote	%
Gary Skripnick (X)	838	39.47
Veronica Farrell	756	35.61
Frank Pontarelli	529	24.92
Ward 2 Candidate	Vote	%
John Curley (X)	587	55.69
Mickey Auger	467	44.31
Ward 3 Candidate	Vote	%
Noella Rinaldo	469	63.98
Lou Battochio	165	22.51
Chad Portelance	52	7.09
Remi Villars	47	6.41
Ward 4 Candidate	Vote	%
Pat Bamford (X)	736	54.56
Norm Bolduc	613	45.44
Ward 5 Candidate	Vote	%
Todd Lever	3,864	19.07
Michael Doody (incumbent)	3,601	17.77
Andrew Marks	2,894	14.28
Steven Black	2,758	13.61
Stephen Adams (incumbent)	2,647	13.06
Jack Slattery (incumbent)	2,294	11.32
Billy Gvozdanovic (incumbent)	2,205	10.88

== Val Rita-Harty ==
Incumbent mayor Laurier Bourgeois was acclaimed back into office in Val Rita-Harty. Alain Tremblay, Allain Dandenault, Roger Lachance and Justin Murray were elected to council.

Reeve Candidate	Vote	%
Laurier Bourgeois (X)	Acclaimed	
