= 2014 Cochrane District municipal elections =

Elections were held in the organized municipalities in the Cochrane District of Ontario on October 27, 2014 in conjunction with municipal elections across the province.

== Black River-Matheson ==
| Mayoral Candidate | Vote | % |
|---|---|---|
| Garry Edwards | 666 | 62.36 |
| Mike Milinkovich (X) | 402 | 37.64 |

== Cochrane ==
| Mayoral Candidate | Vote | % |
|---|---|---|
| Peter Politis (X) | 786 | 39.24 |
| Denis Clement | 687 | 34.30 |
| Robert Hutchinson | 353 | 17.62 |
| Reynald Brisson | 177 | 8.84 |

== Hearst ==
| Mayoral Candidate | Vote | % |
|---|---|---|
| Roger Sigouin (X) | Acclaimed | |

== Fauquier-Strickland ==
| Mayoral Candidate | Vote | % |
|---|---|---|
| Madeleine Tremblay (X) | Acclaimed | |

== Iroquois Falls ==
| Mayoral Candidate | Vote | % |
|---|---|---|
| Michael Shea | 765 | 39.64 |
| Pat Britton | 733 | 37.98 |
| Ken Graham | 432 | 22.38 |

== Kapuskasing ==
| Mayoral Candidate | Vote | % |
|---|---|---|
| Alan Spacek (X) | Acclaimed | |

== Mattice-Val Côté ==
| Mayoral Candidate | Vote | % |
|---|---|---|
| Michel Briere (X) | 144 | 51.06 |
| Maurice Tanguay | 138 | 48.94 |

== Moonbeam ==
| Mayoral Candidate | Vote | % |
|---|---|---|
| Gilles Audet (X) | 460 | 55.02 |
| Gilbert Peters | 376 | 44.98 |

== Moosonee ==
| Mayoral Candidate | Vote | % |
|---|---|---|
| Wayne Taipale | 260 | 67.01 |
| Janice Soltys | 57 | 14.69 |
| Alfred Victor Mitchell (X) | 36 | 9.28 |
| James Smoke | 35 | 9.02 |

== Opasatika ==
| Mayoral Candidate | Vote | % |
|---|---|---|
| Donald Nolet | 125 | 70.62 |
| Francoise Lambert (X) | 52 | 29.38 |

== Smooth Rock Falls ==
| Mayoral Candidate | Vote | % |
|---|---|---|
| Michel Arsenault (X) | Acclaimed | |

== Timmins ==
| Mayoral Candidate | Vote | % |
|---|---|---|
| Steve Black | 8,802 | 64.58 |
| Todd Lever | 4,510 | 33.09 |
| Allan R. Manchester | 318 | 2.33 |

== Val Rita-Harty ==
| Mayoral Candidate | Vote | % |
|---|---|---|
| Johanne Baril | 231 | 56.76 |
| Laurier Bourgeois (X) | 176 | 43.24 |
