= List of mayors of Timmins =

Mayor of Timmins
- Incumbent; Michelle Boileau since December 1, 2022
- Member of: Timmins City Council
- Term length: 4 years, renewable
- Salary: CA$108,893 (2024)

This is a list of mayors of Timmins, Ontario.

- W.H. Wilson – 1912–1916
- J.P. McLaughlin – 1917–1918
- Dr. J.A. McInnis – 1918–1925
- E.G. Dickson- 1926
- E.L. Longmore – 1927–1928
- G.S. Drew – 1929–1933
- R. Richardson – 1934–1935
- J.P. Bartleman – 1936–1939
- J. Emile Brunette – 1940–1947
- Karl Eyre – 1948–1949
- P. Fay – 1950–1951
- J. Wilf Spooner – 1952–1955
- Leo Del Villano – 1956–1959
- J. Emile Brunette – 1960
- Leo Del Villano – 1961–1966
- J.J. Evans – 1967–1968
- Leo Del Villano – 1968–1977
- Michael Doody – 1977–1980
- Victor M. Power – 1980–1988
- Dennis Welin – 1988–1991
- Victor M. Power – 1991–2000
- Jamie Lim – 2000–2003
- Victor M. Power – 2003–2006
- Tom Laughren – 2006–2014
- Steve Black – 2014–2018
- George Pirie – 2018–2022
- Kristin Murray – 2022 (acting)
- Michelle Boileau – 2022–present

Until 1960, years represent those annual councils over which each mayor presided, and a calendar year may or may not exactly have corresponded with terms in office.
