= List of rivers of Canada =

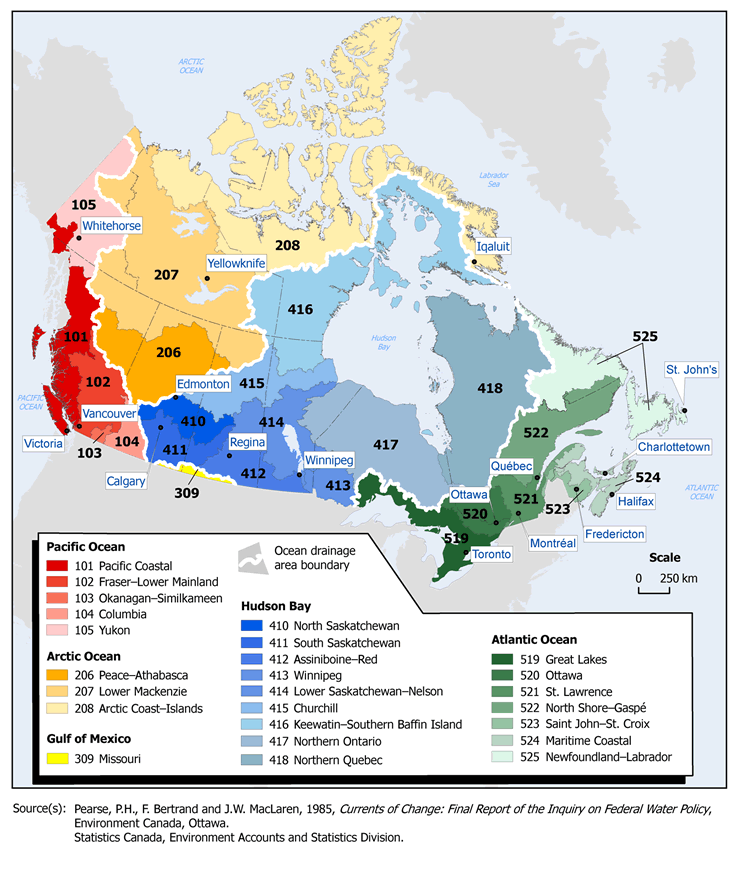
Drainage basins of Canada

The list of rivers of Canada is organized by drainage basin and province.

== Canadian drainage basins ==
The major Canadian drainage basins are the following:

- Arctic Ocean
- Pacific Ocean
- Hudson Bay including James Bay and Ungava Bay
- Atlantic Ocean including the Great Lakes-St. Lawrence Drainage basin
- Gulf of Mexico by the Mississippi River basin

== Rivers by drainage basins ==
- Pacific Ocean
- Arctic Ocean
- Hudson Bay
- Canada Atlantic

== Rivers by Canadian provinces and territories ==
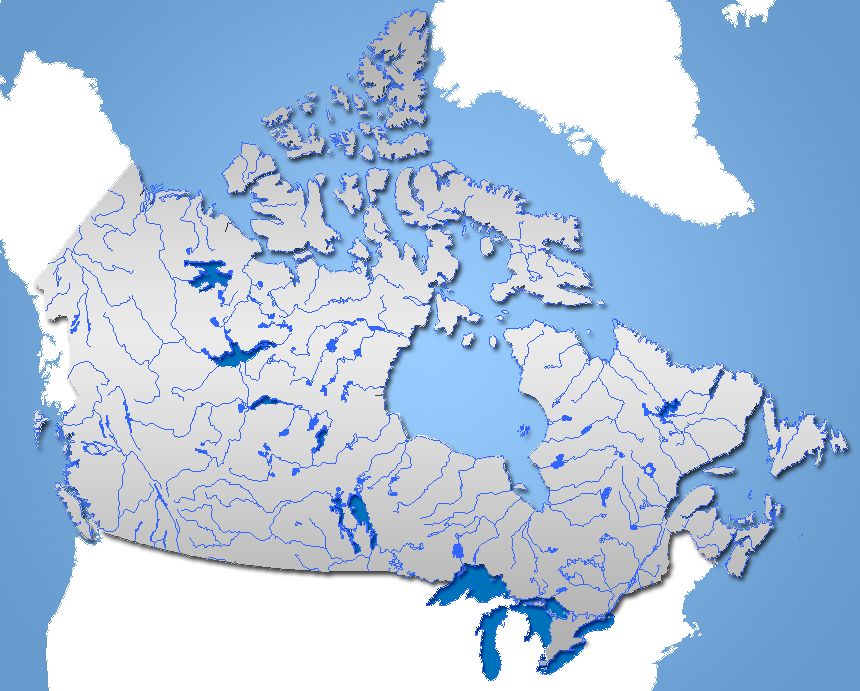
- List of rivers of Alberta
- List of rivers of British Columbia
- List of rivers of Manitoba
- List of rivers of New Brunswick
- List of rivers of Newfoundland and Labrador
- List of rivers of the Northwest Territories
- List of rivers of Nova Scotia
- List of rivers of Nunavut
- List of rivers of Ontario
- List of rivers of Prince Edward Island
- List of rivers of Quebec
- List of rivers of Saskatchewan
- List of rivers of Yukon

== See also ==
- Canadian Rivers Day
- Geography of Canada
- List of longest rivers of Canada
- List of rivers of the Americas
- List of rivers of the Americas by coastline
