= Gilles Bisson =

Canadian politician

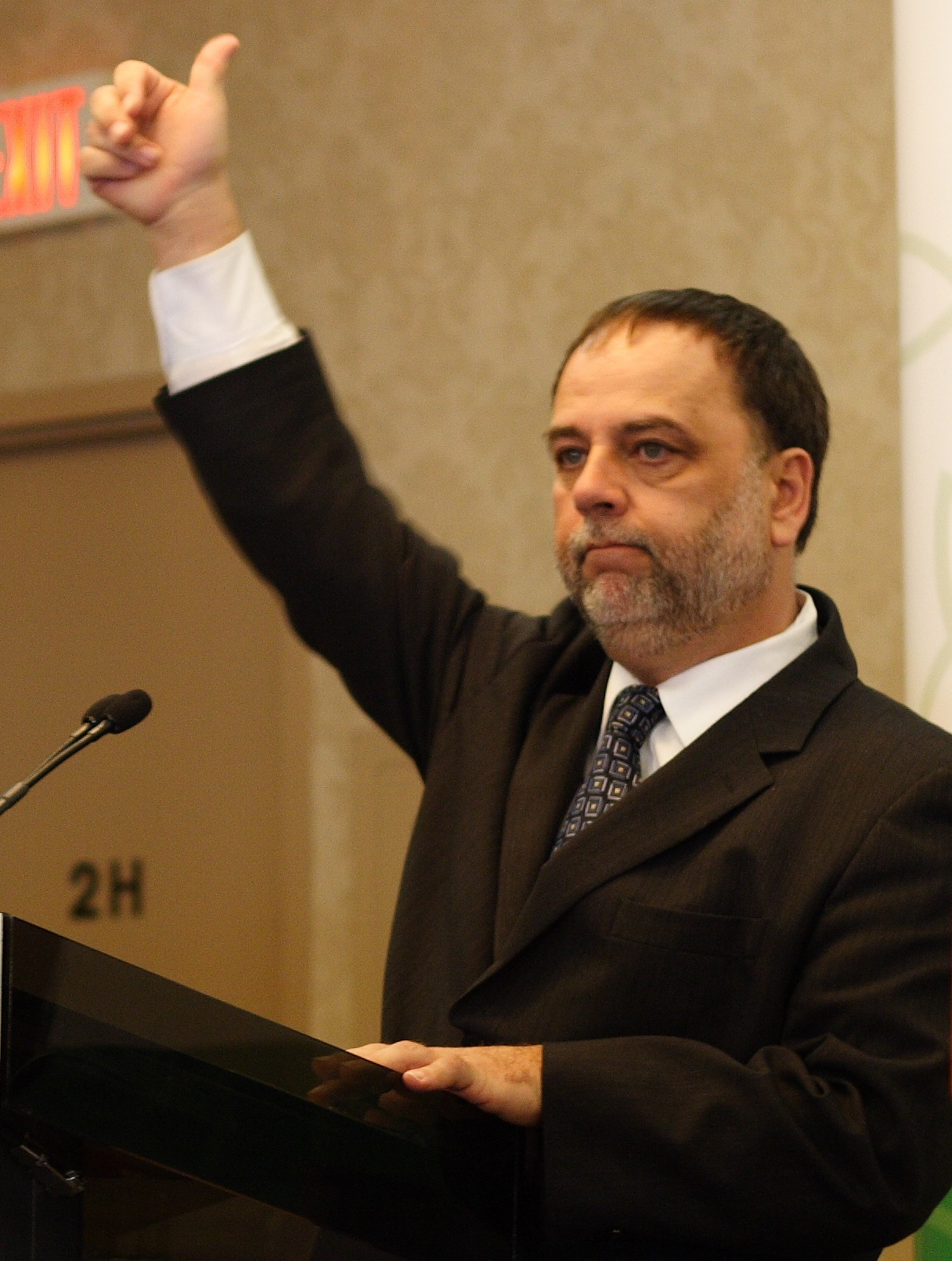

Member of the Ontario Provincial Parliament for Timmins
- In office June 7, 2018 – May 3, 2022
- Preceded by: Riding established
- Succeeded by: George Pirie

Member of the Ontario Provincial Parliament for Timmins—James Bay
- In office June 3, 1999 – May 9, 2018
- Preceded by: Riding established
- Succeeded by: Riding dissolved

Member of the Ontario Provincial Parliament for Cochrane South
- In office September 6, 1990 – June 3, 1999
- Preceded by: Alan Pope
- Succeeded by: Riding dissolved

Dean of the Legislative Assembly of Ontario
- In office June 7, 2018 – May 3, 2022 Serving with Ted Arnott and Jim Wilson
- Preceded by: Jim Bradley

Personal details
- Born: May 14, 1957 (age 69) Timmins, Ontario, Canada
- Party: New Democratic
- Spouse: Murielle
- Children: 2
- Occupation: Trade unionist

Gilles C. Bisson (born May 14, 1957) is a Franco-Ontarian politician in Ontario, Canada. He was a New Democratic member of the Legislative Assembly of Ontario from 1990 until his defeat in the 2022 Ontario general election. From 1999 to 2022 he represented the northern riding of Timmins.

== Background ==
Bisson is Franco-Ontarian. He was a labour union organizer, who worked for the Ontario Federation of Labour (of which he was the Northeast Director for a time).

A licensed private pilot, Bisson owns a small aircraft which he uses to fly between communities in his far-flung riding, the legislative seat in Toronto and elsewhere. Bisson was a member of the Royal Canadian Air Cadets with #10 Timmins Kiwanis Squadron where he attained the rank of Flight Sergeant. He also served in both the Canadian Armed Forces "reg force" in 1974/1975 and as a reservist with the Algonquin Regiment B Company.

Bisson is married, is a father of two daughters, and is a grandfather of four.

== Politics ==
Bisson was elected to the Ontario legislature in the provincial election of 1990, defeating Liberal Frank Krznaric by about 2,000 votes in the old riding of Cochrane South. He served as parliamentary assistant to the Ministers of Northern Development and Mines and Francophone Affairs in Bob Rae's government, and also served as a member of the cabinet committee on the North American Free Trade Agreement in 1993.

Although the NDP were defeated in the provincial election of 1995, Bisson significantly increased the margin of his victory in Cochrane South. He was, in fact, the only NDP candidate elected with more than 50% riding support in that cycle. He was easily re-elected in the 1999 election, and fought off a closer challenge from Liberal Michael Doody, a former mayor of Timmins and broadcaster, in the election of 2003. He was re-elected in 2007, 2011, and 2014.

Bisson's popularity has helped make Timmins—James Bay one of the top ridings in Ontario for the federal NDP as well, helping Charlie Angus pick up the seat in the 2004 election.

On August 29, 2008, Bisson announced he would run to succeed Howard Hampton in the 2009 Ontario New Democratic Party leadership election. Bisson was defeated, finishing in third place behind first runner-up Peter Tabuns and the victor, Andrea Horwath.

From 2014 until 2022 he was the party's House Leader and was the NDP's critic for Natural Resources and Forestry issues.

Bisson lost his seat to Progressive Conservative candidate George Pirie in the 2022 Ontario general election.

=== Electoral record ===
2022 Ontario general election: Timmins
Party	Candidate	Votes	%	±%	Expenditures
Progressive Conservative	George Pirie	9,356	64.81	+35.16	$28,384
New Democratic	Gilles Bisson	4,271	29.58	−27.85	$41,322
New Blue	David Farrell	421	2.92		$255
Green	Elizabeth Lockhard	323	2.24	+0.49	$0
Confederation of Regions	Nadia Sadiq	66	0.46		$0
Total valid votes/expense limit		14,437	99.33	+0.47	$46,740
Total rejected, unmarked, and declined ballots		98	0.67	-0.47	
Turnout		14,535	43.54	-4.58	
Eligible voters		33,345			
Progressive Conservative gain from New Democratic		Swing		+31.50	
Source(s): "Summary of Valid Votes Cast for Each Candidate" (PDF). Elections Ontario. 2022. Archived from the original on May 18, 2023.; "Statistical Summary by Electoral District" (PDF). Elections Ontario. 2022. Archived from the original on May 21, 2023.

2018 Ontario general election: Timmins
Party	Candidate	Votes	%	±%	Expenditures
New Democratic	Gilles Bisson	8,978	57.43	+11.45	$47,438
Progressive Conservative	Yvan L. Génier	4,634	29.64	–1.70	$13,052
Liberal	Mickey Auger	1,378	8.81	–11.68	$16,014
Green	Lucas Blake Schinbeckler	273	1.75	–0.22	none listed
Northern Ontario	Gary Schaap	249	1.59	N/A	$860
Libertarian	Jozef Bauer	121	0.77	N/A	none listed
Total valid votes		15,633	98.86		
Total rejected, unmarked and declined ballots		181	1.14		
Turnout		15,814	48.12		
Eligible voters		32,867			
New Democratic notional hold		Swing		+6.58	
Source: Elections Ontario

2014 Ontario general election
Party	Candidate	Votes	%	±%
New Democratic	Gilles Bisson	11,756	51.39	+1.92
Liberal	Sylvie Fontaine	5,527	24.32	+11.95
Progressive Conservative	Steve Black	5,226	22.72	-13.97
Green	Bozena Hrycyna	403	1.31	+0.31
Confederation of Regions	Fauzia Sadiq	60	0.27	
Total valid votes		22,972	100.00	
New Democratic hold		Swing		-5.02
Source: Elections Ontario

2011 Ontario general election
Party	Candidate	Votes	%	±%
New Democratic	Gilles Bisson	11,479	49.47	-2.70
Progressive Conservative	Al Spacek	8,515	36.69	+28.08
Liberal	Leonard Rickard	2,870	12.37	-25.15
Green	Angela Plant	233	1.00	-0.70
Freedom	Robert Neron	108	0.47	
Total valid votes		23,205	100.00	
Total rejected, unmarked and declined ballots		83	0.36	
Turnout		23,288	46.84	
Eligible voters		49,723		
New Democratic hold		Swing		-15.39
Source: Elections Ontario

2007 Ontario general election
Party	Candidate	Votes	%	±%
New Democratic	Gilles Bisson	13,176	52.17	+2.47
Liberal	Pat Boucher	9,729	37.52	-3.64
Progressive Conservative	Steve Kidd	2,191	8.61	+0.2
Green	Larry Verner	437	1.70	+0.97
Total valid votes		25,533	100.00	

2003 Ontario general election
Party	Candidate	Votes	%	±%
New Democratic	Gilles Bisson	14,941	49.70	-3.20
Liberal	Michael Doody	12,373	41.16	+8.34
Progressive Conservative	Merv Russell	2,527	8.41	-4.86
Green	Marsha Kriss	219	0.73	
Total valid votes		30,060	100.00	

1999 Ontario general election
Party	Candidate	Votes	%
New Democratic	Gilles Bisson	16,504	52.90
Liberal	Yves Malette	10,238	32.82
Progressive Conservative	Marcel Pelchat	4,139	13.27
Independent	Ed Walsh	316	1.01
Total valid votes		31,197	100.00

1995 Ontario general election
Party	Candidate	Votes	%	±%
New Democratic	Gilles Bisson	12,114	50.48	+1.27
Progressive Conservative	Gord Miller	6,587	27.45	+23.07
Liberal	Jim Brown	4,958	20.66	-19.54
Independent	Joel Vien	339	1.41	N/A
Total valid votes		23,098	100.00	
Total rejected, unmarked and declined ballots		192	0.83	
Turnout		23,290	60.36	
Eligible voters		38,584		
New Democratic hold		Swing		+1.27

1990 Ontario general election
Party	Candidate	Votes	%	±%
New Democratic	Gilles Bisson	11,460	49.21	
Liberal	Peter Krznaric	9,361	40.20	
Confederation of Regions	Ken Metsala	2,229	9.26	
Progressive Conservative	Tina Positano	1,019	4.38	
Total valid votes		24,069	100.00	
Total rejected, unmarked and declined ballots		153	0.63	
Turnout		24,222	62.95	
Eligible voters		38,479		
New Democratic gain		Swing		
