= Tom Laughren =

Canadian politician

Mayor of Timmins, Ontario
- In office 2006–2014
- Preceded by: Vic Power
- Succeeded by: Steve Black

Tom Laughren is a Canadian politician and former mayor of Timmins, Ontario. He took office on December 7, 2006, succeeding retiring longtime mayor Vic Power.

Laughren was acclaimed to the position after running unopposed in the November 2006 municipal election. Laughren first served as a city councillor for Timmins City Council from 1994 to 2003. He was reelected in the 2010 municipal election, winning nearly 90 per cent of the vote over challenger Allan Manchester.

Laughren is a lifelong resident of the Porcupine neighbourhood in Timmins. He and his wife, Maureen, have been married for 28 years and have three daughters.

He announced in 2014 that he would not run for reelection to a third term in the 2014 municipal election, and would instead be taking a private sector job with mining company Lake Shore Gold.
