= Kapuskasing—Timmins—Mushkegowuk =

Federal electoral district in Ontario, Canada

Coordinates: 51.781321°N 83.116701°W

Ontario electoral district
- Interactive map of riding boundaries from the 2025 federal election

Federal electoral district
- Legislature: House of Commons
MP
Gaétan Malette
Conservative
- District created: 1996
- First contested: 1997
- Last contested: 2021
- District webpage: profile, map

Demographics
- Population (2011): 83,104
- Electors (2015): 60,202
- Area (km²): 251,599
- Pop. density (per km²): 0.33
- Census division(s): Cochrane District, Timiskaming District
- Census subdivision(s): Timmins, Kapuskasing, Kirkland Lake, Cochrane, Hearst, Iroquois Falls, Black River-Matheson, Fort Albany, Chapleau, Attawapiskat

Kapuskasing—Timmins—Mushkegowuk (formerly Timmins—James Bay) is a federal electoral district in Ontario, Canada, that has been represented in the House of Commons of Canada since 1997. Its population in 2011 was 83,104. Under the 2022 Canadian federal electoral redistribution the riding was renamed.

The district includes the extreme eastern part of the District of Kenora, all of the District of Cochrane except for the central western part, and a small part south of Timmins, and all of the District of Timiskaming except for the extreme southeastern part.

Kapuskasing—Timmins—Mushkegowuk is the 11th largest riding in Canada and second largest in Ontario after Kenora.

== Geography ==
Kapuskasing—Timmins—Mushkegowuk consists of parts of the Territorial Districts of Kenora, Cochrane, and Timiskaming. In Kenora, it includes land east of a line running from the northeast corner of Thunder Bay (Albany River) north to Hudson Bay. In Cochrane, it excludes an area defined by a complex boundary involving numerous townships along various limits. In Timiskaming, the area is bounded by a line running from the northeast corner of the Township of Harris, west along the northern limits of several townships, and south along the western boundaries of other townships to the district’s southern limit.

== History ==
Originally Timmins—James Bay, it was created in 1996 from parts of Cochrane—Superior and Timiskaming—Cochrane ridings.

It consisted initially of:

- the part of the Territorial District of Cochrane lying west and north of a line drawn from the southeast corner of the City of Timmins north and west along the east and north limits of the city north along the east boundaries of the Townships of Prosser, Lucas, Beck and Ottaway, west and north along the south and west boundary of the Township of Clute, north along the east boundary of the Township of Colquhoun, and east along the south boundaries of the Townships of Marven, Thorning, Potter, Sangster, Bragg, Newman, Tomlinson, Hurtubise and St. Laurent,
- the part of the Territorial District of Kenora lying east of a line drawn north from the most northerly northeast corner of the Territorial District of Thunder Bay to Hudson Bay.

In 2003, it was given its current boundaries as described above.

This riding gained a fraction of territory from Nipissing—Timiskaming during the 2012 electoral redistribution.

=== 2022 changes ===
In the 2022 Canadian federal electoral redistribution the riding gains the Highway 11 corridor and the Chapleau area from Algoma—Manitoulin—Kapuskasing. Loses Marten Falls 65 and the area south of the Albany River and generally west of the Kenogami River to Thunder Bay—Superior North. Loses the southeastern quarter of Timiskaming District (James eastward and Chamberlain southward) to Nipissing—Timiskaming.

=== Members of Parliament ===
This riding has elected the following members of Parliament:

Parliament	Years	Member	Party
Timmins—James Bay; Riding created from Cochrane—Superior and Timiskaming—Cochrane
36th	1997–2000	Réginald Bélair	Liberal
37th	2000–2004	Réginald Bélair	Liberal
38th	2004–2006	Charlie Angus	New Democratic
39th	2006–2008	Charlie Angus	New Democratic
40th	2008–2011	Charlie Angus	New Democratic
41st	2011–2015	Charlie Angus	New Democratic
42nd	2015–2019	Charlie Angus	New Democratic
43rd	2019–2021	Charlie Angus	New Democratic
44th	2021–2025	Charlie Angus	New Democratic
Kapuskasing—Timmins—Mushkegowuk
45th	2025–present	Gaétan Malette	Conservative

== Demographics ==
According to the 2021 Canadian census

Ethnic groups: 74.7% White, 22.0% Indigenous, 1.3% South Asian

Languages: 63.1% English, 25.8% French, 1.7% Cree

Religions: 63.8% Christian (44.4% Catholic, 4.5% Anglican, 3.3% United Church, 1.5% Pentecostal, 1.2% Baptist, 1.0% Anabaptist, 7.9% Other), 33.6% None

Median income: $41,600 (2020)

Average income: $52,250 (2020)

== Election results ==
2025 Canadian federal election
Party	Candidate	Votes	%	±%	Expenditures
Conservative	Gaétan Malette	23,062	48.9	+23.77	
Liberal	Steve Black	18,366	39.0	+12.75	
New Democratic	Nicole Fortier Levesque	4,895	10.4	–25.50	
People's	Serge Lefebvre	814	1.7	–10.48	
Total valid votes/expense limit		47,137	99.1	+0.1	
Total rejected ballots		408	0.9	-0.1	
Turnout		47,545	63.0	+7.6	
Eligible voters		75,494			
Conservative gain from New Democratic		Swing		+5.51	
Source: Elections Canada

2021 federal election redistributed results
Party	Vote	%
New Democratic	14,582	35.79
Liberal	10,682	26.22
Conservative	10,257	25.18
People's	4,999	12.27
Green	162	0.40
Others	58	0.14

2021 Canadian federal election: Timmins—James Bay
Party	Candidate	Votes	%	±%	Expenditures
New Democratic	Charlie Angus	12,132	35.1	-5.4	$88,140.09
Conservative	Morgan Ellerton	9,393	27.2	+0.2	$19,999.91
Liberal	Steve Black	8,508	24.6	-1.1	$44,629.30
People's	Stephen MacLeod	4,537	13.1	+9.7	$12,559.12
Total valid votes		34,570			
Total rejected ballots		355	1.02	+0.02	
Turnout		34,925	55.4	-3.2	
Eligible voters		63,041			
New Democratic hold		Swing		-2.8	
Source: Elections Canada

2019 Canadian federal election: Timmins—James Bay
Party	Candidate	Votes	%	±%	Expenditures
New Democratic	Charlie Angus	14,885	40.5	-2.35	$85,828.95
Conservative	Kraymr Grenke	9,907	27.0	+6.60	$38,287.03
Liberal	Michelle Boileau	9,443	25.7	-9.02	$46,774.56
Green	Max Kennedy	1,257	3.4	+1.38	$1,722.98
People's	Renaud Roy	1,248	3.4	–	$9,105.18
Total valid votes/expense limit		36,740	100.0		
Total rejected ballots		369			
Turnout		37,109	58.6		
Eligible voters		63,282			
New Democratic hold		Swing		-4.47	
Source: Elections Canada

2015 Canadian federal election: Timmins—James Bay
Party	Candidate	Votes	%	±%	Expenditures
New Democratic	Charlie Angus	15,974	42.85	-7.1	$73,519.39
Liberal	Todd Lever	12,940	34.72	+18.74	$35,151.97
Conservative	John P. Curley	7,605	20.40	-11.48	$37,300.73
Green	Max Kennedy	752	2.02	-0.18	$520.54
Total valid votes/Expense limit		37,271	100.0		$245,251.56
Total rejected ballots		266	–	–	
Turnout		37,537	61.84	+10.84	
Eligible voters		60,692			
New Democratic hold		Swing		-12.89	
Source: Elections Canada

2011 federal election redistributed results
Party	Vote	%
New Democratic	16,833	49.95
Conservative	10,743	31.88
Liberal	5,387	15.98
Green	740	2.20

2011 Canadian federal election: Timmins—James Bay
Party	Candidate	Votes	%	±%	Expenditures
New Democratic	Charlie Angus	16,738	50.4	-6.1	–
Conservative	Bill Greenberg	10,526	31.7	+13.5	–
Liberal	Marilyn Wood	5,230	15.7	-6.5	–
Green	Lisa Bennett	724	2.2	-0.9	–
Total valid votes/Expense limit		33,218	100.0		
Total rejected ballots		184	0.6	+0.1	
Turnout		33,402	56.5	+5.5	
Eligible voters		59,136			

2008 Canadian federal election: Timmins—James Bay
Party	Candidate	Votes	%	±%	Expenditures
New Democratic	Charlie Angus	17,188	56.5	+6.0	$63,948
Liberal	Paul Taillefer	6,740	22.2	-12.1	$ 31,909
Conservative	Bill Greenberg	5,536	18.2	+4.6	$29,651
Green	Larry Verner	938	3.1	+1.5	$133
Total valid votes/Expense limit		30,402	100.0	$97,746	
Total rejected ballots		133	0.4		
Turnout		30,535	51.0		

2006 Canadian federal election: Timmins—James Bay
Party	Candidate	Votes	%	±%
New Democratic	Charlie Angus	19,150	50.5	+9.1
Liberal	Robert Riopelle	13,028	34.3	-5.3
Conservative	Ken Graham	5,164	13.6	-3.1
Green	Sahaja Freed	610	1.6	-0.7
valid votes		37,952	100.0	
New Democratic hold		Swing		+7.2

2004 Canadian federal election
Party	Candidate	Votes	%	±%
New Democratic	Charlie Angus	14,138	41.4	+19.7
Liberal	Ray Chénier	13,525	39.6	-14.9
Conservative	Andrew Van Oosten	5,682	16.7	-6.2
Green	Marsha Gail Kriss	767	2.3	
Total valid votes			34,112	100.0

Note: Change from 2000 is based on redistributed results. Conservative Party change is based on the combination of Canadian Alliance and Progressive Conservative Party totals.

2000 Canadian federal election
Party	Candidate	Votes	%	±%
Liberal	Réginald Bélair	16,335	54.2	+4.0
New Democratic	Len Wood	9,385	31.1	-4.5
Alliance	James Gibb	3,356	11.1	+3.8
Progressive Conservative	Daniel Clark	1,053	3.5	-3.2
Total valid votes		30,129	100.0	

Note: Canadian Alliance vote is compared to the Reform vote in 1997 election.

1997 Canadian federal election
Party	Candidate	Votes	%
Liberal	Réginald Bélair	16,829	50.3
New Democratic	Cid Samson	11,945	35.7
Reform	Donna Ferolie	2,464	7.4
Progressive Conservative	Jodi MacDonald	2,251	6.7
Total valid votes		33,489	100.0

== See also ==
- List of Canadian electoral districts
- Historical federal electoral districts of Canada
