= List of the youngest mayors in Canada =

This is a list of the youngest mayors in Canada. This list is inclusive of individuals nearest to the age of majority at the time of their election; usually under the age of 35. The people listed here are notable because of the rarity of their age category holding elected office of any type, particularly mayorships.

Name	Municipality	Year Elected	Age	Years	Notes
Aidan Kallioinen	Espanola, Ontario	2026	22	2026-present	Kallioinen was first elected to council at the age of 18.
David Scott	Seaforth, Ontario	1997	32	1998-2000	Won first election, beating incumbent Irwin Johnson. No previous political history.
Nicolas Malette	Cayamant, Quebec	November 5, 2017	22	2017–present	Malette was first elected to council at the age of 18 and is the youngest mayor in Quebec history at 22 years of age when elected.
Christopher Ewen	R.M. of Ritchot, Manitoba	2017	29	2017–present	Won first term in by-election, beating incumbent Jackie Hunt. No previous political history.
Sean Harvey	Vernon, British Columbia	1969	29	1999–2005	At 29, he was Vernon's youngest mayor when he was first elected in 1999. In 2005, he resigned as mayor after questionable expense claims came to light.
Sean McIntyre	Sylvan Lake, Alberta	September 30, 1983	30	2013–present	He was first elected to council in 2010 at the age of 27, and unseated a two-term incumbent to be elected mayor in 2013 at the age of 30 with 71% of the popular vote.
Lisa Holmes	Morinville, Alberta	February 22, 1980	33	2013–present	She was first elected to Municipal Council in 2010 and was serving as deputy mayor in 2013 when the current mayor, Paul Krauskopf, died from cancer. She was declared the winner after a recount was held. She is currently believed to be the youngest female mayor in Canada.
Robert Vagramov	Port Moody, British Columbia	October 20, 2018	26	2018–present	First elected as city councillor at the age of 22.
Steve Black	Timmins, Ontario	April 20, 1982	32	2014–2018	First elected as member of the City of Timmins Council in 2010.
Sébastien Després	Witless Bay, Newfoundland and Labrador	January 28, 1980	33	2013–present	He had never served on a municipal council before being elected as Mayor of Witless Bay.
Luke Strimbold	Burns Lake, British Columbia	30 May 1991	21	2011–2016	First elected as a member of the Burns Lake Town Council in 2010. Resigned in 2016.
Don Iveson	Edmonton, Alberta	30 May 1979	34	2013–2021	First elected as member of the Edmonton City Council in 2007.
Herbert Charles Wilson	Edmonton, Alberta	7 December 1859	35	1895-1896 (resigned)	
Claudette Millar	Cambridge, Ontario		35		One of the few female mayors in Canada when elected.
Steve Peters	St. Thomas, Ontario	19 January 1963	28	1991-2000	First elected as a city councillor at age of 25, Peters later represented the area in Provincial Parliament and served as the Speaker of the Legislative Assembly of Ontario from 2007 to 2011.
William Antrobus Griesbach	Edmonton, Alberta	January 3, 1878 – January 21, 1945	28	1906-1907 (resigned)	Griesbach was referred to as "Edmonton's boy mayor."
Frank N. Darke	Regina, Saskatchewan	1863 – 1940	35	1898-1899	
André Bachand	Asbestos, Quebec	8 December 1961	25	1986-1997	Was the youngest mayor in Quebec history when elected.
Priscilla Mooney	Branch, Newfoundland and Labrador	1976	30	2006–present	
Eddie Francis	Windsor, Ontario	1974	29	2003–2014	
Steve Kent	Mount Pearl, Newfoundland and Labrador	May 7, 1978	25	2003-2007	Elected to Newfoundland and Labrador House of Assembly in 2007 at age 29.
Christine (Nussey) Lalonde	Rose Blanche-Harbour le Cou, Newfoundland and Labrador	August 2009	25	2009–2011	Perhaps the youngest female mayor in Canadian history
Natasha Salonen	Township of Wilmot, Ontario	October 2022	27	2022 - present	Youngest female mayor in Ontario history. Both the youngest and first female mayor elected in Wilmot Township.
Eric Duncan	Winchester, Ontario	November 10, 1987	22	2011–present	Duncan was first elected at the age of 19 as councillor, then defeated the two-term incumbent mayor in a landslide with 72% of the vote.
Steve Clark	Brockville, Ontario	-	22	1982-1991	
Jerrod Schafer	Swift Current, Saskatchewan	-	32	2010–present	Was first elected to council at 26 years of age.
Thomas Sierzycki	La Ronge, Saskatchewan	April 10, 1988	21	2009–present	Was first elected to council at 18 years of age in 2006.
Clayton Smith	New Norway, Alberta	-	19	1995-1998	First served on village council at the age of 18 in August 1994 after being acclaimed in a by-election. Ran successfully in the general election of October 1995 and was appointed mayor later that month by his fellow councillors.
Gerry Taft	Invermere, British Columbia	June 15, 1982	26	2008–present	First elected to Invermere council at the age of 20 in 2002. After serving two three year terms, ran and won as mayor in 2008.
Ryan Windsor	Central Saanich, British Columbia	December 27, 1979	34	2014–present	First elected to council in a by-election in 2013. Elected Mayor of the Vancouver Island municipality in November 2014.
Thomas Trout	Delia, Alberta	2025	24	2025–present	Trout was elected mayor of the Village of Delia in 2025 at the age of 24.
Bill Given	Grande Prairie, Alberta	March 13, 1977	33	2010–present	First elected to council in 2001 at age 24 as the youngest council member in Grande Prairie's history. Elected in October 2010 as the city's youngest mayor.
Kurtis Smith	Adelaide Metcalfe, Ontario	October 2014	25	2014–Present	First elected as councillor in 2010 as the youngest councillor in Adelaide Metcalfe at age 21. Then in 2014 was elected as mayor defeating the incumbent at the age of 25 as the youngest mayor and county councillor in Middlesex County.
Sharie Minions	Port Alberni, British Columbia	October 2018	30	2018-Present	Youngest mayor ever elected to Vancouver Island
Mark Sager	West Vancouver, British Columbia	November 1990	32	1990-1996	First elected to council in 1986 at age 29 as the youngest council member in West Vancouver. After serving two terms, he ran and won for mayor in November 1990 making him the municipality's youngest mayor at age 32.

== See also ==
- Youth politics
- Youth rights
- Youth voting
- Paradise, NL mayoral election controversy
