= William Mattice =

Province of Canada politician

William Mattice (November 15, 1798 – July 27, 1881) was a merchant and political figure in Canada West.

He was born in Cornwall Township in Upper Canada in 1798, the son of United Empire Loyalists. He started work in Toronto but returned to Cornwall. Mattice was a merchant and also acted as agent for the Bank of Montreal at Cornwall. He served as mayor in 1849 and 1860 and was also a colonel in the local militia. He represented Stormont in the Legislative Assembly of the Province of Canada from 1851 to 1857.

His son, William D. Mattice, also represented Stormont in the Legislative Assembly.

His grandson, Gregor Lenox Mattice was honored in the naming of Mattice-Val Côté, Ontario.
