= William D. Mattice =

William D. Mattice (1829 – June 18, 1861) was a political figure in Canada West. He represented Stormont in the Legislative Assembly of the Province of Canada from 1858 to 1861 as a Reformer.

He was the son of William Mattice, who also represented Stormont in the assembly. Mattice graduated from Queen's University in 1847. He served as treasurer for Cornwall Township. Mattice died in office at the age of 32.

His nephew, Gregor Lenox Mattice, was honored in the naming of Mattice-Val Côté, Ontario.
