= Reesor Siding strike of 1963 =

Canadian labour conflict

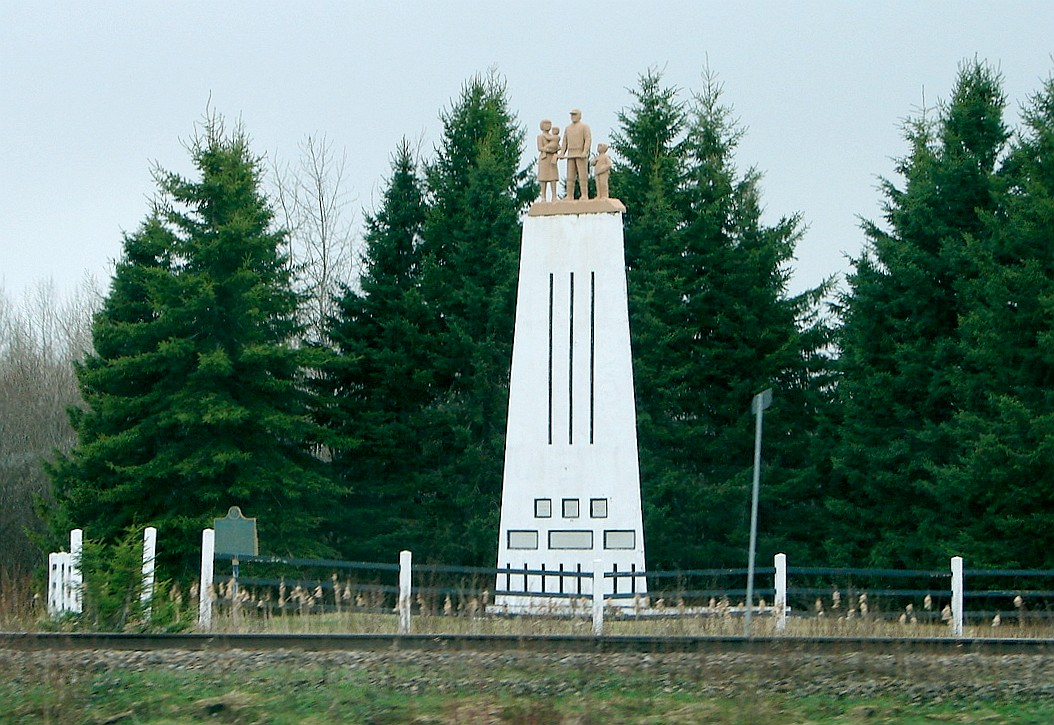
Monument to the incident

Detail of the monument

The Reesor Siding strike of 1963 was one of the defining labour conflicts in Canadian history, resulting in the shooting of 11 union members, three of whom were killed. The violent confrontation occurred near the small Francophone hamlet of Reesor Siding (a ghost town today), which is located just west of Opasatika, approximately halfway between Kapuskasing and Hearst in Northern Ontario.

== Background ==
Fifteen hundred members of the Lumber and Sawmill Workers Union, Local 2995 of the United Brotherhood of Carpenters and Joiners of America, walked out on strike on January 14, 1963, effectively halting operations at the Spruce Falls Power and Paper Company which relied on their logs for wood pulp. Among the complaints of the woodcutters were a proposed wage freeze and a proposal by the company that would have seen the woodcutters working seven days a week over the next two months to meet quota.

Independent local farmer-settlers were also established suppliers of pulp wood to the mill, supplying approximately 25% of the company's annual needs. When they were asked to halt their own sales to put further pressure on the mill, however, the farmers refused. Combined with a separate strike at The New York Times, one of the chief consumers of the mill's pulp, this weakened the bargaining position of the woodcutters. Union members began sabotaging the farmers' stacked piles of lumber, making it unsaleable. The farmers' refusal to support the strike, and the tactics of the strikers soured relationships with the community.

The situation deteriorated to the point that on January 23, the mayor of Kapuskasing, Norman Grant, was quoted in The Globe and Mail: "These settlers are getting so desperate they are going to go into the bush with guns and shoot anyone who tries to interfere with their cutting."

== Confrontation ==
On February 10, a shipment of 600 cords (2200 m³) was scheduled to be loaded onto waiting railcars at midnight, and a mob of 400 unarmed union members had resolved to disrupt the shipment. Between 12 and 20 Ontario Provincial Police (OPP) officers waited at the loading station where twenty farmers were on hand to protect the lumber.

The police erected a simple line made from chains in an attempt to protect the shipment and keep the two groups apart. However, the union members breached the small police cordon. As the union members continued toward the stockpiled pulp wood, a number of the farmers stepped out from the concealment of a hut by the tracks and began shooting before the union members reached the chain. Eleven union members were shot: Fernand Drouin, and brothers Irenée and Joseph Fortier were killed; eight others were wounded: Harry Bernard, Ovila Bernard, Joseph Boily, Alex Hachey, Albert Martel, Joseph Mercier, Léo Ouimette and Daniel Tremblay.

Later, Donald MacDonald, leader of the Ontario New Democratic Party (NDP), would declare that affidavits indicated the police knew that the farmers had brought firearms with them that night, but had not taken any precautions to ensure that they were not used.

== Resolution ==
Following the deadly confrontation, an additional 200 OPP officers were sent to the scene. The Provincial Ministry of Labour quickly intervened to settle the labour dispute. The striking workers voted to return to work under the terms of their old contract on February 17 while arbitration to fully resolve the issues behind the 33-day-long strike continued.

== Legal proceedings ==
All twenty farmers present the night of the shootings were charged, and 5 .22 rifles, 3 12 gauge shotguns, 2 .30-30 rifles, 2 Lee–Enfield rifles, a .30-06 rifle and a .38 Smith & Wesson revolver were confiscated.

A total of 237 union members were charged with rioting and held temporarily in the former Monteith POW camp, south of Iroquois Falls, until they were released on bail posted by the union. Eventually, 138 union members were found guilty of illegal assembly and the union paid CA$27,600 (equivalent to $269,000 in 2023) in fines.

The case against the farmers was heard in October 1963 in Cochrane, before Supreme Court of Ontario Chief Justice McRuer. After three days of deliberations following a preliminary hearing the seven-man jury dismissed the charges of non-capital murder. Paul-Emile Coulombe, Léonce Tremblay, and Héribert Murray were charged with firearms violations arising from the incident, which resulted in fines of CA$150 (equivalent to $1,460 in 2023) to each of them.

== Cultural significance ==
A memorial to the incident and the dead and injured workers was erected by the union, amid some public outcry, at a cost of CA$22,000 (equivalent to $215,000 in 2023). The Globe and Mail reported threats at the time to destroy the monument. The Province of Ontario in turn erected a historical plaque on the site, which is located at 49.5725°N 83.078333°W.

In 1969, Stompin Tom Connors released his album On Tragedy Trail, which chronicled various real and fictitious Canadian tragedies, including the Reesor shooting. He reported receiving death threats, ordering him not to play the song at upcoming venues.

The incident has been the subject of a number of folks songs, plays, and a CBC radio documentary in Quebec. It also forms the basis for the 2003 historical novel Défenses legitimes by Doric Germain.

In 2005, Brent St. Denis marked the 42nd anniversary of the confrontation in Parliament, and it has also been occasionally raised in the course of the business of the Ontario Legislature as an important milestone in labour history.

== See also ==
- Winnipeg General Strike of 1919
- Rosvall and Voutilainen
