= Ontario Mining Cup =

- Sport: Ice hockey
- Founded: 2014
- No. of teams: 16
- Country: Canada
- Most recent champion: Nalco
- Official website: ontariominingcup.com

The Ontario Mining Cup is an annual mining industry ice hockey tournament held in Timmins, Ontario at the McIntyre Arena. The event is currently hosted by the Porcupine branch of the Canadian Institute of Mining, Metallurgy and Petroleum (CIM). The event was founded as an education fundraiser by mining engineer and mayor of Timmins Steve Black, in 2014. Proceeds from the tournament go towards scholarships, bursaries and awards for mining students at the Haileybury Campus of Northern College.

== Format ==
The tournament is a round robin competition followed by a single elimination playoff that has determined the mining industry champion since the inaugural 2014 Ontario Mining Cup Hockey Tournament. The tournament features 16 teams representing mining sector organizations.

== Champions ==
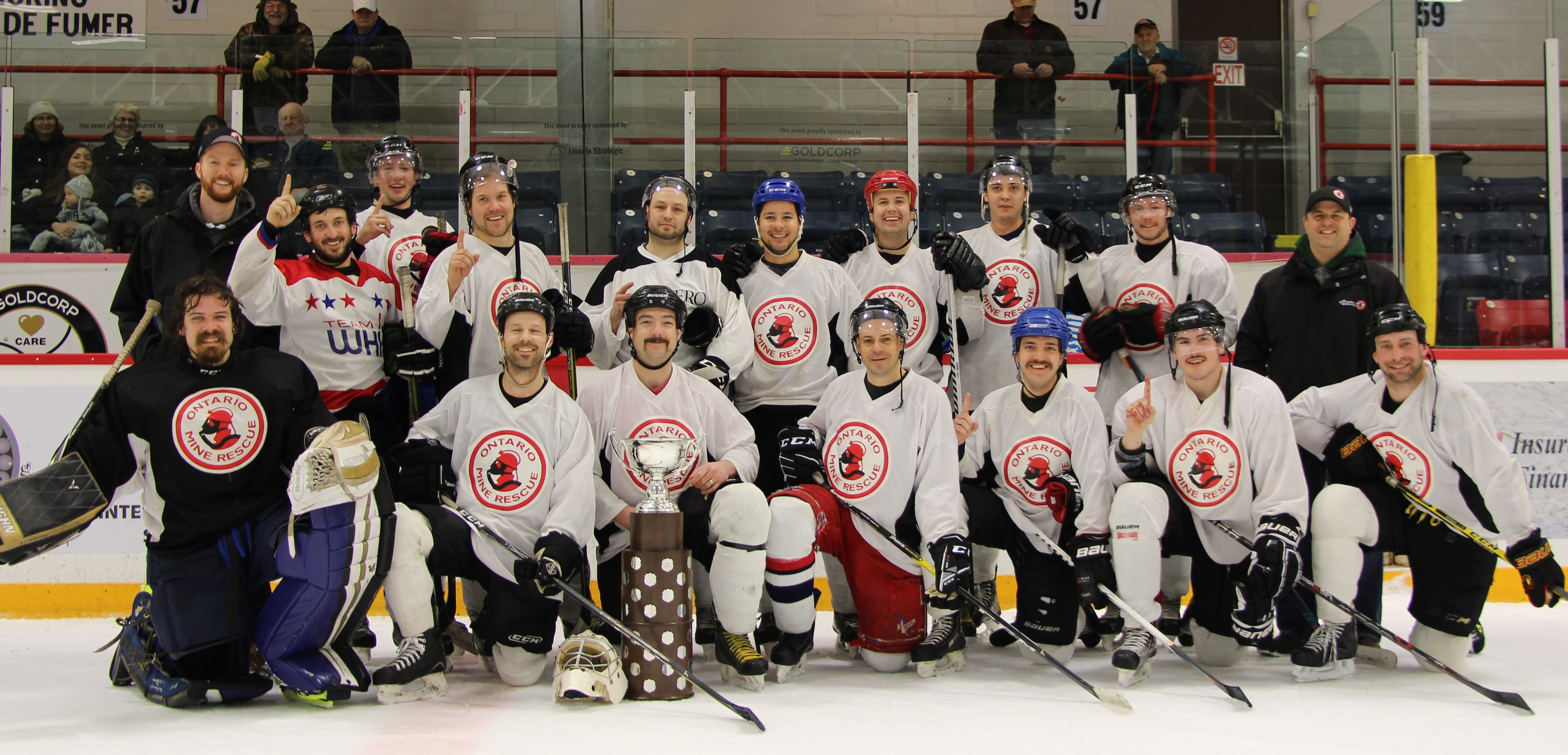
2019 Ontario Mining Cup Champions: Ontario Mine Rescue

=== A division ===
Year	Champions	Finalists	Score
2014	Taurus Drilling	Kidd Operations A	4-3
2015	Nalco	Taurus Drilling	5-1
2016	Nalco	Ontario Mine Rescue	4-3
2017	Nalco	Ontario Mine Rescue	2-1
2018	Nalco	Ontario Mine Rescue	3-2
2019	Ontario Mine Rescue	Nalco	2-0
2020	Not Contested - COVID-19	-	-
2021	Not Contested - COVID-19	-	-
2022	Not Contested - COVID-19	-	-
2023	-	-	-

=== B division ===
Year	Champions	Finalists	Score
2014	Goldcorp Porcupine Gold Mines	Ontario Mine Rescue	7-4
2015	Kidd Operations B	Lincoln Strategic	—
2016	—	—	—
2017	Kidd Operations A	The Miner's Son Restaurant	3-1
2018	—	—	—
2019	TBD	TBD	-
2020	Not Contested - COVID-19	-	-
2021	Not Contested - COVID-19	-	-
2022	Not Contested - COVID-19	-	-
2023	-	-	-

== See also ==
- Canadian Institute of Mining, Metallurgy and Petroleum
