= Steve Black (politician) =

Canadian politician

24th Mayor of Timmins, Ontario
- In office December 1, 2014 – November 30, 2018
- Preceded by: Tom Laughren
- Succeeded by: George Pirie

Timmins City Councillor for Ward 5
- Incumbent
- Assumed office December 2, 2022

Personal details
- Born: Steven L. Black; April 20, 1982 (age 44) Oshawa, Ontario
- Party: Liberal (federal)
- Education: Queen's University (B.Eng.)
- Occupation: Mining engineer

Steven L. Black (born April 20, 1982) is a Canadian politician, who served as mayor of Timmins, Ontario from 2014 to 2018. He was elected in the municipal election on October 27, 2014, defeating former councillor Todd Lever by taking 65% of the vote, and becoming Timmins' youngest mayor ever elected. He succeeded retiring mayor Tom Laughren.

Originally from Oshawa, Ontario, he studied mining engineering at Queen's University, and moved to Timmins in 2004 to complete a co-operative education term with the city's Kidd Creek Mine. He coached minor hockey for six seasons, and has been involved with the Timmins and Schumacher minor hockey associations.

Prior to his election to the mayoralty, Black served as a city councillor on the Timmins City Council from 2010 to 2014. At the time of his election, he was the second-youngest councillor elected in history. Alan Pope was a few months younger when elected as an alderman in 1973. He ran as a Progressive Conservative Party of Ontario candidate in Timmins—James Bay in the 2014 provincial election, but lost to incumbent MPP Gilles Bisson.

Black was defeated by George Pirie in the 2018 municipal election.

He ran as a Liberal Party of Canada candidate for Timmins-James Bay in the 2021 Canadian federal election, but was not victorious.

He was reelected to a council seat in the 2022 Cochrane District municipal elections.

Black will contest Kapuskasing—Timmins—Mushkegowuk in the 2025 Canadian federal election for the Liberals.

== Electoral record ==
=== Federal ===
2025 Canadian federal election: Kapuskasing—Timmins—Mushkegowuk
Party	Candidate	Votes	%	±%	Expenditures
Conservative	Gaétan Malette	23,062	48.93	+23.75	$137,820.08
Liberal	Steve Black	18,366	38.96	+12.74	$109,119.80
New Democratic	Nicole Fortier Levesque	4,895	10.38	–25.41	$113,247.93
People's	Serge Lefebvre	814	1.73	–10.54	$1,483.27
Total valid votes/expense limit		47,137	99.14	+0.14	$157,222.88
Total rejected ballots		408	0.86	–0.14	
Turnout		47,545	62.98	+7.58	
Eligible voters		75,494			
Conservative notional gain from New Democratic		Swing		+5.51	
Source: Elections Canada

2021 Canadian federal election: Timmins—James Bay
Party	Candidate	Votes	%	±%	Expenditures
New Democratic	Charlie Angus	12,132	35.1	-5.4	$88,140.09
Conservative	Morgan Ellerton	9,393	27.2	+0.2	$19,999.91
Liberal	Steve Black	8,508	24.6	-1.1	$44,629.30
People's	Stephen MacLeod	4,537	13.1	+9.7	$12,559.12
Total valid votes		34,570			
Total rejected ballots		355	1.02	+0.02	
Turnout		34,925	55.4	-3.2	
Eligible voters		63,041			
New Democratic hold		Swing		-2.8	
Source: Elections Canada

=== Provincial ===
2014 Ontario general election
Party	Candidate	Votes	%	±%
New Democratic	Gilles Bisson	11,818	51.39	+1.92
Liberal	Sylvie Fontaine	5,592	24.32	+11.95
Progressive Conservative	Steve Black	5,226	22.72	-13.97
Green	Bozena Hrycyna	301	1.31	+0.31
Confederation of Regions	Fauzia Sadiq	61	0.27	
Total valid votes		22,998	100.00	
New Democratic hold		Swing		-5.02
Source: Elections Ontario

=== Municipal ===
Timmins Mayoral Election, 2014	Vote	%
Steve Black	8,802	64.58
Todd Lever	4,510	33.09
Allan R. Manchester	318	2.33

Mayoral Candidate	Vote	%
Tom Laughren (X)	10,530	89.62
Alan Manchester	1,220	10.38
Ward 1 Candidate	Vote	%
Gary Skripnick (X)	838	39.47
Veronica Farrell	756	35.61
Frank Pontarelli	529	24.92
Ward 2 Candidate	Vote	%
John Curley (X)	587	55.69
Mickey Auger	467	44.31
Ward 3 Candidate	Vote	%
Noella Rinaldo	469	63.98
Lou Battochio	165	22.51
Chad Portelance	52	7.09
Remi Villars	47	6.41
Ward 4 Candidate	Vote	%
Pat Bamford (X)	736	54.56
Norm Bolduc	613	45.44
Ward 5 Candidate	Vote	%
Todd Lever	3,864	19.07
Michael Doody (x)	3,601	17.77
Andrew Marks	2,894	14.28
Steven Black	2,758	13.61
Stephen Adams (x)	2,647	13.06
Jack Slattery (x)	2,294	11.32
Billy Gvozdanovic (x)	2,205	10.88

== Ontario Mining Cup ==
In addition to being a volunteer minor hockey coach for the Schumacher Day Minor Hockey Association, Black was also the founder of the Ontario Mining Cup hockey tournament. The tournament seeks to bring together mining sector hockey teams from around the province to compete for industry bragging rights while raising money for post-secondary scholarships in mining.

== See also ==
- List of the youngest mayors in Canada
