= Timmins—James Bay (provincial electoral district) =

Coordinates: 52°N 83°W

Ontario electoral district
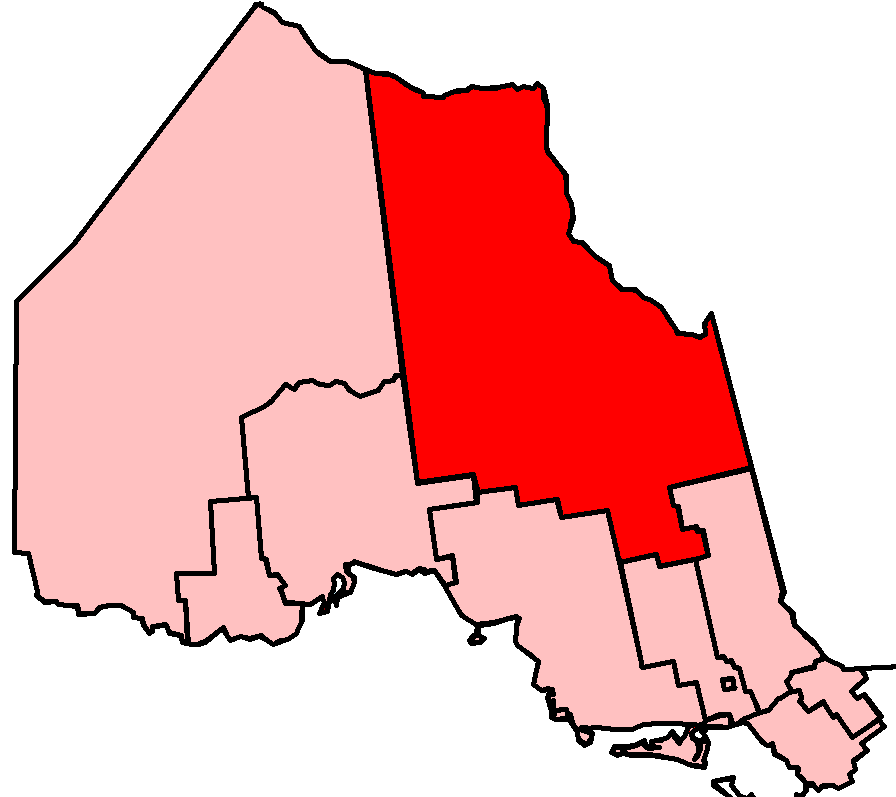
- Timmins—James Bay in relation to other electoral districts in Northern Ontario

Defunct provincial electoral district
- Legislature: Legislative Assembly of Ontario
- District created: 1999
- District abolished: 2018
- First contested: 1999
- Last contested: 2014

Demographics
- Population (2001): 71,648
- Electors (2007): 48,516
- Area (km²): 250,557
- Census division(s): District of Cochrane, District of Timiskaming, District of Kenora

Timmins—James Bay was a provincial electoral district in Ontario, Canada, that was represented in the Legislative Assembly of Ontario from 1999 to 2018. Its population in 2001 was 84,001.

The district included the extreme eastern part of the District of Kenora, all of the District of Cochrane except for the central western part, and a small part south of Timmins, and all of the District of Timiskaming except for the extreme southeastern part.

== Geography ==
Timmins—James Bay consisted of

- the part of the Territorial District of Kenora lying east of a line drawn from the northeast corner of the most northerly point of the Territorial District of Thunder Bay (Albany River) due north to Hudson Bay;
- the Territorial District of Cochrane, excluding the part bounded by a line drawn from the western limit of the territorial district east along the northern limits of the townships of Boyce, Boyce, Shuel, Mulloy, Fintry, Auden, Rogers, Fushimi, Bannerman, Ritchie, Mulvey, Goldwin, Sweet, Hillmer, McKnight, Boyle, Mowbray, Howells, Sheldon, Pinard and Mewhinney, south along the eastern boundaries of the townships of Mewhinney, Bourassa, Tolmie, Menapia, Beniah, Colquhoun and Calder, west along the northern boundary of the Township of Ottaway, south along the western boundaries of the townships of Ottaway, Beck, Lucas and Prosser, and west along the southern boundaries of the townships of Carnegie, Reid, Thorburn, Moberly, Aitken, Poulett, Watson and Lisgar, to the southwestern limit of the territorial district;
- the part of the Territorial District of Timiskaming bounded by a line drawn from the northeast corner of the Township of Harris, west along the northern boundaries of the townships of Harris, Dymond, Hudson, Lundy, Auld and Speight, and south along the western boundaries of the townships of Speight, Van Nostrand and Leo to the southern limit of the territorial district.

== History ==
Timmins—James Bay was created in 1999 from all of Cochrane North and part of Cochrane South. At that time, Ontario was divided into the same electoral districts as those used for federal electoral purposes.

It consisted initially of:

- the part of the Territorial District of Cochrane lying west and north of a line drawn from the southeast corner of the City of Timmins north and west along the east and north limits of the city north along the east boundaries of the Townships of Prosser, Lucas, Beck and Ottaway, west and north al;ong the south and west boundary of the Township of Clute, north along the east boundary of the Township of Colquhoun, and east along the south boundaries of the Townships of Marven, Thorning, Potter, Sangster, Bragg, Newman, Tomlinson, Hurtubise and St. Laurent,
- the part of the Territorial District of Kenora lying east of a line drawn north from the most northerly northeast corner of the Territorial District of Thunder Bay to Hudson Bay.

In 2005, legislation was passed by the Legislature to divide Ontario into 107 electoral districts, beginning with the next provincial election in 2007. The eleven northern electoral districts are those defined for federal purposes in 1996, based on the 1991 census (except for a minor boundary adjustment). The 96 southern electoral districts are those defined for federal electoral purposes in 2003, based on the 2001 census. Without this legislation, the number of electoral districts in northern Ontario would have been reduced from eleven to ten.

Prior to the 2018 provincial election, the Ontario government's Far North Electoral Boundaries Commission proposed dividing Timmins—James Bay into one riding for the city of Timmins, to be named Timmins, and another riding for the remainder of the current district, to be named Mushkegowuk—James Bay. The creation of Mushkegowuk—James Bay, Timmins, and Kiiwetinoong (another new northern riding) were approved with the passage of the Representation Statute Law Amendment Act, 2017 in the Legislative Assembly of Ontario.

== Members ==
Timmins—James Bay
Assembly	Years	Member	Party
Riding created from Cochrane North and Cochrane South
37th	1999–2003	Gilles Bisson	New Democratic
38th	2003–2007	Gilles Bisson	New Democratic
39th	2007–2011	Gilles Bisson	New Democratic
40th	2011–2014	Gilles Bisson	New Democratic
41st	2014–2018	Gilles Bisson	New Democratic
Riding dissolved into Timmins and Mushkegowuk—James Bay

== Election results ==
2014 Ontario general election
Party	Candidate	Votes	%	±%
New Democratic	Gilles Bisson	11,756	51.18	+1.71
Liberal	Sylvie Fontaine	5,527	24.06	+11.69
Progressive Conservative	Steve Black	5,226	22.75	–13.95
Green	Bozena Hrycyna	403	1.75	+0.75
Confederation of Regions	Fauzia Sadiq	60	0.26	–
Total valid votes		22,972	98.98	
Total rejected, unmarked and declined ballots		236	1.02	+0.66
Turnout		23,208	45.15	–1.68
Eligible voters		51,398		
New Democratic hold		Swing		–4.99
Source: Elections Ontario

2011 Ontario general election
Party	Candidate	Votes	%	±%
New Democratic	Gilles Bisson	11,479	49.47	–2.14
Progressive Conservative	Al Spacek	8,515	36.69	+28.11
Liberal	Leonard Rickard	2,870	12.37	–25.74
Green	Angela Plant	233	1.00	–0.71
Freedom	Robert Neron	108	0.47	–
Total valid votes		23,205	99.64	
Total rejected, unmarked and declined ballots		83	0.36	–0.46
Turnout		23,288	46.84	–6.92
Eligible voters		49,723		
New Democratic hold		Swing		–15.12
Source: Elections Ontario

2007 Ontario general election
Party	Candidate	Votes	%	±%
New Democratic	Gilles Bisson	13,176	51.60	+1.90
Liberal	Pat Boucher	9,729	38.10	–3.06
Progressive Conservative	Steve Kidd	2,191	8.58	+0.17
Green	Larry Verner	437	1.71	+0.98
Total valid votes		25,533	99.18	
Total rejected, unmarked and declined ballots		211	0.82	+0.30
Turnout		25,744	53.76	–3.54
Eligible voters		47,891		
New Democratic hold		Swing		+2.48
Source: Elections Ontario

2003 Ontario general election
Party	Candidate	Votes	%	±%
New Democratic	Gilles Bisson	14,941	49.70	–3.20
Liberal	Michael Doody	12,373	41.16	+8.34
Progressive Conservative	Merv Russell	2,527	8.41	–4.86
Green	Marsha Gail Kriss	219	0.73	–
Total valid votes		30,060	99.48	
Total rejected, unmarked and declined ballots		158	0.52	–0.52
Turnout		30,218	57.30	–0.12
Eligible voters		52,737		
New Democratic hold		Swing		–5.77
Source: Elections Ontario

1999 Ontario general election
Party	Candidate	Votes	%
New Democratic	Gilles Bisson	16,504	52.90
Liberal	Yves Malette	10,238	32.82
Progressive Conservative	Marcel Pelchat	4,139	13.27
Independent	Ed Walsh	316	1.01
Total valid votes		31,197	98.96
Total rejected, unmarked and declined ballots		329	1.04
Turnout		31,526	57.42
Eligible voters		54,909	
New Democratic pickup new district.			
Source: Elections Ontario

== 2007 electoral reform referendum ==
2007 Ontario electoral reform referendum
Side	Votes	%
First Past the Post	18,494	77.3
Mixed member proportional	5,433	22.7
Total valid votes	23,927	100.0
