= Reesor, Ontario =

Reesor
- Unincorporated community/ghost town
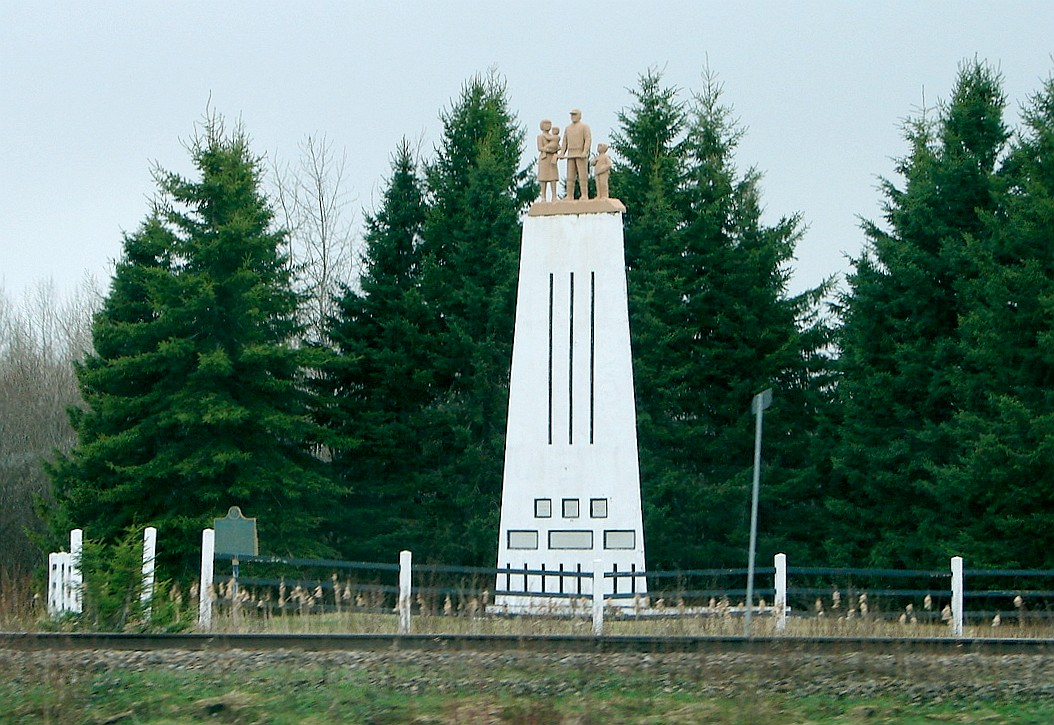
- Monument to the Reesor Siding Strike
- Interactive map of Reesor
- Coordinates: 49°34′21″N 83°4′42″W
- Country: Canada
- Province: Ontario
- District: Cochrane
- Municipality: Mattice-Val Côté
- Elevation: 240 m (800 ft)
- Time zone: UTC−5 (EST)
  - Summer (DST): UTC−4 (EDT)

Reesor is a ghost town located in Cochrane District, Ontario, Canada, along Highway 11 (Trans-Canada Highway), named after its founder, Thomas Reesor.

== History ==
Around 1925, Thomas Reesor (1867-1954), a Mennonite minister from Markham, Ontario, sponsored and helped to settle new German-speaking Mennonite immigrants from the Soviet Union in the area which would become known as Reesor.

In 1927, a school was built. By the fall of 1928, Reesor had 226 people living on 55 homesteads. A total of 35 acres (14 ha) of timbered land had been cleared for farming.

By the 1930s, the town included a freight station, a store, a lumberyard, a blacksmith shop, a garage, and a pool hall. The Reesor United Mennonite Church had begun services in 1926; a building and cemetery were added in the mid-1930s on Lot 26, Conc. II, McGowan Township, about 3 miles (4.8 km) north of the siding.

Besides the Mennonites, the area was also home to a small number of French Canadians.

The transition from cutting pulpwood to agriculture proved to be very difficult in Reesor. By 1935, Reesor's population had slipped to 150. The settlement continued to decline through the 1940s, 1950s and 1960s, as better opportunities opened in southern Ontario. The Mennonite congregation finally dissolved on 5 January 1948.

Logging continued to play a role with remaining settlers of the region. In 1963, Reesor-Siding (2.8 kilometres (1.7 mi) east of the Reesor community proper) was the site of the Reesor Siding Strike, one of the defining labour conflicts in Canadian history.

By the 1970s, all the businesses of Reesor had been closed.

In 2007, a play was written about the Mennonite settlement in Reesor by Lauren Taylor and Erin Brandenburg.
