= Victor M. Power =

Canadian politician (1934–2024)

Victor M. Power CM

Mayor of Timmins, Ontario
- In office 1980–1988
- Preceded by: Michael Doody
- Succeeded by: Dennis Welin
- In office 1991–2000
- Preceded by: Dennis Welin
- Succeeded by: Jamie Lim
- In office 2003–2006
- Preceded by: Jamie Lim
- Succeeded by: Tom Laughren

Personal details
- Born: Victor Michael Power; February 22, 1934
- Died: February 3, 2024 (aged 89)

Victor Michael Power CM (February 22, 1934 – February 3, 2024) was a Canadian politician and the longest-serving mayor of Timmins, Ontario. He served as mayor from 1980 to 1988, 1991 to 2000 and 2003 to 2006. Between 1991 and 2006, he worked to diversify the city's economy beyond mining, erased its debenture and highlighted its connection to Shania Twain. The airport in Timmins is named in his honour.

== Early life and education ==
Power was born in Timmins on February 22, 1934. He graduated from Timmins High and Vocational School in 1952, attended the University of Windsor and the University of Toronto, then worked as a teacher and guidance counsellor at his high school before entering municipal politics.

== Political career ==
Power was first elected to Timmins City Council as a city councillor in 1968, and served for twelve years before being elected mayor in 1980. His campaign that year attracted a bit of controversy when he stated his intentions to retain his job as a high school guidance counsellor concurrently with serving as mayor, amid a provincewide debate about whether Ontario's smaller cities needed full-time mayors or not, and whether most cities even paid their mayors enough for the job to be a person's sole source of income in the first place.

He served as mayor until 1988, when he was defeated by Dennis Welin. He returned for another term in 1991, during which he led the city to pay off its $16 million debenture debt by 2000.

=== First retirement ===
Power first announced his retirement from politics in 2000 and was succeeded as mayor by Jamie Lim.

=== Return as mayor ===
In the 2003 municipal election, Power challenged Lim and was reelected mayor.

Power also served as president of the Federation of Northern Ontario Municipalities, and as a director of Ontario Northland and the Association of Municipalities of Ontario.

Power's mayoralty was marked by ongoing efforts to diversify the city's mining-based economy. In 2004, he received national attention when he criticized the producers of Shania: A Life in Eight Albums, a television biopic of country star Shania Twain, for producing the film in Sudbury rather than Twain's actual hometown, Timmins.

=== Second retirement ===
On August 31, 2006, Power announced his second retirement from politics and that he would not seek the mayoralty in the 2006 elections. He was succeeded by Tom Laughren, the sole declared candidate.

== Legacy and death ==
On May 31, 2007, the city's airport was renamed Timmins/Victor M. Power Airport in honour of the former mayor. In attendance were several councillors and politicians from across the region. Power was named to the Order of Canada in 2009 and died on February 3, 2024, at the age of 89.
