= Timmins (provincial electoral district) =

Provincial electoral district in Ontario, Canada

Ontario electoral district
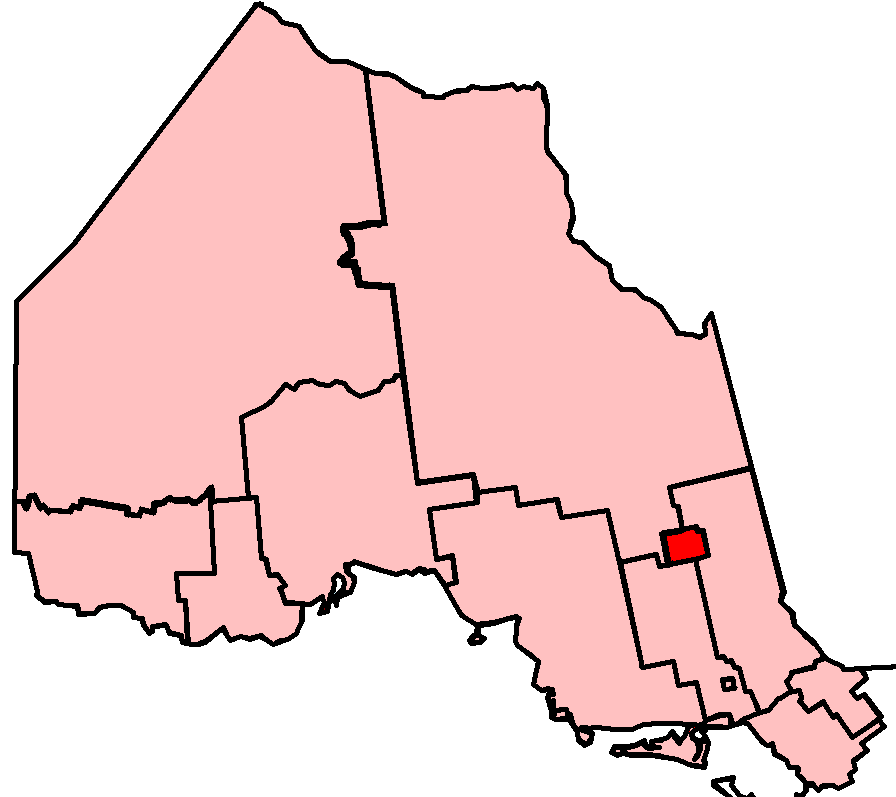
- Timmins in relation to other electoral districts in Northern Ontario
- Coordinates: 48.58°N 81.17°W

Provincial electoral district
- Legislature: Legislative Assembly of Ontario
MPP
George Pirie
Progressive Conservative
- District created: 2017
- First contested: 2018
- Last contested: 2025

Demographics
- Population (2016): 41,785
- Electors (2018): 32,867
- Area (km²): 3,155
- Pop. density (per km²): 13.2
- Census division: Cochrane
- Census subdivision: Timmins

Timmins is a provincial electoral district in Ontario, Canada. It elects one member to the Legislative Assembly of Ontario. This riding was established from the urban portion of the former riding of Timmins—James Bay on the recommendation of the Far North Electoral Boundaries Commission in 2017. The remainder of Timmins—James Bay became the Mushkegowuk—James Bay riding. The riding mirrors the boundaries of the city of Timmins.

== Members of Provincial Parliament ==
Assembly	Years	Member	Party
Riding created from Timmins—James Bay
42nd	2018–2022	Gilles Bisson	New Democratic
43rd	2022–2025	George Pirie	Progressive Conservative
44th	2025–present	George Pirie	Progressive Conservative

== Election results ==
Winning party in each polling division of Timmins at the 2025 Ontario general election

2025 Ontario general election
Party	Candidate	Votes	%	±%
Progressive Conservative	George Pirie	9,371	68.41	+3.60
New Democratic	Corey Lepage	2,732	19.94	–9.64
Liberal	Dominic Casto	1,127	8.23	N/A
Green	Marie-Josée Yelle	248	1.81	–0.43
New Blue	David Farrell	220	1.61	–1.31
Total valid votes/expense limit		13,698	98.94	–0.39
Total rejected, unmarked, and declined ballots		147	1.06	+0.39
Turnout		13,845	41.80	–1.74
Eligible voters		33,122		
Progressive Conservative hold		Swing		+6.62
Source: Elections Ontario

Winning party in each polling division of Timmins at the 2022 Ontario general election

2022 Ontario general election
Party	Candidate	Votes	%	±%	Expenditures
Progressive Conservative	George Pirie	9,356	64.81	+35.16	$28,384
New Democratic	Gilles Bisson	4,271	29.58	−27.85	$41,322
New Blue	David Farrell	421	2.92		$255
Green	Elizabeth Lockhard	323	2.24	+0.49	$0
Confederation of Regions	Nadia Sadiq	66	0.46		$0
Total valid votes/expense limit		14,437	99.33	+0.47	$46,740
Total rejected, unmarked, and declined ballots		98	0.67	-0.47	
Turnout		14,535	43.54	-4.58	
Eligible voters		33,345			
Progressive Conservative gain from New Democratic		Swing		+31.50	
Source(s): "Summary of Valid Votes Cast for Each Candidate" (PDF). Elections Ontario. 2022. Archived from the original on May 18, 2023.; "Statistical Summary by Electoral District" (PDF). Elections Ontario. 2022. Archived from the original on May 21, 2023.

2018 Ontario general election
Party	Candidate	Votes	%	±%	Expenditures
New Democratic	Gilles Bisson	8,978	57.43	+11.45	$47,438
Progressive Conservative	Yvan L. Génier	4,634	29.64	–1.70	$13,052
Liberal	Mickey Auger	1,378	8.81	–11.68	$16,014
Green	Lucas Blake Schinbeckler	273	1.75	–0.22	none listed
Northern Ontario	Gary Schaap	249	1.59	N/A	$860
Libertarian	Jozef Bauer	121	0.77	N/A	none listed
Total valid votes		15,633	98.86		
Total rejected, unmarked and declined ballots		181	1.14		
Turnout		15,814	48.12		
Eligible voters		32,867			
New Democratic notional hold		Swing		+6.58	
Source: Elections Ontario

2014 general election redistributed results
Party	Vote	%
New Democratic	6,718	45.98
Progressive Conservative	4,579	31.34
Liberal	2,994	20.49
Green	289	1.97
Others	32	0.22

== See also ==
- List of Ontario provincial electoral districts
- Canadian provincial electoral districts
