= Timmins City Council =

Governing body of Timmins, Ontario, Canada

Type
- Type: City Council

History
- Founded: 1912
- New session started: 1 December 2014

Leadership
- Mayor of Timmins: Michelle Boileau
- Seats: 9 Including Mayor

Elections
- Last election: 22 October 2018
- Next election: 24 October 2022

Meeting place
- Council Chambers

Website
- www.timmins.ca

Timmins City Council (French: Conseil municipal de Timmins) is the governing body for the city of Timmins, Ontario, Canada. As of August 2018 the council consists of the mayor and eight councillors from five wards. Four councillors represent Ward 5, while the other wards are represented by a single councillor each.

== Council members ==
=== 2018–2022 ===
- George Pirie, mayor (until 2 June 2022)
- Kristin Murray, acting mayor (from August 2022)
- Rock Whissell, Ward 1 Councillor
- Mickey Auger, Ward 2 Councillor
- Joe Campbell, Ward 3 Councillor
- John P. Curley, Ward 4 Councillor
- Andrew Marks, Ward 5 Councillor
- Kristin Murray, Ward 5 Councillor
- Noella Rinaldo, Ward 5 Councillor
- Michelle Boileau, Ward 5 Councillor

=== 2022–2026 ===
- Michelle Boileau, mayor
- Rock Whissell, Ward 1 Councillor
- Lorne Feldman, Ward 2 Councillor
- Bill Gvozdanovic, Ward 3 Councillor
- John P. Curley, Ward 4 Councillor
- Steve Black, Ward 5 Councillor
- Andrew Marks, Ward 5 Councillor
- Kristin Murray, Ward 5 Councillor
- Cory Robin, Ward 5 Councillor

== See also ==
- List of mayors of Timmins
