= Canadian Rivers Day =

Annual observance

Canadian Rivers Day

Canadian Rivers Day (French: Journée des rivières canadiennes) is held annually on the second Sunday in June to promote public awareness of the importance of preserving the heritage and health of Canada's rivers. Participating in Rivers Day helps to spread the message that rivers are vital to maintain a healthy ocean and a healthy earth.

== History ==
On June 21, 2002, the Minister of Canadian Heritage, Sheila Copps, signed a Ministerial Proclamation to declare that the second Sunday of June would be celebrated annually as Canadian Rivers Day. In British Columbia, Canadians had already been celebrating BC Rivers Day (founded by Mark Angelo) for over two decades and the day is now the largest rivers-related event in North America. This day was such a hit in British Columbia that there is now a World Rivers Day which was announced on June 29, 2005, and is celebrated annually on the last Sunday of September.

Among the groups calling for an annual Canadian Rivers Day was the Canadian Heritage Rivers Board, comprising representatives from the Government of Canada and all the provincial and territorial governments. Delegates to the 2001 Canadian Rivers Heritage Conference unanimously endorsed the same concept.

== Celebration ==
From the Yukon to Prince Edward Island, events are organized to commemorate Rivers Day. Celebrations include picnics, paddle-a-thons, voyageur canoeing, sharing river stories, creating river artwork, and taking a nature walk or a bicycle ride along a river.
