= Opasatika =

- Township (single-tier)
- Township of Opasatika; Canton d'Opasatika
- Aerial view of Opasatika

- Location within Ontario
- Coordinates: 49°32′N 82°52′W
- Country: Canada
- Province: Ontario
- District: Cochrane

Government
  - Mayor: Jacques Dorval
  - MP: Gaétan Malette (Conservative)
  - MPP: Guy Bourgouin (NDP)

Area
  - Land: 327.09 km^{2} (126.29 sq mi)

Population (2021)
  - Total: 200
  - Density: 0.6/km^{2} (1.6/sq mi)
- Time zone: UTC-5 (Eastern (EST))
  - Summer (DST): UTC-4 (EDT)
- Postal code: P0L 1Z0
- Area codes: 705, 249
- Website: opasatika.net

Opasatika is a township in the Canadian province of Ontario, located in the Cochrane District on the Opasatika River, a tributary of the Missinaibi River. Its name is of indigenous origin, meaning "surrounded by poplar".

The main communities in the township are Opasatika and Lowther, both located along Highway 11 between Mattice and Harty. The ghost town of Reesor Siding, site of the 1963 Reesor Siding incident, is at the western edge of the township. The former Canadian Forces Station Lowther was located in the municipality.

== Demographics ==
In the 2021 Census of Population conducted by Statistics Canada, Opasatika had a population of 200 living in 101 of its 110 total private dwellings, a change of −11.5% from its 2016 population of 226. With a land area of 327.09 km^{2} (126.29 sq mi), it had a population density of 0.6/km^{2} (1.6/sq mi) in 2021.

Canada census – Opasatika community profile

	2021	2016	2011
Population	200 (-11.5% from 2016)	226 (+5.6% from 2011)	214 (-23.6% from 2006)
Land area	327.09 km^{2} (126.29 sq mi)	330.44 km^{2} (127.58 sq mi)	329.98 km^{2} (127.41 sq mi)
Population density	0.6/km^{2} (1.6/sq mi)	0.7/km^{2} (1.8/sq mi)	0.6/km^{2} (1.6/sq mi)
Median age	57.2 (M: 58.0, F: 56.8)	53.7 (M: 53.2, F: 54.5)
Private dwellings	110 (total) 101 (occupied)	132 (total)	120 (total)
Median household income		$52,096

References: 2021 2016 2011

Historical census populations – Opasatika

Year	Pop.	±%
1976	740	—
1981	681	−8.0%
1986	647	−5.0%
1991	388	−40.0%
1996	349	−10.1%

Year	Pop.	±%
2001	325	−6.9%
2006	280	−13.8%
2011	214	−23.6%
2016	226	+5.6%
2021	200	−11.5%

Population figures based on revised counts. Population counts are not adjusted for boundary changes.
Source: Statistics Canada

Mother tongue (2021):

- English as first language: 32.5%
- French as first language: 62.5%
- English and French as first language: 2.5%
- Other as first language: 0%

== See also ==
- List of townships in Ontario
- List of francophone communities in Ontario
