= Michael Doody =

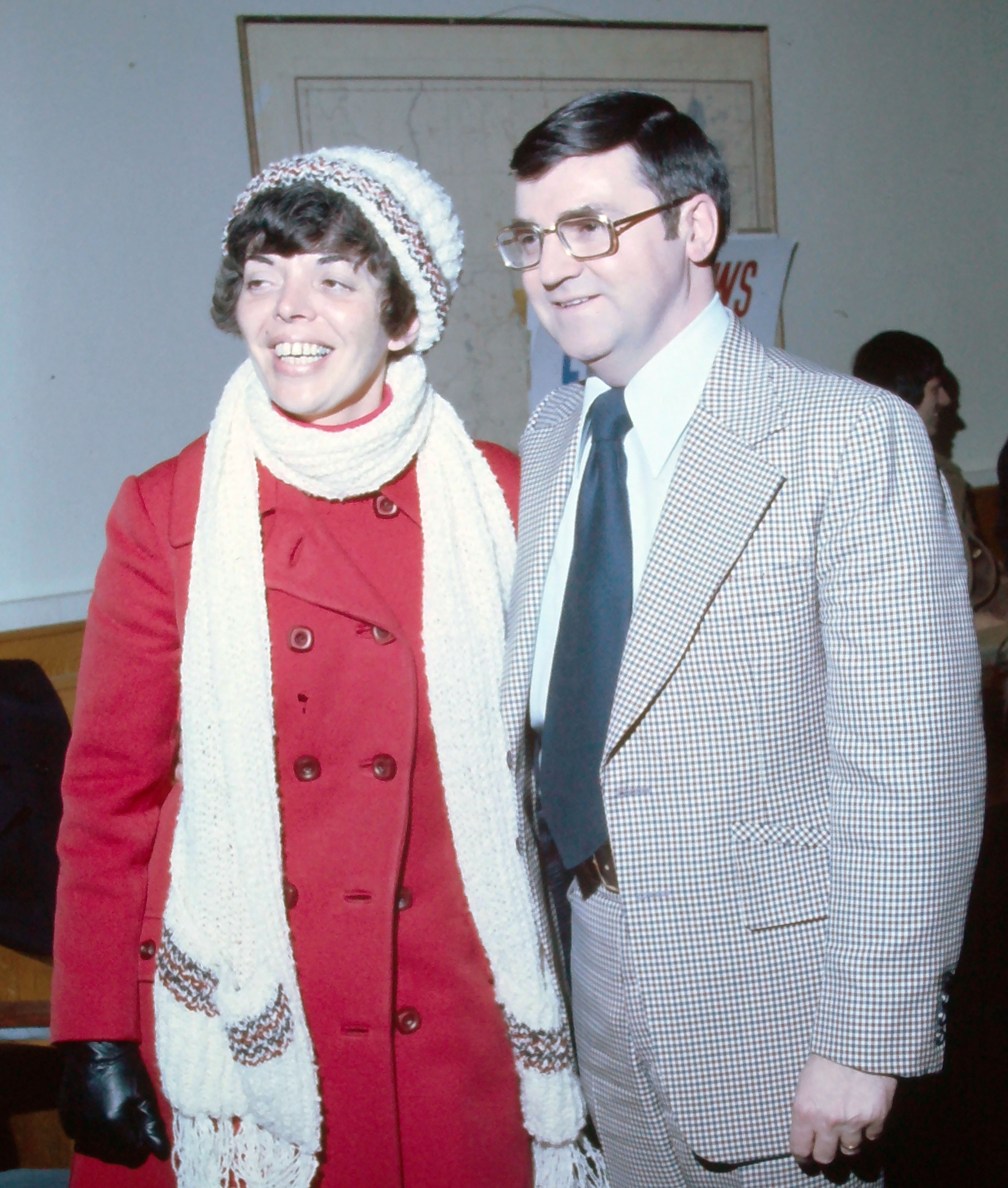

Mayor of Timmins, Ontario
- In office 1977–1980
- Preceded by: Leo Del Villano
- Succeeded by: Vic Power

Personal details
- Born: September 29, 1936 (age 89)
- Spouse: Charlene (Mira) Doody

Michael J. J. Doody (born September 29, 1936) is a Canadian politician, who served as mayor of Timmins, Ontario from 1977 to 1980.

== Early life ==
In 1959, Doody moved from his hometown of Val d'Or, Quebec to Timmins to work at CKGB-FM. In 1974, Doody began working at CFCL-TV and hosted a talk and current affairs show, Midday.

== Municipal politics ==
Doody was elected as a town councillor in 1970. He then ran for Mayor in 1976, defeating incumbent, Leo Del Villano, and served in this position from 1977 to 1980; two terms of office. He then exited politics until 1985, when he was elected as a councillor and remained in this position until 1996.

In 2005, Councillor Yves Malette left council and the mayor and city council asked Doody to step in for his ward. He was subsequently re-elected as a councillor in the 2006 municipal election, and retained this office in the 2010 municipal election.

Doody was re-elected in 2014 to a four-year term. He ran again seeking another four-year term in 2018, but was defeated.

== Provincial politics ==
Doody was the Ontario Liberal Party candidate for Timmins—James Bay in the 2003 provincial election, but lost to incumbent MPP Gilles Bisson. He has also served on the boards of the Association of Municipalities of Ontario and the Downtown Timmins Business Improvement Association.
