= Gaétan Malette =

Canadian politician

Gaétan Malette MP

Member of Parliament for Kapuskasing—Timmins—Mushkegowuk
- Incumbent
- Assumed office April 28, 2025
- Preceded by: Charlie Angus

Personal details
- Party: Conservative

Gaétan Malette is a Canadian politician and former forestry executive who is the member of Parliament (MP) for Kapuskasing—Timmins—Mushkegowuk, Ontario. A member of the Conservative Party, Malette was elected in the 2025 Canadian federal election.

== Early life and background ==
Malette was born and raised in Timmins, Ontario.

Before entering federal politics, Malette worked as a forestry executive and spent more than 45 years in the forestry and mining industries across Eastern Canada, often focusing on projects that promoted economic development in partnership with First Nations communities.

Malette has been active in community service and regional governance, holding a number of leadership positions. He previously served as chair of the Timmins & District Hospital, the Timmins District Roman Catholic Separate School Board, and the Timmins Francophone Community Health Centre. He was also vice-chair of the Timmins Police Services Board, a director of Mattagami AKI, and a commissioner with the Ontario Northland Transportation Commission. In the forestry sector, he has served as a director of the Canadian Lumber Manufacturing Association and chair of the Ontario Lumber Manufacturing Association.

== Political career ==
During his political campaign and subsequent parliamentary work, Malette has emphasized the importance of Northern Ontario’s natural resource industries, particularly forestry and mining, and their sustainable management. He has also focused on supporting economic development in Indigenous communities, addressing regional infrastructure challenges, and advocating for measures to alleviate the rising cost of living, including housing and food affordability, for residents of his riding.

== Electoral record ==
2025 Canadian federal election: Kapuskasing—Timmins—Mushkegowuk
| Party | Candidate | Votes | % | ±% | Expenditures |
|---|---|---|---|---|---|
| Conservative | Gaétan Malette | 23,062 | 48.9 | +23.77 | |
| Liberal | Steve Black | 18,366 | 39.0 | +12.75 | |
| New Democratic | Nicole Fortier Levesque | 4,895 | 10.4 | –25.50 | |
| People's | Serge Lefebvre | 814 | 1.7 | –10.48 | |
| Total valid votes/expense limit | | 47,137 | 99.1 | +0.1 | |
| Total rejected ballots | | 408 | 0.9 | -0.1 | |
| Turnout | | 47,545 | 63.0 | +7.6 | |
| Eligible voters | | 75,494 | | | |
| Conservative gain from New Democratic | | Swing | | +5.51 | |
Source: Elections Canada
