= Val Rita-Harty =

- Township municipality (single-tier)
- Township of Val Rita-Harty; Canton de Val Rita-Harty
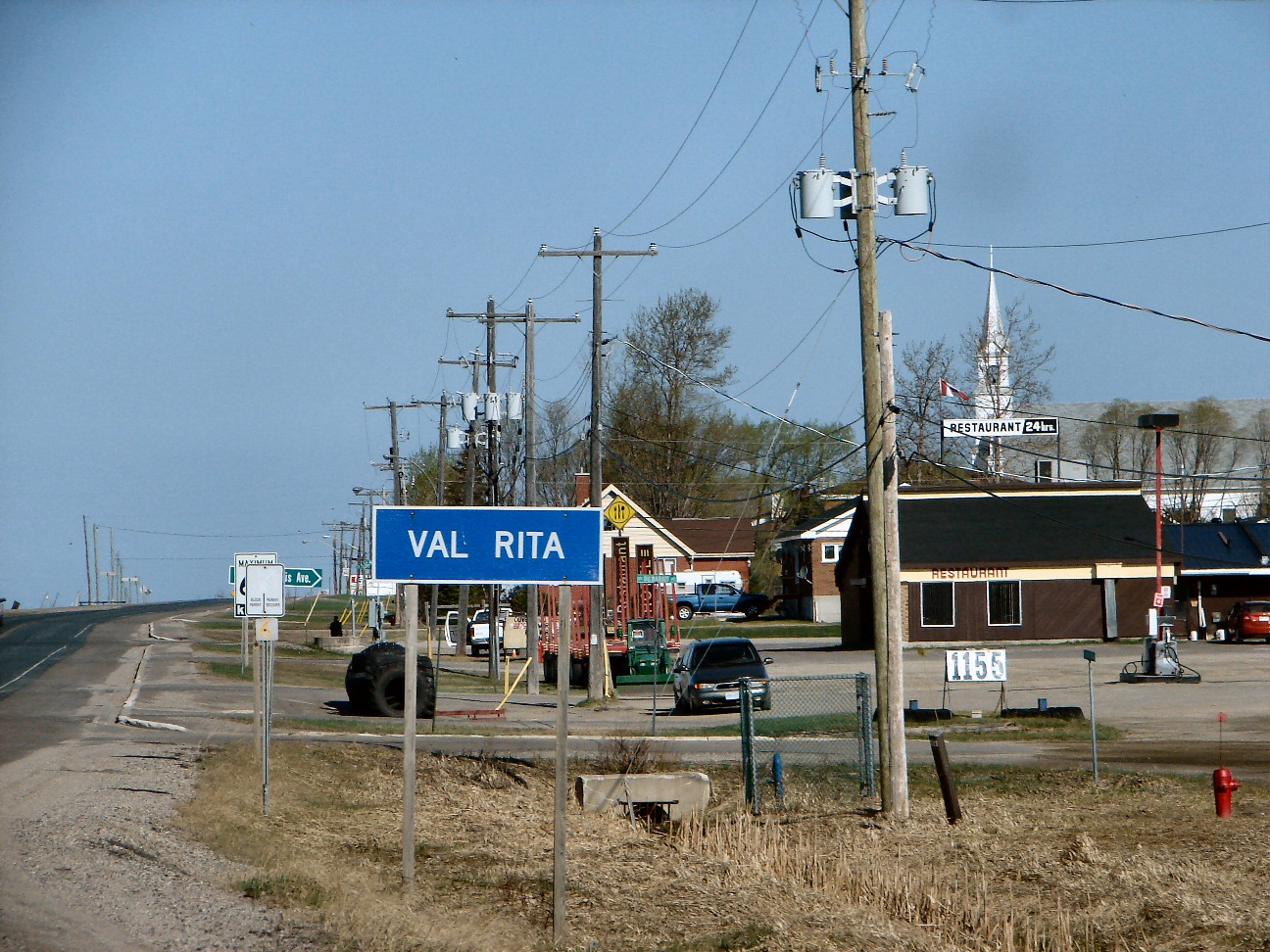
- Val Rita
- Motto: In Uno Spiritu (Latin: "One in spirit")
- Location in Ontario
- Coordinates: 49°29′02″N 82°37′47″W
- Country: Canada
- Province: Ontario
- District: Cochrane
- Settled: 1922
- Incorporated: 1973

Government
  - Mayor: Johanne Baril
  - MPs: Gaétan Malette (Conservative)
  - MPP: Guy Bourgouin (NDP)

Area
  - Land: 378.89 km^{2} (146.29 sq mi)

Population (2021)
  - Total: 757
  - Density: 2/km^{2} (5.2/sq mi)
- Time zone: UTC-5 (Eastern Time Zone (EST))
  - Summer (DST): UTC-4 (Eastern Time Zone (EDT))
- Postal code: P0L 2G0
- Area codes: 705, 249
- Website: www.valharty.ca

Val Rita-Harty is a township municipality in Cochrane District in Northeastern Ontario, Canada.

The township consists of two communities, Val Rita and Harty, both located along Highway 11 between Opasatika and Kapuskasing. It was incorporated as a township in 1973, following a failed community effort in 1964 to request incorporation as a municipality. It was originally known as the Township of Owens, Williamson and Idington, but renamed in 1983 after its main communities.

== History ==
The area opened to development when the National Transcontinental Railway was built in 1900s. In 1922, the first pioneer families from Foleyet arrived at Val Rita (originally called Secord after the name of the railroad station). In 1926, the Ste-Rita Parish was founded, followed by the St-Stanislas Parish in Harty in 1932.

In 1961, first effort began to incorporate the place as a municipality, but was denied. In 1971, another request was made and in 1973, the township was incorporated, with Joseph Étienne Tremblay acclaimed as first reeve.

In 1983, a sewage system was installed in Harty. In 1984, cable television service became available in Val Rita, and in 1989 in Harty.

== Demographics ==
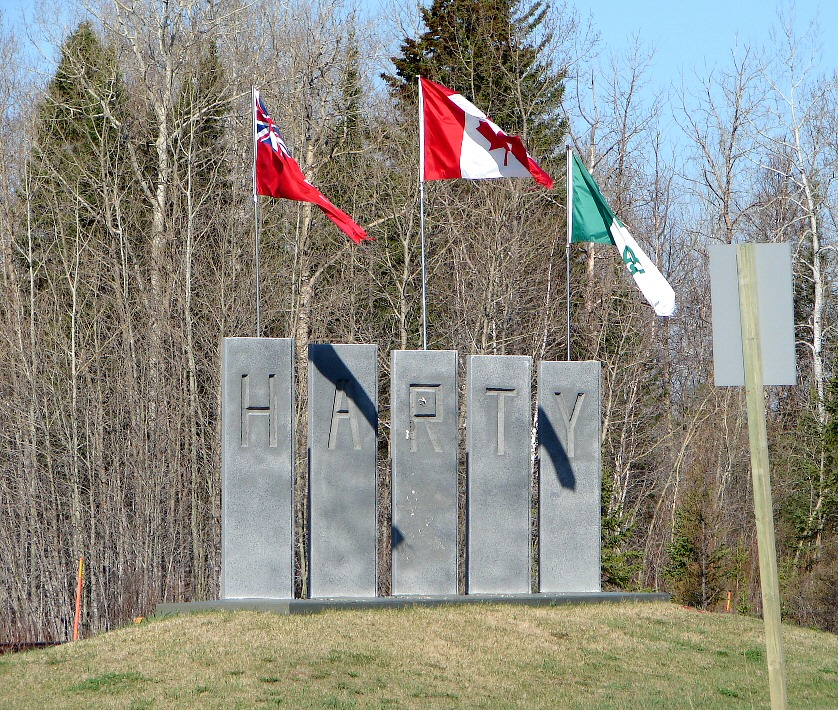
Welcome sign in Harty

In the 2021 Census of Population conducted by Statistics Canada, Val Rita-Harty had a population of 757 living in 326 of its 382 total private dwellings, a change of −0.7% from its 2016 population of 762. With a land area of 378.89 km^{2} (146.29 sq mi), it had a population density of 2.0/km^{2} (5.2/sq mi) in 2021.

Canada census – Val Rita-Harty community profile

	2021	2016	2011
Population	757 (-0.7% from 2016)	762 (-6.7% from 2011)	817 (-13.0% from 2006)
Land area	378.89 km^{2} (146.29 sq mi)	381.18 km^{2} (147.17 sq mi)	382.71 km^{2} (147.77 sq mi)
Population density	2.0/km^{2} (5.2/sq mi)	2.0/km^{2} (5.2/sq mi)	2.1/km^{2} (5.4/sq mi)
Median age	48.4 (M: 50.8, F: 46.4)	46.6 (M: 47.2, F: 45.9)
Private dwellings	382 (total) 326 (occupied)	357 (total) 330 (occupied)	368 (total)
Median household income	$81,000	$66,560

References: 2021 2016 2011

Historical census populations – Val Rita-Harty

Year	Pop.	±%
1976	1,469	—
1981	1,518	+3.3%
1986	1,317	−13.2%
1991	1,178	−10.6%
1996	1,112	−5.6%

Year	Pop.	±%
2001	1,012	−9.0%
2006	939	−7.2%
2011	817	−13.0%
2016	762	−6.7%
2021	757	−0.7%

Population counts are not adjusted for boundary changes.
Source: Statistics Canada

Mother tongue (as of 2021):

- English as first language: 22.5%
- French as first language: 70.9%
- English and French as first languages: 4.0%
- Other as first language: 2.6%

== See also ==
- List of townships in Ontario
- List of francophone communities in Ontario
