= George Pirie (politician) =

Canadian politician

The Honourable George Pirie ECO MPP
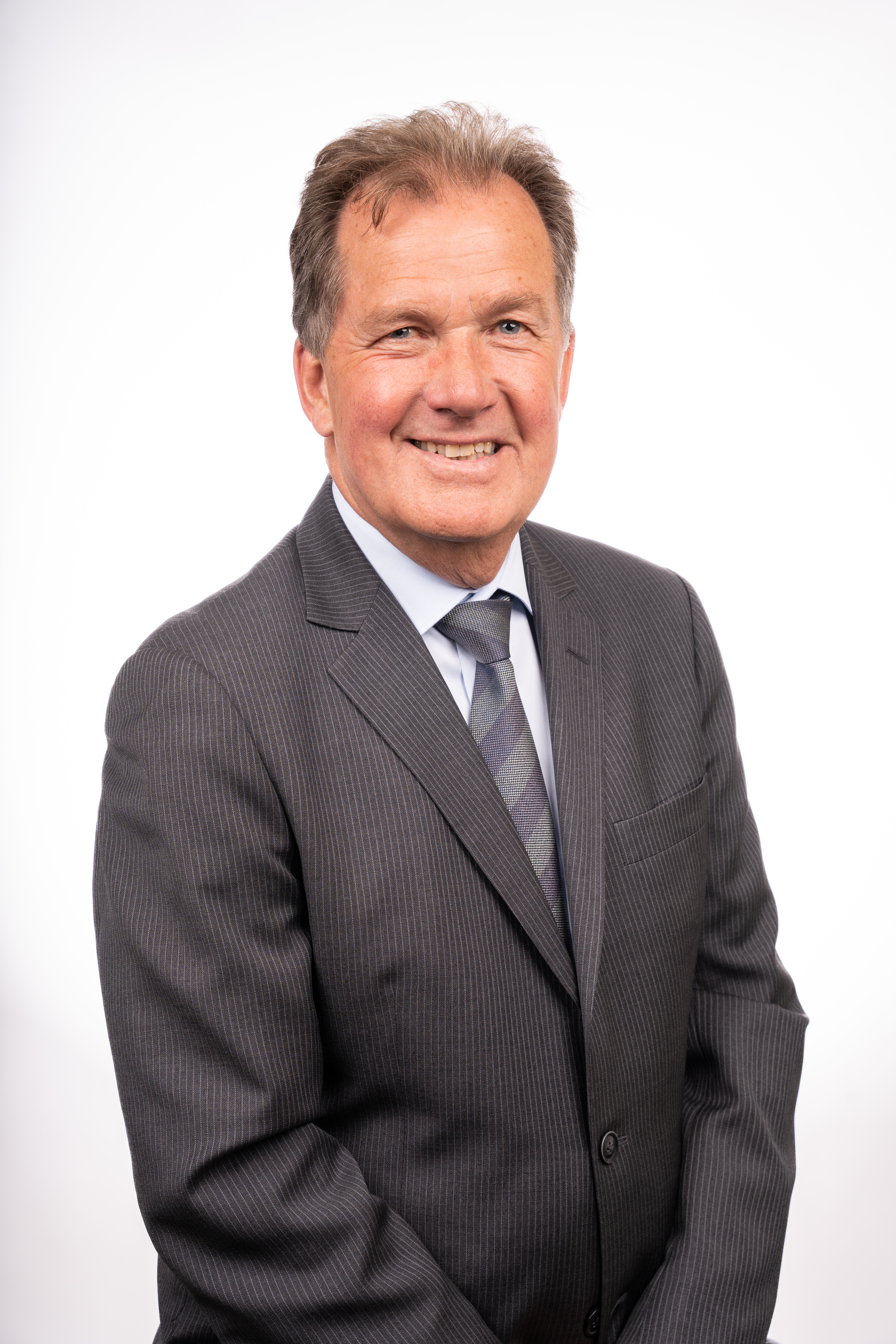
- Pirie in 2024

Minister of Mines

Member of Parliament for Timmins
- Incumbent
- Assumed office June 2, 2022
- Preceded by: Gilles Bisson

Mayor of Timmins, Ontario
- In office December 1, 2018 – June 2, 2022
- Preceded by: Steve Black
- Succeeded by: Michelle Boileau

Personal details
- Party: Progressive Conservative

George Pirie MPP is a Canadian politician, who was elected to the Legislative Assembly of Ontario in the 2022 provincial election. He represents the riding of Timmins as a member of the Progressive Conservative Party of Ontario. He defeated Gilles Bisson who was first elected in 1990, taking the seat from the Ontario New Democratic Party for the first time in 32 years.

At the time of his election as MPP, Pirie had been Mayor of Timmins since 2018.

== Electoral history ==
2025 Ontario general election: Timmins
| Party | Candidate | Votes | % | ±% |
|---|---|---|---|---|
| Progressive Conservative | George Pirie | 9,371 | 68.41 | +3.60 |
| New Democratic | Corey Lepage | 2,732 | 19.94 | –9.64 |
| Liberal | Dominic Casto | 1,127 | 8.23 | N/A |
| Green | Marie-Josée Yelle | 248 | 1.81 | –0.43 |
| New Blue | David Farrell | 220 | 1.61 | –1.31 |
| Total valid votes/expense limit | | 13,698 | 98.94 | –0.39 |
| Total rejected, unmarked, and declined ballots | | 147 | 1.06 | +0.39 |
| Turnout | | 13,845 | 41.80 | –1.74 |
| Eligible voters | | 33,122 | | |
| Progressive Conservative hold | | Swing | | +6.62 |
Source: Elections Ontario

2022 Ontario general election: Timmins
| Party | Candidate | Votes | % | ±% | Expenditures |
|---|---|---|---|---|---|
| Progressive Conservative | George Pirie | 9,356 | 64.81 | +35.16 | $28,384 |
| New Democratic | Gilles Bisson | 4,271 | 29.58 | −27.85 | $41,322 |
| New Blue | David Farrell | 421 | 2.92 | | $255 |
| Green | Elizabeth Lockhard | 323 | 2.24 | +0.49 | $0 |
| Confederation of Regions | Nadia Sadiq | 66 | 0.46 | | $0 |
| Total valid votes/expense limit | | 14,437 | 99.33 | +0.47 | $46,740 |
| Total rejected, unmarked, and declined ballots | | 98 | 0.67 | -0.47 | |
| Turnout | | 14,535 | 43.54 | -4.58 | |
| Eligible voters | | 33,345 | | | |
| Progressive Conservative gain from New Democratic | | Swing | | +31.50 | |
Source(s): "Summary of Valid Votes Cast for Each Candidate" (PDF). Elections Ontario. 2022. Archived from the original on 2023-05-18.; "Statistical Summary by Electoral District" (PDF). Elections Ontario. 2022. Archived from the original on 2023-05-21.
