= Mattice-Val Côté =

- Township (single-tier)
- Township of Mattice-Val Côté; Canton de Mattice-Val Côté
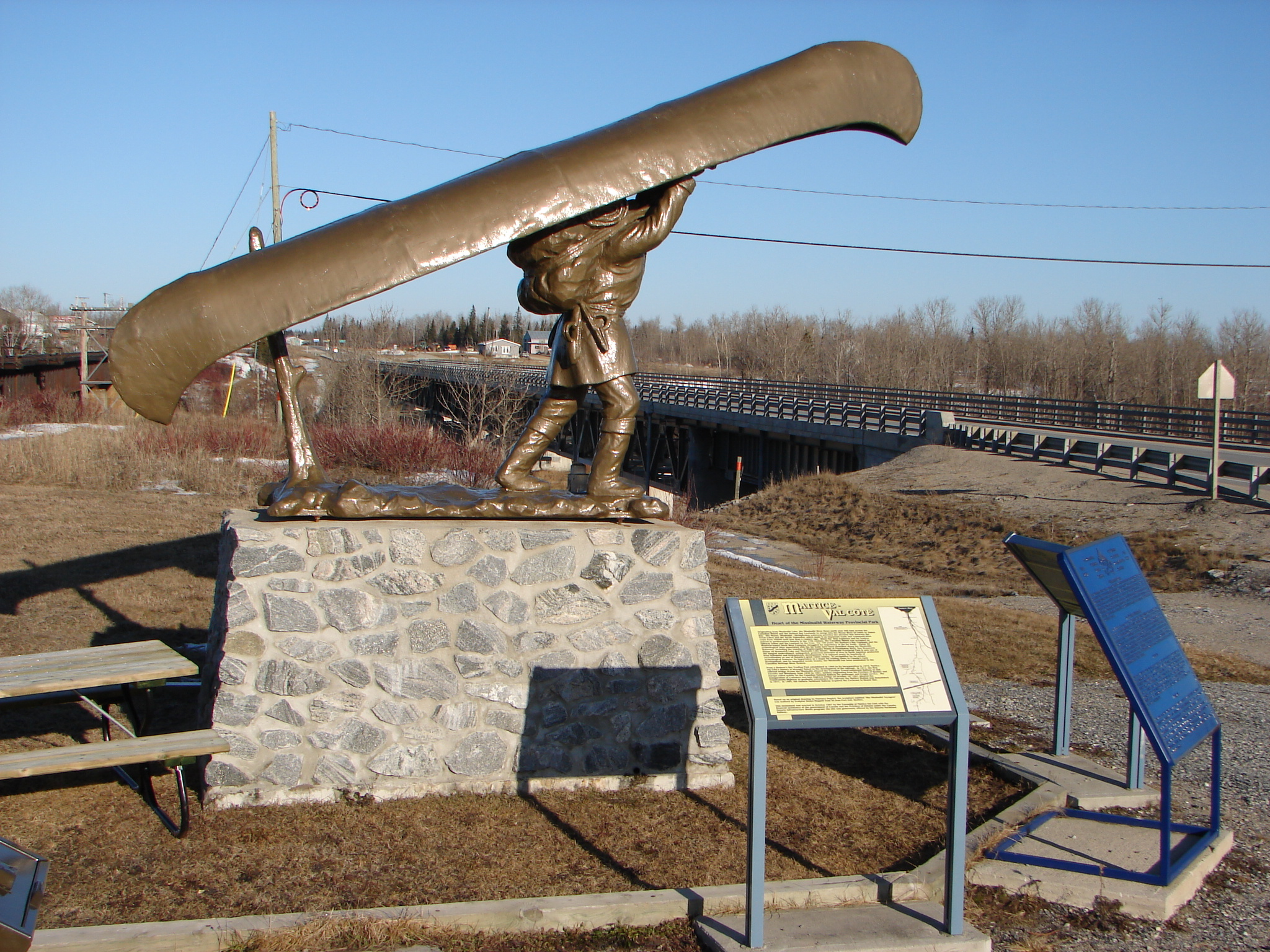
- Voyageur statue in Mattice, with bridge over the Missinaibi River in the background
- Motto: In Futuro Spes
- Location of Mattice-Val-Côté in Ontario
- Coordinates: 49°38′45″N 83°17′13″W
- Country: Canada
- Province: Ontario
- District: Cochrane
- Settled: 1910s
- Incorporated: April 18, 1975

Government
  - Mayor: Marc Dupuis
  - MP: Gaétan Malette (Conservative)
  - MPP: Guy Bourgouin (NDP)

Area
  - Land: 412.81 km^{2} (159.39 sq mi)
- Elevation: 232 m (761 ft)

Population (2021)
  - Total: 524
  - Density: 1.3/km^{2} (3.4/sq mi)
- Time zone: UTC-5 (EST)
  - Summer (DST): UTC-4 (EDT)
- Postal code FSA: P0L
- Area codes: 705, 249
- Website: matticevalcote.ca

Mattice-Val Côté is an incorporated township in Cochrane District in Northeastern Ontario, Canada. It is located approximately 30 kilometres (19 mi) east of Hearst and 70 kilometres (43 mi) west of Kapuskasing on Ontario Highway 11.

The township was incorporated on April 18, 1975, as the United Townships of Eilber and Devitt, with Paul Zorzetto as first reeve. Its two primary population centres are Mattice and Val-Côté. Mattice is located on the Missinaibi River, a historic fur-trading route that flows into the Moose River, then into James Bay. The river is a popular destination for canoers, known for its historical significance.

== History ==
Mattice

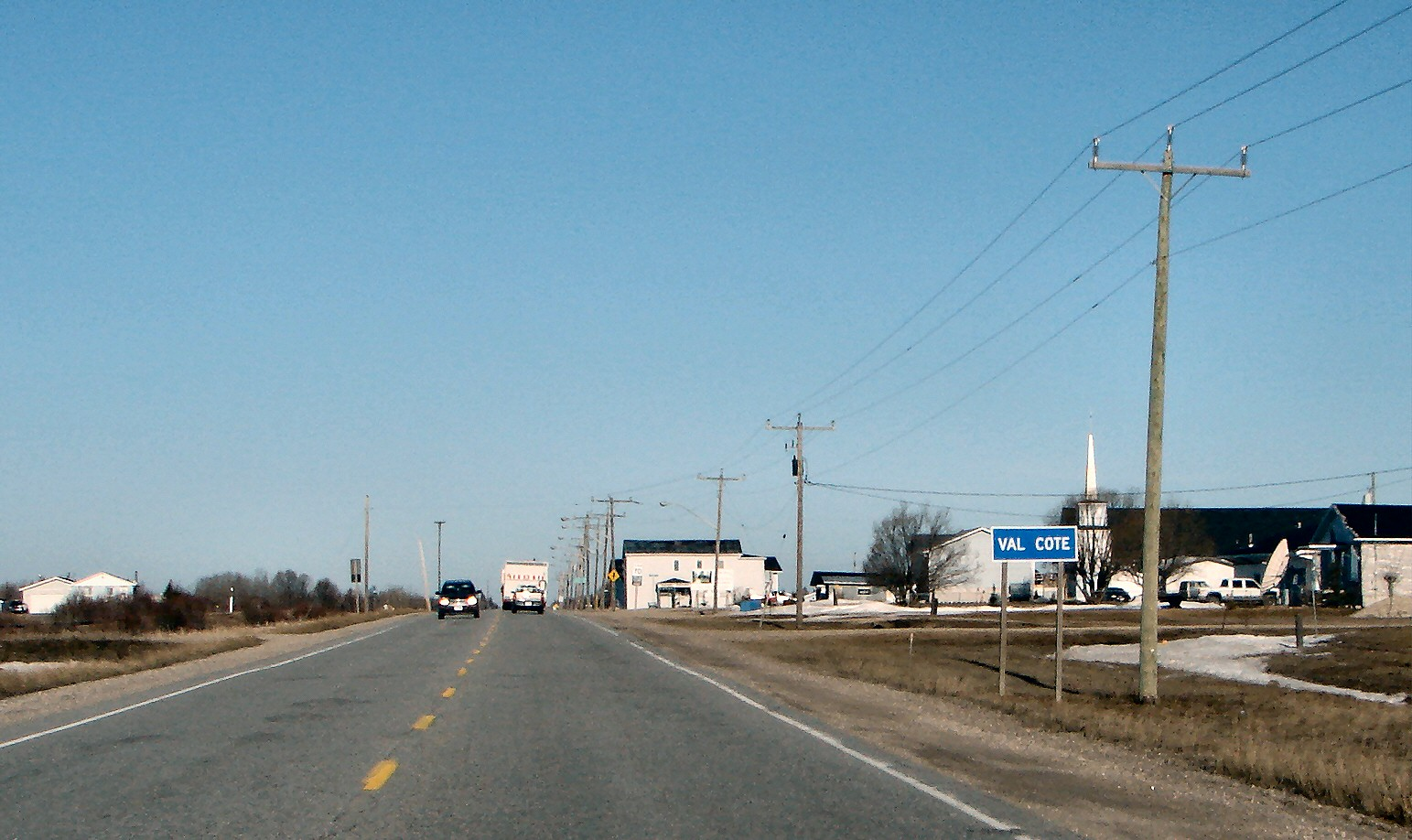
Val Côté

Mattice was founded in the 1910s, fueled by the arrival of the National Transcontinental Railway and free land given away by the government. Most residents came from the province of Quebec.

The town was named after Gregor Lenox Mattice. He was born July 26, 1872, in Cornwall Township, Ontario, Canada, and died April 1, 1940, in Montreal, Quebec, Canada. Major Gregor Lenox Mattice was educated at the Royal Military College, Kingston, Ontario, Canada, and graduated as a civil engineer. For a time he was with the Grand Trunk Pacific Railway (now the Canadian National Railway) as District Engineer, with headquarters at Cochrane, Ontario. He had charge of construction between Hearst and Cochrane. When the road was completed, the field office was named Mattice in his honor. When a town built up around the field office, the town was also named Mattice.

== Demographics ==
In the 2021 Census of Population conducted by Statistics Canada, Mattice-Val Côté had a population of 542 living in 241 of its 260 total private dwellings, a change of −16.4% from its 2016 population of 648. With a land area of 412.81 km^{2} (159.39 sq mi), it had a population density of 1.3/km^{2} (3.4/sq mi) in 2021.

Canada census – Mattice-Val Côté community profile

	2021	2016	2011
Population	542 (-16.4% from 2016)	648 (-5.5% from 2011)	686 (-11.1% from 2006)
Land area	412.81 km^{2} (159.39 sq mi)	414.00 km^{2} (159.85 sq mi)	414.64 km^{2} (160.09 sq mi)
Population density	1.3/km^{2} (3.4/sq mi)	1.6/km^{2} (4.1/sq mi)	1.7/km^{2} (4.4/sq mi)
Median age	49.6 (M: 49.2, F: 50.4)	51.1 (M: 51.5, F: 50.6)
Private dwellings	260 (total) 241 (occupied)	338 (total)	353 (total)
Median household income	$83,000	$56,405

References: 2021 2016 2011

Historical census populations – Mattice-Val Côté

Year	Pop.	±%
1976	1,272	—
1981	1,254	−1.4%
1986	1,107	−11.7%
1991	1,015	−8.3%
1996	935	−7.9%

Year	Pop.	±%
2001	891	−4.7%
2006	772	−13.4%
2011	686	−11.1%
2016	648	−5.5%
2021	542	−16.4%

Source: Statistics Canada

Mother tongue (2021):

- English as first language: 10.1 %
- French as first language: 81.7 %
- English and French as first languages: 6.4 %
- Other as first language: 1.8 %

== Economy ==
A majority of residents work in nearby Hearst and Opasatika in the lumber industry. Opasatika's mill is now shut down. Other residents work in the service industry.

A group of local women entrepreneurs have banded together to open a clothing company which manufactures polar fleece clothing, ideal for the cold winter conditions of the area.

== Tourist attractions ==
The Municipality of Mattice-Val-Côté has set up a rest and camp area on the right bank of the Missinaibi River so that canoe enthusiasts can sleep, shower, rest and visit the sites. The municipality has also erected a sculpture depicting a voyageur portaging along the river.

Mattice is home to a historical First Nations cemetery, located two kilometers south of town. It had been abandoned in the 1940s but has now been cleaned up and can be accessed by road or by canoe on the Missinaibi River.

A rock museum opened in Val-Côté in 2002.

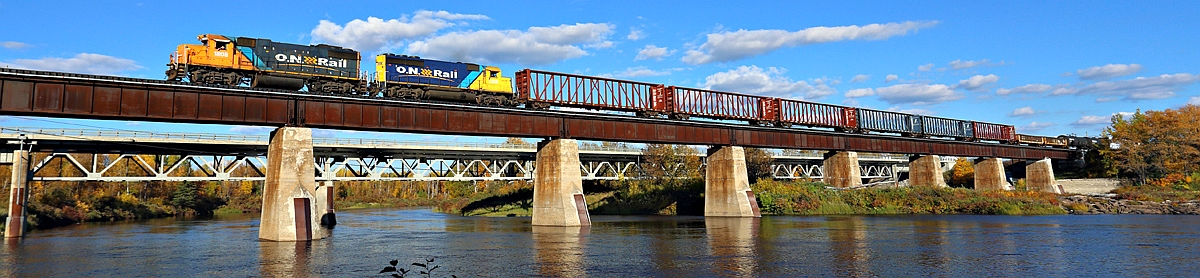
Ontario Northland freigh train crossing the Missinaibi River at Mattice-Val Côté in Northern Ontario

=== Festivals ===
The Carnaval Missinaïbi (winter carnival) is held over the course of two weeks in the end of February/beginning of March every winter. Activities include snowmobile rallies, music concerts, and kids activities. The Carnaval is best known in the area for its generous prizes (vehicles and money) given away in the Carnival draw.

The first "journées médiévales" (Medieval Days) took place in the summer of 2006, inspired by a similar activity in a small Quebec town. The festival takes place at the baseball field of Mattice on the last weekend of August. This festival features the naming of a king and queen for the day, a competition to become a knight, a lot of family activities, a variety of different expositions and a meal without utensils.

Canadian Rivers Day has been celebrated for four years with organized trips on the Missinaibi River, educational sessions and family activities.

== Sports ==
Residents and visitors enjoy outdoor sports such as hunting, fishing, snowmobiling, camping, swimming and canoeing. It is a popular spot for anglers and hunters.

== Education ==
The local grade school is called École catholique St-François-Xavier where students go from kindergarten to grade 8. High school students are bussed to École Secondaire catholique Hearst.

== See also ==
- List of townships in Ontario
- List of francophone communities in Ontario
