= Sturgeon Falls Education Crisis =

Political crisis in Ontario, Canada

The Sturgeon Falls Education Crisis (French: Crise scolaire de Sturgeon Falls) was a 1971 language-rights conflict in Ontario centered on the provision of French-language education for the Franco-Ontarian community in Sturgeon Falls, Northern Ontario.

== Background ==
Historically, anglophone governments in Ontario have attempted to suppress the French language, especially in education, such as through the Regulation 17, which outlawed education in the French language in the province. Despite the repeal of Regulation 17 in 1927, it would take until 1968 for the Ontarian government to officially recognise and fund French-language public schools.

The late 1960s also saw a schism form between the francophones in Quebec, and the other francophone communities of Canada, notably the francophones in Ontario. The emergence of a separate québécois identity during the Quiet Revolution; also resulted in the development of a unique Franco-Ontarian identity, with francophones in Ontario forced to re-conceptualize their identities without relying on francophones in Quebec. In 1969, following the advice of the Royal Commission on Bilingualism and Biculturalism, Ontario's premier John Robarts made French an official language of the Ontario Legislative Assembly in 1970.

== Crisis ==
Despite 80% of the population of Sturgeon Falls being francophone, the Nipissing School Board refused to create a French-language high school in the town after the Ontarian government began allowing French-language public schools in 1968. At the time, the board of administration of the North Bay and District Board of Education was composed of 17 members, of which only three were francophone, and there were 1600 secondary school students in the region, of which 1200 were francophone. The North Bay and District Board of Education argued that it would cost too much money to have a separate school for the only 400 Anglophone students and so the only secondary school in the town would remain Anglophone.

On 1 January 1969, 300 Franco-Ontarians gathered to protest calling for the Board of Education to create a francophone high school. As the demonstration was only loosely-organised, however, the Board of Education ignored it.

In March 1970, a petition with 2277 signatures of parents and Franco-Ontarian students was presented to the school board for the creation of a francophone school, but was denied. After the refusal of the petition, 500 francophone students in the region announced their intentions to launch a strike, and would refuse to enroll at the beginning of the next term. In April, francophone teachers announced their intentions to join the strike, and formed the Association d'éducation de l'Ouest Nipissing (AÉON).

Ahead of the 1970-71 scholastic year, the North Bay and District Board of Education created a compromise mixed-language high school, where one side of the school would be francophone and the other side of the building would be Anglophone, however that school quickly found itself mired in conflict. Throughout the year, various school board meetings and AÉON meetings were held, both in Sturgeon Falls and in nearby towns, such as North Bay, often attended by hundreds of people and with police sometimes forced to sneak the school board administrators away from the unrest. At the end of the school year, the school's principal, Hubert Trudel, resigned, stating that it was the most impossible school to manage in Ontario.

During the summer of 1971, francophone students created the Comité d'action étudiante to continue to fight for a francophone school. That summer, two francophone newspapers, Le Journal and Coup d'oeil, were also formed to report on the crisis, and another petition was launched, collecting the signatures of 75 of the 106 teachers at the mixed-language school. On 2 August, Premier Bill Davis was approached on the subject during a visit to North Bay and refused to get involved, stating that the school board was autonomous.

On 1 September 1971, the Comité d'action étudiante announced its intention to launch a strike and civil disobedience campaign to prevent the school from beginning its 1971–72 school year. On 7 September, the scheduled first day of classes and the crisis still unresolved, the students went on strike, forming a picket line outside the school, blocking all the entrances. The next day, the Association canadienne-française de l'Ontario (ACFO) and Franco-Ontarian newspaper Le Droit launched Opération anti-assimilation to rally support for the students. On 13 September, a protest march was held through the city in support of the strike and a new petition was launched, gathering over 3200 signatures. The first period of the strike saw significant tensions, including bomb threats, the mayor's car being vandalised, an effigy of the school board being burned in front of the school, and supporters of the strike being stalked in the middle of the night, having their phone lines tapped, and harassed with accusations of being communists and separatists in broad daylight.

By the end of September, the North Bay and District Board of Education still refusing to create a francophone secondary school and the crisis attracting widespread public and media attention and support, including from Ontario NDP leader Stephen Lewis and Ontario Liberal Party leader Robert Nixon, 200 students launched an occupation of the school building. In response, the Board of Education announced that the Anglophone half of the school and the francophone half would both be granted separate administrations, albeit they would both remain in the same building.

In October, in the middle of the 1971 Ontario general election, the provincial government launched the Ministerial Commission on French-Language Secondary Education (French: Commission ministérielle sur l’éducation secondaire en langue française en Ontario), also known as the Symons Commission in an attempt to resolve the crisis. On 8 December 1971, the Commission submitted its initial findings, recommending the creation of a francophone secondary school in Sturgeon Falls. A week later, the North Bay and District Board of Education announced that it had accepted in principle to build a francophone school, stating that the government had assured them of financial assistance for the construction. The École secondaire catholique Franco-Cité would be born and the crisis resolved.

== Aftermath ==
The 1970s would see a number of other significant protests for Franco-Ontarian rights. The École secondaire Le Caron was created after French speakers in the Penetanguishene region opened the École secondaire de la Huronie, a parallel and illegal French-language school nicknamed the "school of resistance." The C'est l'temps civil disobedience campaign led to the Ontario justice system becoming officially bilingual in 1984 and then the French Language Services Act in 1986. The 1970s also saw continued growth in Franco-Ontarian identity, such as the creation of the Franco-Ontarian flag and the beginnings of the movement to create a Francophone university in Ontario, which eventually led to the opening of the Université de l'Ontario français in 2021.

== See also ==
- S.O.S. Montfort
- 2018 Franco-Ontarian Black Thursday
