= Summit on the Rapprochement of Canadian Francophonies =

The Summit on the Rapprochement of Canadian Francophonies (French: Sommet sur le rapprochement des francophonies canadiennes) was a summit between the different francophone communities in Canada in June 2021.

== Background ==
Most Canadian native speakers of French live in Quebec, the only province where French is the majority and the sole official language. There are, however, sizeable francophone communities in other provinces, such as New Brunswick, the only officially fully bilingual province, and Manitoba and Ontario, whose governments are officially semi-bilingual, required to provide services in French where justified by the number of francophones. Smaller francophone communities exist in every other province and territory, supported by French-language institutions. By the 1969 Official Languages Act, both English and French are recognized as official languages in Canada and granted equal status by the federal government.

The emergence of a separate québécois identity during the Quiet Revolution in the 1950s and 1960s saw a schism form between the francophones in Quebec, and the other francophone communities of Canada. The schism led to an increase in tensions between Québec and other francophone communities. Quebec writer Yves Beauchemin once controversially referred to the Franco-Ontarian community as "warm corpses" (« cadavres encore chauds ») who had no chance of surviving as a community. In a similar vein, former Quebec Premier René Lévesque referred to them as "dead ducks".

== Proposals for a summit ==
Between 1966 and 1969, the Estates General of French Canada were held in Montréal. Organised by the Ligue d'action nationale and coordinated by the Fédération des Sociétés Saint-Jean-Baptistes du Québec (FSSJBQ), the stated objective of these Estates General was to consult the French-Canadian people on their constitutional future. The Estates General marked the last time a Canada-wide summit of francophones would take place for over 50 years.

In the 2000s and 2010s, however, tensions between Québec and francophone communities elsewhere in Canada calmed and pan-Canadian francophone solidarity began to emerge as an important force. The late 2010s and early 2020s also brought a number of major political moments for Canadian francophonie, such as the 2018 Franco-Ontarian Black Thursday, debates on the modernisation of the federal Official Languages Act, and the ascension of Blaine Higgs, a former anti-bilingualism activist, to the Premiership of New Brunswick.

The Francophone Assembly of Ontario issued a report with six key recommendations for rapprochement between Franco-Ontarians and Québec, including the creation of a mandate to hold talks between different francophone communities in Canada, studying francophone student motility across Canada, official recognition from the government of Québec of francophone groups outside of Québec as spokesorganisations for their respective communities, and holding annual summits on Canadian francophonie.

== Summit ==
On 7 May 2019, the government of Québec and the Fédération des communautés francophones et acadienne du Canada officially announced that the Summit would be held in June 2020. Québec Minister of International Relations and La Francophonie Sonia LeBel stated that "the linguistic crises of preceding months have led to a renewed interest in Québec for francophone and Acadian communities in Canada." In April 2020, the Summit was delayed by a year due to the COVID-19 pandemic in Canada.

In April 2021, the official schedule for the Summit was released. The Summit was due to begin on 12 June 2021, with over 600 delegates expected to attend virtually, and was planned to finish on 17 June.

== Reactions ==
Some commentators noted that universities could play a major in francophone solidarity, with Association francophone pour le savoir president François Charbonneau noting that pan-Canadian francophone collaboration often happens through formal institutions. University of Ottawa professor Linda Cardinal stated that "we need to build a more pan-Canadian vision of Francophonie, without forgetting that there are diverse communities, but so that we create a situation where participation in Francophonie outside of Québec is valued."

Other commentators argued that the Summit would be a good starting point for a more ambitious Francophonie in Canada, and argued for increased material support from governments, especially the government of Québec.

Jean Johnson, president of the Fédération des communautés francophones et acadienne du Canada, argued that the summit was a chance to expand francophone Canadian culture, stating that "You've heard of us through our struggles. You've heard of S.O.S. Montfort, of the Université de l'Ontario français, of the debates happening now at the University of Alberta Campus Saint-Jean. But with this summit, I'm hoping you'll learn about us through what we've built. Our creations, our business, our education, our healthcare, our diversity, etc..."

The efforts of Sonia LeBel in organising the summit also received applause.
