= 2018 Franco-Ontarian Black Thursday =

Franco-Ontarian Black Thursday
- French: Jeudi noir des Franco-Ontariens
- The Franco-Ontarian flag
- Date: 15 November 2018
- Result: Federal funding for the UOF; Continuation of the French Language Services Commissioner under the Ombudsperson's Office

Parties
Government of Ontario: Ford ministry	Franco-Ontarians: Assemblee de la francophonie de l'Ontario; Université de l'Ontario français; CUPE	Government of Canada: Ministry of Economic Development and Official Languages

Lead figures
Doug Ford; Caroline Mulroney	Amanda Simard	Justin Trudeau; Mélanie Joly

The 2018 Franco-Ontarian Black Thursday (French: Jeudi noir des Franco-Ontariens de 2018) occurred on 15 November 2018, when the government of Ontario, led by Doug Ford, announced a number of cuts to Franco-Ontarian institutions in the province, notably the elimination of the office of the French Language Services Commissioner and of the soon-to-be-opened Université de l'Ontario français. The cuts provoked a significant backlash from the Franco-Ontarian community, leading to the largest mass mobilisations in Franco-Ontarian history, surpassing those of S.O.S. Montfort two decades earlier, and leading to the government of Ontario mostly backing down from the cuts.

== Background ==
With a population measuring close to a million and a historical presence dating back to the 1600s, the francophone community in Ontario is one of the largest minority groups in the province. Franco-Ontarians, however, have historically faced oppression from the anglophone majority, notably the Regulation 17, which outlawed education in the French language in the province. After protests successfully lead to the repeal of Regulation 17, the situation for Franco-Ontarians slowly improved, notably the further C'est l'temps protests in the 1970s leading to the Ontario justice system becoming officially bilingual in 1984 and then the French Language Services Act in 1986.

One of the most significant mass movements in Franco-Ontarian history was the S.O.S. Montfort movement of the late 1990s and early 2000s, attempting to save Montfort Hospital, the only primarily francophone hospital in Ontario, after the Mike Harris government announced it would be shutting down the hospital in 1997. After widespread mass mobilization and court cases, the campaign was ultimately successful.

In February 2016, Premier Kathleen Wynne issued a formal apology for Regulation 17. Later that year, French Language Services Commissioner François Boileau called for the expansion of the French Language Services Act to cover the entire province and for provincial agencies to ensure that social media communications were made in both English and French. In 2017, the government announced that it would be creating a new French-language university in the province, the Université de l'Ontario français, responding to a decades-long campaign from the Franco-Ontarian community for a primarily francophone university in Ontario.

In the 2018 Ontario general election, the Progressive Conservative Party of Ontario, led by Doug Ford, won a majority in the election, capturing 76 of the 124 seats in the Legislative Assembly of Ontario and returning to government for the first time since 2003. Unlike Wynne, Ford was unilingual and could not speak French. There had also previously been questions raised about his ability as a leader to attract Franco-Ontarian voters and overcome the lingering distrust from the Harris leadership. The question had especially been raised after a gaffe during Ford's campaign for the Progressive Conservative leadership, when he responded to a journalist's question about learning French by saying that "it’d be important to be able to communicate with part of our country that speaks French — I love Quebec," seemingly ignoring the existence of the francophone community in Ontario. During his time as a city councillor in Toronto and in his mayoral run in 2014, Ford had also come under criticism for his actions towards the French language, having voted in favour of the abolition of the French Language Advisory Committee and having refused to respond to election questions from the Association des communautés francophones de l’Ontario à Toronto.

== Black Thursday ==
In June 2018, Ford unveiled his first cabinet, naming Caroline Mulroney as Minister of Francophone Affairs and demoting the Ministry of Francophone Affairs from full-fledged ministry down to an office. In July, the Ford government sent out a press release affirming its intention to promote the UOF, however, the government received some criticism after its initial Throne Speech failed to contain a single word in French or even a mention of the UOF. In mid-September, the university announced the first four bachelor's degree programmes it would offer.

On 23 October 2018, Mulroney met secretly with the rectors of the University of Ottawa, Laurentian University, and the president of the Collège Boréal. During the meeting, they discussed abandoning the Université de l'Ontario français and increasing funds for the three universities in its place. The rector of uOttawa, Jacques Frémont, had previously privately opposed the creation of l'UOF under the previous Liberal government.

On 15 November 2018, the government announced that, as a part of a number of budget cuts, the office of the French Language Services Commissioner and the soon-to-be-opened Université de l'Ontario français would both be eliminated in their entireties.

== Reactions ==
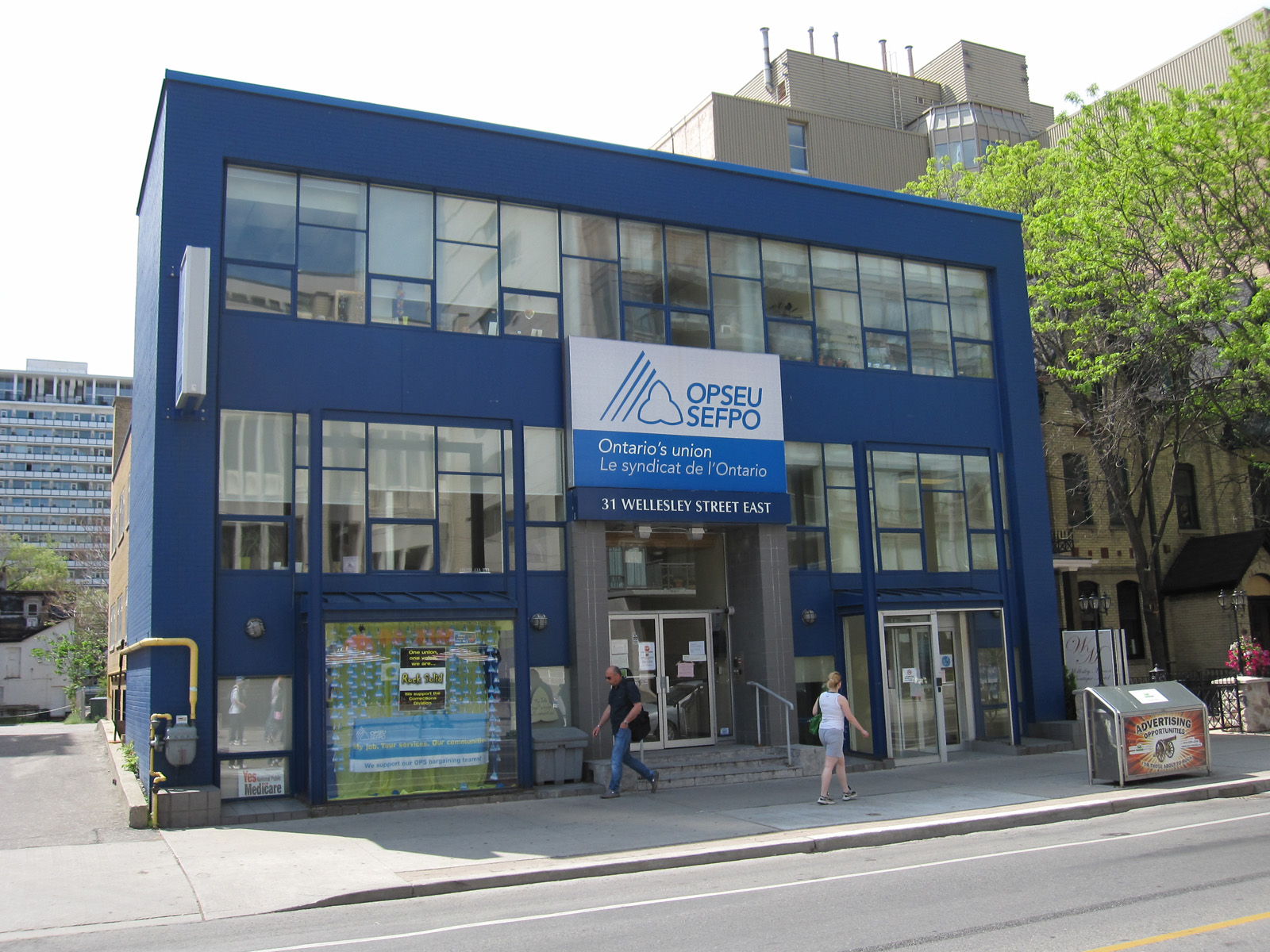
Canadian Union of Public Employees Headquarters

The cuts were met with immediate criticism, especially from the Franco-Ontarian community. The cuts were described by many as a Black Thursday for the Franco-Ontarian community and as part of Ford's austerity measures. The cuts were also described by some as an attempt to assimilate Franco-Ontarians into the anglophone majority and as a betrayal of fundamental rights in Canada. The Canadian Union of Public Employees called for university workers in Ontario to fight the cuts, stating that "the Ford government is using the disguise of fiscal restraint to try and pit communities against one another."

Some commentators argued that the cuts were counter-productive, noting that demand for primary and secondary school education in French in Ontario and across Canada was significantly increasing.

The outgoing French Language Services Commissioner, François Boileau, stated that he learned the position was being eliminated half an hour before the government's announcement and expressed concerns that the ombudsperson's office wouldn't have the same mandate to actively advocate for francophone rights in Ontario. Concerns were also raised about the impact the cuts would have on Northern Ontario, the region with the highest concentration of Franco-Ontarians. Some commentators accused Ford's government of being too Toronto-centric, arguing that the cuts demonstrated a lack of concern to issues affecting the rest of the province.

A small number of Franco-Ontarians defended the cuts, with former Progressive Conservative candidate Yvan Grenier stating that "as much as my emotions would lead me into wanting what all the other Franco-Ontarians want, I still have to be realistic. We are so low on money, we have to cut somewhere," and that he was concerned that the outcry over the cuts could lead to an anti-francophone backlash from anglophones.

Writing for the Institute for Research on Public Policy magazine, University of Amsterdam professor Mike Medeiros stated that from his analysis of polling data: "if francophobia is at play it is most likely a tacit, subtle form of it rather than an overt anti-francophone sentiment," and that "non-francophones are clearly unconvinced of the need to further promote bilingualism in Canada." Other commentators, however, pointed to struggles over bilingualism occurring in other provinces as indicative of a general rise of francophobia in Canada. David Weber, professor at Bishop's University, noted that francophone minority struggles often received significantly less coverage in Canadian media than even minor stories from the anglophone minority in Québec, stating that "to read leading English-Canadian media, you would think that only one of those [linguistic minority] communities — Québec’s anglophones — were under threat."

=== Reactions from Québec ===
The cuts received criticism from groups representing the anglophone minority in Québec, with Geoffrey Chambers, head of the Quebec Community Groups Network, stating that "it's bad for the overall climate of linguistic peace and growth of structures that makes linguistic peace more possible and achievable." The Montreal Gazette, the largest English-language newspaper in Québec, published an editorial calling for Anglo-Quebeckers to stand in solidarity with Franco-Ontarians, proclaiming that "to defend access to services for official-language minorities is to defend national unity and a vision of this country as a place where both languages can be at home."

Several commentators also raised comparisons between the Anglo-Quebecer and Franco-Ontarian minorities, noting that there were three entirely anglophone universities in Québec, namely Concordia University, McGill University, and Bishop's University, but none in Ontario as well as the fact that the Franco-Ontarian minority has historically suffered lower socio-economic conditions than the Anglo-Quebecer minority.

The newly elected government of Québec, led by Premier François Legault, expressed concerns over the cuts, with Legault raising the issue during the first official meeting between him and Ford. The Mayor of Montréal Valérie Plante denounced the cuts, with the Franco-Ontarian flag later being flown in front of Montreal city hall in solidarity.

=== Reactions from francophone minorities in Canada ===
Francophone minority communities elsewhere in Canada expressed solidarity with Franco-Ontarians over the cuts and expressed concerns over the implications the cuts could have for the status. In early December 2018, over 200 Franco-Manitobans held a solidarity demonstration in Winnipeg, raising the Franco-Ontarian flag over the Saint-Boniface town hotel. That same day, over 60 Fransaskois attended a solidarity protest in Regina, marching from Wascana Park to the Legislative Assembly of Saskatchewan. Denis Simard, president of the Assemblée communautaire fransaskoise stated that "we have long seen the progress of the Franco-Ontarian community as a model for the rest of the country, and when Franco-Ontarians rights roll back, we know that everyone's rights are rolling back." Further solidarity demonstrations were held in Moncton, New Brunswick, and in Alberta and British Columbia. Justin Johnson, vice-president of the Fédération des communautés francophones et acadienne du Canada stated that:

In this moment, both in Ontario and in New Brunswick, there are people who feel comfortable openly attacking bilingualism, people who think that francophonie is just a matter of economics, which is unacceptable. The fight in Ontario is our fight too. We're here and we will always be here!

In a press conference shortly after the cuts had been announced, Blaine Higgs, the Premier of New Brunswick stated that francophones in New Brunswick would not be facing similar cuts, however refused to criticise Ford's government.

=== Reactions from federal politicians ===
By the end of November 2018, the leaders of all five political parties represented in the federal House of Commons had met to voice support for federal intervention to save the UOF. Federal Conservative Party of Canada leader Andrew Scheer stated that he spoke to Ford about the cuts and had expressed concerns, but that "it's up to Mr. Ford to manage those types of things."

During the French-language leaders' debate for the 2019 Canadian federal election, Liberal Party of Canada leader Justin Trudeau attempted to link Ford's cuts to the federal Conservatives, declaring that "you’ll remember, like me, what Mr. Ford has done since he’s came to power. He’s cut services to Francophones even though he said he’s going to help that community. He said he was going to be ‘for the people,’ but he made cuts."

== La Résistance protests ==
The outcry quickly coalesced into a more organised protest movement that dubbed itself "la Résistance" and adopted the popular Franco-Ontarian slogan "Nous sommes, nous serons!" In the days shortly following the announcement, a number of Franco-Ontarians who had left phone messages to Ford's office received a call back from Ford himself. During the calls, Ford defended the cuts, stating that the province's budget didn't have enough money, and blamed the previous government of Kathleen Wynne for the deficit. However, those who had talked to the Premier reported feeling as if he knew little about the situation of Franco-Ontarians.

On 22 November, the Assemblée de la francophonie de l'Ontario held a press conference decrying the cuts, with AFO president Carol Jolin stating that "if I look at everything that has been done since the government took power, it is starting to look like an attack on francophones," and announcing that they had held a conference call with a number of lawyers to prepare a legal challenge against the government.

Nine days after Black Thursday, the Ford government began backtracking on the cuts, announcing that the French Language Services Commissioner would continue as an officer under the provincial ombudsperson's office, that the government would seek to turn the office of francophone affairs into a full-fledged ministry, and that the premier's office would hire a senior policy adviser on francophone affairs.

On 28 November, a heated debate was held in the Legislative Assembly of Ontario, with the opposition Ontario New Democratic Party putting forward a motion to reverse the government's cuts. During the debate, Glengarry—Prescott—Russell MPP and the only francophone member of Ford's caucus Amanda Simard made an impassioned speech in parliament asking the government to reverse the cuts, noting that she had attended the S.O.S. Montfort protests as a child and that "20 years later, we're still fighting to preserve the rights that we have gained." The next day, Simard announced she was leaving the Progressive Conservative Party to sit as an independent in protest over the cuts.

After Simard's defection, with rumours of more Progressive Conservative MPPs crossing the floor, the government announced that it would be introducing legislation to raise the threshold for a party to gain recognized party status in the Legislative Assembly from 8 MPPs to 12. While sitting as an independent, Simard was blocked from speaking in a parliamentary session in early December by Progressive Conservative MPPs after the Liberals had offered her one of their speaking slots to raise the matter of the cuts, as the switch required unanimous consent from the assembly.

On 1 December 2018, a day of protests against the cuts was held across the province, with over 14 000 demonstrators taking part. The scale of the demonstrations was one of the largest in the history of Ontario and the largest in Franco-Ontarian history, surpassing the S.O.S. Montfort protests two decades earlier. Some student groups, including the FESFO and RÉFO, had played a key role in organising the day's protests.

On 6 December 2018, Franco-Ontarian singer Mélissa Ouimet released a remake of her song Personne ne pourra m'arrêter, featuring a number of other French-Canadian singers, to promote the protests. The protests also saw a significantly increased Franco-Ontarian presence on social media, with some groups on Facebook reporting an almost sevenfold increase in group members in the month after the government's announcement.

In December, the federal Minister responsible for Official Languages Mélanie Joly announced that she had gotten in contact with Mulroney to indicate that the federal government was willing to step in and financially back the UOF. In early 2019, the Ford government announced that it would not be reappealing the law that created the UOF, but would not be financing the university either. Negotiations between the federal and provincial governments then picked up again in mid-2019. In September 2019, the governments of Ontario and Canada announced they had signed a memorandum of understanding, which would see both governments provide CA$126 million to fund the institution over the following eight years.

== Legacy ==
In June 2019, a delegation of Franco-Ontarians was invited to open the Fête nationale du Québec march in Montréal, the first time in history that a group from outside Québec had been invited to do so. In late 2019, Ford stated that he still intended to learn French and that he thought it would be “pretty easy” to pick up.

In January 2020, Kelly Burke was appointed French Language Services Commissioner. However, the press conference announcing her appointment stressed that the role of the commissioner was not to express positions on policy, sparking concerns that the role would not be able to effectively advocate for Franco-Ontarians. That same month, Simard announced that she was joining the Ontario Liberal Party. Ford reacted to the news by stating that he had no regrets about his party's treatment of Simard.

In September 2020, the Franco-Ontarian flag was designated an official emblem of Ontario. In March 2021, the Legislative Assembly unanimously passed a motion from Liberal Ottawa-Vanier MPP Lucille Collard to have the flag flown permanently in front of the Ontario Legislative Building.

Some commentators have argued that the mass movement failed to effectively connect with other groups that faced harm from the Ford government's cuts, blunting the ultimate long-term impact of the movement. Others have argued that the movement failed to effectively take into account the additional barriers faced by francophone ethnic minority groups in the province, further limiting the movement's impact.

=== COVID-19 pandemic ===
Concerns surrounding the Ford government's policies towards Franco-Ontarians surfaced again during the COVID-19 pandemic in Ontario, with the government initially not only holding press conferences entirely in English but also refusing to answer questions in French from Franco-Ontarian journalists. In mid-April 2020, Mulroney announced that, going forward, the government's press conferences would offer a French translation.

In July 2020, several anglophone schools in the province found themselves unable to offer French classes to students due to the re-opening restrictions imposed by the government.

=== French-language education in Ontario ===
Despite the magnitude of the protests, significant questions about the status of French-language post-secondary education in Ontario. Amidst the COVID-19 pandemic, l'Université de l'Ontario français reported significantly lower than expected applications for its opening year of studies and with rector André Roy resigning at the beginning of February 2021. Questions were raised surrounding the location of the university in a predominantly-anglophone city, a lack of advertising, and the limited nature of degree programmes offered. Later in 2021, Laurentian University was hit by a significant financial crisis, leading to cuts affected around 60% of the university's French-language programmes. The crisis not only led to a new wave of concern around the status of Franco-Ontarians in the province but also led to a new wave of criticism against the Ford government for its perceived inaction concerning the crisis.

== See also ==
- Premiership of Doug Ford
