= Francophone Association of Municipalities of Ontario =

Canadian political organization

Francophone Association of Municipalities of Ontario French: Association française des municipalités de l'Ontario
- Headquarters: Ottawa
- Official language: French, English
- General Manager: Jacqueline Noiseux
- Administrative assistant: Chantal Iouanga
- Website: afmo-on.ca

The Francophone Association of Municipalities of Ontario (or AFMO, from its French name, Association française des municipalités d'Ontario) is a Canadian political organization of municipalities in the province of Ontario which have significant Franco-Ontarian communities. The organization oversees the maintenance and development of municipal government services in French, and works with other levels of government, as well as organizations in other Canadian provinces, on issues unique to francophone and bilingual communities.

The organization was founded in 1989, after a group of francophone mayors and councillors attending the annual conference of the Association of Municipalities of Ontario met to discuss the need for collaboration on the special issues unique to francophone and bilingual communities. Founding members included Vanier mayor Gisèle Lalonde, Russell mayor Gaston Patenaude, Rockland mayor Jean-Marc Lalonde, Hawkesbury mayor Yves Drouin, and Rayside-Balfour mayor Lionel Lalonde.

In addition to the organization's 40 member municipalities, a number of other non-municipal organizations and individuals have associate member status, including one municipal government in Quebec. Associate membership is most commonly held by organizations such as school boards in bilingual areas, provincial government agencies or non-governmental organizations that serve the francophone community; in the case of some provincial government ministries, however, it is held on an individual basis by a senior civil servant who is directly responsible for the ministry's French language programs, rather than by the ministry as a whole.

== Member municipalities ==
- Alfred and Plantagenet
- Armstrong
- Blind River
- Casselman
- Champlain
- Chapleau
- Clarence-Rockland
- Cochrane
- Cornwall
- Dubreuilville
- Earlton
- East Ferris
- East Hawkesbury
- Elliot Lake
- Fauquier-Strickland
- French River
- Greater Sudbury
- Greenstone
- Hawkesbury
- Hearst
- Iroquois Falls
- Kapuskasing
- Kirkland Lake
- Lakeshore
- Larder Lake
- Mattawa
- Mattice-Val Côté
- McGarry
- Moonbeam
- The Nation
- North Stormont
- Opasatika
- Ottawa
- Prescott and Russell United Counties
- Russell Township
- St. Charles
- Smooth Rock Falls
- Temiskaming Shores
- Thunder Bay
- Timmins
- Toronto
- Val Rita-Harty
- Welland
- West Nipissing
- Windsor

The district social services boards of Algoma, Cochrane, Timiskaming and Sudbury-Manitoulin also have municipal member status.

The municipal government of Rouyn-Noranda, Quebec is also a member of the organization, but has associate member status since it is outside of Ontario.

== Associate members ==
- Alliance des Caisses populaires de l'Ontario
- Association of Municipal Managers, Clerks and Treasurers of Ontario
- Association of Municipalities of Ontario
- Attorney General of Ontario (coordinator of French-language services)
- Business Development Bank of Canada
- Canadian Wood Council
- La Cité collégiale
- Club Richelieu of Ottawa
- Collège Boréal
- Collège d'Alfred
- Conseil de la Coopération de l'Ontario
- Conseil scolaire catholique de district des Grandes-Rivières
- Conseil des écoles catholiques du Centre-Est
- Contact North
- Direction Ontario
- La fédération des aîné(e)s et des retraité(e)s francophones de l'Ontario
- Fédération des Caisses populaires de l'Ontario
- Franco-Ontarian Heritage Network
- Francophone Assembly of Ontario
- Katimavik
- Ministry of Heritage, Sport, Tourism and Culture Industries (deputy ministers for culture and tourism)
- Ministry of the Solicitor General (deputy ministers for public security and correctional services)
- Ministry of Natural Resources and Forestry (coordinator of French-language services)
- Montfort Hospital
- Northern College
- Northern Ontario School of Medicine
- Office of Francophone Affairs (deputy minister)
- Ontario Chamber of Commerce
- Ontario Good Roads Association
- Ontario Municipal Social Services Association
- Ontario Provincial Police
- Le Phénix
- Marie-Paule Poulin
- Regroupement des organismes du patrimoine franco-ontarien
- Réseau francophone de santé du Nord de l'Ontario
- Société de développement communautaire de Prescott-Russell
- Société de développement de Sudbury-Est et de Nipissing-Ouest
- Société de développement de la Claybelt
- Société de développement de Kirkland Lake et district
- Société de développement de Renfrew et district
- Société économique de l'Ontario
- South Nation Conservation Authority
- TFO
- Trillys Communications
- Union des cultivateurs franco-ontariens
- University of Ottawa Faculty of Social Sciences

== See also ==
- Association of Municipalities of Ontario
- Federation of Canadian Municipalities
- List of micro-regional organizations
- Joint Council of Municipalities
- List of francophone communities in Ontario
