= Almanda Walker-Marchand =

Canadian feminist

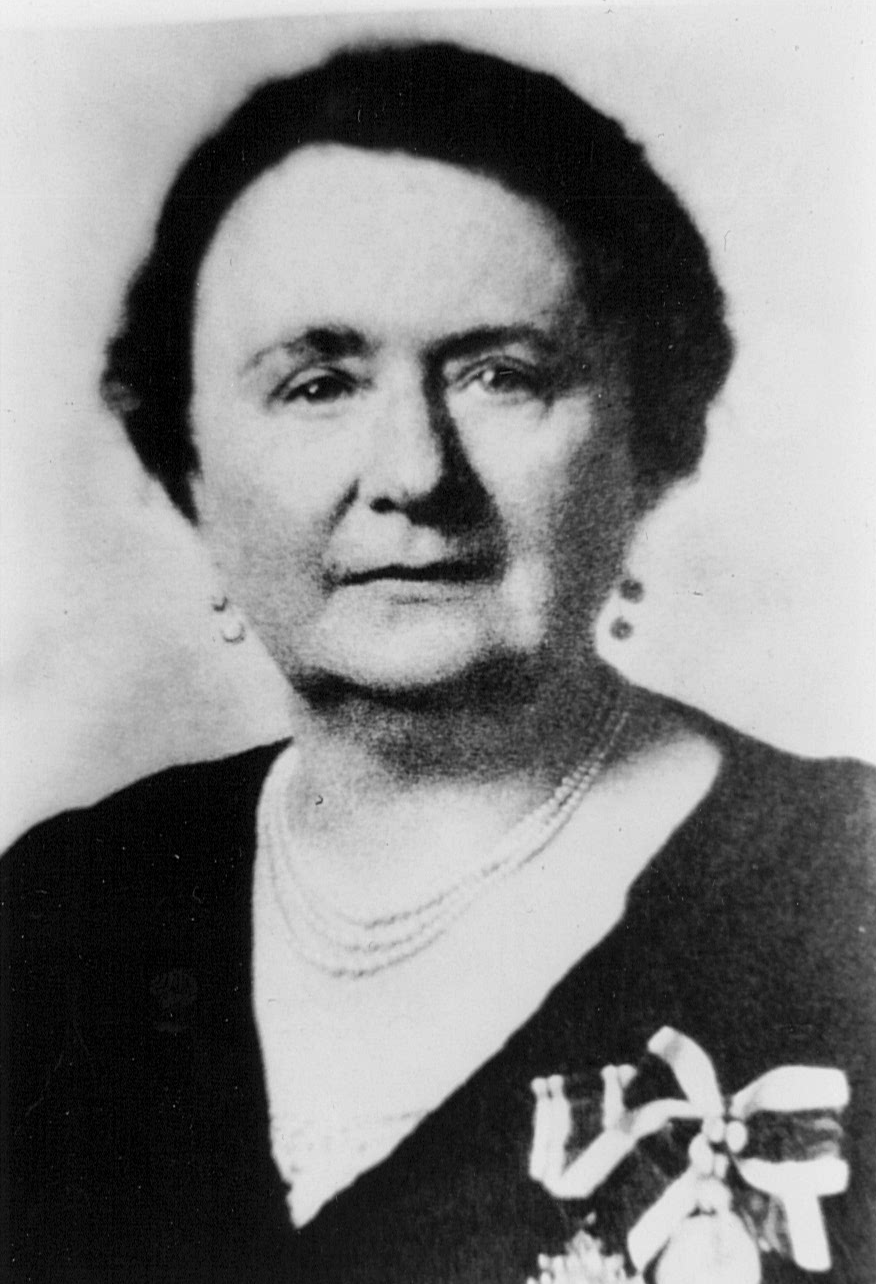
Almanda Walker-Marchand, founding president of the Fédération des femmes canadiennes-françaises (FFCF)

Almanda Walker-Marchand OBE (16 November 1868 – 4 January 1949) was a Canadian feminist and founder of the Fédération des femmes canadiennes-françaises.

== Biography ==
She was born in Québec City to a British father and a French-Canadian mother, she graduated from the Couvent Saint-Roch de Québec before moving to Ottawa in 1890, taking up residence in the Sandy Hill district. There, she would marry electrical engineer Paul-Eugène Marchand, having several children with him.

After the outbreak of World War I in 1914, she helped organise a group of over 400 French Canadian women with the goal of raising funds to help the Red Cross build a hospital ship to treat wounded soldiers. The group also organised the production of clothing for soldiers on the front, especially those facing harsh winter conditions. After the group was successful, they decided to continue operating as the Fédération des femmes canadiennes-françaises, the first secular French-language women's organisation in Canada outside of Québec. The Federation was headquartered in Ottawa. Walker-Marchand was the Federation's chair for 32 years, until her death in 1946.

Walker-Marchand was a major figure in the Franco-Ontarian fight against Regulation 17, which banned the use of the French language in schools in Ontario. She also gained recognition for her work promoting bilingual healthcare, fighting poverty, and in fighting for francophone women to be appointed to positions of leadership.

In 1943, she was named an officer of the Order of the British Empire. She died on 4 January 1949.

== Legacy ==
In 1990, a $1000 postsecondary education scholarship was created under her name by the Federation. In 1992, Lucie Brunet wrote a biography of her. In 2018, the Ontario Heritage Trust installed a plaque celebrating her in Strathcona Park, Ottawa.
