= University of Ontario =

University of Ontario may refer to:

- Ontario Tech University, officially the University of Ontario Institute of Technology
- Université de l'Ontario français (lit. "University of French Ontario")
- University of Western Ontario

== See also ==
- List of universities in Canada § Ontario
