= Nous Sommes, Nous Serons =

Franco-Ontarian slogan

Nous Sommes, Nous Serons ("We are, we will be") is a slogan often used by the Franco-Ontarian community in Canada. Signifying that the Franco-Ontarian community has long existed in Ontario, continues to exist, and will exist in the future, it has especially been used as a symbol of resistance against attempts to suppress the French language in Ontario.

The slogan dates back to 1969, when the Association canadienne-française d’éducation de l’Ontario proposed it as their new slogan for their new constitution. The ACFO's new constitution, however, was only officially adopted in 1972, at the organisation's general meeting at the Skyline Hotel in Ottawa, using the slogan as the meeting's theme.

The slogan then fell into disuse until the S.O.S. Montfort rallies in 1997. The slogan then became one of the most prominent symbols of the 2018 Franco-Ontarian Black Thursday protests.

In 2018, the slogan was adopted by the Assemblée de la francophonie de l’Ontario for the Franco-Ontarian coat of arms, appearing on the banner under the shield held up by two beavers containing the Franco-Ontarian flag as a boat symbolising the waves of immigration that helped build Francophone Ontario.
