= École secondaire Franco-Cité =

This can refer to:

- École secondaire catholique Franco-Cité- Public Catholic French high school in Ottawa, Ontario.
- École secondaire catholique Franco-Cité (Sturgeon Falls) - Public Catholic French high school in Sturgeon Falls, Ontario.
