= Pierre Ouellette (Canadian academic) =

Canadian academic

2nd President and vice-chancellor of Université de l'Ontario français
- In office 7 July 2021 – May 2024
- Preceded by: André Roy (Note: Denis Berthiaume and Édith Dumont served as interim presidents from Roy's departure in February 2021 to July 2021.)
- Succeeded by: Normand Labrie

Personal details
- Born: Harty, Ontario, Canada
- Occupation: Academic administration

Pierre Ouellette is a Canadian academic and broadcast executive, He was formerly president of the Université de l'Ontario français in Toronto from July 2021 to May 2024 and president of the Université de Hearst from 2011 until 2016, and was director of Radio-Canada's French-language Ontario unit from October 11, 2016 until 2021.

He is a native of Harty, Ontario and is a historian by training.

== Notes ==
Academic offices
Preceded by André Roy	President and vice-chancellor of Université de l'Ontario français 7 July 2021–May 2024	Incumbent
