= École secondaire de la Huronie =

School in Penetanguishene, Ontario, Canada (operated 1979–1980)

Location
- 63 Main Street; Penetanguishene, Ontario, L9M 2G3; Canada; 44.769722°N 79.934389°W

Information
- School type: Secondary school
- Principal: Jeannine Séguin
- Grades: 9–13
- Enrollment: 54 (1979–1980)
- Language: French
- Area: Penetanguishene, Ontario

École secondaire de la Huronie (ÉSH) was an extralegal secondary school which operated in Penetanguishene, Ontario, Canada during the 1979–1980 school year. The school is considered a symbol of the struggle of the preservation of Franco-Ontarian culture.

== Background ==
Between 1965 and 1979, francophone students of Penetanguishene were unable to pursue their studies fully in French. Francophone students were able to access French-language courses at the now-closed Penetanguishene Secondary School (PSS), but the French-language programming was considered inadequate and a "[foyer] d'assimilation" (centre for assimilation). While officially a bilingual school, PSS offered only French and History in French between its foundation in 1966 and 1976.

In 1976, an 18-year-old student of PSS, Denise Jaiko, denounced the institution's "bilinguisme de façade" and began a campaign to improve francophone learning conditions. In response, the Simcoe County School Board formed an internal and an external committee (le Conseil consultatif de langue française du Conseil scolaire de Simcoe et la Commission des langues d'enseignement du gouvernement) to evaluate the issue. The internal committee recommended the establishment of a francophone pavilion within PSS, and the external committee recommended the construction of a distinct francophone school. The school board did not act on these recommendations.

In 1979, the Ministry of Education set aside $2 million to fund a francophone school, but in June of that year, the school board declined to move forward, arguing that there were insufficient francophone students to support a unilingual francophone school. It likewise scrapped plans to move forward with building a francophone annex onto PSS.

== The operation of École secondaire de la Huronie ==
During the summer of 1979, the francophone community and the Association des enseignants franco-ontariens (AEFO) decided to open an illegal, "parallel" French-language secondary school in Penetanguishene. Jeannine Séguin, president of the Association canadienne-française de l'Ontario (ACFO; now known as Assemblée de la francophonie de l'Ontario or AFO), served as principal, and Hervé Caseault, president of AEFO, was vice-principal. The school was inaugurated on 3 September 1979. It served 54 students from Grades 9 to 13, and courses took place at the Centre des activités francophones, which itself was located in an old post office. Paul Tanguay noted that the school's name, École secondaire de la Huronie, named after the Huron people, evoked "un peuple menacé de génocide culturel" (a people threatened by cultural genocide).

The school was not financially supported by the government; its funds came from Franco-Ontarians and non-governmental organisations, including the ACFO, the AEFO, direction-Jeunesse, the Fédération des francophones hors Québec, the Fédération des femmes canadiennes-française, Théâtre-Action, and the Union des cultivateurs franco-ontariens (UCFO). The eight teachers at the school comprised monitors of the Centre des activités francophones and retired teachers who came from across Ontario, Quebec, and Acadia. They were unpaid, but received room and board. Transportation for students to go to and from school was organised by parent volunteers. The AEFO asked its members to donate some of their salary to support the school. There was also a campaign to encourage Franco-Ontarians to each donate "10 ¢ pour Penetang" to help finance the school. Jeannine Séguin, in her capacity as president of the ACFO, travelled to Montreal to ask the Quebecois Minister of Education at the time, Jacques-Yvan Morin, if the Lévesque government might consider financially aiding the school.

Students who attended the school were still able to obtain their diplomas by following a correspondence course in French offered by the Ministry of Education.

The unenrolment of francophone students had a financial impact on the Simcoe School Board, which receives funding based on enrolment.

The municipality of Penetanguishene unsuccessfully tried to pursue legal action to close the school based on the fact that a school was operating in a commercially zoned area. The town denied that this was for political reasons, stating that it was routine but had generated publicity because of the surrounding politics. The group Concerned Citizens for Bilingual Unity also campaigned to close the school, adopting the slogan "Go back to Quebec." Raymond Desrochers, the coordinator of ÉSH, denounced misinformation being spread about the ÉSH project, that enrolment in a permanent school would not exceed 100 students (when it was expected to be approximately 350) and that the cost of a permanent school would be approximately $4 million (when the Simcoe County Board of Education estimated the cost to be approximately $1.7 million).

In September 1979, Roy McMurtry, the Attorney General of Ontario, denied that the Penetanguishene Crisis was in response to a question of whether students would receive education in the French language, but was rather a question of whether or not they would share a building with anglophone students.

During the operation of ÉSH, activists continued advocating for French-language education. On October 6, 1979, the Congrès de l'Association canadienne-française de l'Ontario assembled 500 francophones to demand the resignation of the Minister of Education of Ontario Bette Stephenson. On October 9, the Comité consultatif de langue française de Simcoe collectively resigned and community members formed their own parallel, extralegal school board to oversee ÉSH. During the opening session of parliament on October 11, 1979, 16 ÉSH students held a protest wherein they removed their jackets to reveal that their shirts spelled, one letter at a time, "PENETANG."

On April 23, 1980, shortly after the Quebec independence referendum of May 20, 1980, the Ontario government allotted $500,000 for the establishment of a French-language secondary school at Penetanguishene. This project would become École secondaire Le Caron.

ÉSH ceased operations in June of 1980.

== Legacy ==
Micheline Marchand, a former student of ÉSH, stated that the establishment of francophone secondary schools in Penetanguishene slowed the assimilation of Franco-Ontarians into the majority anglophone culture.

René Lévesque, Premier of Quebec, used the Penetanguishene Crisis as an example of how Canadian federalism neglects liberty in order to support the position of Quebec separatism.

During the 1990s, a blue and white flag hung in the entryway of École secondaire Le Caron, with an inscription reading "Soyons ce que nous sommes. Ensemble, nous bâtirons." (Let us be what we are. Together, we build.), commemorating ÉSH.

In October 1989, the 10th anniversary of the ÉSH was celebrated. In 2005, celebrations marked the 25th anniversary of the operation of ÉSH. For the 40th anniversary of ÉSH, a permanent exposition, called "L'École de la résistance : dix sous, dix ans et une victoire pour l'Ontario français" was opened in the building the school occupied.

== See also ==
- Sturgeon Falls Education Crisis, a similar conflict in Sturgeon Falls in 1971
