= Battle of the Hatpins =

1916 protest in Ontario, Canada

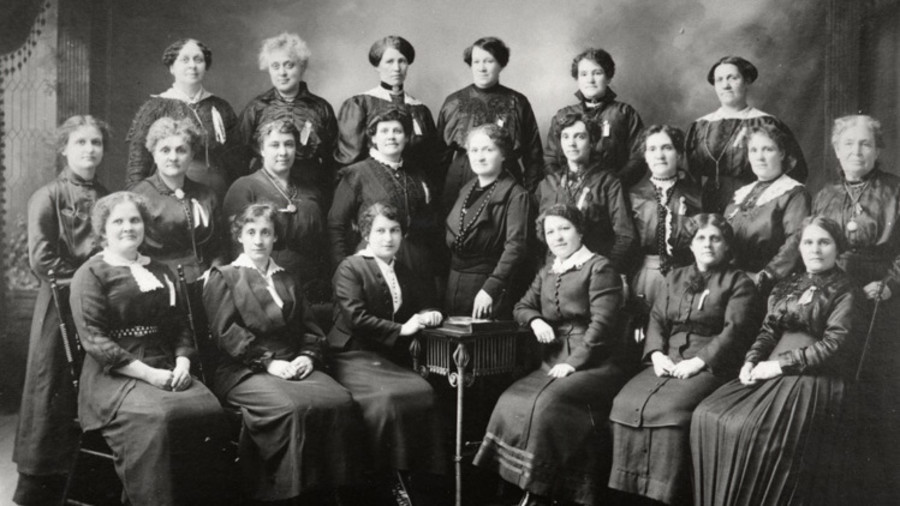
- The guardians of École Guigues in 1916, including the Desloges sisters
- Date: January 7, 1916
- Location: École Guigues, Ottawa, Ontario, Canada; 45°25′51″N 75°41′29″W
- Goals: French-language education; Repeal of Regulation 17
- Methods: Occupation and garrison of school

Parties
| Mothers of schoolchildren | Police |

Number
| 70 | 30 |

The Battle of the Hatpins (French: Bataille des épingles à chapeaux) was a 1916 protest that occurred in Ottawa, Ontario, Canada, over the effects of provincial Regulation 17. First passed in 1912 and more strictly enforced beginning in 1915–1916, the regulation restricted French-language education in the province of Ontario. More than 70 women used hatpins, frying pans and other common household objects to fight off 30 police officers intent on arresting two sisters, Béatrice and Diane Desloges, for teaching in French in an Ottawa school. The battle was part of a cultural resistance movement that led to bilingual education being officially reinstated in 1927. More than 100 years later the Ontario government apologized for Regulation 17.

== Background ==
The stated rationale for Regulation 17 was to ensure quality English-language instruction, but it was perceived as a xenophobic reaction to the arrival of a significant number of French speakers from neighbouring Quebec. The regulation angered Franco-Ontarians who wanted to have their children continue learning in their own language. Teachers in "écoles de la résistance" (literally "schools of the resistance") defied the government and continued to teach in French.

The battle developed at École Guigues of Ottawa, where the protests were led by sisters Béatrice and Diane Desloges. In October 1915, the school board replaced the pair with English-speaking teachers, and the Desloges instead began teaching secretly elsewhere in the community. The unsuitability of these spaces for instruction in winter prompted parents to invite the Desloges back to the school to teach in January 1916. The school was then ordered shut down by the provincial government.

== Battle of the Hatpins ==
When education officials, accompanied by police, arrived at the school to implement the shutdown order, they encountered 70 local women, mothers of children at the school, armed with hatpins and other household items who prevented their entrance. The Desloges sisters, dubbed the "Guardians of Guigues", instructed in French inside the school, disregarding an order forbidding them from entering the grounds. Franco-Ontarian newspaper Le Droit announced that "les demoiselles Desloges ont repris possession de leurs classes" (the Desloges ladies have retaken possession of their classes).

Three days later, 30 policemen with clubs forced open the door and were met by women who "fought back with rolling pins, cast-iron skillets and hatpins and drove the police officers away". The Ottawa Journal reported that "one officer had his eye blacked and another his thumb chewed" and a lawyer representing the government was "pelted with ice". The sisters, meanwhile, "were quietly spirited into their classrooms through a side window". Parents armed with makeshift weapons guarded the school for several weeks. Protest marches were held objecting to the law.

== Legacy ==
This protest is said to have "inspired people across Ontario to fight for French-language education". Canadian archivist Michel Prévost suggested that this protest was produced by "a movement dominated by women" which was rare given their marginalization at the time, as well as "part of a constant struggle for recognition faced by Ottawa's Francophones". As a result of the Battle of the Hatpins, the government abandoned efforts to prevent French-language teaching at Guigues. Bilingual schooling in Ontario was officially reinstated in 1927. On 22 February 2016, the Ontario government issued an official apology for its actions against French-language education. France Gélinas put forward a private member's bill in the provincial legislature to officially proclaim 29 January as "Battle of the Hatpins Day".

== See also ==
- List of incidents of civil unrest in Canada
