= Gisèle Lalonde =

Canadian politician (1933–2022)

Gisèle Lalonde CM OOnt

Mayor of Vanier, Ontario
- In office 1985–1991
- Preceded by: Bernard Grandmaître
- Succeeded by: Guy Cousineau

Personal details
- Born: June 28, 1933 Eastview, Ontario
- Died: July 2022 (aged 89)
- Party: Progressive Conservative Party of Ontario

Gisèle Lalonde, CM OOnt (née Deschamps; June 28, 1933 – July 26 or 27, 2022) was a Canadian politician and community activist, who served as the mayor of Vanier, Ontario from 1985 to 1991.

== Biography ==
She was born in Eastview (later renamed Vanier in 1969). She received a teaching certificate from the University of Ottawa and taught in the Ottawa area from 1951 to 1973. During that time, she was also a member of the French Separate School Board for 13 years. She acted as an advisor on the subject of francophone education to Ministry of Education in Ontario and also chaired a council which advised Premier of Ontario on francophone matters. She ran for the Progressive Conservative Party of Ontario in the 1977 Ontario general election in the riding of Ottawa East, losing to Liberal Albert Roy.

She married Gilles Lalonde.

She was elected mayor of Vanier in 1985. In 1988, she founded and was the first president of the Francophone Association of Municipalities of Ontario.

She was a key leader in the S.O.S. Montfort campaign which prevented the closing of the Montfort Hospital, the largest francophone hospital in Ontario.

She was also part of the Scout District d'Ottawa (Association Scout du Canada) for five years as of 2006. She also wrote an autobiography.

She was made a Member of the Order of Canada in 2003 and the Order of Ontario in 2006.

A school, L'école secondaire publique Gisèle Lalonde in Orleans, Ontario, is named in her honour.
