= S.O.S. Montfort =

Franco-Ontarian movement that fought to save Montfort Hospital

SOS Montfort
- Date: 1997-2002
- Participants: Montfort Hospital; Franco-Ontarian community; Gisèle Lalonde; Mike Harris-led Government of Ontario
- Outcome: Successful overturning of the government's decision to close Montfort Hospital

S.O.S. Montfort was a Franco-Ontarian movement that fought to save Montfort Hospital, the only primarily francophone hospital in Ontario, after the Mike Harris government announced it would be shutting down the hospital in 1997. One of the largest mass movements in Franco-Ontarian history, the level of mobilisation it saw and the ultimate success of the campaign has been noted as a significant moment in the struggle for French-language rights in Ontario and in the wider Canada.

== Background ==
The francophone communities in Ontario have historically faced oppression from the anglophone majority, notably the Regulation 17, which outlawed education in the French language in the province. After protests successfully lead to the repeal of Regulation 17, the situation for Franco-Ontarians slowly improved, notably the further C'est l'temps protests in the 1970s leading to the Ontario justice system becoming officially bilingual in 1984 and then the French Language Services Act in 1986.

Tensions between the anglophone and francophone communities, however, continued into the 1990s, marked by incidents such as the Sault Ste. Marie language resolution, which was eventually struck down by a court ruling in 1994. Tensions were also reaching a peak in the neighbouring province of Québec, with the 1995 Québec referendum producing only a very thin majority against the independence of Québec.

The 1995 Ontario general election saw a new government take power in Ontario, with the Progressive Conservative Party winning a majority under its leader Mike Harris. A major tenet of the Harris government's policies was the so-called Common Sense Revolution, a neoliberal programme aiming to reduce taxes, reduce the role of government, and reduce the number of people on social assistance. The programme drew comparisons to the policies of former British Prime Minister Margaret Thatcher and former American president Ronald Reagan.

The Montfort Hospital was founded in 1953, originally managed by the Daughters of Wisdom, a Catholic order, until it became non-denominational and public in 1970. Over the following years, the hospital saw a number of expansions, including the Montfort Long-Term Care Centre in 1978, and the opening of the South Wing (housing the emergency department, the surgical unit, and a new nursing care unit) as well an affiliation agreement for French-language medical education with the University of Ottawa in 1992. In November 1989, the hospital was designated under the French Language Services Act.

== Initial campaign ==
In 1996, the Harris government formed the Ontario Health Services Restructuring Commission as part of its Common Sense Revolution programme. The Commission was charged with restructuring healthcare across the province, including forcing hospitals to amalgamate or transfer programmes. On 24 February 1997, the Commission announced that it would be shutting down Montfort Hospital, despite Montfort being the only primarily francophone hospital in Ontario and despite the hospital having been named the most effective hospital in the province only a few weeks earlier.

Opposition to the government's move spread quickly, with a committee being officially formed only two days later to fight the decision. With the Franco-Ontarian flag flying at half-mast, a press conference was held to announce that the campaign was to be called S.O.S. Montfort. Former mayor of Vanier Gisèle Lalonde was named chair of the campaign.

Although some originally feared an exodus of staff from the hospital, with some staff having been offered positions elsewhere in the province, the only doctor who quit the hospital was one who had already been planning to leave for several months previously, the rest choosing to stay and fight the closure of their hospital. On 5 March, staff at the other in Ottawa held a protest in solidarity with Montfort.

On 20 March 1997, over 2000 local high school and Collège La Cité students held a demonstration, marching to Montfort and linking arms to form a human chain around the hospital.

On 22 March 1997, a large demonstration was held at TD Place Arena (then known as the Ottawa Civic Centre), with over 10 000 Franco-Ontarians marching in protest and leading chants of "Montfort fermé, jamais!". Montfort Hospital Foundation president Jacques Blouin led the organisation of buses to transport protestors to Ottawa from around the province, bringing in additional thousands to the protest. It was widely reported as the largest protest in Franco-Ontarian history since the protests against Regulation 17 and one of the single largest protests in the history of Ontario. At the protest, a number of speeches were held, with Lalonde stating that: "We have to shout without fear and without hesitation that they cannot touch Montfort. All of Canada has its eyes on us. Today, Canadians are seeing a nation rising up!"

As well as the rally being broadcast live by Radio-Canada, Franco-Ontarian newspaper Le Droit additionally thrown its support behind the movement, repurposing its slogan of "L'avenir est à ceux qui luttent" ("the future belongs to those who fight for it") for the campaign. The day after the 22 March rally, it published a rare Sunday edition dedicated to the campaign, with journalist Denis Gratton proclaiming that "The Franco-Ontarian community will never allow Montfort Hospital, our hospital, to be closed!"

A week later, the Health Services Restructuring Commission announced that it would be postponing its final decision on closing Montfort.

The S.O.S. Montfort movement continued to grow, launching a petition calling for the hospital to not only remain open but to have its mandate strengthened. The petition gathered over 130 000 signatures before being presented to the Legislative Assembly of Ontario in early June 1997. Later that month, the leaders of SOS Montfort and the hospital staff gathered to each lay a brick to build a "counter-monument" at the hospital's entrance, aiming to remind the government that the hospital was more than just a pile of bricks. In 1998, the laneway linking Montréal Road to the hospital was renamed Avenue du 22 mars (March 22 Avenue) to mark the movement.

By mid-August 1997, the Commission announced that it would be partially reversing its decision, allowing the hospital to stay open with its own administration, but with a greatly reduced level of services. The Commission's new plan would've seen the hospital lose over a hundred beds and restrict its services to old-age care and urgent care. Negotiations then continued between the government, the campaign, and the hospital management, but soon reached an impasse.

=== Federal and provincial reactions ===
Reactions from the opposition parties in the Ontario Parliament swiftly came to oppose the Harris government. In the nine times the Parliament met between 25 February and 2 April 1997, opposition MPPs raised the issue of Montfort eighteen times. The day after the Commission's announcement, a number of Liberal MPPs, including Jean-Marc Lalonde, Dalton McGuinty, Bernard Grandmaître, Gilles Morin, and Richard Patten, announced that they were working on a plan to defeat the cuts. Former NDP Ontario Premier Bob Rae also announced his support for the cause and NDP MPP for Timmins Gilles Bisson was one of the guest speakers at the 22 March rally.

Despite healthcare being provincial jurisdiction, a number of federal MPs, notably Ottawa-Vanier representative Mauril Bélanger, spoke up in favour of the movement.

Despite some historical tensions between the Franco-Ontarian community and the Québécois community, the government of Québec announced its support for S.O.S. Montfort, with Premier Lucien Bouchard holding an official meeting with Mike Harris over the issue and Québec Minister of Finance Bernard Landry announcing funds to support the campaign. Several organisations and unions in Québec also lent their support to the movement, such as the Saint-Jean-Baptiste Society, the Fédération des travailleurs et travailleuses du Québec, and the Confédération des syndicats nationaux. By the end, around 35% of the total funding of the SOS Montfort campaign came from Québec.

== Court campaign ==
In 1998, the SOS Montfort Fund campaign was launched, ultimately raising enough funds for SOS Montfort to take the Harris government to court to save the hospital. A main argument of the campaign was that the decision to shutter the francophone hospital in Ontario was a potential violation of Franco-Ontarians' rights under Section 15 of the Canadian Charter of Rights and Freedoms. Lawyer Ronald Caza was hired to lead the movement's fight in the courts.

On 29 November 1999, the Ontario Divisional Court ruled in favour of Montfort and against the government. The court's decision noted that the hospital helped defend the minority francophone community from assimilation and helped protect their constitutional rights.

However, the Harris government quickly chose to appeal the ruling, with Government House Leader Norm Sterling stating that "This particular appeal is not about francophone rights or hospital rights, "It's about the role of legislatures and the role of our courts, as to who's going to decide public policy."

In May 2001, the Ontario Court of Appeal heard the government's appeal. Roy McMurtry, the Chief Justice of Ontario, accepted a request from the national French-language public broadcaster Radio-Canada to broadcast the proceedings of the case live, recognising the importance of the case to the Franco-Ontarian community.

In late 2001, the Court of Appeal announced its decision, unanimously confirming the ruling of the division court and once again ruling in favour of Montfort, stating that "the principle of respect for and protection of minorities is a fundamental structural feature of the Canadian Constitution" and that the Health Services Restructuring Commission failed to respect the French Language Services Act.

In February 2002, the Harris government announced that it would not appeal the decision to the Supreme Court of Canada. This marked the end of the government's attempts to close the hospital and the ultimate success of the movement. Montfort Hospital was saved and would remain open.

== Legacy ==
The success of the S.O.S. Montfort movement has helped inspire several other French-language rights battles elsewhere in Canada. In 2009, the hospital lent its support to the Committee for Equality of Health in French, fighting against healthcare reforms in New Brunswick that would've seen the elimination of the only health authority working legally in French.

In October 2003, Michel Gratton released a book titled Montfort, la lutte d'un peuple, chronicling the events of S.O.S. Montfort.

In 2009, a mural commemorating the movement was unveiled in Vanier, near the intersection of the Vanier Parkway and McArthur Avenue. In 2017, it was announced that the mural was due to be removed and refurbished. However, after a fundraising campaign by the Muséoparc Vanier failed, the future of the mural was put in doubt.

In 2010, a La Francophonie Monument was unveiled on the hospital grounds, including one of the largest Franco-Ontarian flag poles in the province. In 2012, the 15th anniversary of the campaign, mayor of Ottawa Jim Watson proclaimed the 22 March as Franco-Ontarian Solidarity Day. In 2015, the counter-monument that had been built during the protests was giving a permanent location near the main entrance to the hospital.

In January 2021, amid the COVID-19 pandemic, it was announced that Mike Harris would be among that year's recipients of the Order of Ontario. The nomination garnered significant opposition, in part from the Franco-Ontarian community and in part focused on the impact he had on healthcare in Ontario.

=== Honours ===
In 2003, Gisèle Lalonde was made a Member of the Order of Canada. In 2016, Ronald Caza was honoured by the Law Society of Ontario for his defences of francophone minorities in Canada, notably his role in S.O.S. Montfort.

In 2004, Montfort Hospital announced the creation of the March 22 Medal, named after the SOS Montfort campaign, to be awarded to individuals or groups who represent the pride, tenacity and determination that constitute three qualities essential to the success of Montfort.

=== 20th anniversary commemorations ===
In March 2017, a series of events was held to commemorate the 20th anniversary of the launch of the campaign, including a concert featuring several Franco-Ontarian artists held at TD Place Stadium. A speech by Ottawa mayor Jim Watson, however, was interrupted by chants from the crowd criticising him for his refusal to make the city officially bilingual.

As part of the events, a reenactement of the student march and humain chain protest was held, with hundreds students from La Cité, the Conseil des écoles catholiques du Centre-Est, and the Conseil des écoles publiques de l'Est de l'Ontario, marching from La Cité to the hospital. A panel moderated by Franco-Ontarian comedy group Improtéine was held at the Collège catholique Samuel-Genest prior to march.

=== Montfort expansion ===
In 2005, the government of Ontario, led by Premier Dalton McGuinty, announced a major expansion of the hospital, with plans to more than double its size by 2008, from 300 000 square feet to 750 000 square feet. In 2013, Montfort was officially designated a teaching hospital by the government of Ontario, with the number of teaching days at the Hospital having grown from around 6500 to nearly 21 000 since 2003.

In 2009, the federal government announced that it would be opening a healthcare clinic for the Canadian Armed Forces at the hospital.

In August 2019, the government of Ontario announced $75-million dollars for the construction of a bilingual health hub in Orléans, to be led by Montfort Hospital. At the announcement, Minister of Health Christine Elliott stated that "We recognize the incredible value that Montfort and other hospitals provide."

=== 2018 Black Thursday ===
Despite the success of the campaign, the question of French-language rights in Ontario remains a significant concern in the province. In 2018, after the return of the Progressive Conservative Party to government in Ontario, led by Doug Ford, another movement of Franco-Ontarian protests was formed after the Black Thursday of the 15 November, where the Ford government announced major cuts to Franco-Ontarian services, including the elimination of funding for the Université de l'Ontario français and the elimination of the French Language Services Commissioner. The protests were the largest Franco-Ontarian protests since S.O.S. Monfort. When Progressive Conservative MPP Amanda Simard quit the party over the cuts, she noted that she had participated in SOS Montfort as a child, and that "now, 20 years later, we're still fighting to preserve the rights that we have gained."
