= Association of Municipalities of Ontario =

- Abbreviation: AMO
- Formation: 1899
- Type: Organizations based in Ontario
- Legal status: active
- Purpose: AMO works to make municipal governments stronger and more effective. Through AMO, Ontario's 444 municipalities work together to achieve shared goals & meet common challenges
- Headquarters: Toronto, Ontario, Canada
- Region served: Canada
- Official language: English, French
- Staff: 40
- Website: www.amo.on.ca

The Association of Municipalities of Ontario (AMO) is a non-profit organization representing municipal and regional governments in the Canadian province of Ontario. It was created on June 22, 1972 through a merger of the Ontario Municipal Association and the Ontario Association of Mayors and Reeves. The AMO was restructured in 1982, and was formally incorporated in 1990.

Every municipality in Ontario is eligible to become a municipal member of the AMO.

== History ==
The first meeting of an enduring municipal association was held in Hamilton on September 6, 1899. The name "Ontario Municipal Association" was chosen, and it was agreed that there would be annual meetings, or "oftener if need be, upon the call of the executive committee", so that both appointed and elected representatives of municipalities could discuss common concerns. A constitution for the organization was drawn up, officers elected and the mandate decided ‑ to establish regular meetings between the association and the government to speak to, and to influence legislation.

The Association of Municipalities of Ontario was created through the merger and reconstitution of the Ontario Municipal Association and the Ontario Association of Mayors and Reeves on June 22, 1972. Further organizational change continued to be discussed in the late 1970s when exploratory meetings were held between AMO and two other major municipal organizations which also existed at that time: The Rural Ontario Municipal Association and The Association of Counties and Regions. Discussions were also held with affiliated associations: The Organization of Small Urban Municipalities (OSUM), The Association of District Municipalities, The Federation of Northern Ontario Municipalities (FONOM), and The Northwestern Ontario Municipal Association (NOMA).

In February 1980, an Association Review Committee was struck and presented its report in June 1980. A new association of municipal representatives was proposed, consisting of five sections, "restructured to ensure accurate representation of the positions of the different types of municipalities in the province". The newly constituted Association of Municipalities of Ontario came into being on January 1, 1982. In May 1990 AMO became formally incorporated without share capital. AMO's constitution was re‑formulated into governing By‑law No. 1. The By‑law has been amended a number of times to implement significant changes to the Association.

== Mandate ==
The mandate of the organization is to support and enhance strong and effective municipal government in Ontario. It promotes the value of the municipal level of government as a vital and essential component of Ontario and Canada's political system.

The Mandate is delivered in a variety of ways. Of particular importance is the Memorandum of Understanding (MOU) between AMO and the Province. The MOU provides the opportunity for municipal input and reaction to provincial policy ideas (pre-consultation) so that they are fully informed as part of any provincial policy making process. The MOU also includes a Protocol that obligates the Province to consult with AMO and municipalities on matters that are of a federal-provincial nature that could affect municipal services and finances. The Protocol also sets out the Province's commitment to pursue a federal-provincial-municipal framework where municipalities have a 'seat at the federal-provincial table.'"

== Activities ==
The activities of AMO support both its Mandate and Vision Statement. AMO develops policy positions and reports on issues of general interest to municipal governments; conducts ongoing liaison with provincial government elected and non-elected representatives; informs and educates governments, the media and the public on municipal issues; markets innovative and beneficial services to the municipal sector; and maintains a resource centre on issues of municipal interest. The Association's Annual Meeting is held in August and is combined with a comprehensive conference program.

AMO also selects three young people every year to serve as Youth Fellows, who "learn more about municipal governance and policy while gaining exposure to real-time issues facing Ontario’s municipalities." In 2020, the Youth Fellows were Raghed Al-Areibi, Emilie Leneveu, and Graham Taylor. In 2022, the Youth Fellows were Juvairiyya Hanslod, Terran Morris, and Hale Mahon. In 2023, the Youth Fellows were Jacob Anderson, Morgan Carl, and Catherine Dong. In 2024, the Youth Fellows were Elizabeth Simpson Hillis, Henry Khamonde, and Thomas Walling. In 2025, the Youth Fellows were Ida Mensah, Kerry Yang, and Nathan Bean The 2026 Youth Fellows are Allan Buri, Akbar Imran and Rebecca Bekele.

== Organizational structure ==
The governing body of the Association is the Board of Directors, elected every two years at the Association's Annual Meeting. The Board comprise 43 elected and non-elected municipal representatives which meets five times per year. An Executive Committee of the Board, responsible for the business of the Association between Board of Director meetings, meets monthly.

== See also ==
- List of micro-regional organizations
- Federation of Canadian Municipalities
- Francophone Association of Municipalities of Ontario
