= Mélissa Ouimet =

Mélissa Ouimet is a Franco-Ontarian singer and songwriter.

== Career ==
After graduating from the Collège Lionel-Groulx with a degree in music, Ouimet joined the musical groups The Soldouts in 2007 to tour through east Asia, playing in hotel bars in cities such as Hong Kong, Seoul, and Kuala Lumpur. In 2008, before the group travelled onwards to the Middle East, she left the group, citing homesickness and a desire to launch a solo career.

In 2015, she auditioned for La Voix, but failed to get past the blind auditions.

In March 2016, she was signed to Disques Musicor. Later that year, she released her first album, Personne ne pourra m’arrêter (No One Can Stop Me).

In April 2018, she released an EP, titled Amours jetables.

On 6 December 2018, she released a remake of her song Personne ne pourra m'arrêter, featuring a number of other French-Canadian singers, to promote the 2018 Franco-Ontarian Black Thursday protests.

In February 2019, she returned to La Voix, covering Like The Way I Do by Melissa Etheridge. Later that year, she won an award at the 2019 Gala Trille Or.

In 2020, the Association canadienne-française de l'Ontario named her to the Ordre de la francophonie de Prescott et Russell.

In early 2021, she released a new single and announced plans to release an EP in October that year. In May 2021, she was among over 100 musicians that signed an open letter to Nathalie Roy, the Québec Minister of Culture and Communications, calling for increased funding for arts.

== Personal life ==
Ouimet is from St. Albert, Ontario, daughter of Réjean Ouimet and Claudette Lafontaine; he has served as general manager of the Fromagerie St-Albert. She graduated with a bachelor's in arts from the University of Ottawa in 2013.
