= École secondaire catholique Franco-Cité (Sturgeon Falls) =

Location
- 90 Main Street; Sturgeon Falls, Ontario, P2B 2Z7; Canada
- Coordinates: 46.3721°N 79.9279°W

Information
- Principal: René Dubuc
- Grades: 9 to 12
- Language: French
- Colours: Orange; Black
- Team name: Patriotes
- Website: www.francocite.ca

Situated in Sturgeon Falls, Ontario. L'École secondaire catholique Franco-Cité is one of the first high schools to have fought for French rights in Ontario.

== History ==
1970 was an important year for the establishment of the first French secondary school in Sturgeon Falls. After the Ontario government approved the creation of French secondary schools in 1968, Strugeon Falls, being a primarily French town with 80% of the population identifying as Francophone, sought to have a French secondary school. The beginning of the fight for French rights of secondary students in Sturgeon Falls began in March, one of the most important months debuting the creation of Franco-cité. On March 2, a petition with 2277 signatures of parents and French-Ontarian students was presented. However, members of the school board refused to acknowledge the importance of a French secondary school in West-Nipissing. Of the school board's 17 members, only three were Francophone. After the refusal of the petition on March 23, 500 French students from the region refused to enroll in a secondary institution in Sturgeon falls, the only one being taught in English. Another meeting was held on March 25, at which director M. Monkman and the superintendent met with representatives to discuss the matter.

April 7, 1970, teachers and primary/secondary students stood their ground and devised a strike. During the month of April there are various meetings and l'Association d'Éducation de l'Ouest Nipissing (AEON) is created. AEON argues that the secondary school in Sturgeon Falls is preventing francophone students from expressing their cultural identity and is harming the expansion of the french language. They accept the proposition to try and have a school of mixed language; One side taught in French and the other in English. Also, this school would be under one administration only. However, discord between the French and English students becomes evident and soon the conflict spread to Faculty, parents and the administration. The conflict diffuses throughout the community of sturgeon falls and the surrounding area.

In 1971, french students form " le Comité d'action étudiante " in the battle against having a school taught in their language. To inform the francophone community about developments concerning the secondary school, 2 journals Le Journal and Coup d'oeil are created.

== Notable students ==
- Richard Deschatelets - Olympics 1976 wrestling & on Olympic committee.
- France Gareau - Gareau competed for Canada in the 1984 Summer Olympics held in Los Angeles, United States in the 100 metres and the 4 x 100 metres relay, where she anchored Canada to the silver medal (as a 17-year-old) with her teammates Angela Bailey, Marita Payne and Angella Taylor-Issajenko. Gareau also won relay medals at the 1990 Commonwealth Games, 1993 Summer Universiade and at two Francophone Games. Gareau was also Canadian champion at the 100 metres in 1989.

== See also ==
- Education in Ontario
- École secondaire catholique Franco-Cité - similarly named school in Ottawa.
- Sturgeon Falls Education Crisis
- List of secondary schools in Ontario
