= École secondaire Le Caron =

Location
- 22 John Street; Penetanguishene, Ontario, L9M 1N8; Canada; 44.76098°N 79.93985°W

Information
- School type: High school
- Founded: August 30, 1979
- School board: Conseil scolaire Viamonde
- School number: 934852
- Principal: Serge Lespérance
- Grades: 7–12
- Enrolment: 150 (October 2013)
- Language: French
- Website: lecaron.csviamonde.ca

École secondaire Le Caron is the only French-language high school located in Penetanguishene, Ontario, Canada. It serves the French population of Simcoe County, and it is managed by Conseil scolaire Viamonde.

== Early history ==
Between 1965 and the establishment of École secondaire Le Caron, francophone students of Penetanguishene were unable to pursue their students fully in French. In 1976, a student, Denise Jaiko, of the now-closed Penetanguishene Secondary School (PSS) began a campaign to improve francophone learning conditions. In response, the Simcoe County School Board formed an internal and an external committee to evaluate the issue. The internal committee recommended the establishment of a francophone pavilion within PSS, and the external committee recommended the construction of a distinct francophone school. The school board did not act on these recommendations.

In September 1979, a few months before the referendum on sovereignty in Quebec, French speakers in the Penetanguishene region opened the École secondaire de la Huronie, a parallel and illegal school. This "school of resistance" included 56 students from Grades 9 to 13. This school only existed for one year, but became the symbol of the struggle for Franco-Ontarian culture.

The dispute culminated in a legal battle that ended in two stages. First, in 1980, when an agreement between the province and the school board led to a school. On April 23, 1980, the Ontario government allotted $500,000 for a French-language school in Penetanguishene, and Le Caron was built between 1980 and 1981 and opened on April 23, 1982. Second, in July 1986, the Ontario Superior Court ruled in favor of Jacques Marchand in his 1984 lawsuit against the province and the school board, culminating in the Sirois judgment. In this lawsuit, Marchand, a father to two children attending Le Caron, demanded educational services for francophone children equivalent to those offered in English. The ruling forced Ontario to invest $5.7 million to expand the Le Caron School. After the expansion, Le Caron was inaugurated for a second time on April 24, 1990.

== Recent history ==
Over the years the school has moved from its original building on Main Street to 22 John Street, where it currently resides. The school participates in local French events and charities.

In 2005, the 25th anniversary of Le Caron was celebrated.

As of 2010, Le Caron comprised approximately 250 students.

== Extracurricular ==
In 2017 and 2018, Le Caron competed at OFSAA for Girls Badminton Doubles. In 2018, the Senior Girls Volleyball team won the SCAA championships.

== Notable alumni ==
- Damien Robitaille, Franco-Ontarian musician

== See also ==
- Education in Ontario
- List of secondary schools in Ontario
