= Montfort Hospital =

Francophone hospital in Ottawa, Ontario, Canada

Coordinates: 45.445599°N 75.639120°W

Hôpital Montfort
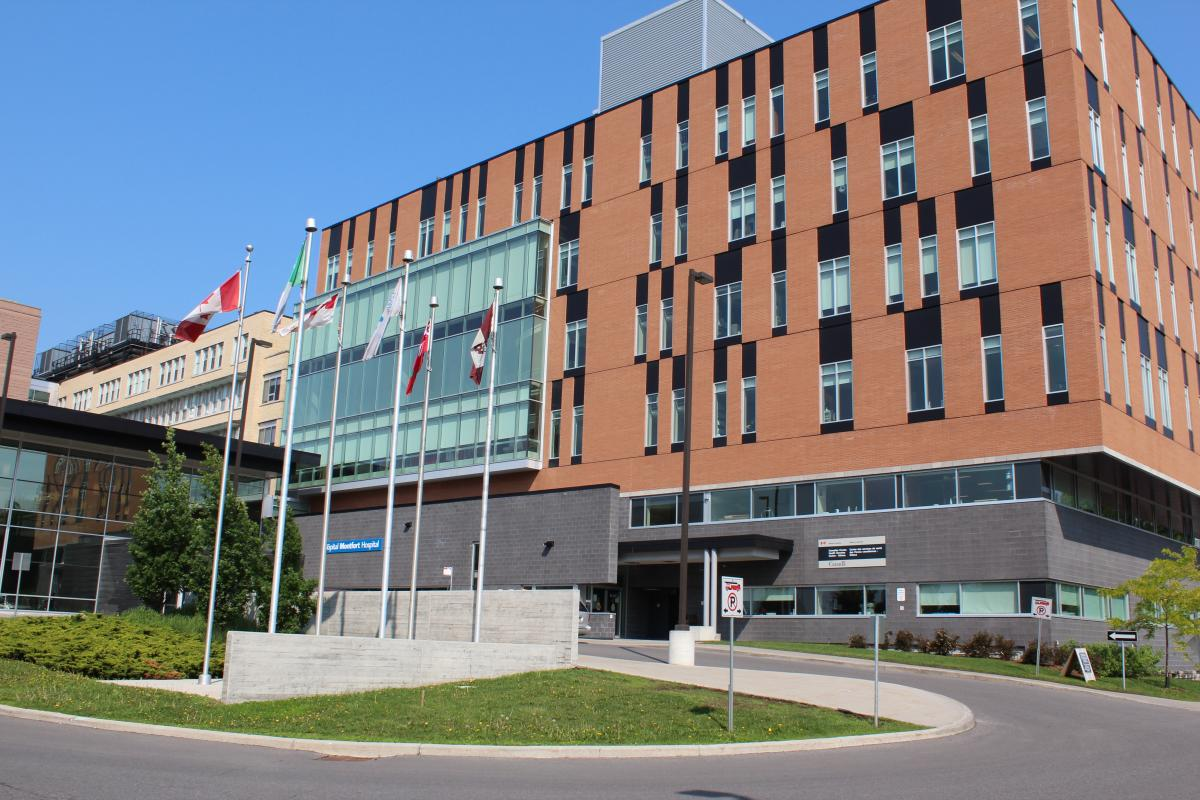
- Main entrance of Hôpital Montfort

Geography
- Location: 713 Montreal Road, Ottawa, Ontario, Canada

Organization
- Care system: Public Medicare (Canada) (OHIP)
- Type: Teaching hospital
- Affiliated university: University of Ottawa

Services
- Emergency department: Yes
- Beds: 331

History
- Founded: 1953

Links
- Website: www.hopitalmontfort.com
- Lists: Hospitals in Canada

Montfort Hospital (French: Hôpital Montfort), commonly shortened to Montfort in both English and French, is a teaching hospital affiliated with the University of Ottawa. It offers short-term primary and secondary health care, offering service in both the French and English language. The hospital serves over 1.2 million residents of Eastern Ontario, and the Gatineau region of Quebec. Montfort is the only hospital in Ottawa that administers in French and the only Francophone academic healthcare institution west of the province of Quebec.

In 2014 and 2018, Montfort was accredited by Accreditation Canada. It was recognized as a "Best Practice Spotlight Organization" from the Registered Nurses’ Association of Ontario (RNAO). In June 2013, the hospital was designated a Group A teaching hospital.

Montfort trains Francophone healthcare professionals with the help of the hospital's knowledge institute, the Institut du Savoir Montfort (ISM), and in collaboration with its main partners, the University of Ottawa and La Cité college as well as other post-secondary education programs. In 2015, it was ranked as Canada's top 40 research hospitals owing to the activities of ISM-Research.

The executive management team is led by chief executive officer Dominic Giroux. The medical team reports to Chief of Staff Dr. Chantal D'Aoust-Bernard. The chair of the board of trustees is Marie-Josée Martel.

Montfort opened in 1953. It was secularized in 1970. It expanded in 1992, and again in 2010.

== Hôpital Montfort - Facts and Figures (2023) ==
- Over 1,800 employees and over 400 physicians
- Over 400 volunteers and 45,000 volunteer hours annually
- 331 acute care beds
- 12 operating rooms
- Over 8,200 surgeries
- 3,000 births in the Family Birthing Centre
- 50,000 emergency room visits
- Over 500 students, over 100 residents and over 1800 interns
- Over 25 500 training days
- Four research chairs

== Services ==
Montfort offers a wide range of care and services, including emergency services, surgery, a mental health program and a Family Birthing Centre.

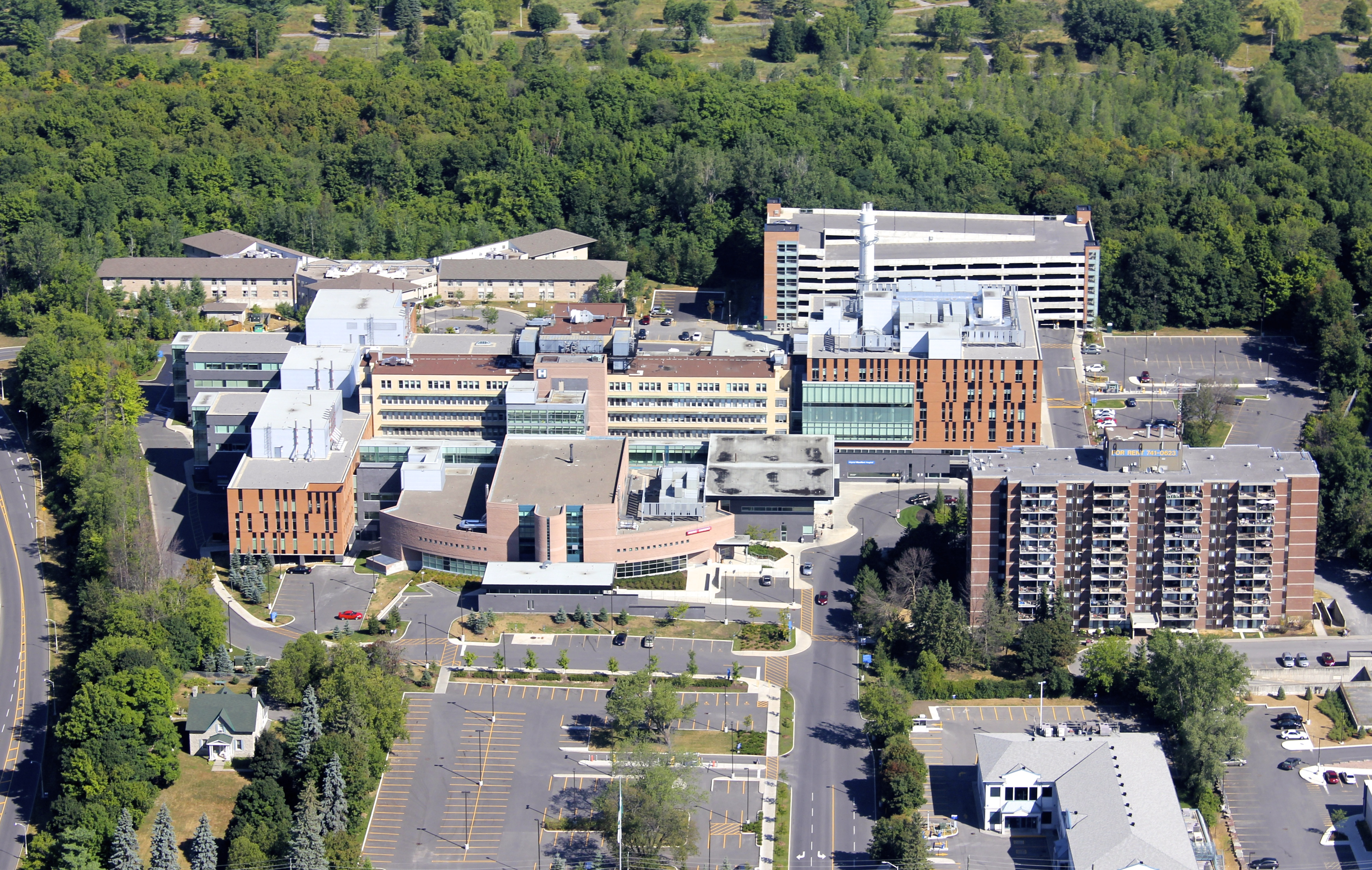
Hôpital Montfort campus as of 2012 (including expansions)

- Cardiology
- Cardiovascular and Pulmonary
- Family Birthing Centre
- Surgery
- Endoscopy
- Geriatrics
- Medical Imaging
- Rehabilitation
- Mental Health
- Therapeutic Services
- Intensive Care
- Palliative Care
- Telemedicine
- Emergency

== History ==
Originally named Saint-Louis-Marie-de-Montfort, the hospital was founded in 1953. Managed by the Catholic Daughters of Wisdom until 1969, it initially opened with a laboratory, 200 adult beds and 50 children's beds as well as emergency, surgical and radiology departments. Its humanist approach quickly cemented the hospital's important place in the community.

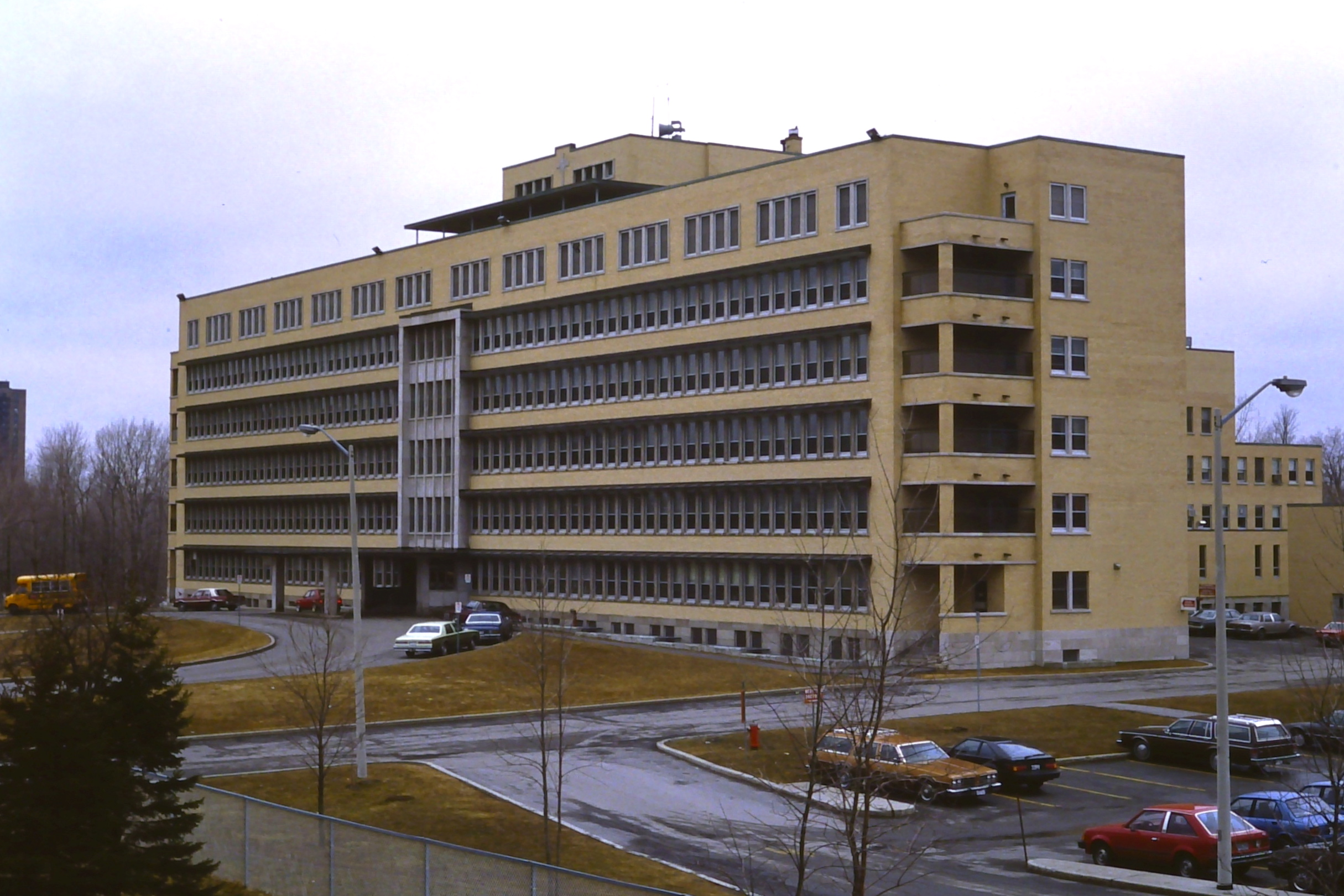
Hôpital Montfort original building, in 1982, prior to expansions.

The hospital became non-denominational and public in 1970. Various projects over the ensuing years helped modernize the hospital and expand its range of services. The psychiatry and orthopedics departments, intensive care unit, cardio-pulmonary and electroencephalography services were introduced in the 1970s. The Montfort Long-Term Care Centre (formerly the Pavillon de la Sagesse), located behind the hospital, took in its first residents in 1978. The palliative care department was created a few years later. In 1992, the South Wing (currently Wing A) opened. It housed a number of departments, including the emergency department, the surgical unit, and a new nursing care unit.

In the same year, the hospital signed an agreement with the University of Ottawa. The affiliation between the Faculty of Medicine and Montfort brought the clinical teaching of family medicine into a Francophone setting.

=== SOS Montfort ===
In 1997, the Health Services Restructuring Commission recommended closing the hospital. The public responded with immediate action and created the SOS Montfort movement led by Gisèle Lalonde. Below are a few important dates from the SOS Montfort period.

- 1997: The Health Services Restructuring Commission recommends the hospital's closure (February 24)
- 1997: Creation of the SOS Montfort Movement (February 25)
- 1997: Public rally at the Ottawa Civic Centre attended by 10,000 demonstrators
- 1998: SOS Montfort and the hospital announce their intention to take legal action to overturn the instructions of the Ontario Health Services Restructuring Commission to close the hospital (July 28)
- 1999: The Ontario Divisional Court ordered the hospital to remain open (November 29)
- 2001: The hospital wins a victory in the Court of Appeal for Ontario against the Ontario Health Services Restructuring Commission; the hospital was to remain open (December 7)

=== Renovations and expansions ===
Three new wings have been incorporated into Montfort since 2010 in addition to the two original wings, which have been completely renovated. The hospital's total floor space has more than doubled, from 300,000 to 750,000 square feet. This project made it possible to deliver more care and services to a greater number of patients. The New Montfort officially opened on June 11, 2010.

=== Important dates ===
Here are a few key dates in Montfort's history.

- 1953: Opening and official inauguration of the hospital and birth of the first baby (October 11)
- 1954: First residents and clerks from the University of Ottawa are assigned to the hospital
- 1956: Creation of the Ladies’ Auxiliary Committee (dissolved in the early 1970s)
- 1956: Opening of the Montfort School of Nursing (September); closed in 1971
- 1961: First affiliation contract with the University of Ottawa (December 28)
- 1974: Creation of the Auxiliaries/Volunteers Association
- 1986: Creation of the Montfort Hospital Foundation (April 1)
- 1989: Designation of the hospital under the French Language Services Act (November 19)
- 1990: First Health Sciences students from Cité collégiale are assigned to the hospital
- 1992: Affiliation agreement with the Faculty of Medicine, University of Ottawa, for instruction in French
- 1999: Creation of the Consortium national de formation en santé (CNFS) in partnership with the University of Ottawa
- 2010: Official opening of the New Montfort (June 11)
- 2012: Official opening of the Institut de recherche de l’Hôpital Montfort (IRHM) (March 7)
- 2013: Provincial designation as a Group A university teaching hospital (June 13)
- 2016: Launch of the Institut du savoir Montfort (January 4)

== Foundation ==
As a partner of the hospital since 1986, the Montfort Hospital Foundation supports the hospital's strategic development policies to more effectively meet the needs of its patients. Over the years, various major campaigns have taken place: "Sincerely Yours", the SOS Montfort Resistance Fund, "Building a Unique Institution Together" and "For you, Sweet Heart". The Foundation also has many donors: the general public, community organizations, companies, charitable foundations, and religious groups. The Montfort Angels program, the Newborn Club, and the direct mail solicitation program are but a few of the Foundation's programs.

== Volunteers ==
The Volunteers Association has over 300 members. Each year they contribute around 60,000 hours of volunteer time to the hospital, significantly improving the quality of patient service.

== Research and education ==
The Institut du Savoir Montfort (ISM) is the second hospital-associated institute dedicated to research and education in Ontario.

From 2012 to 2016, research at Montfort was handled by the Institut de recherche de l'Hôpital Montfort, now known as ISM-Recherche.

The purpose of ISM-Recherche is to develop and implement innovative research programs that endeavour to help improve the quality of health care, especially among Francophone populations in minority settings. Its research priorities center on the fields of mental health, primary care, nutrition and metabolism as well as family health.

Hôpital Montfort is affiliated with the University of Ottawa and it is the only health institution in Ontario that provides clinical training in a Francophone setting, with the help of ISM-Education. The hospital's educational activities encompass placements and teaching activities organized through numerous college and university programs, including medicine, nursing, and rehabilitation. It also includes continuous training for health care professionals delivered in French.
