= Collège La Cité =

College in Ontario, Canada

Coordinates: 45°26′23.62″N 75°37′37.17″W

La Cité
- Other name: Collège La Cité
- Type: Public college of applied arts and technology
- Established: 1989
- Academic affiliations: ACCC, AUCC, CBIE
- President: Lynn Casimiro
- Students: 5,000 (2025: 3,524 FTEs)
- Location: Ottawa, Ontario, Canada
- Campus: Central
- Language: French
- Colours: Green & black
- Nickname: Les Coyotes
- Sporting affiliations: CCAA
- Mascot: Coyote
- Website: www.collegelacite.ca

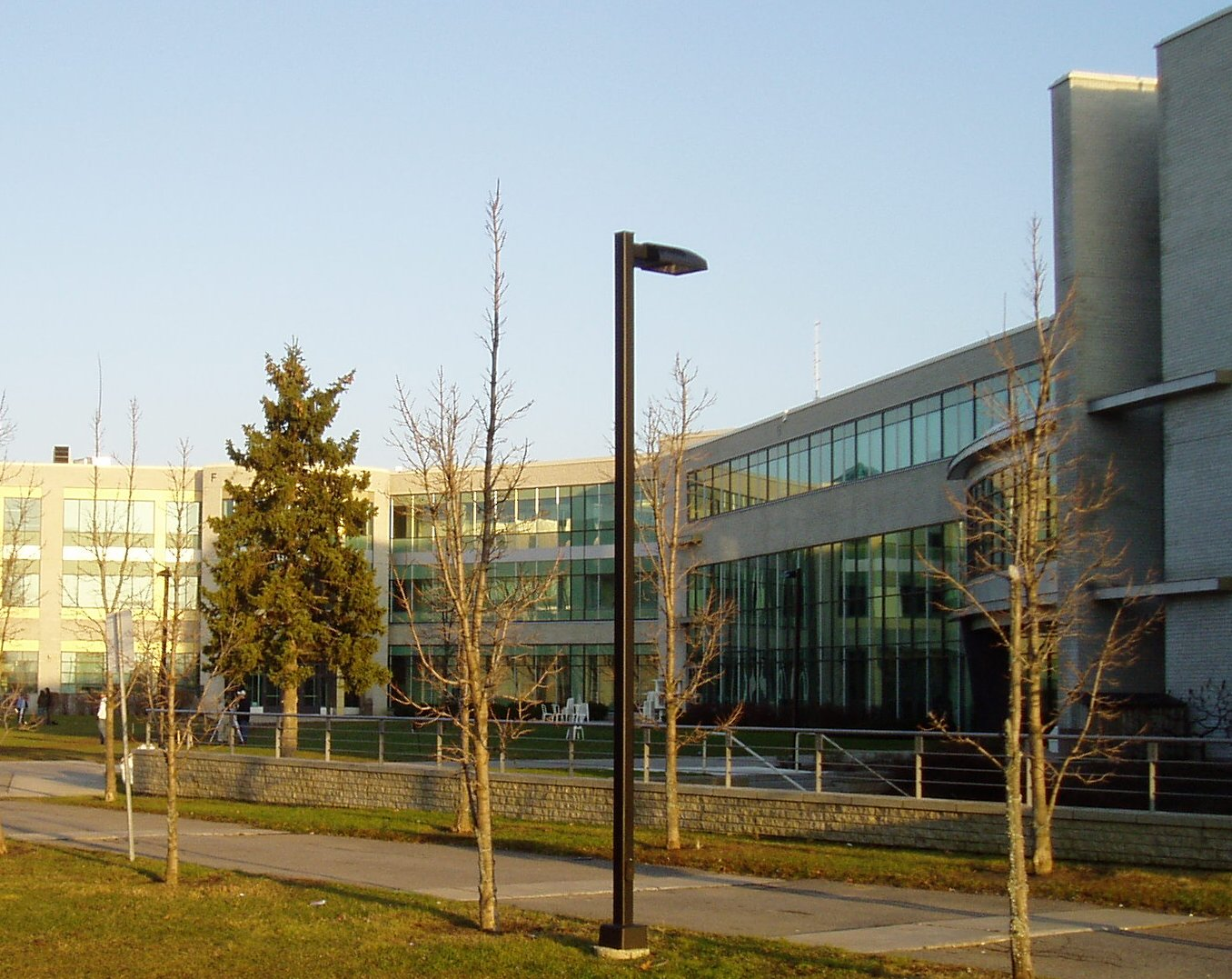
One of the buildings of La Cité's main campus

Collège La Cité, commonly known as La Cité and formerly La Cité collégiale, is a French-language public college in Ontario, Canada. Founded in 1989 in Ottawa (with a satellite campus in Hawkesbury and a business office in Toronto), it is the largest French-language college in Ontario and offers more than 90 programs to some 5,000 full-time students from Ontario, other parts of Canada, and foreign countries.

In 2011, La Cité ranked first among the 24 Ontario colleges in terms of student satisfaction, graduate employment rate, usefulness of knowledge and skills acquired, overall quality of learning experiences, and overall quality of services; according to the results of an annual survey by the Ministry of Training, Colleges and Universities. The college ranked second in terms of overall quality of the facilities.

In 2012 and 2013, La Cité was also recognized through Mediacorp Canada Inc.'s annual study ranking Canada's top employers as one of the National Capital Region's top 25 employers, while being also named among the 200 most recommended employers in the country.

== History ==
The Government of Ontario created a network of colleges in 1967. Certain colleges, including Algonquin College, in Ottawa, and St. Lawrence College, in Cornwall, offer French-language programs. As early as the 1970s, the possibility of creating a 23rd – French-language – college in Ontario was put forth. In 1987, a working group was given the mandate, by the Government of Ontario, of considering the appropriateness of designating certain colleges as organisations offering services in French under Bill 8, the Ontario law on French-language services. The group concluded that the idea of creating a French college should be given priority over the college designation plan. The Minister of Colleges and Universities and Minister Responsible for Francophone Affairs agreed. In August 1988, the Ontario Cabinet approved, in principle, the creation of a French-language college with an exclusive mandate to deliver services in French. In 1989, the Ministry of Training, Colleges and Universities and the Department of the Secretary of State of Canada arrived at a cost-sharing agreement relating to the establishment of such a college in Eastern Ontario, a college bearing the official name « Collège d’arts appliqués et de technologie La Cité ».

La Cité opened its doors to 2,300 students in September 1990, in temporary facilities on St-Laurent Blvd in Ottawa. In 1993, the college purchased, from the Department of Public Works of Canada, the land on which sat the former Carson School of Languages, contiguous to Aviation Parkway. Construction began the same year and the permanent campus of La Cité collégiale was ready for the start of the 1995–1996 school year. Sitting on 24 hectares (59 acres) of land, the campus included eight buildings designed by Brisbin Brook Beynon Architects (BBB Architects), Panzini Architectes and Paquet: "The primary issue raised at the time of conception arose from a singular statement concerned with the affirmation of one culture in the midst of another; the underlying significance of La Cité as a symbol of the Franco Ontarian identity within the community at large."

Through the years, enrolment has grown and the range of training opportunities offered has continued to widen.

In 2013, the college went through a rebranding exercise with a new logo and a new brand, La Cité.

== Presidents ==
The first president of the college, Andrée Lortie, helmed the establishment until her retirement in March 2010. She was replaced by Lise Bourgeois, who had been head of the Conseil des écoles catholiques du Centre-Est (CECCE) (Ontario) (Central-Eastern Catholic School Board), the largest French school board in Canada outside of the province of Québec.

== Campuses ==
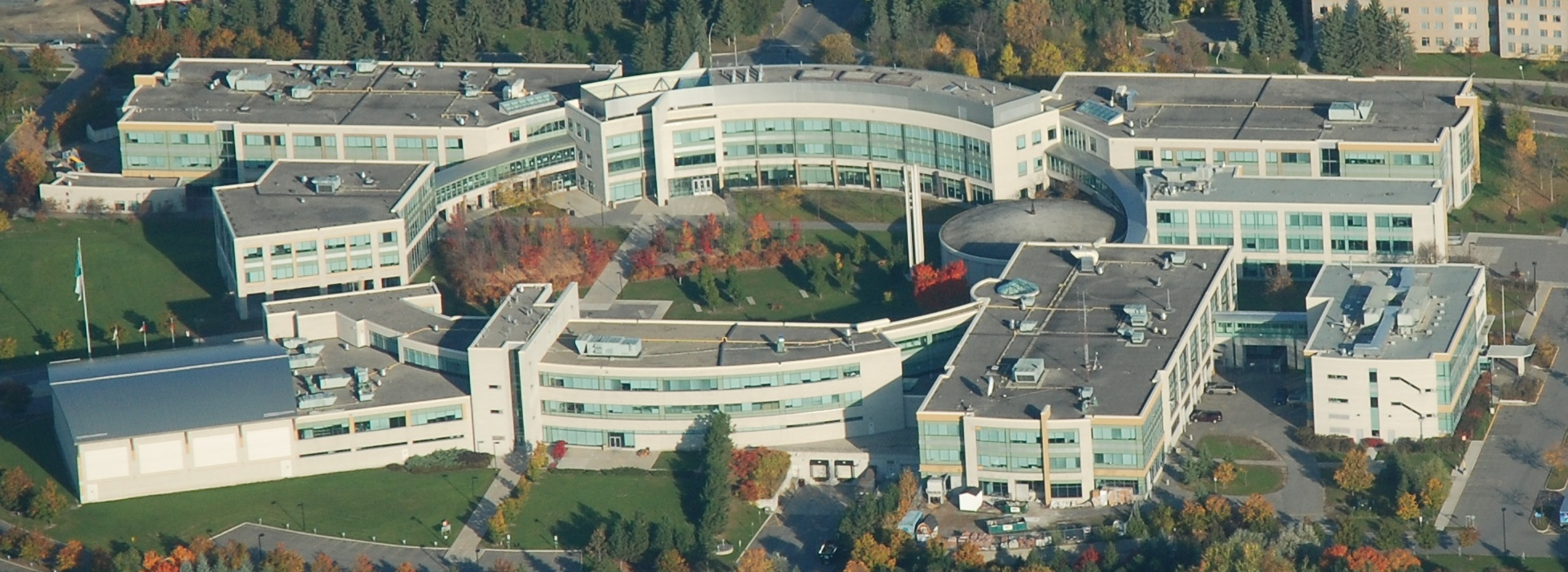
Main campus

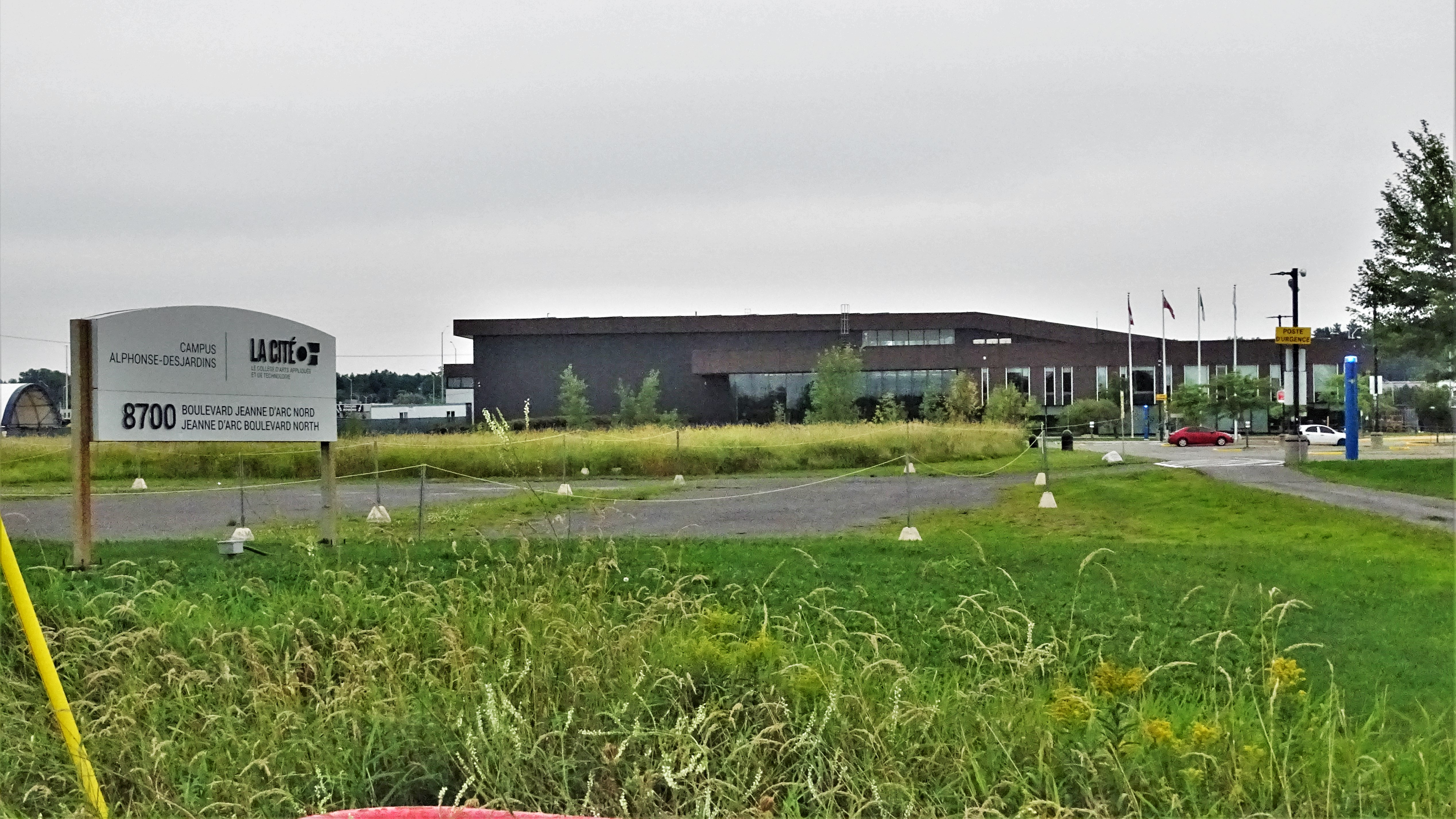
Alphonse-Desjardins campus

The main campus of La Cité is in Ottawa. It has ten buildings built on 60 acres (24 hectares) of land, all of which are connected by skyways or tunnels. In September 2010, another campus, the Alphonse-Desjardins campus, was inaugurated in Orléans, an eastern suburb of Ottawa. It houses the college's Centre des métiers Minto, a training centre specializing in the construction trades. In September 2011, the 911 Institute, an emergency services training centre, opened its doors on the main campus. La Cité also has a satellite campus in Hawkesbury, an Eastern Ontario town about 100 km (62 mi) from Ottawa. The college now offers a few programs in Toronto.

== Programs ==
Many of its more than 90 training programs include the teaching of terminology in both of Canada's official languages (French and English). The college also offers apprenticeship programs, in French, in the construction, motive power, service, and industrial sectors. La Cité offers postsecondary training in the following fields:

- Administration
- Applied sciences
- Apprenticeship programs
- Arts and design
- Communications
- Computers
- Construction and mechanics
- Electronics
- Aesthetics and hairdressing
- Forest environment
- Health sciences
- Hospitality
- Housing and interior design
- Legal services
- Media
- Preparatory programs
- Security
- Social sciences
- Tourism and leisure

La Cité offers one degree program:

- Baccalauréat en technologie appliquée (Biotechnologie)

== Residence ==
The student residence at La Cité opened in 2002. The four-storey building, close to the college's main campus, has 124 units and houses 251 students.

== Logo ==
La Cité has used three different logos throughout its existence:

- The first was the letter "C" formed with 18 angle brackets, each representing a smaller C. The text "La Cité collégiale" was written underneath it, using the Century Gothic typeface. The logo features a light green colour. It was sometimes accompanied with the generic slogan "Le collège d'arts appliqués et de technologie", which is also used in several institutions' full names, such as Algonquin College.
- The second featured the college name written in a new, all-lowercase black font, with bold text used for "cité". A blue, C-shaped swoosh-like form circled the logo. The text and then-slogan, "Le Collège des meilleures pratiques", was written underneath using italics.
- The third logo maintains the black colours, but omits blue symbolism and uses a new font with all-capital letters. The college name is shortened to "La Cité", written in bold. The font resembles that used in the TFO logo, a French-language television network with which the college is partnered. To the right of this name is a green circle, representing the college's circular building. The "meilleurs pratiques" slogan is replaced with first logo's generic slogan, written in regular typeface.

These logos received mixed reception.

1990 - 2002

2003 - October 2013

November 2013 – present

== Partnerships ==
La Cité has signed articulation agreements with universities from across Canada. Those agreements allow college graduates to pursue undergraduate or graduate university studies in various fields, including administration, mechanical engineering, computer sciences, journalism.

La Cité has also partnered with elearnnetwork.ca to help promote their online courses and programs.

Internationally, the college has several partnerships with institutions in other countries to transfer expertise through technical assistance and training programs.

== Scholarships ==
The Foundation of La Cité offers hundreds of scholarships to college students, including 250 entrance awards.

== Sports ==
La Cité's athletic teams, known as Coyotes, are managed by the school's student association, the "Association Étudiante de La Cité". They participate in intercollegiate competitions in men's and women's soccer (football), men's and women's volleyball, and men's basketball. The college is a member of the Ontario Colleges Athletic Association (OCAA) and the Canadian Colleges Athletic Association (CCAA).

== Media ==
La Cité offers a campus and internet radio station, Lab Radio, as part of its media course. It uses call sign CKS608 and broadcasts as an ultra-low power radio station on 91.9 FM.

== Notable alumni ==
- Francis Drouin - Liberal politician
- Gisèle Lagacé - comics writer and artist

== See also ==
- Canadian government scientific research organizations
- Canadian industrial research and development organizations
- Canadian university scientific research organizations
- Higher education in Ontario
- List of colleges in Ontario
- List of universities in Ontario
