= Université de l'Ontario français =

Public university in Toronto, Canada

Coordinates: 43°38′40.6″N 79°22′06.9″W

- Type: Public university
- Established: 9 April 2018; 8 years ago
- Academic affiliations: ACUFC; Council of Ontario Universities (COU) - Associate Member
- Chair: Marie-Lison Fougère
- Chancellor: Paul Rouleau
- President: Prof. Normand Labrie
- Total staff: Over 50
- Undergraduates: 233 (2023)
- Location: 9 Lower Jarvis Street, Toronto, Ontario, M5E 0C3, Toronto, Canada
- Language: French
- Website: uontario.ca

The Université de l'Ontario français (UOF; lit. 'University of French Ontario') is a French-language public university in Toronto, Ontario, Canada.

The university is the first stand-alone francophone university opened in the province, having been incorporated by the Legislative Assembly of Ontario in April 2018. (Note: French is also used as an official instructional language at several other Ontario-based universities, although most of these universities operate as bilingual English and French institutions, where both languages are used for university operations. In addition to these institutions, there exists several affiliated institutions in Ontario that operate as either French language- or bilingual institutions. Several other Francophone universities have been chartered in Ontario since the Université de l'Ontario français was incorporated.) The institution offered its first academic certificate program in September 2019, and accepted its first cohort of full-time undergraduate students in 2021.

== History ==
Efforts to establish a Francophone university in Central and Southwestern Ontario date back to the 1970s and the demands gained political traction in the 2010s with several Franco-Ontarian groups, including the Francophone Assembly of Ontario, releasing a report that recommended the creation of a Francophone university within that region on 3 October 2014. A private member's bill to establish a Francophone university was later introduced in the Legislative Assembly of Ontario on 26 May 2015. However, the bill failed to pass as the legislature was prorogued. While the legislature was prorogued, a report released by the Advisory Committee on French-language Post-secondary Education in Central and Southwestern Ontario noted that post-secondary Francophone education was insufficient in central and southwestern Ontario, and recommended establishing a Francophone university within Greater Toronto to help rectify the issue.

On 22 September 2016, a provincial planning committee was created to help establish the institution, chaired by Dyane Adam, the former federal Commissioner of Official Languages, and made up of members from Toronto-based universities including Toronto Metropolitan University and the University of Toronto; the president of the provincial French-language public broadcaster TFO; and members from Franco-Ontarian organizations. The legislation establishing the institution, the Université de l’Ontario français Act, 2017, received royal assent on 14 December 2017, and formally went into effect on 9 April 2018 at the same time as the appointment of the university's first board of governors. Normand Labrie was appointed by the board of governors as the university's interim president on 1 July 2018 and served until 30 June 2019. He was succeeded by Professor André Roy who was appointed president in August 2020. In February 2021, Roy resigned for personal reasons and the university's two vice-presidents at the time, Denis Berthiaume and Edith Dumont, served as the university's interim co-presidents until July 2021.

Following the 2018 Ontario general election, the newly formed Progressive Conservative government announced plans to cancel funding for the establishment of the institution. The question of funding became a major political issue for the new government among the province's Franco-Ontarian residents and it resonated with francophones across the country. Franco-Ontarian Member of Provincial Parliament Amanda Simard crossed the floor from the Progressive Conservatives, eventually joining the Liberal party, citing the decision as part of the reason for her move. However, in September 2019, the governments of Ontario and Canada announced they had signed a memorandum of understanding, which would see both governments provide C$126 million to fund the institution over the following eight years.

The university offered its first academic program in September 2019, a graduate-level higher education pedagogy program for members of the teaching faculty at Collège La Cité. The university's first graduate certificates were issued for those who completed the program. In January 2021, it was announced the university had only received 19 applicants from Ontario secondary school students for admission into its Fall 2021 cohort, much lower than the expected 200 applicants. There were a total of 151 full-time undergraduate students enrolled at the university when classes began in September 2021. Enrolment rates has increased since its opening year, with the university seeing a growth of over 160 per cent from 2021 to 2022 and an additional 20 per cent increase from 2022 to 2023. In 2023, there were 233 students at the university, with nearly one-third of them enrolled in the university's Bachelor of Education program. In its first two years, most students were international students. For the 2023–24 academic year, about 50 per cent of students will be from Canada.

== Campus ==
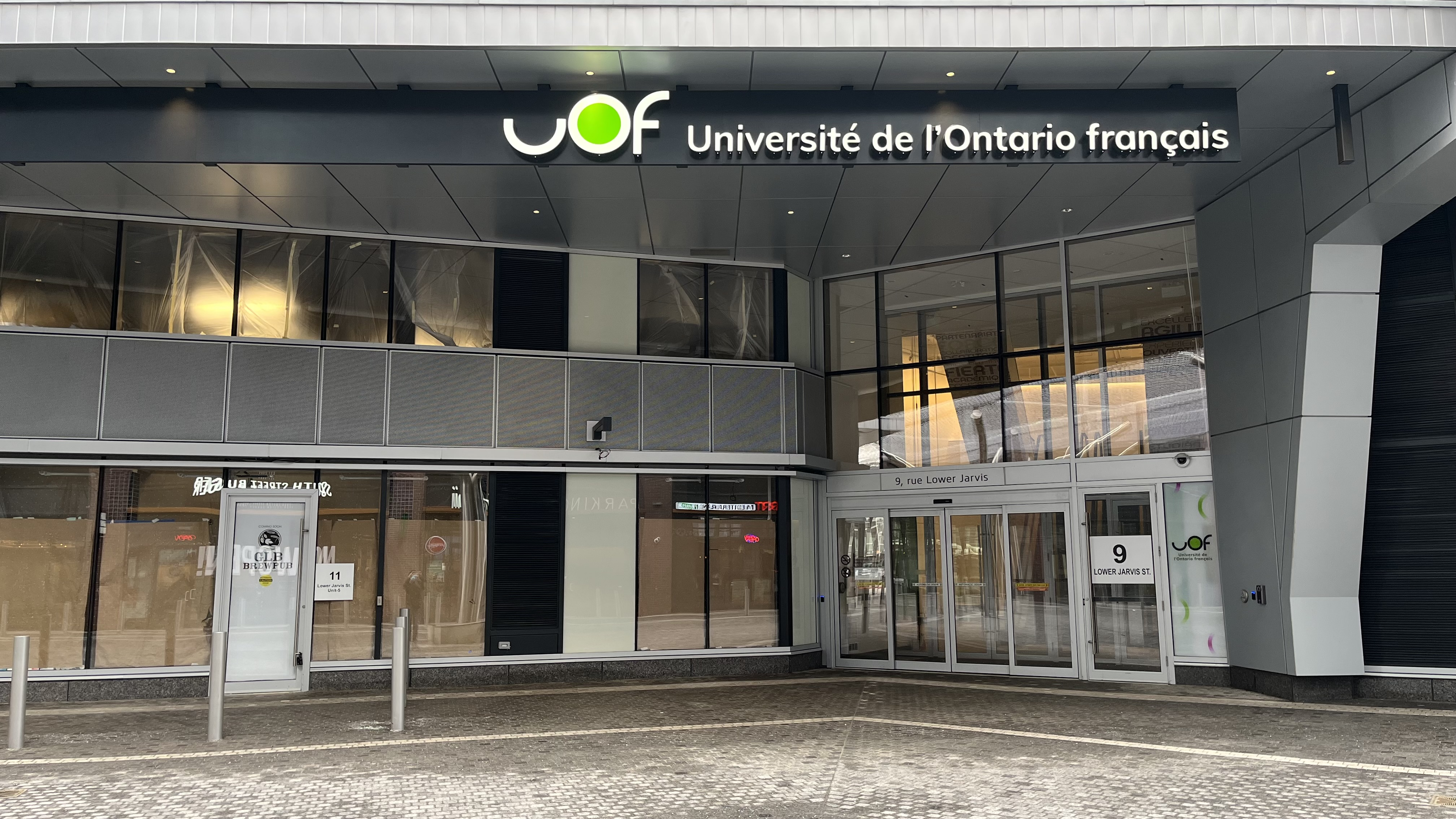
Entrance to the university's campus at 9 Lower Jarvis Street

The Université de l'Ontario français is situated in downtown Toronto, near the shoreline of Lake Ontario. The university campus is located at 9 Lower Jarvis Street, at the base of a high-rise in the East Bayfront neighbourhood of downtown Toronto. The university leases 4,654 square metres (50,100 sq ft) of space within the building.

== Programs and Academics ==
The UOF offers a bachelor's of education in addition to seven other transdisciplinary bachelor's programs :

- administration des affaires (Business administration) (as of September 2024);
- études de la pluralité humaine;
- études de l'économie et de l'innovation sociale;
- études des environnements urbains;
- études des communications et médias numériques;
- études de la santé mentale (as of September 2025);
- baccalauréat ès arts et en éducation combinés (combined B. A and B.Ed. bachelor's degree) (as of September 2026).

In November 2023, the UOF inaugurated the Observatoire en immigration francophone au Canada (OIFC), whose mission is to "promote the establishment and integration of Francophone immigrants".

French is used as the primary language of instruction. The institution is the first stand-alone Francophone university to open in Ontario. As French is the instructional language of the university, prospective students are required to have either taken three years of French language studies in secondary school or pass a French language proficiency test.

In November 2022, the university offered four Bachelor of Social Science degree programs. The university launched its Bachelor of Education program in January 2023.

== Administration ==
The bicameral system of the university's governance consists of two governing bodies: the Board of Governors and the Senate, both of which are established in the Université de l'Ontario français Act, 2017. The board of governors is responsible for governing and managing the university. The Board is made up of up to 13 external members (appointed by the Board and by Ontario's Lieutenant Governor in Council) and 9 internal members from the university's administration, faculty, and student body. The senate is responsible for the university's academic and education policy, including standards for admission and qualifications for degrees, diplomas, and certificates issued by the university.

The university's president and vice-chancellor serve as the university's chief executive officer. Since May 2024, Normand Labrie is the sitting president and vice-chancellor, preceded by Pierre Ouellette, who was appointed by the board of governors as president in June 2021 and took office on 7 July 2021. The position was previously held by André Roy, who served as the university's president from August 2020 to February 2021, and Normand Labrie from July 2018 to July 2019. Denis Berthiaume and Edith Dumont served as interim co-presidents from Roy's departure to Ouellette's appointment. On 20 October 2021, the board of governors appointed Paul Rouleau as chancellor and titular head of the university.

== Revue Enjeux et société ==
The Université de l'Ontario français publishes an academic journal titled "Enjeux et société : approches transdisciplinaires," which is available as open access on the Érudit platform. This interdisciplinary journal focuses on digital cultures, the globalized economy, urban environments, and human diversity.

== See also ==
- Education in Toronto
- Higher education in Ontario
- List of universities in Ontario
