= Regulation 17 =

Regulation of the Government of Ontario, Canada

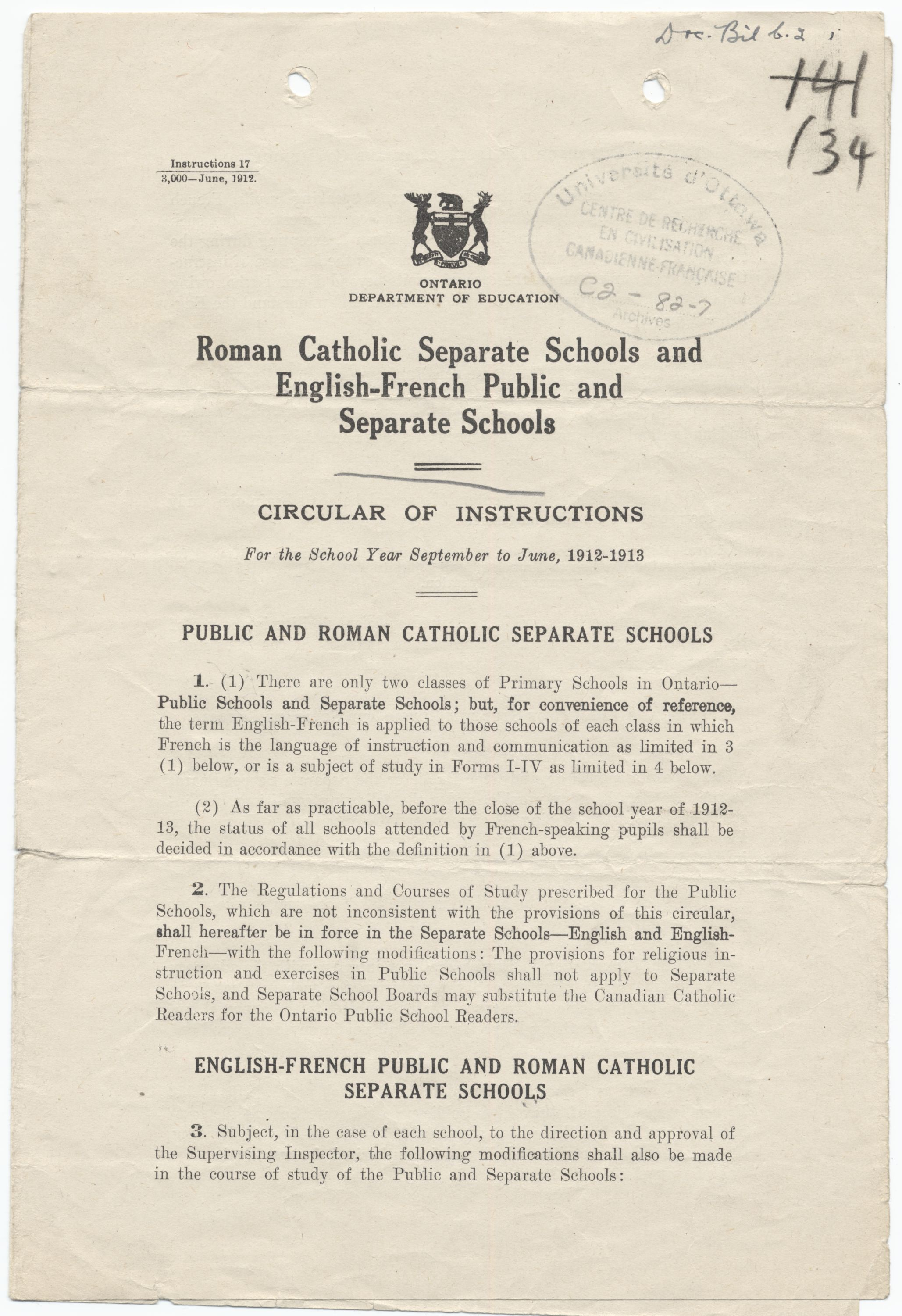
Regulation 17

Regulation 17 (French: Règlement 17) was a regulation of the Government of Ontario, Canada, designed to limit instruction in French-language Catholic separate schools. The regulation was written by the Ministry of Education and was issued in July 1912 by the Progressive Conservative government of premier Sir James P. Whitney. It forbade teaching French beyond grade two in all separate schools.

In 1913, the Jesuits opened Collège Sacré-Coeur in Sudbury. It was bilingual up until 1914, at which time the Government of Ontario granted it a Charter and made no mention of language or religion. The College did not come under authority of the Department of Education for its programs or any subsidies. In 1916, the College became a free institution that was exclusively French.

Regulation 17 was amended in 1913, and it is that version that was applied throughout Ontario. As a result, French Canadians distanced themselves from the subsequent World War I effort, as its young men refused to enlist. The regulation was later repealed in 1927.

== Reaction ==
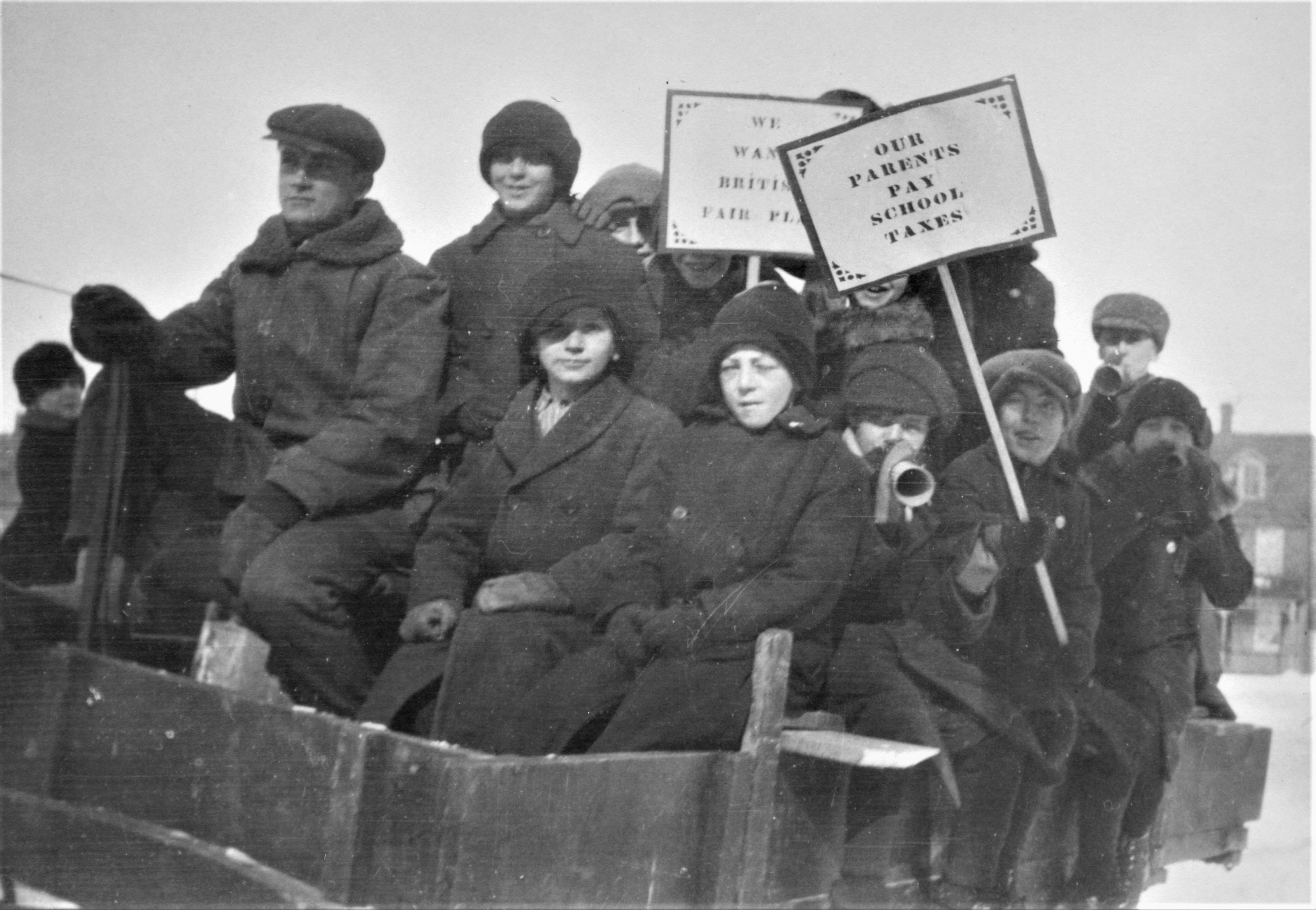
Protest against Regulation 17 in the streets of Ottawa, February 1916

French Canadians reacted with outrage. Quebec journalist Henri Bourassa in November 1914 denounced the "Prussians of Ontario." With the World War raging, this was a stinging insult. The policy was strongly opposed by Franco-Ontarians, particularly in the national capital of Ottawa where the École Guigues was at the centre of the Battle of the Hatpins. The newspaper Le Droit, which is still published today as the province's only francophone daily newspaper, was established by the Missionary Oblates of Mary Immaculate in 1913 to oppose the ban. Faced with separate school boards' resistance and defiance of the new regulation, the Ministry of Education issued Regulation 18 in August 1913 to coerce the school boards' employees into compliance.

Ontario's Catholics were led by the Irish Bishop Fallon, who united with the Protestants in opposing French schools.

In 1915, the provincial government of Sir William Hearst replaced Ottawa's elected separate school board with a government-appointed commission. After years of litigation from ACFÉO, however, the directive was never fully implemented.

== Repeal and legacy ==
The regulation was eventually repealed in 1927 by the government of Howard Ferguson following the recommendations of the Merchant-Scott-Côté report. Ferguson was an opponent of bilingualism, but repealed the law because he needed to form a political alliance with Quebec premier Louis-Alexandre Taschereau against the federal government. The Conservative government reluctantly recognized bilingual schools, but the directive worsened relations between Ontario and Quebec for many years and is still keenly remembered by the French-speaking minority of Ontario.

Despite the repeal of Regulation 17, however, French-language schools in Ontario were not officially recognized under the provincial Education Act until 1969, with the first French-language high schools in the province officially opening in late 1969 and 1970. Students were allowed to be taught in French, while still under the English school board system. Francophones were finally allowed to have their own school boards by the province under Act 121 and Act 122, which allowed them to elect trustees to these public (non-denominational) school boards; Catholic French-language school boards would follow a few years after.

The Ontario Heritage Trust erected a plaque for L’École Guigues and Regulation 17 in front of the former school building, 159 Murray Street, Ottawa. "L’École Guigues became the centre of minority-rights agitation in Ontario when in 1912 the provincial government issued a directive, commonly called Regulation 17, restricting French-language education. Mounting protests forced the government to moderate its policy and in 1927 bilingual schools were officially recognized."
