= Dominic Giroux =

Canadian university and hospital administrator

Vice Chancellor of Laurentian University
- In office April 1, 2009 – June 2017
- Preceded by: Judith Woodsworth
- Succeeded by: Pierre Zundel (Interim)

10th President of Laurentian University
- In office April 1, 2009 – June 2017
- Preceded by: Robert Bourgeois
- Succeeded by: Pierre Zundel (Interim)

Personal details
- Education: University of Ottawa; Université de Montréal

Dominic Giroux is the president and chief executive officer of the Montfort Hospital in Ottawa, Canada. He served as Laurentian University's tenth President and Vice-Chancellor from 2009 to 2017. Afterwards, he worked at Health Sciences North (2017-2023).

== Career ==
=== Laurentian Presidency ===
Under his leadership, Laurentian secured funding for the construction of the Vale Living With Lakes Centre, approval and funding for the launch of the Northern Ontario School of Architecture, the first school of architecture in Canada in over 40 years, a $10 million naming gift from Stan Bharti for the school of engineering, as well as a $14 million matching pledge from the City of Barrie for Laurentian's proposed downtown Barrie campus. The campus never materialized - the provincial government declined to fund it. The university appointed in 2010 its first-ever Chancellor, Aline Chrétien, established in 2011 a new School of Mines, opened in 2012 a new 236-bed student residence on its Sudbury campus, and launched a new 2012-2017 Strategic Plan. During his tenure as President, Giroux was criticized for his role in the defection of NDP MP Glenn Thibeault to the provincial Liberal party, encouraging him to hold out for a cabinet position. After his departure, it was revealed that Giroux had negotiated a deal granting him permanent unpaid leave from Laurentian and a full-time job as a Full Professor if he were to return to the school.

=== Involvement in Laurentian Insolvency ===
After a number of high profile expenditures under his watch and immediately following President Giroux’s departure to Health Sciences North as CEO, the university fell into serious financial difficulties, including the accumulation of deficits and massive cuts, as well as enduring a 2 week faculty strike, the first since 1989. The fiscal problems culminated in the declaration of insolvency by Laurentian University, leading to the unprecedented termination of >100 tenured and tenure track faculty and > 40 staff, along with the closure of 69 programs The insolvency of Laurentian University in Feb 2021 was followed by questions regarding the role of Giroux, the Board of Governors, and other administrative leaders in the crisis. Of particular note were the declarations of annual balanced budgets by Giroux despite the provincial advisor Alan Harrison concluding that Laurentian University had been running longstanding deficits and ran the University from a single bank account. Giroux cosigned a letter with three previous Chairs of the Board of Governors blaming unforeseen factors such as the Ontario government's refusal to fund Laurentian's Barrie campus, the mandated 10% tuition cut and freeze, and the COVID pandemic for the fiscal crisis. Nonetheless, Robert Haché, the President of Laurentian University since 2019, pointed to decisions made during the Giroux presidency as the root cause of the insolvency.

=== Further career ===
Giroux started in education as a school board trustee at 19 and board chair at 21 in Ottawa. Prior to his appointment at Laurentian in 2009, Mr. Giroux was assistant deputy minister with the Ontario Ministry of Education and the Ministry of Training, Colleges and Universities, after having served as CFO of two French language school boards in southern and eastern Ontario. After his tenure at Laurentian University, he become CEO of Health Sciences North in 2017 where he stayed until 2023, when it was announced that he would become CEO of Montfort Hospital.

Giroux was appointed in June 2011 as one of four members of the Commission on the Reform of Ontario's Public Services, chaired by Don Drummond, which was tasked to recommend to the government how to deliver the most efficient public services possible (Drummond Report). He also served as co-special advisor on the implementation of a Northern Policy Institute and was appointed to the Northern Ontario Ring of Fire Advisory Council.

Giroux serves as chair of the board of directors of the Northern Ontario School of Medicine, national co-chair of the Consortium national de formation en santé (CNFS), co-chair of the Ontario Council on Articulation and Transfer (ONCAT), and board member of the Centre for Excellence in Mining Innovation (CEMI), the Greater Sudbury Development Corporation (GSDC) and the Banque d'aliments Sudbury Food Bank. He is a former vice chair of the Association des universités de la francophonie canadienne (AUFC) and the Ottawa chapter of the Francophone Assembly of Ontario, and former board member of the Canadian Education Association (CEA), the Education Quality and Accountability Office (EQAO), and Montfort Hospital in Ottawa.

A member of the Ontario College of Teachers, Giroux holds bachelor's degrees in social sciences and education from the University of Ottawa, as well as an MBA from HEC Montréal. The University of Ottawa gave him the "Leadership in Education Award" in 2007, while HEC gave him a "Talented Young Manager" Award in the large business category in 2008. In 2011, he received one of Canada's "Top 40 Under 40" Awards and was named the 2010 Education Personality of the Year by Radio-Canada/Le Droit.
