= Mining Innovation Rehabilitation and Applied Research Corporation =

Canadian research firm

Coordinates: 46°28′2.121″N 80°58′25.5936″W

- Company type: Non-profit Organization
- Industry: Mining
- Founded: 1987 (as Geomechanics Research Centre)
- Headquarters: Greater Sudbury, Ontario, Canada, Sudbury, Canada
- Key people: President, Dr. Nadia Mykytczuk, CEO
- Owner: Laurentian University
- Website: www.mirarco.org

Mining Innovation Rehabilitation and Applied Research Corporation, or MIRARCO, is the "largest not-for-profit applied research firm in North America."

MIRARCO is made up of five centers:

- Energy
- Geomechanics (GRC)
- Safety
- Software, and
- Biotechnology (new)

== CEM (Centre for Environmental Monitoring) ==
CEM develops "analytical systems and remote monitoring technologies" and provides "research and technical services" to support resource industries. CEM's primary concern is environmental sustainability.

CEM's expertise includes:

- Environmental Systems Monitoring
- Remediation of Mine Sites
- Environmental Data Management and Interpretation
- Ecotoxicological Research
- Mine Operation Environmental Effects Monitoring
- Analytical Method Development, and
- Geological Monitoring

== GRC (Geomechanics Research Centre) ==
GRC conducts "engineering and scientific research and development in the field of geotechnical engineering," applying its findings to "promote safer and more economical excavations at depth." GRC's primary concern is geological risk assessment and management.

GRC's expertise includes:

- Static and Impact Testing of Support
- Performance Assessments
- Support in Burst-prone Ground
- Drillability Assessment
- The Potash Roof Inspection System (PRIS) and the CRack Identification System (CRIS) (both are types of Ground-Penetrating Radar systems).
- Borehole Acoustic Televiewer

== EVO (Enhanced Visualization and Optimization) ==
EVO was created in 2008 from the former CMT (Centre for Mining Technology) and VREX (Virtual Reality Exploration) groups. CMT focused on technology projects like Water-jet scaling and mine planning, while VREX focused on mine safety, and integration, interpretation, and visualization through its Virtual Reality Laboratory (owned by Laurentian University).

The combined group now focuses its efforts on creating and using software for the mining industry. Its first major software product was the Schedule Optimization Tool (SOT), which launched in June 2008. The SOT uses a Genetic Algorithm to produce optimal schedules for underground mining operations.

EVO also has ongoing projects in virtual reality safety, mine ventilation, and long-term mine planning. In addition, EVO is building an open-source data visualization and integration product called ParaViewGeo, a derivative of ParaView.

== Open-source software ==
MIRARCO is a supporter of open-source software, and tries to promote use of open-source software throughout the company. One of MIRARCO's projects, ParaViewGeo, is licensed under the BSD license. Many of the projects at MIRARCO are completed using open-source programming languages, such as Python, Java, OpenGL, and Processing, and some of MIRARCO's lab computers feature the Fedora Linux operating system instead of, or in addition to, Microsoft Windows.

=== Software Freedom Day ===
On September 20, 2008, MIRARCO participated in Software Freedom Day, an annual worldwide celebration of free/open-source software. Robert Maynard, lead programmer of ParaViewGeo presented the results of a four-month effort to rapidly teach a group of seven co-op students how to program Python and how to use ParaViewGeo.

== Mining research cluster ==
MIRARCO used to share a floor in the Willet Green Miller Centre with CEMI (Centre for Excellence in Mining Innovation), but has since moved into the second floor of the Cliff Fielding Building right across the Innovation Space. An open-house was held on August 22, 2008 to showcase the original four research organizations to the public.

The goal for the organizations sharing the same location is to increase communication between stakeholders in mining research. Former President and CEO of MIRARCO, and now Founding Director of CEMI, Dr. Peter Kaiser described the move as sounding "primitive, but it's sometimes amazing how big the gap is across a parking lot, between a building and another one," and that "[if] we have these things all separated, we cannot reap the benefits from the integrated approach."
