= Lynn Wells =

Canadian university president

Lynn Wells is a Canadian academic administrator serving as the twelfth president of Laurentian University since 2024.

== Life ==
Wells earned a honours B.A. in English and French studies and a M.A. in English from York University. She received a Ph.D. in English from University of Western Ontario.

At the University of Regina's faculty of arts, Wells was an acting dean and associate dean of research and graduate studies in the faculty of arts. She was vice-president of academics at the First Nations University of Canada. Wells was a provost and vice-president of academics at Brock University. She served as its interim president for fifteen months. In December 2023, she was announced as the incoming twelfth president and vice-chancellor of Laurentian University, succeeding interim president Sheila Embleton. Her initial contract runs from April 1, 2024, to March 31, 2029.
