= Bengen =

Bengen is a German surname. Notable people with the surname include:

- Harold Bengen (1879–1962), German artist and art teacher
- William Bengen (born 1947), American finance writer

== See also ==
- Bergen (name)
- Hengen
