= Rudolf Bredow =

German painter

Rudolf Bredow (born 2 November 1909 in Berlin, died 17 November 1973 in Bremen), German post-expressionist painter, draughtsman and art teacher.

Bredow's lifework became famous only after his death. It comprises ca. 1000 documented works (watercolour paintings, coloured chalk drawings, oil paintings and figurines) and numerous previously unreleased drawings. "Bredow’s best works are classical in their simplicity and balance and are equal or quite often even superior to Schmidt-Rottluff’s late black-rimmed watercolour paintings, for instance". The artist is considered to be "one of the greatest discoveries of the German art market during the 90’s".

== Life ==
1930–1934: he studied at the arts and crafts school in Berlin and took lessons with the graphic artist Hans Orlowski (1894–1967), the costume and stage designer Harold Bengen and the painter Max Kaus (1891–1977). After finishing his vocational education he became a painter and graphic artist for film, advertisement, fashion and theatre in Berlin. He was befriended with Bogislav Barlog and was acquainted with Erich Heckel and Karl Schmidt-Rottluff. 1940–1942: he worked as art teacher in Berlin, afterwards did his military service in the German Armed Forces. 1949: he became teacher for costume design and taught drawing and painting at the municipal technical college for textile industry and fashion. 1952–1954: he was art master at the vocational school Berlin-Neukölln and in 1954 director of the sketch courses at the dressmaker's guild Berlin. Since 1955 he had been working as art teacher at private and public schools (Bad Sachsa 1955–1964; Langeoog 1957–1958; Hinterzarten 1959; Oberhausen 1961–1964, 1966–1971; Bad Honnef 1964–1966; Schloss Schwarzenberg 1971–1973; since 1973 at the public boarding school of Lower Saxony in Esens/ East Frisia). On 17 November 1973 Bredow died during an eye operation in Bremen. He was interred in Nienburg. Bredlow's estate became Sofie Walter's († 2005) property by order of the local court in Aurich. In 1989 the art collection Tumulka (Munich) took over the largest part of Bredow's works. The artist's written estate has been kept safe in the archive for fine arts of the Germanic National Museum in Nuremberg since 1992.

== Artistic Development ==
Bredow is an "artist of the lost generation", who were born during the turn of the century and due to the confusion during the world wars and the artistic dictatorship of the National Socialists cannot be classified to a movement that belongs to abstraction or the Art Informel, which were accepted after 1945. Like other artist of this generation (Eduard Bargheer, Werner Gilles, Werner Heldt, Xaver Fuhr, Hans Puhrmann, Philipp Bauknecht, Hermann Teuber, Alfons Klein, Heinrich Steiner, Wendelin Schied etc.), who were around 40 or 50 years old, Bredow also took up the techniques of cubism, abstraction and especially of expressionism, when he continued his work after 1945. From this he developed his post-expressionist style, whose foundations he laid in 1955 and which led to artistically mature and independent late works of art from 1960/1 until his early death in 1973. Bredow did not focus on representing a certain motif. Concerning themes he, as a draughtsman, preferred sketched nature observations and romanced figuration in the foreground. As a watercolour artist he favoured the condensed visual experience of landscape or still life and in oil paintings the depiction of idealised or sometimes abstract females. The dominating theme in his coloured chalk drawings are figurative, such as depictions of Christ and the saints.

Journeys play an important role in artistic advancement. In 1941 and 1949 Bredow visited the Baltic Sea and in 1957-158 the North Sea (Langeoog). In 1955 he took up an invitation from consul Thomas Entz, a ship-owner from Flensburg, and went on a cruise across the Mediterranean to Algeria, Greece, Bulgaria and Turkey. In the museums of Paris (1939, 1958–1973) he came face to face with modern masterpieces. In Spain (1958–1967), Italy (1964–1971) and Ticino (1959, 1972) he was enthralled by nature and landscape.

His travel experiences find graphical expression in his travel diary (Germanic National Museum in Nuremberg) and his watercolour paintings: picturesque places, mountains, coastal landscapes, harbours with boats, fruits and flowers, but rarely humans. His pictures are influenced by his search for motifs typical of a country and they very often express his desire for colour and harmony. Particularly in his watercolour paintings Bredow increasingly discovered colour as a means to form his works, which are characterised by a combination of increased spontaneity and a rush of colour especially during his mature period. They show the tension between bright almost glowing colours and scarcely outlined forms. In his coloured chalk drawings and oil paintings Bredow explores abstracting representationalism, which is reminiscent of Werner Gilles' geometrical use of forms and Ernst Wilhelm Nay's abstract expressionism.

== Exhibitions (selection) ==
Bredow displayed his works only once in his lifetime (1954 participation in a group exhibition at the Kunstamt Berlin-Wilmersdorf). Not until his death did exhibitions of his works attract interest:

- 1976 Bremen, Bankhaus Martens und Weyhausen
- 1977 Worpswede, Galerie in der Lindenallee
- 1978 Nienburg, Museum der Stadt
- 1979 Berlin, Haus am Kleistpark
- 1991 Chemnitz, Städt. Kunstsammlungen
- 1991 Landsberg, Neues Stadtmuseum
- 1991 Meiningen, Staatl. Museen
- 1992 Halle, Staatl. Galerie Moritzburg
- 1992 Leipzig, Neuer Kunstverein
- 1993 Worpswede, Galerie Bollhagen
- 1993, Aschaffenburg, Galerie Will
- 1994 Ismaning, Galerie im Schloßpark
- 1994 Euskirchen, Rathausgalerie
- 1994 München, Kunstsalon Franke
- 1994 Salzburg, Galerie Kutscha
- 1994 Worpswede, Galerie Hubert
- 1994 Nürtingen, Galerie „Die Treppe“
- 1995 Berlin, Galerie Pfundt
- 1995 Würzburg, Galerie Hetzler
- 1995 Wiesbaden, Altstadtgalerie
- 1995 Lübeck, Galerie-Westenhoff
- 1996 München, Galerie im OSRAM-Haus

== Works of Art ==
Bredow's works of art are owned by Dresdner Bank, Leipzig; the municipal art collection Chemnitz; the Kunstmuseum Moritzburg Halle (Saale); the Vatican Rome. His written estate is kept at the archive for fine arts of the Germanic National Museum in Nuremberg.

== See also ==
- List of German painters
