= Lesher =

Lesher is a surname. Notable people with the surname include:

- Brian Lesher (born 1971), Belgian baseball player
- Dean Lesher (1903–1993), American newspaper publisher
- Edgar J. Lesher (1914–1998), American aircraft designer
- John Lesher (producer) (born 1966), American film producer
- John Vandling Lesher (1866–1932), American politician
- Michael Lesher (born 1951), American geologist
- Robert O. Lesher (born 1921), American judge
