= Frank Mallory =

Frank Mallory may refer to:

- Frank B. Mallory (chemist) (1932/33–2017), for whom the Mallory reaction is named
- Frank Burr Mallory (1862–1941), American pathologist for whom the Mallory body is named
- Frank F. Mallory, Canadian biologist
