= Hengen =

Hengen is a surname. Notable people with the surname include:

- Jean Hengen (1912–2005), Luxembourgish Roman Catholic priest
- Shannon E. Hengen, Canadian literary critic and academic
- Thomas Hengen (born 1974), German footballer

== See also ==
- Bengen
- Hentgen
