= Willet Green Miller =

Canadian geologist

- Born: Willet Green Miller; 1866; Norfolk County, Ontario, Canada
- Died: 1925 (aged 58–59)
- Education: BSc, University of Toronto, Toronto, Ontario, 1890; PhD, Heidelberg University
- Known for: Geologist who gave to Cobalt its name
- Awards: Gold medal from the Institute of Mining and Metallurgy of London (1915)
- Scientific career
- Fields: Geology
- Workplaces: Queen's University at Kingston

Willet Green Miller FRSC was a Canadian geologist and professor of Geology and Petrography (1893)

== Career ==
Birth in Norfolk County, Ontario, Canada in 1866.

Educated at Port Rowan High School.

Graduated from the University of Toronto in 1890 in Natural Science. Post-graduate work at Harvard, Chicago, and Heidelberg Universities in mapping for the Geological Survey.

Professor of Geology and Petrography of the Queen's University at Kingston in 1893.

Miller became the first provincial geologist for the province of Ontario in 1902.

== Achievements ==
He was the first to recognize the importance of the discoveries in Cobalt, at a time when no precious metals were being mined in northern Ontario.

== Honors ==
Gold medal from the Institute of Mining and Metallurgy of London in 1915.

== Memory ==
Willet G. Miller Medal has been established in his honor in 1941.

Miller Hall is named after Willet Green Miller in Queen's University at Kingston, Ontario, as is the Willet Green Miller Centre at Laurentian University in Sudbury.
