= Carlo Cattarello =

Canadian ice hockey player (1913–2008)

- Born: 1913; Cobalt, Ontario, Canada
- Died: June 29, 2008 (aged 95); Timmins, Ontario, Canada
- Occupations: Surveyor; Teacher; Columnist
- Known for: Minor hockey coach

Carlo Cattarello Sr., CM (1913 – June 29, 2008) was a corporal in the Canadian armed forces who served combat duty in the Second World War before playing and coaching minor league hockey. In 2001 he was honoured with membership in the Order of Canada, the highest civilian award in Canada, for his determination to bring sport to youths in remote communities.

== Personal life ==
Cattarello was born in Cobalt, Ontario in 1913 and grew up in Canada, Italy, England and the United States. He was married for 72 years to Mary Cattarello (née Barilko), cousin of hockey player Bill Barilko. They had two children, Sandra and Carlo Jr. In 1993, he received his Bachelor of Arts degree from Laurentian University in Sudbury after turning 80.

== Military career ==
Cattarello enlisted in the army in 1942 and saw combat in the Second World War with the 48th Highlanders as a corporal, serving for three years. He played on a gold-winning hockey team in Europe, with his fellow soldiers from Canadian Forces Base Petawawa including Toronto Maple Leafs goalie Walter "Turk" Broda.

== Hockey career ==
Cattarello played minor league hockey for the Sudbury Wolves, playing in the Memorial Cup in 1932. In the 1930s, Cattarello started coaching minor hockey including future National Hockey League players as Allan Stanley, Bill Barilko and Pete Babando. Cattarello is the namesake of the Most Valuable Player Trophy for the Northern Ontario Junior Hockey League and an arena in South Porcupine where he served as recreation director during the 1970s until he retired in 1980.

== Order of Canada ==
Cattarello was given the Order of Canada from Governor General Adrienne Clarkson for the time he spent coaching, fundraising and collecting equipment for youth sports Clarkson said, "His name resonates throughout communities in Northern Ontario and symbolizes volunteerism, fair play and sportsmanship".
