= Karen Hermeston =

First woman to serve as a combat photographer in the Canadian Army

Sergeant Karen Margaret Hermeston CD
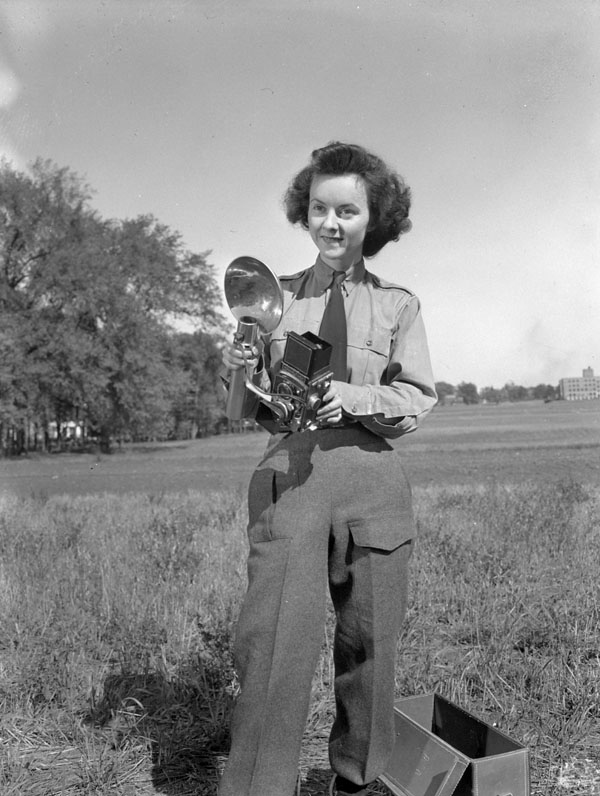
- Hermeston in October 1944, before deployment to Europe.
- Born: 1916
- Died: 2007 (aged 90–91)
- Military career
- Branch: Canadian Women's Army Corps
- Service years: 1941–1946
- Rank: Sergeant
- Nickname: Hermie
- Service number: W2115
- Unit: Canadian Army Film and Photo Unit
- Known for: Being the first female war photographer in the Canadian Army
- Other work: Photography teacher

Karen Margaret Andresen (née Hermeston; 1916–2007), better known as Karen Hermeston, was a Canadian photographer who served as the Canadian Army's first female war photographer during the Second World War.

== Early life ==
Hermeston was born in Ontario and raised in Englehart by parents Angus Melvin and Maren Hermeston. She had a brother, Douglas, who was born nine years later.

Hermeston studied commercial art and interior design for four years at the Ontario College of Art in Toronto (now OCAD University), though she had long been interested in photography as a discipline. She maintained a dark room at her parents' home in Englehart before and during the war. She was also a member of her college's student photography club.

=== Name ===
Though best known as Karen Hermeston in the press, Hermeston went by her middle name, Margaret, in civilian life. Her maiden name is sometimes recorded as Hermiston. While in the military, she was known by the nickname Hermie.

== Army career ==
In June 1941, nearly two years after Canada's entry into the Second World War, the Canadian Army created a unit tasked with documenting the country's war effort. The Canadian Army Film and Photo Unit (CFPU) was tasked with producing "informational and inspirational material" for the purposes of maintaining morale and boosting recruitment.

=== Domestic positions ===
Hermeston enlisted in the Canadian Women's Army Corps (CWAC) in October of the same year. She did not expect to receive a role involving photography, and was willing to perform any work the CWAC required. Her experience included drafting, shop-keeping, and tailoring, and she was assigned roles pertaining to all three before receiving an assignment in Ottawa as a drafter with the Canadian Military Engineers. She would remain in this role for seven months.

While in Ottawa, Hermeston spent her downtime taking photographs of her colleagues and CWAC day-to-day operations, having brought with her a Rollei camera. She also learned that the army maintained a public relations office, and inquired about joining. A brigadier wrote back that he could think of "14 good reasons" why women should not be allowed to become photographers. In response, Hermeston started saving her CWAC pay of 95 cents a day to buy a better camera. She also sent her photographs to magazines aimed at women, such as Chatelaine, and developed an extensive published portfolio in these publications.

In 1943, Hermeston successfully applied for an opening for a photographer in the public relations office. However, it would be a year before she was supplied with a press camera and the appropriate pay for an army press official. She also continued to send photographs to magazines. When the Montreal Standard featured a full spread of her photographs, depicting CWAC training camps, her superiors took note of her ability and assigned her to the CFPU.

=== Service overseas ===
In October 1944, Hermeston, now a sergeant, was sent to Europe. Her deployment, and status as the first woman to serve as an army photographer, attracted national news coverage at the time.

Although she was supposed to be stationed in France or Italy to photograph the conflict, Hermeston was initially held back in England after superiors there refused to send a woman to the front lines. Undeterred, Hermeston accepted a broad array of local assignments, ranging from photographing court-martials to documenting graves for the Graves Commission. She conducted her work using a Speedy Graphic camera.

By 1945, Hermeston was permitted to accompany war correspondents to CWAC posts around Europe, documenting their activities in places including Copenhagen and Brussels. She also completed assignments that commanding officers had initially restricted to her male colleagues, such as documenting war dead. One of her most well-known photographs taken in Europe during the war is a portrait of Molly Lamb Bobak, the first Canadian woman artist sent overseas by the military. As of 2026, some of Hermeston's photographs are preserved in a digitized collection by Library and Archives Canada.

Hermeston was among the Canadian personnel photographed celebrating Victory over Japan Day in Piccadilly Circus, London on August 10, 1945. In a well-publicized image, she is pictured being lifted by her colleagues. By the end of the war, Hermeston remained the sole woman in the CFPU, which contained 76 photographers in total.

== After the war ==
=== Marriage and family ===
Hermeston met a Norwegian pilot, Kris Andresen, during her work in Ottawa. The couple married while stationed in Europe and she took his last name. They returned to Canada in 1946, settling permanently in Sudbury. In 1957, they adopted a son named Andreas from Norway.

=== Career ===
Until the late 1970s, Hermeston was a staff photographer for the Ontario Department of Lands and Forests. In this role, she documented the actions of conservation officers and took pictures for the department's annual reports, as well as its journal, Sylva. Photographs taken by Hermeston in her role as a civil servant would feature in publications including outdoor recreation periodicals, and a 2007 book by Bryony Coles.

Shortly after the Mississagi Fire of 1948, Hermeston worked on a short film produced by the department to depict a salvage operation of timber damaged by the flames. As of 2026, the finished production, Out of the Smoke! (1950), is hosted on YouTube by the Archives of Ontario. Her work was also featured in two non-fiction books by writer and journalist Jack Hambleton: Hunter's Holidays (1947), and Fire in the Valley (1960).

Later in life, Hermeston also taught photography at Laurentian University. Until her death in 2007, she maintained a dark room at her home.
