= Stan Bharti =

Canadian businessman founder of Forbes & Manhattan

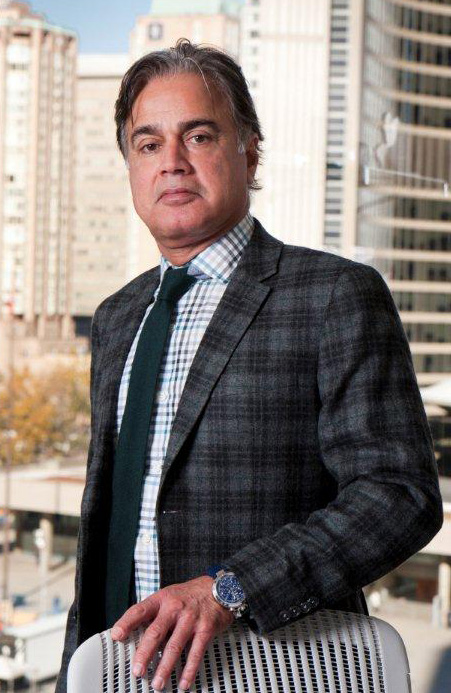
- Bharti in 2011
- Born: Punjab Region, India
- Education: Peoples' Friendship University of Russia (MSc); Imperial College London (MEng, D.I.C)
- Occupations: Chair, Forbes & Manhatta

Stan Bharti is a Canadian businessman, born and raised in the Punjab Region of India, who founded the merchant bank Forbes & Manhattan.

He started his own management and engineering consulting firm, BLM Inc., in 1988, and became the president of William Resources, which bought the Bjorkdal gold mine in Sweden and the Jacobina gold mine in Brazil. In 2002 Bharti established Forbes & Manhattan. He purchased mines from floundering companies, developed them and sold them. Since 2002, Forbes & Manhattan has developed companies almost exclusively in the mining sector.

In November, 2011, Bharti donated $10M to Laurentian University, where he gave lectures when he was a mining engineer in Sudbury. In exchange the engineering school was renamed the Bharti School of Engineering.
