= Lawrence Earl =

Canadian writer

- Born: Lawrence Earl Wiezel; April 29, 1915; Saint John, New Brunswick, Canada
- Died: April 5, 2005 (aged 89)
- Occupations: photojournalist, author, writer, magazine editor
- Spouse: Jane Armstrong
- Writing career
- Period: 1940–1990
- Notable works: Yangtse Incident, The Battle of Baltinglass, Crocodile Fever, She Loved a Wicked City

Lawrence Earl (April 29, 1915 – April 5, 2005), born Lawrence Earl Wiezel, was a Canadian photojournalist and author of several books. He is best known for Yangtse Incident, which was adapted into the 1957 film Yangtse Incident: The Story of H.M.S. Amethyst, and The Battle of Baltinglass, which won the 1953 Stephen Leacock Memorial Medal for Humour.

Born and raised in Saint John, New Brunswick, Earl worked as a journalist for the Montreal Standard, including a stint as a war correspondent and photojournalist in Europe during World War II. While working for the Standard, he met and married Jane Armstrong, who was herself one of Canada's first female war correspondents. In 1948, he published a photo essay, "Mending Dikes in the Netherlands", in National Geographic, and his photo of Queen Juliana was the model for a painting used on the cover of TIME. He wrote many articles for the British magazine Illustrated; and was a writer and editor for John Bull. He and Jane resided in London, England for 50 years, but often returned to Grand Bay–Westfield near Saint John in the summers.

While living in London, Earl published both novels and non-fiction books, including Yangtse Incident (1950), The Battle of Baltinglass (1952), Crocodile Fever (1954), The Frozen Jungle (1955), She Loved a Wicked City (1962), The Riddle of a Haunted River (1962), and Risk (1969).

Following his wife Jane's death, Earl created the Jane Armstrong Earl Fund through the Greater Saint John Community Foundation. He received an honorary doctorate from the University of New Brunswick in 2001.

He died on April 5, 2005, in Saint John.
