= Montreal Standard =

The Standard (Montreal)
- Type: Weekly pictorial
- Format: Broadsheet, tabloid
- Owner(s): Hugh Graham, John Wilson McConnell
- Founded: 1905
- Ceased publication: 1951

The Montreal Standard, later known as The Standard, was a national weekly pictorial newspaper published in Montreal, Quebec, founded by Hugh Graham. It operated from 1905 to 1951.

== History ==
The Standard began publishing in 1905 as a Saturday-only newspaper modelled on the Illustrated London News, a format that continued throughout World War I and World War II. Over time, the Standard reduced its size from broadsheet to tabloid, and it became more of a feature-oriented weekly, emphasizing feature writing, recipes, fiction, cartoons and, increasingly, illustrations and photographs over news items.

In 1925, Graham sold the paper, along with other media properties including the Montreal Star, to John Wilson McConnell. The Standard was available in Montreal as a free weekend supplement to the Montreal Star and nationally through subscription and newsstands and was a rival to the Toronto-based Star Weekly. In 1947, the Standard wooed away popular cartoonist Jimmy Frise from the Star Weekly, but as the Star Weekly retained the rights to the name of Frise's popular Birdseye Center comic strip, the cartoon was renamed Juniper Junction. Another comic strip, "Doug Wright's Family", was launched at the Standard in 1949.

In 1951, the Standard changed its publishing format and relaunched as the Weekend Picture Magazine (later simply the Weekend), which was distributed across Canada as a weekend supplement to local newspapers. As Weekend the publication focussed on feature writing, photography and comics and dropped the Standard's news and fiction components.

Notable contributors to the newspaper include Mavis Gallant, who was on staff as a feature reporter from 1944 to 1950, Lawrence Earl, who was a war correspondent and photojournalist for the paper during World War II, and Karen Hermeston, the Canadian Army's first female war photographer.

== See also ==
- List of newspapers in Canada
