= Hentgen =

Hentgen is a surname. Notable people with the surname include:

- Aloyse Hentgen (1894–1953), Luxembourgish politician
- Pat Hentgen (born 1968), American baseball player

== See also ==
- Hengen
