= Michael Lesher =

American geologist (born 1951)

Carl Michael Lesher (born 1951) is an American geologist. He is an authority on the geology and origin of nickel-copper-platinum group element deposits, especially those associated with komatiites and the Sudbury Impact Structure, their physical volcanology and localization, the geochemistry and petrology of associated rocks, and controls on their composition.

== Life, education, and career ==
Lesher was born in Indianapolis, Indiana, United States, but has been living and working in Canada beginning in 1975 and continuously since 1997. He holds BSc and MA degrees in geology from Indiana University Bloomington, where he was a member of Phi Delta Theta fraternity, rode in the Little 500 bicycle race in 1971 and 1972, and was on the IU water polo team in 1972 and 1973. Between 1975 and 1979, he worked as an Exploration Geologist and Mineralogist for the Iron Ore Company of Canada, before obtaining a PhD degree in geology from the University of Western Australia. Between 1982 and 1984, he was a Postdoctoral Research Fellow at the J. Tuzo Wilson Research Laboratories of the University of Toronto; and between 1984 and 1997, he was Professor of Economic Geology at the University of Alabama in Tuscaloosa. In 1997, he was appointed Professor of Economic Geology, NSERC Senior Industrial Research Chair in Mineral Exploration, and Founding Director of the Mineral Exploration Research Centre at Laurentian University in Sudbury, Ontario. In 2010-2011 he served as Director of Mining Initiatives, designing and founding the School of Mines (now Goodman School of Mines). He has been a Visiting Fellow in the Abteilung Geochemie at the Max Planck Institute für Chemie (1989 and 1991) and the Research School of Earth Sciences at the Australian National University (1990), an Honorary Professor at the Chengdu University of Technology (2000), and a visiting professor at Indiana University (2002–2003), and has given plenary, keynote, and invited lectures all over the world. In 2021 he was appointed Professor Emeritus at Laurentian University.

Between 1998 and 2002, Lesher was Leader of the International Union of Geological Sciences- and UNESCO-sponsored International Geological Correlation Program (now International Geoscience Programme) Project 427, Ore-Forming Processes in Dynamic Magmatic Systems. Between 2012 and 2018 he was Principal Investigator and Project Director of the $13M pan-Canadian Integrated Multi-Parameter Footprints of Ore Systems project, sponsored by the Natural Sciences and Engineering Research Council of Canada and the Canada Mining Innovation Council. He is currently a Co-Principal Investigator on the $100M Metal Earth program, sponsored by the Canada First Research Excellence Fund and the Northern Ontario Heritage Fund.

Lesher's scientific publications have been cited over 12,000 times, and he has served on the editorial boards of Mineralogical Abstracts (1987–1988), The Canadian Mineralogist (1989–1991), Reviews in Economic Geology (1993–1998), and Mineralium Deposita (2010–2016). In addition to his research, he has consulted for mining companies in Australia, Canada, Finland, and the USA.

== Honors and awards ==
Lesher has been awarded the Duncan R. Derry Medal (2007) from the Mineral Deposits Division of the Geological Association of Canada, and co-awarded the Julian Boldy Award (2002) by the Geological Association of Canada, and the Wardell Armstrong Prize (2009) by the Institution of Mining and Metallurgy. He has served as a Society of Economic Geologists Thayer Lindsley Visiting Lecturer (1998–1999) and as a Canadian Institute of Mining and Metallurgy University Lecturer (1997–1998). He is an elected Fellow of the Society of Economic Geologists, the Geological Society of America, and the Geological Association of Canada.

== Selected publications ==
- 2022, Wang Y, Lesher CM, Lightfoot PC, Pattison EF, Golightly JP, Genesis of Sublayer in the Sudbury Igneous Complex, Canada, Economic Geology, https://doi.org/10.5382/econgeo.4948
- 2019, Lesher CM, Up, down, or sideways: Emplacement of magmatic Ni-Cu ± PGE sulfide melts in Large Igneous Provinces, Canadian Journal of Earth Sciences (Special Issue on Large Igneous Provinces) volume 56, pages 756–773, http://doi.org/10.1139/cjes-2018-0177
- 2019, Lesher CM, Carson HJE, Houlé M, Genesis of chromite deposits by dynamic upgrading of Fe ± Ti oxide xenocrysts, Geology volume 47 (3): pages 207–210, https://doi.org/10.1130/G45448.1
- 2017, Lesher CM, Roles of residues/skarns, xenoliths, xenocrysts, xenomelts, and xenovolatiles in the genesis, transport, and localization of magmatic Fe-Ni-Cu-PGE sulfides and chromite, Ore Geology Reviews volume 90, pages 464–485, https://doi.org/10.1016/j.oregeorev.2017.08.008
- 2012, Burrows D, Lesher CM, Copper-rich magmatic Ni-Cu-PGE deposits, SEG Special Publication volume 16, pages 515–552, https://pubs.geoscienceworld.org/books/book/1385/
- 2011, Houlé M, Lesher CM, Komatiite-associated Ni-Cu-(PGE) mineralization in the Abitibi Greenstone Belt, Ontario. Reviews in Economic Geology volume 17, pages 89–121
- 2011, Layton-Matthews DM, Lesher CM, Liwanag J, Halden N, Burnham OM, Hulbert L, Peck DC, Keays RR, Mineralogy, geochemistry, and genesis of komatiite-associated Ni-Cu-(PGE) mineralization in the Thompson Nickel Belt, Manitoba. Reviews in Economic Geology volume 17, pages 123–143
- 2009, Lesher CM, Barnes SJ, Komatiite-Associated Ni-Cu-(PGE) Deposits, in C Li and EM Ripley (Editors), Magmatic Ni-Cu-PGE Deposits: Genetic Models and Exploration, Geological Publishing House of China, pages 27–101
- 2008, Arndt NT, Lesher CM, Barnes SJ, Komatiite, Cambridge University Press, Cambridge, 488 pages, ISBN 978-0-521-87474-8
- 2007, Lesher CM, Ni-Cu-(PGE) Deposits in the Raglan Area, Cape Smith Belt, New Québec, in Goodfellow, W.D. (Editor), Mineral Resources of Canada: A Synthesis of Major Deposit-types, District Metallogeny, the Evolution of Geological Provinces, and Exploration Methods, Geological Survey of Canada and Mineral Deposits Division of the Geological Association of Canada Special Publication, pages 351–386
- 2005, Arndt NT, Lesher CM, Czamanske GK, Mantle-derived magmas and magmatic Ni-Cu-(PGE) deposits, 100th Anniversary Volume, Society of Economic Geologists, pages 5–23
- 2002, Lesher CM, Keays RR, Komatiite-Associated Ni-Cu-(PGE) Deposits: Mineralogy, Geochemistry, and Genesis, in LJ Cabri (Editor), The Geology, Geochemistry, Mineralogy, and Mineral Beneficiation of the Platinum-Group Elements, Canadian Institute of Mining, Metallurgy and Petroleum, Special Volume 54, pages 579–617
- 2001, Lesher CM, Burnham OM, Multicomponent elemental and isotopic mixing in Ni-Cu-(PGE) ores at Kambalda, Western Australia. Canadian Mineralogist, volume 39, pages 421–446
- 1996, Stowell HH, Lesher CM, Green NL, Sha P, Sinha, K, Metamorphism and gold mineralization in the Blue Ridge, southernmost Appalachians. Economic Geology, volume 91, pages 1115–1144
- 1995, Lesher CM, Arndt NT, 1995, Trace element and Nd isotope geochemistry, petrogenesis, and volcanic evolution of contaminated komatiites at Kambalda, Western Australia. Lithos, volume 34, pages 127–157
- 1989, Lesher CM, Komatiite-associated nickel sulfide deposits, Reviews in Economic Geology volume 4, pages 45–101
- 1986, Lesher CM, Goodwin AM, Campbell IH, Gorton MP, Trace element geochemistry of ore-associated and barren felsic metavolcanic rocks in Superior Province, Canada. Canadian Journal of Earth Sciences volume 23, pages 222–237
- 1984, Lesher CM, Arndt NT, Groves DI, Genesis of komatiite-associated nickel sulphide deposits at Kambalda, Western Australia: A distal volcanic model, in Buchanan, D.L., Jones, MJ (Editors), Sulphide Deposits in Mafic and Ultramafic Rocks. Institution of Mining and Metallurgy, London, pages 70–80
