= Hans Orlowski =

German artist

- Born: 1 March 1894; Insterburg, East Prussia, Germany
- Died: 3 May 1967 (aged 73)
- Occupations: Woodcut artist, painter

Hans Orlowski (1 March 1894 – 3 May 1967) was a German woodcut artist and painter.

== Life ==
Hans Otto Orlowski was born at Insterburg, a midsized town a short distance to the east of Königsburg in East Prussia, which at that time was part of Germany. His father was a master tailor. While he was growing up his family relocated, initially to Königsburg and later to Potsdam (near Berlin), and then Charlottenburg.

Between 1911 and 1915 he undertook his artistic studies with Harold Bengen at the Training Academy of the Museum of Decorative Arts in Berlin. His studies were interrupted by the First World War (1914–1918). He served as a soldier in Serbia and was wounded early on. He was employed, from 1915, as a draftsman in the War Ministry. He produced his first linocuts in 1915 and his first woodcuts in 1916. He returned to art school in 1918, now studying under Philipp Franck, and obtaining his degree in 1919. In 1918 he was part of the Berlin Secession, an association of "alternative" artists.

Between 1921 and 1945 Orlowski taught at the Decorative Arts Academy at the Charlottenburg site, acquired through a merger of two arts training institutions in 1924. He was appointed a to a professorship in 1931. During these years he also created numerous woodcut images and illustrations. In 1924 he undertook a trip to Paris and turned away from Expressionism, to the point of personally destroying more than sixty of the paintings he had produced between 1920 and 1924. In 1934 Orlowski's first solo exhibition was presented at the Fritz Gurlitt gallery.

During the Second World War he involved himself in welfare work in the Berlin National Gallery. His workshop in the academy was bombed out: all the woodblocks and 65 paintings were destroyed. In 1945 his apartment was also destroyed through the impact of the war. 1945 was also the year in which the war ended, and he started teaching a course on murals and stained glass at the Berlin University of the Arts. Exhibitions in Munich, Linz and Würzburg followed. His last exhibition was held in Berlin in 1964.
