= Sheila Embleton =

Canadian-born British linguist

Sheila Embleton FRSC
- Born: 1954 (age 71–72); Ottawa, Ontario, Canada
- Spouse: Wolfgang Ahrens (m. 1981)
- Children: 1

Academic background
- Education: University of Toronto (Bsc., MSc., PhD)
- Thesis: Incorporating borrowing rates in lexicostatistical tree reconstruction (1982)

Academic work
- Institutions: York University

Sheila Margaret Embleton FRSC (born 1954) is a Canadian and British linguist. She is a Distinguished Research Professor of Linguistics at York University. Embleton is a Knight First Class of the Order of the White Rose of Finland.

== Career ==
Embleton joined the faculty at York University in 1980. She served various academic roles such as Undergraduate Program Director, Graduate Program Director, Associate Dean, and Vice-President Academic and Provost. As an Associate Dean, Embleton was awarded a Knight First Class of the Order of the White Rose of Finland. She also served as president of the Canadian Friends of Finland Education Foundation, where she led a campaign to create a Chair in Finnish Studies at the University of Toronto.

While in her role as vice-president academic and Provost, she helped create York's first-ever India strategy and eventually served as president of the Shastri Indo-Canadian Institute. Embleton also Chaired the Ontario Council of Academic Vice-Presidents and sat on the Board of the Ontario Universities Application Centre.

In 2010, Embleton was elected a Fellow of the Royal Society of Canada.

From January 2023 through March 2024 Embleton served as interim president of Laurentian University in Sudbury, Ontario, in the aftermath of the institution's financial crisis.

Embbleton subsequently served as interim president of Algoma University, effective 1 July 2025.

== Personal life ==
Embleton married Wolfgang Ahrens in 1981, but chose to keep her last name. When their daughter was born in 1989, she took Embleton's name.

== Selected publications ==
- Statistics in historical linguistics (1986)
- Names and Their Substitutes: Onomastic Observations on Astérix and Its Translations (1991)
- Lexicostatistics/glottochronology: from Swadesh to Sankoff to Starostin to future horizons (2000)
