= Willet Green Miller Centre =

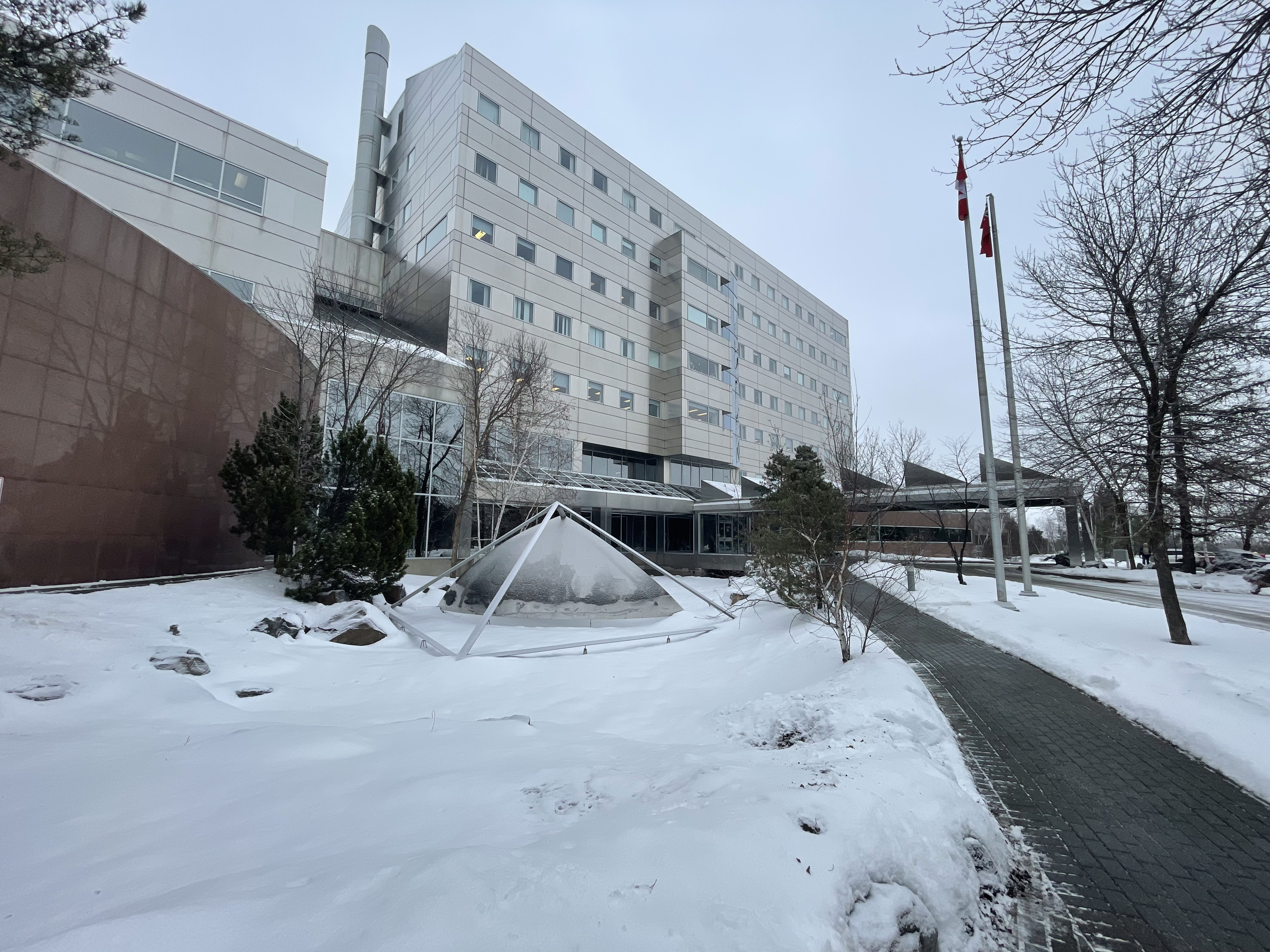
- Willet Green Miller Centre Exterior
- Interactive map of the Willet Green Miller Centre area

General information
- Location: Sudbury, Ontario, 933 Ramsey Lake Rd, Sudbury, ON P3E 6B5, Canada
- Coordinates: 46.4701°N 80.9743°W
- Completed: 1990
- Affiliation: Laurentian University Government of Ontario

Technical details
- Floor area: 316 652 sq. ft.

Design and construction
- Architecture firm: Bélanger Salach

The Willet Green Miller Centre is a multi-story research laboratory specializing in geological research and testing state-of-the-art geoscience technology. Established in 1990, The building houses many inter-governmental organizations relating to geoscience. The laboratory is located in Greater Sudbury, Ontario, Canada, off the shore of Lake Ramsey. The research laboratory was initially named the Mine & Mills Centre before being renamed the Willet Green Miller Centre after construction, in memory of pioneering Canadian geologist Willet Green Miller. The building is structured in three divisions due to its purpose as a scientific building that houses a variety of governmental subdivisions. The main function of the laboratory is to provide the scientists with an environment that accommodates both the researchers and their equipment.

== Site ==
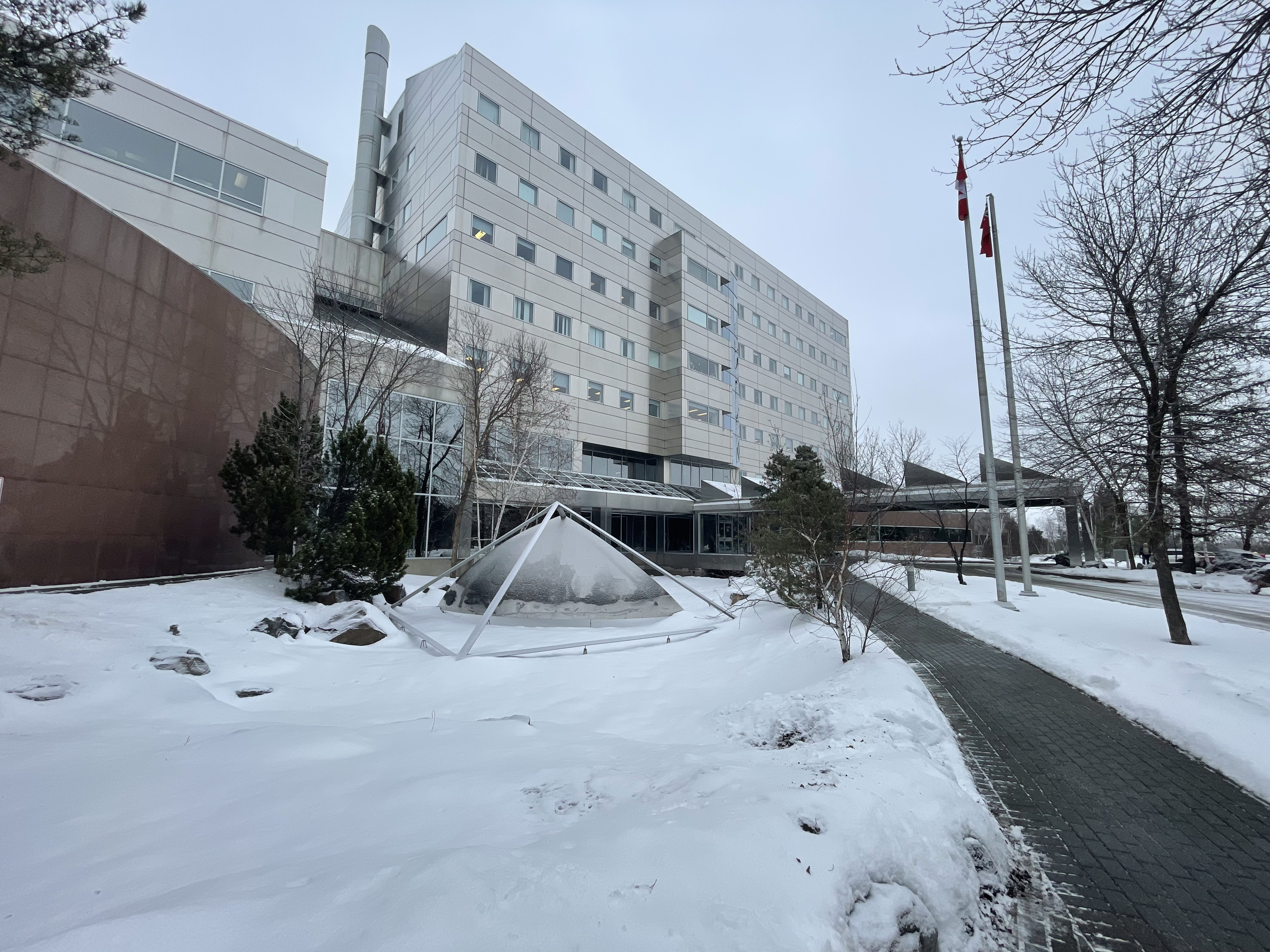
Willet Green Miller Centre Exterior

The Willet Green Miller Centre is located on the southwestern side of Lake Ramsey, on the main campus of Laurentian University. Visitors and Researchers enter the building through either the primary entrance on University Rd or the entrance on Ramsey Rd.

The surrounding area is part of Laurentian University's main campus and includes structures such as the Living with Lakes Ecology Centre, located directly on the lake's edge, and the Fraser Building, which follows University Rd.

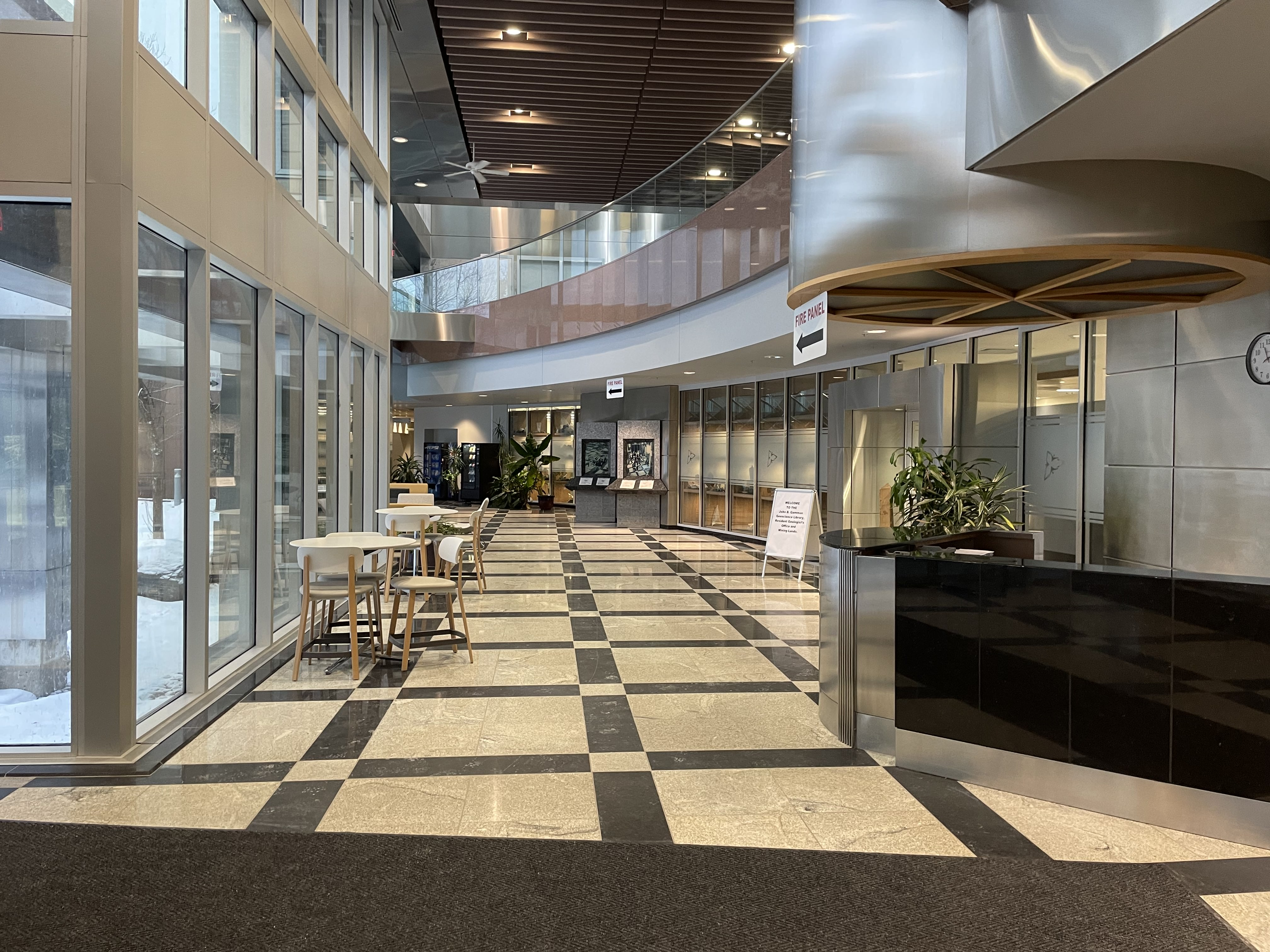
Lobby of Willet Green Miller Centre

== Architecture ==
The Willet Green Miller Centre was designed by Townend Stefura, Baleshta Nicholls Architects, now known as Belanger-Salach. The design team was composed of John Stefura, Rick Yallowega, Denis Comtois, Tony Niro, and Ted Matheson. John Stefura was the principal architect at the time with Rick Yallowega, a junior partner at the time but who would eventually become a principal architect, during the time of Nicholls Yallowega Bélanger Architects before it became Belanger-Salach Architects.

The structure consists of three structures, each having their own purpose. The centre structure supports the geologists' administrative offices, while the south is reserved for the scientists, equipping them with a state-of-the-art lab utilized for geological research. The third and final segment of the building is more industrial in nature. It houses a mine hoist rope testing facility, as that portion of the structure is prepared with specific qualities that mitigate the aftershock caused by the hoist rope’s failure.

=== Facade ===
The building is clad in stainless steel panels to reflect and symbolize the mining technologies of northern Ontario. Each panel weighs 360 lbs and is tig-welded to the steel stud frame behind the panels to not show any fasteners or marks left by the machine. The machine was required to be carefully calibrated as a challenge with using pure stainless steel panels was that if the charge was too high, the panels would show dimples and marks. If the charge was too low, the weld wouldn't hold and would eventually fail, causing the heavy panel to fall.

== History ==
The Ontario Government commissioned various research buildings for northern Ontario, as they wanted to move many of the laboratories out of Toronto and into the north. The Sudbury location was explicitly chosen as Sudbury was already a mining town at the time and thus had access to many geological elements. The commission was for five buildings in total located all over Ontario.

The architects toured all across North America, researching and gathering inspiration. One such building that was case-studied by the design team was the Salk Institute for Biological Studies.

In 2004 Laurentian University received 2,528600 From the NOHFC ( Northern Ontario Heritage Fund Corporation), to relocate the department of earth sciences into Willet Green Miller Centre.

=== Construction ===
Construction was completed in 1990, focusing on northern materials such as the two different types of granite used in the building being sourced from a local quarry.

The building was inspired by multiple existing research laboratories whose design principles were reused in the Willet Green Miller Centre. In between each floor lays an interstitial mechanical floor to support & service the scientific equipment for every other floor, allowing each floor to receive the power and support required for the powerful machinery required for advanced analysis.

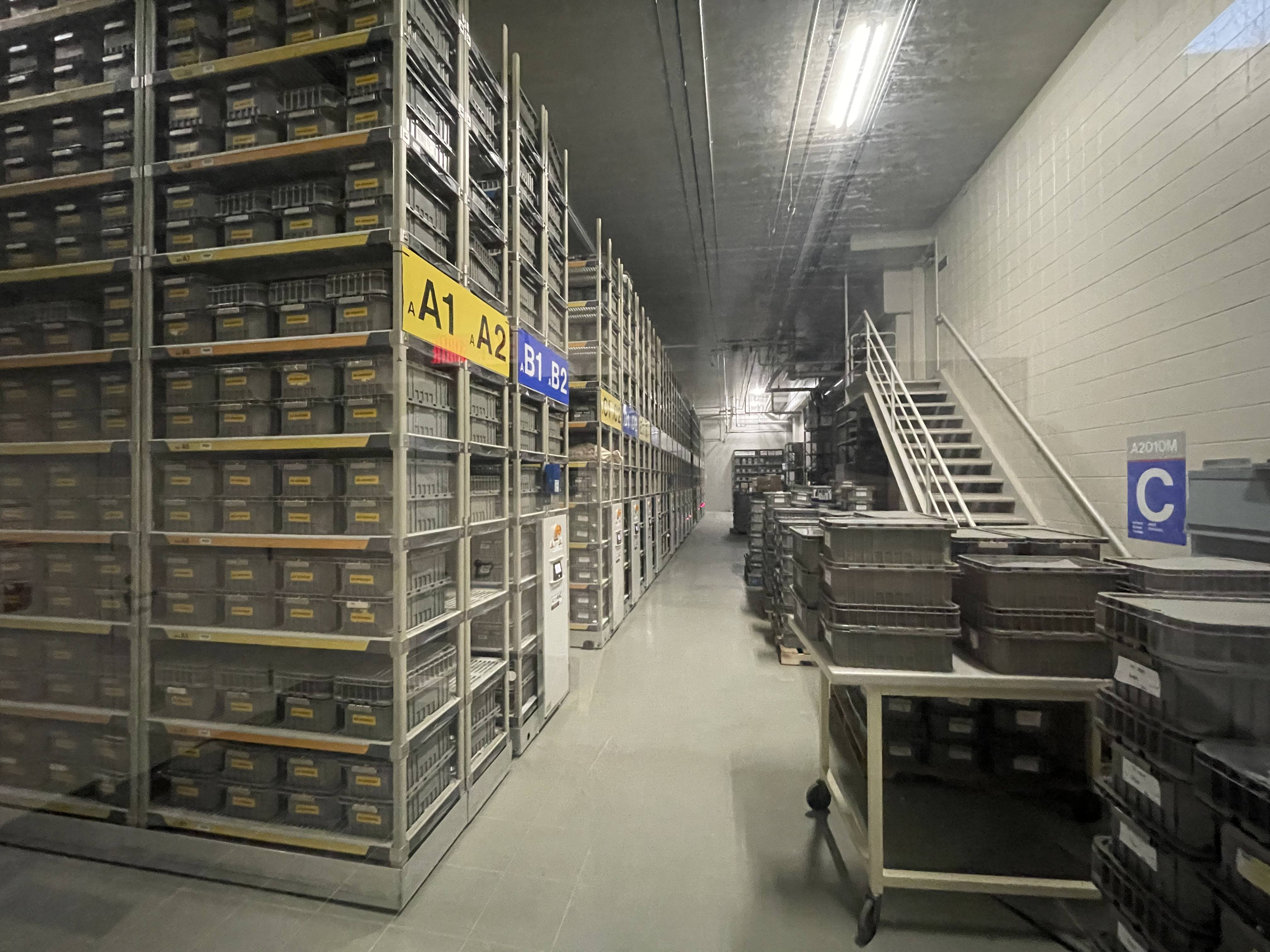
Samples Storage Room Willet Green Miller Centre

=== Mine hoist rope testing facility ===
The building features a mine hoist rope testing facility, designed to take a cable to absolute failure. The facility places such an immense amount of tension on the rope, that when it fails, the kinetic energy produced is strong enough to shake the earth around the site as the energy would be channelled into the rock beneath the Willet Green Miller Centre. To combat this, a large inertia block foundation was implemented into the design to mitigate the vibrations channelled into the rock.

==== Early years ====
Incident After Construction: Due to a wind vortex created by the structure, one of the 360lb stainless steel panels became loose on the frame and fell off the frame. This was caused by that specific panel not being tightened enough during construction, which, coupled with the wind vortex, caused the panel to loosen and eventually fall. This resulted in a complete re-test of every panel and multiple wind-tests being re-done.

=== Present ===
Currently, The Willet Green Miller Centre hosts many organizations and events and is also home to the recently founded Harquail School of Earth Sciences. The organizations located within the laboratory are the following:

- Mining Research Organization
- Harquail School of Earth Sciences
- Geoscience Laboratory
- Centre for Excellence in Mining Innovation (CEMI) (Formerly)

== Graduates ==
The Harquail School of Earth Sciences has produced many Graduates who have contributed significantly to the field. The students include but are not limited to: Ashley Kirwan: President & CEO of Orix Geoscience, Dr. Elizabeth Turner: Renowned Professor of Geoscience at Laurentian University & Geological Consultant, Dr. Nadia Mykytczuk: President & CEO of MIRARCO, Executive Director of Goodman School of Mines at Laurentian University.
