= Drummond Report =

Advisory report on debt reduction in Ontario

The Drummond Report is a nickname given to a deficit-reduction report written by economist Don Drummond. Released on February 15, 2012, around great hype, the report is intended to advise the government of Ontario on how to reduce the province's debt levels - the highest for any province in Canada.

== Background ==
Due to the Great Recession, the loss of manufacturing jobs and downturn in revenue, and the increase in government expenditures, Ontario's deficit was projected by mid-February 2012 to reach $16 billion by the time of the March budget, adding to a debt already in excess of $240 billion. Debt serving charges alone cost the province $10 billion every year. The increase in debt culminated in December 2011 when credit rating agency Moody's changed its assessment of Ontario's economic outlook from 'stable' to 'negative'.

To help reduce the level of debt, in 2011 the Ontario government - a Liberal administration led by Dalton McGuinty - commissioned economist Don Drummond to lead a four-person commission investigating how the government could reduce its deficit.
