= Harold Bengen =

German painter

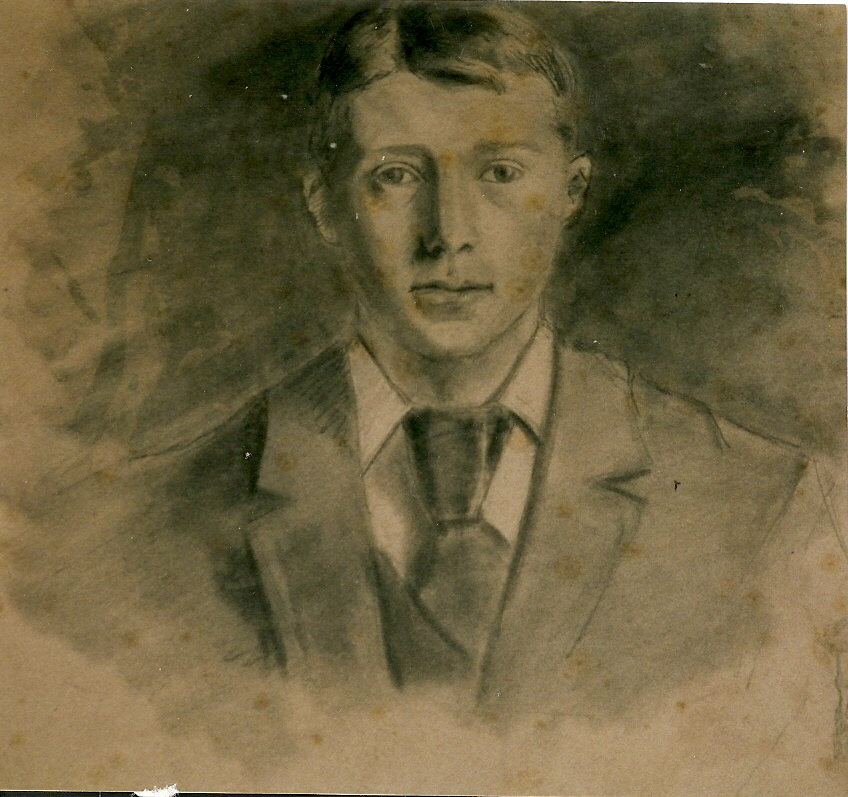
Harold Bengen: Self-portrait ca 1900

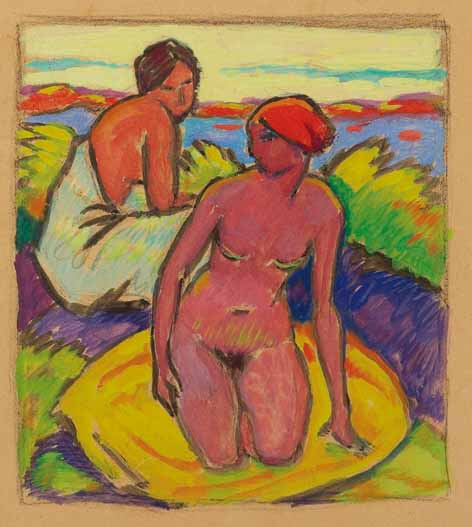
Harold Bengen: "Akt und Halbakt" ("Naked and semi-naked") ca 1905

Harold Bengen (6 January 1879 – 21 March 1962) was a German artist and art teacher. His earlier works can be seen as part of the Classical-modernist movement.

== Life ==
Harold Tronson Bengen was born in Hanover, one of his parents' four children, during the early years of the German Empire. His father was a pharmacist specialising in animal medicines. His mother, born ___ Tronson, was his father's second wife. She was an educator, originally from England, who had met his father while visiting Hanover and married him. Till 1914 Harold Bengen used the name "Harold T Bengen", with the "T" standing for Tronson.

Harold Bengen attended the Humanities Gymnasium (secondary school) in Hanover, where he received instruction in drawing from Ernst Jordan while still a schoolboy. In 1896 he moved on to the Weimar Arts Academy where he was taught by Carl Frithjof Smith. During 1898 and 1899 he pursued his studies in Graz, after which he returned home and worked in Hanover as a free-lance artist. During the years directly after 1905, which his when he met his future wife, Emmy, he became particularly prolific.

In 1908 he took a position teaching drawing and decorative art at the Arts and Crafts Academy in Berlin-Charlottenburg. Two years later, together with Georg Tappert and Max Pechstein, he was a co-founder of the New Secession artists' group. In 1920 he participated in the Berlin Secession exhibition. This was also the year in which he was given a professorship by the Berlin Arts and Crafts Academy. His students over the years included Hans Orlowski, Rudolf Bredow, Hannah Höch and Nikolaus Sagrekov. By now he had embarked on a parallel career as a costume designer, and in the early 1920s he designed the costumes and stage sets for a production by Max Reinhardt at the Deutsches Theater of The Merchant of Venice. He also involved himself in the design of mosaics and stained glass windows. In 1928 he undertook an extensive tour of South America which gave rise to a succession of water colours and pastel drawings.

During the 1930s he continued with his teaching work, while the focus his own work switched to portraiture and contract work. Later in the 1930s a picture he painted of a woman was included in the Nazis' Great German Art Exhibition in Munich. This and similar works such as the ceiling painting at the National Bank in Berlin and a proposal (never built) for the Tannenberg Memorial stand in crass contrast to his earlier artistic approach. During the war, which broke out in the later summer of 1939, Bengen relocated from Berlin to Holzhausen am Ammersee in Upper Bavaria. In 1952 he moved again, this time to Hamburg, where two of his three daughters were already living, and where in 1962 he died.

After 1945 the reputation which Harold Bengen had built up before 1933 was forgotten, and he was for many purposes airbrushed out of history because of the extent to which he had been willing to compromise with the dictatorship.

== Works ==
Bengen's early work contains elements of Jugendstil (corresponding in some ways to "Art nouveau"). His artistic offering is much taken up with presentations of women. His most original and personal works - often using strong colours - date from the decade before the First World War. Much of his contribution to teaching is acknowledged in biographical works concerning his former pupils, while much of his own later artistic output was destroyed by the Second World War. Most of the earlier works, however, including many from the 1920s, survived undisturbed in a cellar until after the death of Bengen's widow, at which point, through the efforts of his three daughters, they again saw the light of day. Some were exhibited early in the twenty-first century as part of an exhibition featuring the "Hiddensee" artists' colony, and have subsequently returned in force to the catalogues of the art dealers.
