= Shannon E. Hengen =

Shannon E. Hengen is a literary critic and professor of Canadian and women's literature at Laurentian University, Ontario, Canada where she formerly served as chairperson for the Department of English. Her specialities include dramatic comedy, aboriginal theatre, contemporary feminist writing, and Margaret Atwood. The theory that most informs her work involves performance, carnival, and gender. The aspect of literary style that most concerns her is voice, and the theme that most intrigues her at present is marriage. She has written or edited numerous books.

In 2007, Laurentian University's Presidential Advisory Committee on the Status of Women honoured her during its annual awards ceremony to celebrate International Women's Day, for her championing of women's literature.

== Selected publications ==
- Comedy's Edge. Vol. 1 Toronto: Playwrights Union of Canada, 1999. 77 pp.
- Comedy's Edge. Vol. 2 Toronto: Playwrights Union of Canada, 1999. 77 pp.
- "Margaret Atwood's Power: Mirrors, Reflections, and Images" in Select Fiction and Poetry. Toronto: Second Story, 1993.

== Books edited ==
- Friedman, T.; Hengen, Shannon and Wilson, Sharon (eds); Approaches to Teaching Atwood's The Handmaid's Tale and Other Works. New York: Modern Language Association, 1996.
- Hengen, Shannon (Ed.); Performing Gender and Comedy: Theories, Texts, and Contexts. Amsterdam: Gordon and Breach, 1998. 279 pp.

== Chapters in academic books ==
- "Strange Visions: Atwood’s Interlunar and Technopoetics." Margaret Atwood’s Textual Assassinations: Recent Poetry and Fiction. Ed. Sharon Rose Wilson. Columbus: The Ohio State UP, 2003. 42-53.
- "Margaret Atwood's Nature." the Handmaid's Tale, Roman protéen. Ed. Jean- Michel Lacroix, Jacques Leclaire, et jack Warwick. Publications de l'Université de Rouen, France, 1999. 77-84.
- "Dialogic Time and The Handmaid's Tale." The Handmaid's Tale: Margaret Atwood. Ed. Marta Dvorak. Paris: Ellipses, 1998 144-8.
- "Unofficial Lives: Performance of Self and Others in Women's Comic Monologues." La Création biographique/Biographical Creation. Ed. Marta Dvorak. Rennes, France: Presses Universitaires de Rennes, 1997. 59-65.
- "Zenia's Foreignness." Various Atwoods: Essays on the Later Poems, Short Fiction, and Novels. Ed. Lorraine M. York. Toronto: House of Anansi Press, 1995, 271-286.

== Articles ==
- "The De-ba-jeh-mu-jig Method: Making Stories." Canadian Theatre Review 115 (Summer 2003): 35-8.
- "An Interview with Garry Hynes," Canadian Journal of Irish Studies 26.2 (Fall 2000)/27.1 (Spring 2001): 74-83.
- "First Tellers of Tales." Canadian Theatre Review 106 (Spring 2001): 35-8.
- "Towards a Feminist Comedy." Canadian Literature 146 (Autumn 1995): 97-109.
- "Theatre du Nouvel-Ontario and Francophone Culture in Sudbury, Ontario, Canada." The American Review of Canadian Studies 21.1 (1991): 55-69.
- "'Metaphysical Romance'" Atwood's PhD Thesis and The Handmaid's Tale." Science-Fiction Studies 18 (1991): 142-144.
