= Frank F. Mallory =

Frank F. Mallory is a professor of biology at Laurentian University in Sudbury, Ontario. In 2018 he is the Chair of the biology department. Mallory's research deals mainly with mammals.

== Early life and education ==
Mallory studied at Laurentian University, earning a B.Sc. and later an M.Sc.. He completed his doctorate at the University of Guelph.

== Career ==
In the 1980s, as an assistant professor at Wilfrid Laurier University, Mallory studied the behaviour of rodents, including lemmings, and wrote about intraspecies violence and reproductive strategies. His work confirmed that lemmings do not deliberately run off cliffs.

In 2002 Mallory took the post as Chair of the biology department at Laurentian University.

Mallory studied population distribution and migration patterns of predators and their prey in northern Ontario, including wolves, moose and cougars. He is often quoted in the media about animal behaviour following unusual sightings of wild animals in urban settings.

More recently Mallory's research has expanded to include biological aspects of human sexuality. In 2013 Mallory received a grant from the Canadian government Grand Challenges program to work with researchers at Khon Kaen university in Thailand to develop a treatment for liver fluke disease. While in Thailand he also gave lectures about disease prevention to the general public.
