= Laurentian University =

Bilingual university in Ontario, Canada

Laurentian University of Sudbury
- Other names: LU, LUL
- Motto: Emitte lucem et veritatem
- Motto in English: Send forth thy light and thy truth
- Type: Public
- Established: March 28, 1960
- Academic affiliations: ACUFC, COU, CVU, Universities Canada
- Endowment: CA$52.8 million
- Chancellor: Kristan Straub
- President: Lynn Wells
- Location: 935 Ramsey Lake Road; Sudbury, Ontario; P3E 2C6; 46°27′57.75″N 80°58′13.77″W
- Campus: urban green belt, 304 ha (750 acres)
- Sport Teams: Laurentian Voyageurs
- Colours: Gold & blue
- Nickname: Voyageurs
- Sporting affiliations: U Sports, OUA
- Mascot: Victor the Voyageur
- Website: laurentian.ca

Laurentian University (French: Université Laurentienne), officially Laurentian University of Sudbury, is a mid-sized bilingual public university in Greater Sudbury, Ontario, Canada, incorporated on March 28, 1960. Laurentian offers a variety of undergraduate, graduate-level, and doctorate degrees. Laurentian is the largest bilingual provider of distance education in Canada. The university was formerly federated with Thorneloe University, Huntington University, and the University of Sudbury. Laurentian severed the federation during 2021 insolvency proceedings, ending 60-year relationships, and triggering lawsuits.

== Overview ==
The university's campus is located on the south side of Ramsey Lake in the Bell Grove neighbourhood, just south of Greater Sudbury's downtown core. The city's Idylwylde golf course borders on the university campus to the west and the Lake Laurentian Conservation Area borders on the campus to the south. The Lake Laurentian Conservation Area contains a network of trails used for running, mountain biking and Nordic skiing.

The school has three separate student unions. The Association des étudiantes et étudiants francophones (AEF) serves the francophone students in undergraduate programs. The Students' General Association (SGA) serves mainly the anglophone students in undergraduate programs. The Graduate Students' Association (GSA) serves all students in graduate programs.

== History ==
Laurentian's historical roots lie in the Roman Catholic church. The Collège du Sacré-Coeur was founded by the Society of Jesus in 1913. According to a plaque at the entrance to the R. D. Parker Building, the school began granting degrees in 1957 as the University of Sudbury. A university federation combining representatives from the Roman Catholic, United, and Anglican churches was incorporated as a "non-denominational, bilingual institution of higher learning" in 1960. The new Laurentian University held classes in the University of Sudbury facility, as well as in a variety of locations in the city, including the Sudbury Steelworkers Hall, until its current campus was opened in 1964. The federated colleges included Huntington College (United Church), University of Sudbury College (Roman Catholic, descended from the Collège du Sacré-Coeur), and Thorneloe College (Anglican) which joined in 1963. Former federated schools affiliated with Laurentian include Collège universitaire de Hearst in Hearst, Nipissing University College in North Bay, and Algoma University College in Sault Ste. Marie.

In 2013, Laurentian launched the McEwen School of Architecture.

In 2020, Laurentian lost a lawsuit under the Freedom of Information and Protection of Privacy Act (FIPPA), that sought to keep the salary of senior executives confidential.

On February 1, 2021, Laurentian University President Robert Haché confirmed that the University had filed for creditor protection. Court filings revealed that the university's liabilities amounted to CA$321 million. As part of its restructuring, the university ended its relationships with the federated schools. Two of the federated schools filed lawsuits against Laurentian which were unsuccessful. On April 12, 2021, Laurentian University announced the closure of 58 undergraduate programs and 11 graduate programs spanning a diversity of subjects. As part of these closures, 116 faculty positions were terminated. In November 2022, the Auditor General of Ontario released a report on the university's insolvency, finding that overspending on large capital projects starting in 2010 were the primary cause. It also found that the school should have sought provincial help before invoking the Companies' Creditors Arrangement Act, which is designed for private companies, not public institutions.

In March 2022, Ontario's deputy ombudsman and French language services commissioner, Kelly Burke, released a report on the university's cuts to French-language programs during its restructuring, finding that it failed to meet its obligations under the French Language Services Act. In response, francophone community groups have demanded the transfer of Laurentian University's remaining French-language academic programming to a stand-alone French-language university.

== Administration ==
The Board of Governors heads the university with the president. Directly to the left and right of the president is the assistant to the president, and the Laurentian University senate.

Aline Chrétien, the wife of former Canadian Prime Minister Jean Chrétien, was named the university's first chancellor on September 22, 2010. In 2013, she was succeeded by Steve Paikin, who resigned in 2021 when the university sought creditor protection.

=== Presidents ===
- Père Émile Bouvier s.j. (1960-1961)
- Harold Bennett (1961-1963)
- Stanley G. Mullins (1963–1970)
- R.J.A. Cloutier (Acting President) (1970–1972)
- Edward J. Monahan (1972–1977)
- Henry Best (1977–1984)
- John Daniel (1984–1989)
- Charles H. Bélanger (Acting President) (1989-1991)
- Ross Paul (1991–1998)
- Geoffrey Tesson (Acting President) (1998)
- Jean Watters (1998–2001)
- Hermann Falter (Acting President) (2001-2002)
- Judith Woodsworth (2002–2008)
- Robert Bourgeois (Acting President) (2008-2009)
- Dominic Giroux (2009–2017)
- Pierre Zundel (Interim President) (2017–2019)
- Robert Haché (2019–2022)
- Tammy Eger (Interim President) (2022)
- Sheila Embleton (Interim President) (2022–2024)
- Lynn Wells (2024–present)

== Program information ==
University rankings

World rankings
- USNWR World: 1405

Canadian rankings
- USNWR National: 34
- Maclean's Undergraduate: 15

=== Commerce and administration ===
Laurentian's school of commerce and administration was founded in 1960. It is modeled on the University of Western Ontario's Richard Ivey School of Business. The School of Management offers a wide variety of programs, from MBAs to honours degrees in Business Administration and Sports Administration (H.B.Comm in SPAD).

==== Sports Administration (H.B.Comm in SPAD) ====
Laurentian's Sports Administration program is the only undergraduate sport management program in Canada that offers a business degree. In recent years, the program has achieved international accreditation which allows for more international opportunities. These opportunities include a two-week course in China, a semester abroad in Austria or France, International destinations for the final consulting trip, as well as many international internship opportunities.

=== Education (B.Ed.) ===
Laurentian has both English and French language education programs for teacher training.

==== École des sciences de l'Éducation (Consecutive Education, French) ====
In the Alphonse Raymond building, at the east end of campus, is the school École des sciences de l'éducation de l'Université Laurentienne. Named after Father Alphonse Raymond, and opened in 1974, the building houses classrooms, a cafeteria, an auditorium, a small gymnasium, and offices for more than a dozen professors, offering a variety of programs. The school offers a traditional consecutive post-grad Bachelor of Education and a newer concurrent Bachelor of Arts Education degree that can be taken full or part-time.

==== School of Education (Concurrent Education, English) ====
In September 2003, Laurentian began offering an English Bachelor of Education. This concurrent B.Ed. is a five-year program taken at the same time — concurrently — with an undergraduate degree commonly in Arts, Sciences or Sport and Physical Education. The primary goal of the English-language Bachelor of Education program is to foster the development of a new generation of reflective educators who employ holistic teaching approaches. The curriculum features an emphasis on equity and diversity as well as the infusion of Indigenous issues and content. At the moment, the program is offered in just two of the three areas of potential concentration: the primary/junior and junior/intermediate divisions. A new School of Education building - based on sustainable environmental principles and located across from L'École des sciences at the east end of the campus – was completed in the summer of 2008. The program requires a 75% average over one's first four years in order to progress to the final (or Pro Year). The 75% minimum average required for entry in the final year means a nearly 80% entering grade in reality, so the annual Pro Year class (ranging from about 65 to 95 students) constitutes a rather elite cohort compared to most other Ontario concurrent programs. Many graduates have gone on to employment with both the local Sudbury boards, with other school boards across Ontario, while many others have acquired employment in Alberta, B.C., and Saskatchewan, with a significant number working overseas (particularly in Britain).

== Partnerships ==
Located in a city where the major industry is mining, Laurentian has strong ties with the mining industry, and offers a program in mining engineering. The Willett Green Miller Centre, a provincial building located on campus, houses the Mining Innovation, Rehabilitation and Applied Research Corporation (MIRARCO), a not-for-profit applied research and technical service company formed through collaboration between Laurentian University and the private and public sectors, and the Mineral Exploration Research Centre (MERC), a semi-autonomous research and teaching centre whose focus is field-based, collaborative research on mineral deposits and their environments.

The university is a member of L'Association des universités de la francophonie canadienne, a network of academic institutions of the Canadian Francophonie.

On April 1, 2021, Laurentian terminated its federation agreement with Huntington University, Thorneloe University and the University of Sudbury as part of the CCAA process.

Laurentian's Bachelor of Science in Nursing program is taught in colleges across Ontario as part of one of three agreements between colleges and the university. Graduates of these collaborate programs receive Laurentian degrees upon graduation. The Northeastern Ontario Collaborative Nursing Program (NEOCNP) is a partnership between Laurentian University, Cambrian College, Northern College, and Sault College. St. Lawrence College offers Laurentian's Nursing Program through an agreement called the Laurentian–St. Lawrence Collaborative Nursing Program. Finally, Collège Boréal provides the Nursing program through an agreement with Laurentian University's French-language "sciences infirmières" program.

Laurentian opened a campus in Barrie, Ontario, in 2001 in partnership with Georgian College. The university shut down its Barrie operations in 2019. In 2005, Laurentian and Lakehead University jointly launched the Northern Ontario School of Medicine. However In 2021, the provincial government passed legislation severing the medical school's ties with Laurentian and Lakehead, making it an independent university and Canada's first stand-alone medical school.

== Student life ==
'Demographics of student body (2015–16)
	Undergraduate	Graduate
Male	37.5%	35.1%
Female	62.5%	64.9%
Canadian student	94.5%	87.3%
International student	5.5%	12.7%

=== Students' General Association/Association Générale des Étudiants ===
The SGA-AGÉ is the largest student union at Laurentian. It offers services in both English and French. The association is presided over by a board of directors.

In 2016, the SGA-AGE became a member of the Ontario Undergraduate Student Alliance.

=== Association des étudiantes et étudiants francophones/Francophone Students Association ===
The AEF is the second undergraduate student union at Laurentian. Dissatisfied with the status of the French language within the SGA-AGÉ in the early 1970s, francophone students created the AEF in 1974 to better advocate for French-language rights within the university community and beyond. Since then, it has gained representation on the university's senate and board of governors as well as on several committees, in particular those relating directly to French-language academic programs and services.

The AEF offers services to its members typical of student unions, such as health and dental plans, a transit pass, and general support, while offering culturally and linguistically activities and programming reflecting their membership.

=== Media ===
The university's campus radio station, CKLU-FM, broadcasts at 96.7 MHz on the FM band in both English and French. Its campus newspapers are Lambda in English and L'Orignal déchaîné ("The Unchained Moose") in French. Lambda is a member of Canadian University Press, and CKLU is a member of the National Campus and Community Radio Association.

=== Sports ===
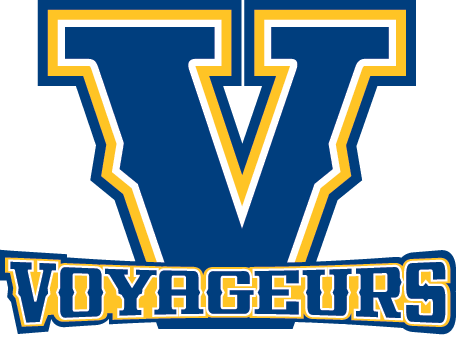
Laurentian Voyageurs logo

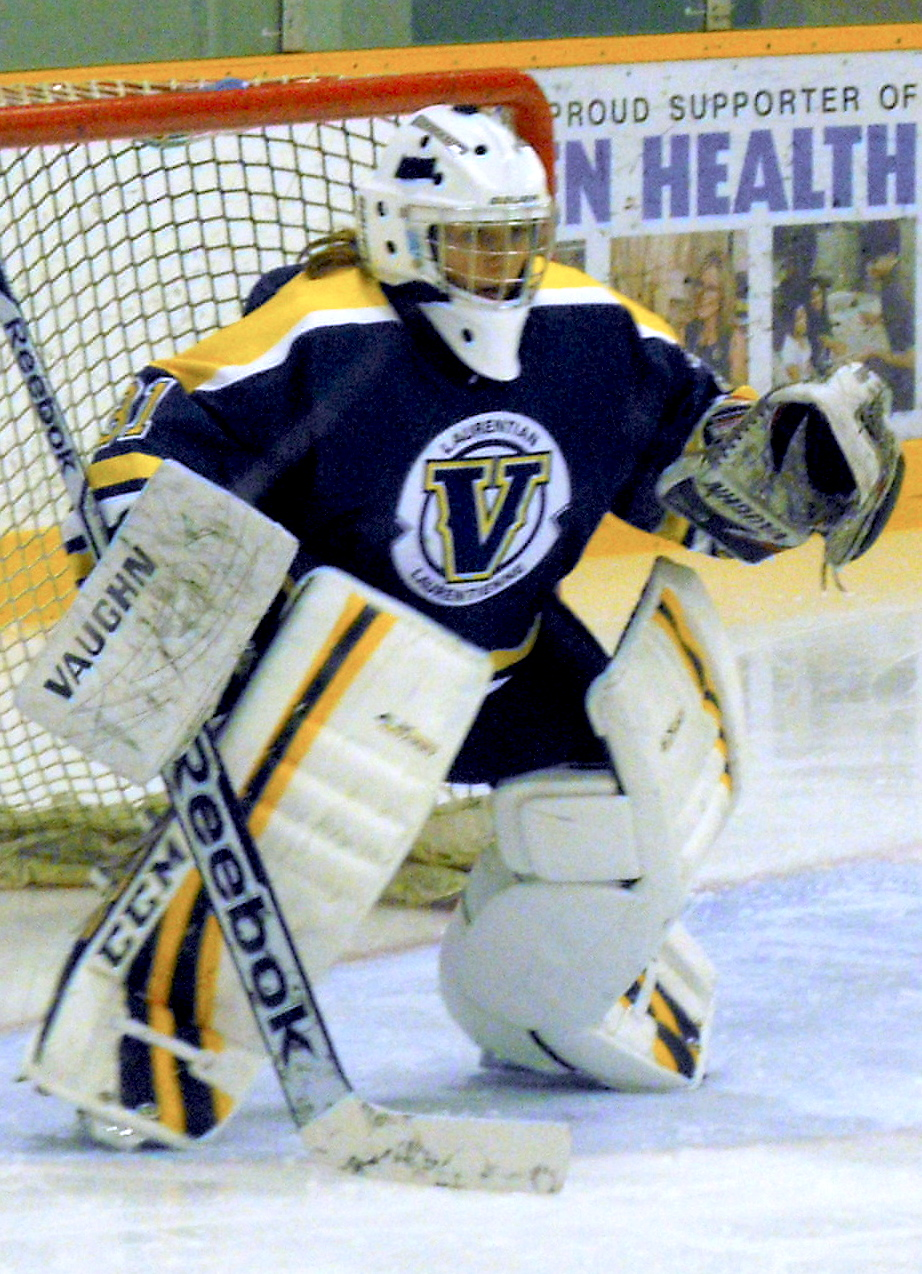
Voyageurs' women's hockey team 2013–14

The university's varsity teams, known as the Voyageurs, compete in basketball, soccer, rowing, cross country running, golf, curling, and Nordic skiing. There are also competitive club teams, including lacrosse and baseball, and a plethora of intramural sports programmes. The women's basketball team have been one of the most successful in the history of the U Sports Women's Basketball Championship, winning the title seven times. Notable alumnae of the basketball team include broadcaster Sylvia Sweeney. The varsity rowing team within its five-year history has produced a national team athlete and captured medals at both the OUA championships as well as gold medals at the Canadian University Rowing Championships.

In 2017, the women's varsity curling team captured the OUA Curling Championship (the first for the program and first OUA team banner for the University since 2003) followed by the Curling Canada/U Sports Championship (the first for the program and first U Sports team banner for the University since 1991). The Voyageurs' women's team followed-up their 2017 U Sports' victory with a second national U Sports title during the 2018–19 curling season. The team has since captured an additional U Sports bronze medal in 2023 and a second OUA Curling Championship in 2024.

The director of the athletic department is Peter Hellstrom.

==== 705 Challenge Cup ====
First established as a challenge between the varsity soccer teams of two Northern Ontario universities (Laurentian vs. Nipissing), in which the winning team was awarded the Riley Gallo Cup, the rivalry expanded. Introducing the 705 Challenge Cup in 2016, the results of all regular season games between the Lakers and the Voyageurs varsity teams for men's and women's basketball, ice hockey and soccer, comprised the overall won-loss record in determining the annual Cup winner. The Lakers would win their first 705 Challenge Cup during the 2019-20 athletics season.

== Campus ==
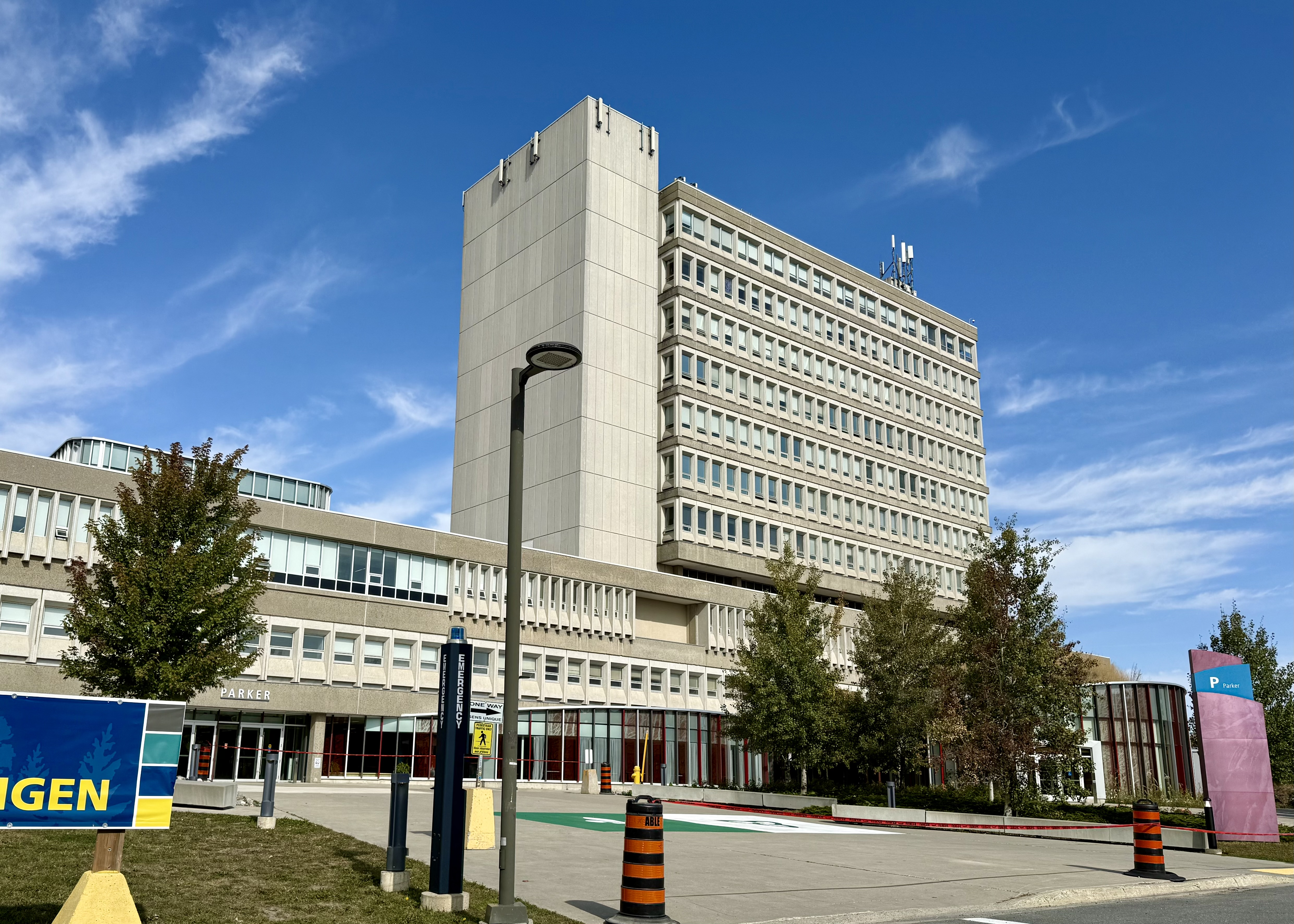
The R.D. Parker Building

=== Fraser Auditorium ===
The Fraser Auditorium in the Fraser Building is a large-volume auditorium and is regularly used for the larger first-year classes, seating up to 669 people. When used as a classroom, the Fraser Auditorium is divided into three smaller sections. The Fraser Auditorium is also used for special events and conferences, and for convocation ceremonies, held within the auditorium each spring.

The Fraser Auditorium has hosted the Falconbridge Lecture Series hosting such guests as Chief Justice Beverley McLachlin and Senator Roméo Dallaire (March 2006).

The auditorium also sometimes hosts cultural events, such as theatre and concert performances, and was the original home of the city's Théâtre du Nouvel-Ontario, Sudbury Theatre Centre, and Sudbury Symphony Orchestra.

=== McEwen School of Architecture ===
The McEwen School of Architecture is situated in downtown Sudbury, separated from the main campus.

=== Ben Avery Complex ===
The Ben Avery Complex is the sports building on campus. It has a weight and cardiovascular room, an IAAF eight-lane 400 metres (1,300 ft) Mondo track (2010) that complements the sport fields with seating for 5000, a four-lane indoor track, a rock climbing wall, a bouldering room, an Olympic size swimming pool with high rise diving boards, squash courts, basketball courts, and badminton nets. The pool has been closed since 2021.

=== Beach ===
The university owns over 765 acres (310 ha) of land, including a private beach. There are five freshwater lakes in the immediate campus area. School and residence activities are held at the beach year round. The beach is a 15-minute or less walk from all of the residences.

== Residences ==
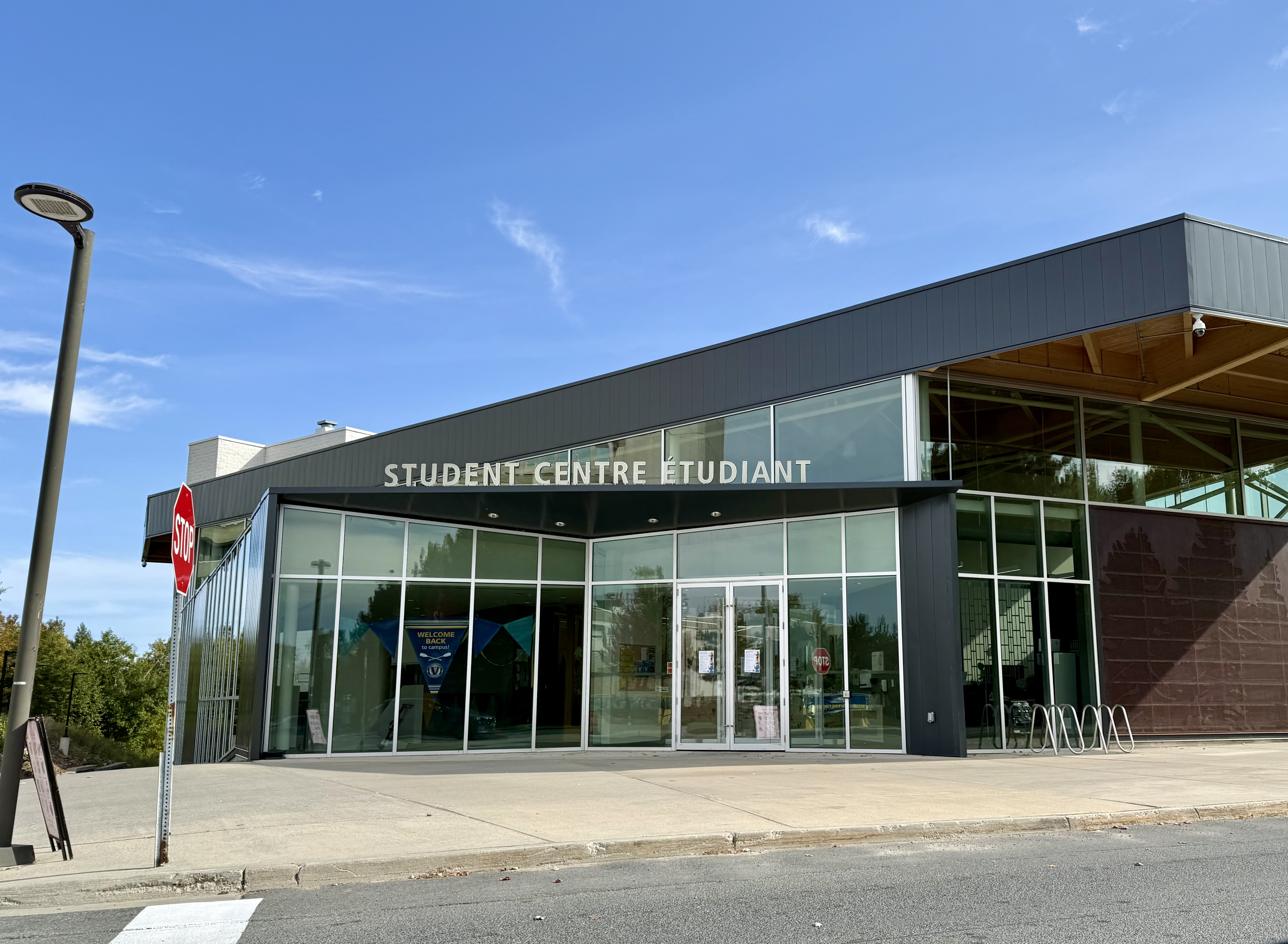
Student Centre

The Laurentian Residences offers five unique residences under the supervision of the main campus and three located at the main campus under the supervision of the federated colleges.

=== Single Student Residence ===
The Single Student Residence (SSR) is an apartment style complex, with apartment units for 4–6 residents, containing a living room, kitchen, and washrooms. The entire complex includes rooms for 387 students in 72 apartments. Student Street, consisting of a convenience store, computer room, mail room, snack bar, and games room, among other rooms and services, is located at the bottom of the SSR complex. A $5.9 million renovation of the residence began in 2013.

=== University College Residence ===
The University College Residence (UC) is a ten-storey co-ed building with single and double (shared) rooms, providing accommodations for 240 students. University College is also connected to Student Street, giving students access to the same amenities available to SSR students.

=== Married/Mature Student Residence ===
The Mature Student Residence (MSR) offers furnished apartments for those who have accumulated over 90 university credits. The residence is generally thought of as the quietest at Laurentian. Rooms consist of one bedroom, a living room, bathroom and kitchen.

=== The West Residence ===
This is a new residence completed in 2007. It is designed for students who have spent at least two years at the university and obtained a minimum of at least 60 credits. The residence consists of same sex apartment style rooms and cost $14.5 million CAD.

=== Huntington University ===
Huntington Residence houses 184 students in dorm-style rooms. Kitchens and TV lounges are present on both floors. The residence is located with the Academic complex which includes classrooms and a library. Huntington University is affiliated with the United Church of Canada, but does not require religious affiliation

=== East Residence ===
This is the newest residence on campus, completed for the 2012–2013 school year. This is a 12-story residence building and is for upper-year students (minimum 60 university credits) and has 62 self-contained apartments. Each unit has three or four single bedrooms, living room, kitchen and two bathrooms. The apartments are wired for cable TV, high-speed internet and telephone. In addition, this new residence is connected to Student Street.

== Notable alumni ==
- Rick Bartolucci
- Alex Baumann
- Michel Bock
- Minnijean Brown-Trickey
- Carlo Cattarello
- Kyle Davidson
- Marcel Desjardins
- Jean-Marc Edmé
- Leo Gerard
- Mike Harris
- Roy MacGregor
- Diane Marleau
- Elie Martel
- Tony Martin
- Ethel Rogers Mulvany
- Sharon Murdock
- Michelle O'Bonsawin
- André Paiement
- Michele Pollesel
- Marie-Paule Poulin
- Pauline Rochefort
- Tony Ruprecht
- Dave Salmoni
- Marc G. Serré
- Rosemary Sexton
- Derwyn Shea
- John Sola
- Sylvia Sweeney
- Shawn Swords
- Athena Tolentino
- Stephen Walkom
- John Willinsky
- Gary Wilson

== Noted faculty ==
- Frank F. Mallory (biology) – prolific author in the field of mammalian biology, in particular lemmings, wolves, coyotes, and black bears
- Lorenzo Cadieux (history) – Jesuit priest, historian, and founder of Société historique du Nouvel-Ontario
- Robert Dickson (études françaises) – recipient of the 2002 Governor General's Award for French language poetry
- Fernand Dorais (études françaises) – founder of the Théâtre du Nouvel-Ontario
- Rand Dyck (political science) – author of Canadian Politics: Critical Approaches, now in 6th Edition
- J. F. Hendry (English) – poet
- Shannon E. Hengen (English) – literary critic
- Gary Kinsman (sociology) – Canadian academic leader on lesbian, gay, bisexual, and transgender issues
- C. Michael Lesher (geology) – recipient of 2007 Duncan Ramsay Derry Medal of the Mineral Deposits Division of the Geological Association of Canada
- Lucien Matte – Jesuit priest and educator
- Karen Hermeston (photography) – first woman to serve as a war photographer in the Canadian Army
- Melchior Mbonimpa - religious studies professor and novelist
- Graeme S. Mount (history) – prolific author on international relations
- Darlene Naponse (English) – filmmaker, writer, director, and community activist
- Roger Nash (philosophy) – award-winning poet and philosopher
- Alan Nursall (science communication) – host of Daily Planet and The Alan Nursall Experience on Discovery Channel
- David Pearson (geology and science communication) – recipient of 2001 Ward Neale Medal from the Geological Association of Canada, 2003 McNeil Medal from the Royal Society of Canada, and appointed to the Order of Ontario in 2016
- Michael Persinger (psychology) – neuroscientist and recipient of 2007 IFT (Leader in Faculty Teaching) award and 2007 TVO (Ontario) Best Lecturer award
- Luis Radford (education) – recipient of 2011 Hans Freudenthal Medal
- Gregory Scofield - poet
- Adam Sol – Canadian American poet

== Arms ==
Coat of arms of Laurentian University
Notes Granted March 26, 2010 Crest A white pine tree Azure set on a rocky mount Or. Escutcheon Azure on a chevron Argent between in chief two open books Proper edged bound and clasped Or and in base a sun in splendour Or three cross-crosslets fitchy Sable. Supporters Two eagles in Anishinaabe style Argent embellished Azure and Sable. Motto Emitte Lucem Et Veritatem Badge On a hurt a white pine tree Argent set on a mount Or.

== See also ==
- List of Ontario universities
- Ontario Student Assistance Program
- Higher education in Ontario
- Canadian government scientific research organizations
- Canadian university scientific research organizations
- Canadian industrial research and development organizations
- Willet Green Miller Centre
