= Centre for Excellence in Mining Innovation =

Research initiative

Coordinates: 46.47°N 80.974°W

Centre for Excellence in Mining Innovation (CEMI)
- Company type: Mining Research Centre
- Industry: Mining
- Founded: 2007 as a Not for Profit Organization
- Headquarters: Greater Sudbury, Ontario, Canada
- Key people: Dr. Peter K. Kaiser, President/CEO
- Website: www.miningexcellence.ca

The Centre for Excellence in Mining Innovation (CEMI) is a Canadian mining industry research initiative, collaboratively funded by the private sector and government. CEMI was established in 2007, as a not for profit corporation. CEMI's focused research is in hardrock underground mining.

== History ==
In November 2003 the Ontario Government by way of the Ontario Mineral Industry Cluster Council (OMICC) started to develop a "cluster approach" for the mineral resources industry within Ontario. This approach involved bringing together key stakeholders from Ontario's mineral sector-related industries, organizations, and government agencies. In 2006 the initial seed funding was provided by Vale Inco ($5 million), Xstrata ($5 million), Ontario Government ($10 million) and the City of Greater Sudbury ($50,000) in a combination of cash and in-kind contributions over the following three years. In 2007 CEMI was formally established as a not for profit corporation.
