= Alphonse Paré =

Canadian mining engineer

Alphonse-Arthur "Al" Paré (16 January 1885 - 26 October 1955) was a Canadian mining engineer.

== Family and early life ==
Paré was born in 1885 to Dr. Louis-Alphonse Paré and his wife, Josephine Timmins, daughter of Noël Timmins (1828 - 1887) and Henriette Miner (1830 - 1894). Noël Timmins was a merchant who had emigrated from England with his parents, Joseph Timmins (1795 - 1835) and Marguerite Hirschbeck (aka Aspeck, died 1805). Hirschbeck was of German and French descent; her mother, Louise-Amable Morin, was a direct descendant of 17th-Century settlers Noël Morin and his wife, Hélène Desportes, the latter of whom is often counted as the first white child born in Canada. Both Miner and Timmins maternally descend from several early French-Canadian settler families, include Boucher, Langlois, Guyon, Gagné, Gaudry, Merlot, Proulx and Martin.

Paré's mother, Josephine, was the sister of Noah Timmins and Henry Timmins, each of whom married a sister of Dr. Paré's, so that three Timmins siblings were wed to three Paré siblings.

Growing up in the prairies, especially on his uncle's ranch, Paré was an excellent horseback rider, and, pushed by his sister, he applied to the Royal Military College in Kingston. Upon graduation, he was offered a commission as a captain with the British Army in India, which he initially accepted, but he was dissuaded from this course by his uncles and aunts in Montreal. Instead, they encouraged him to apply to McGill University, where he graduated as a mining engineer.

== Mining career ==
Noah Timmins and his nephew, Alphonse "Al" Paré, had negotiated with Alex Gillies (for whom Gillies Lake is named), and Benny Hollinger, who had uncovered what became known as the Hollinger Gold Mine. Paré was then a Royal Military College of Canada graduate studying mining engineering at McGill University at the behest of his Timmins uncles, with whom he had grown close. Al Paré described the find: "It was as if a giant cauldron had splattered the gold nuggets over a bed of pure blue quartz crystals as a setting for some magnificent crown jewels of inestimable value." On the strength of his nephew's information, Noah committed himself to paying $530,000. Noah put Paré, who had assessed the Hollinger Mine's potential, in charge of its operation for two years after incorporation. Hollinger Mines became known as one of the "Big Three" Canadian mines, together with the Dome Mine and the McIntyre Mines.

Although the family company explored stakes and mining operations all over the world, their greatest development remained the important Hollinger Mine in Timmins, Ontario, originally founded as a company town to house miners, which Paré had named after his uncle, Noah, in 1912.

== Personal life ==
Paré married Lucy Victoria Griffith (3 May 1888 - 24 April 1987), daughter of Irish-born Edward Arthur Griffith (1857 - 1949), who became a mining attorney, had migrated with his family to Australia in 1871 where, in 1887, he had secretly married Australian Lucy Jane Armstrong. Despite a Griffith family history of a happy union resulting from a clandestine wedding; the union of Lucy's parents precipitated a permanent estrangement between her father and his mother, Hannah Rose Cottingham (1826 - 1921), daughter of James Courtney Morton Cottingham, Esquire (1788 - 1876) and Hannah Robinson; she was the second wife and widow of Arthur Hill Griffith, an Irish magistrate (1810 - 1881) who was the son of Richard Griffith, MP and half-brother of Sir Richard Griffith, 1st Baronet.

The parents of Richard Griffith, MP were kinsmen who had secretly married in 1751. Richard Griffith, Sr. was wed to celebrated 18th-century Irish dramatist, fiction writer, essayist and actress, Elizabeth Griffith — the great-great-grandmother of Lucy Griffith Paré.

Lucy's father, E.A. Griffith had ventured from his home in Melbourne to the Eastern Goldfields of the Western Australian Goldfields in the Goldfields-Esperance region, to assuage the financial hardship that had resulted from family estrangement over his marriage, settling in Kalgoorlie and finding success as an attorney for North-Western Associated Gold Mines (W.A.), Limited.

The estranged younger brother of Lucy's father, Arthur Hill Griffith, for whom Griffith, New South Wales is named, became a Member of Parliament under the Australian Labor Party, and was eventually Minister for Public Works, then Minister of Public Education. A.H. Griffith encouraged the 1915 establishment of the Newcastle steelworks, personally negotiating the project with BHP.

== Legacy ==
The Alphonse and Lucy Griffith Paré Foundation was founded by the nine children of Al and Lucy Paré.

Paré's legacy is recounted in Lucy Griffith Paré's autobiography, The Seeds: The Life Story of a Matriarch, published in 1984.

Son Jules-Arthur Paré (1917 - 2013) was Professor Emeritus of McGill University Faculty of Medicine. His granddaughter– the great-granddaughter of Al and Lucy Paré –is actress Jessica Paré, who rose to fame in the cast of Mad Men. Alphonse Paré's great-grandson is David de Burgh Graham, member of the Parliament of Canada for Laurentides--Labelle.

== See also ==
- Porcupine Gold Rush
- Timmins Daily Press
