= Hollinger =

Hollinger may refer to:

== Places ==
- Hollinger, Nebraska, a community in the United States

== Businesses ==
- Hollinger Inc., the Canadian holding company that owns the Sun-Times Media Group
- Hollinger International, the former name of the Sun-Times Media Group
- Hollinger Consolidated Gold Mines, a Canadian mining company

== People ==
- Benny Hollinger, Canadian prospector
- Hollinger of Sweden (disambiguation), various princes
- David Hollinger, a professor at the University of California, Berkeley
- John Hollinger, VP of Basketball Operations for the Memphis Grizzlies and former basketball writer for ESPN.com
- Dennis Hollinger, president of Gordon–Conwell Theological Seminary
