= Noah Timmins =

Noah Anthony Timmins (March 31, 1867 – January 22, 1936) was a Canadian mining financier and developer who is now counted among the founding fathers of Canada's mining industry.

== Early life and family ==
Timmins was born Noé-Antoine, in Mattawa, Ontario, to Henriette Miner (1830 - 1894) and Noël Timmins (1828 - 1887), a merchant who had emigrated from England with his parents, Joseph Timmins (1795 - 1835) and Marguerite Hirschbeck (aka Aspeck, died 1805), the latter being of German and French descent — her mother, Louise-Amable Morin, was a direct descendant of 17th-century settlers Noël Morin and his wife, Hélène Desportes, who is often counted as the first white child born in Canada.

Both Miner and Timmins maternally descend from several early French-Canadian settler families, include Boucher, Langlois, Guyon, Gagné, Gaudry, Merlot, Proulx and Martin.

Noël Timmins prospered plying the lumber and fur trades, and founded the Timmins General Store in the French-Canadian hamlet of Mattawa, Ontario, where the family became "thoroughly francicized", according to Lucy Griffith Paré, wed to nephew Al Paré and author of The Seeds: The Life Story of a Matriarch, who encountered them "more at ease in French than in English". Today, Mattawa remains one-third francophone.

Noël Timmins bequeathed his general store and fortune to his two sons, Noah and Henry Timmins.

== Mining career ==
Noah Timmins partnered with his older brother Henry in 1903 to buy into the La Rose silver claim in Cobalt, Ontario at the onset of the Cobalt silver rush. Fred La Rose, a blacksmith, while working for brothers Duncan and John McMartin in the construction of the Temiskaming and Northern Ontario Railway at Mile 103 from North Bay, Ontario, where he had built a small cabin, there chanced upon Erythrite, often an indication of associated cobalt and native silver. A fanciful story later developed that La Rose discovered the vein when he threw a hammer at a pesky fox.

Noah subsequently heard of the claim from La Rose, who, at the end of his contract, had stopped at the Timmins brothers' general store in Mattawa, while returning to his home in Hull, Quebec. Noah cabled Henry, who was in Montreal, and immediately set out for Hull, where he met with La Rose and offered him $3,500 for a quarter share of the claim, effectively partnering with the McMartin brothers.

The foursome soon added a friend of the Timmins brothers, attorney David Alexander Dunlap (1863-1924), for whom the David Dunlap Observatory was named, as a full fifth partner after he had successfully defended their claim in a "nasty dispute" with then former Temiskaming and Northern Ontario Railway Commissioner M. J. O'Brien.

In 1910, the five partners incorporated as the Canadian Mining and Finance Company, Limited (later Hollinger Mines), with Noah appointed president. In 1916, officers of the corporation were reported as: "President, L. H. Timmins, Montreal; vice-president, J. McMartin, Cornwall, Ont.; treasurer, D. A. Dunlap, Toronto; secretary, John B. Holden, Toronto; general manager, P. A. Bobbins, Timmins, Ont."

Noah and his nephew, Alphonse "Al" Paré, then a student mining engineer at the Royal Military College of Canada, had negotiated with Alex Gillies (for whom Gillies Lake is named), and Benny Hollinger, who had uncovered what became known as the Hollinger Gold Mine. Paré described the find: “It was as if a giant cauldron had splattered the gold nuggets over a bed of pure blue quartz crystals as a setting for some magnificent crown jewels of inestimable value.” On the strength of his nephew's information, Noah committed himself to paying $530,000. Noah put Paré, who had assessed the Hollinger Mine's potential, in charge of its operation for two years after incorporation. Hollinger Mines became known as one of the "Big Three" Canadian mines, together with the Dome Mine and the McIntyre Mines.

Although the family company explored stakes and mining operations all over the world, their greatest development remained the important Hollinger Mine in Timmins, Ontario, originally founded as a company town to house miners, which Paré had named after his uncle, Noah, in 1912.

== Death and legacy ==
Timmins died in 1936 while vacationing in Palm Beach, Florida.

The City of Timmins is named for him.

In 1987, Timmins was inducted into the Canadian Business Hall of Fame and, in 1996, into the Canadian Mining Hall of Fame.

Timmins' nephew, Jules Robert Timmins (1889 - 1971), son of brother Henry, was inducted into the Canadian Mining Hall of Fame, in 1989, for first developing iron ore fields of northern Quebec and Labrador, called "one of the greatest projects in Canadian mining history", and, in the 1950s, building an "iron ore empire which was truly one of the most imaginative, most difficult mining projects ever undertaken".

The Alphonse and Lucy Griffith Paré Foundation was founded by the nine children of Noah's nephew, by sister Josephine, Al Paré, and his wife, Lucy. Four of Timmins' great-grandchildren are notable entertainers: Margo, Michael and Peter formed the alternative country band Cowboy Junkies, and Cali is an actress.

== See also ==
- Porcupine Gold Rush
- Timmins Daily Press

== Sources ==
- The Davis handbook of the Cobalt silver district: with a manual of incorporated companies: "Historical Sketch of Cobalt", by Harold Palmer Davis, Canadian Mining Journal, Ottawa, Canada, 1910, pages 7-14. Retrieved December 5, 2017.
- Changing Places: History, Community, and Identity in Northeastern Ontario by Kerry M. Abel, McGill-Queen's Press, 2006, page 147. Retrieved October 28, 2017.
- The Seeds: The Life Story of a Matriarch, by Lucy Griffith Paré (with Antoine Paré), Les Entreprises de Carpent Perdu Inc., Ste-Lucie-des-Laurentides, Québec, Canada, 1984.
- Noah Timmins at The Canadian Encyclopedia
- Republic of Mining via Mining.com, "Top ten most important mining men in Canadian history", by Stan Sudol, Dec. 1, 2016. Retrieved October 29, 2017.
- "The Mattawa Timmins Family in Perspective", by Doug Mackey, Past Forward Heritage Limited, October 31, 2008. Retrieved October 30, 2017.
- "Small Town Links", by Diane Armstrong, September 24, 2015. Retrieved October 30, 2017.
- "Top 10 Mining Events in Northern Ontario", by Stan Sudol, Republic of Mining, March 2, 2014. Retrieved October 30, 2017.
