= David Dunlap =

David Dunlap may refer to:

- David Dunlap (lobbyist), for Harsco Corporation, and EPA official
- David Dunlap (rower), American Olympic rower
- David L. Dunlap, American football player and coach
- David W. Dunlap, American reporter
- David Alexander Dunlap, Canadian lawyer, mining executive and philanthropist
