= Timmins =

- City (single-tier)
- City of Timmins
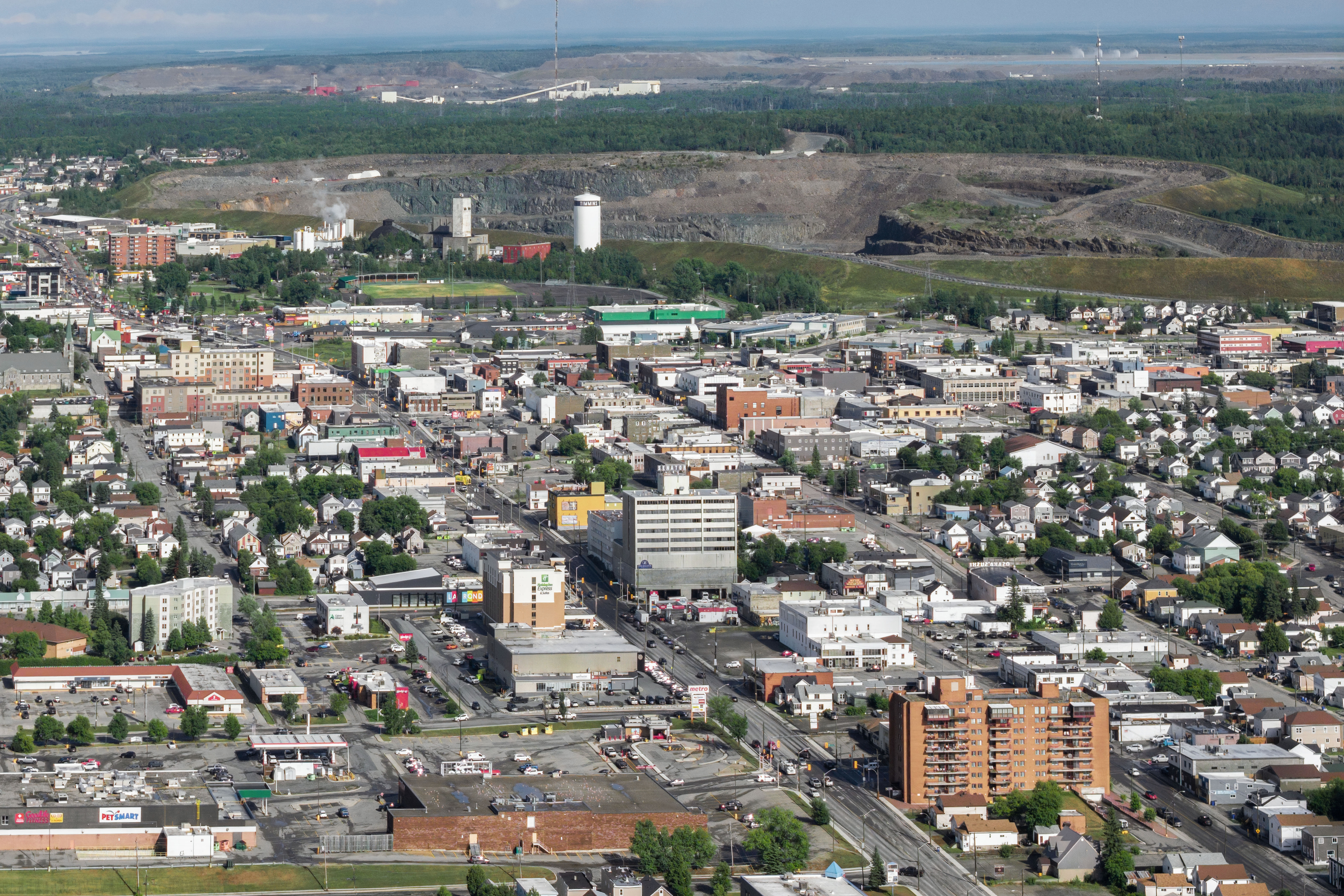
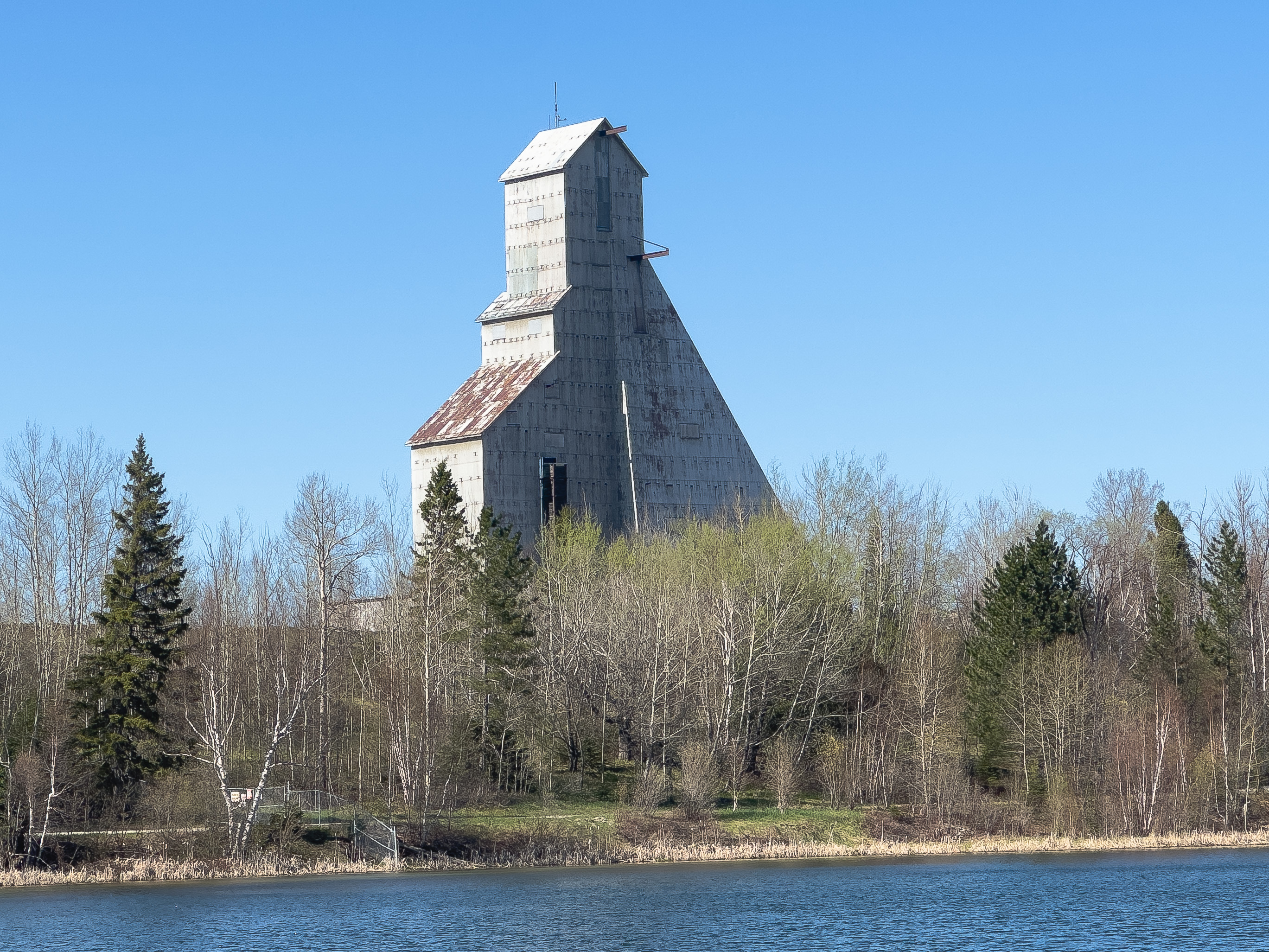
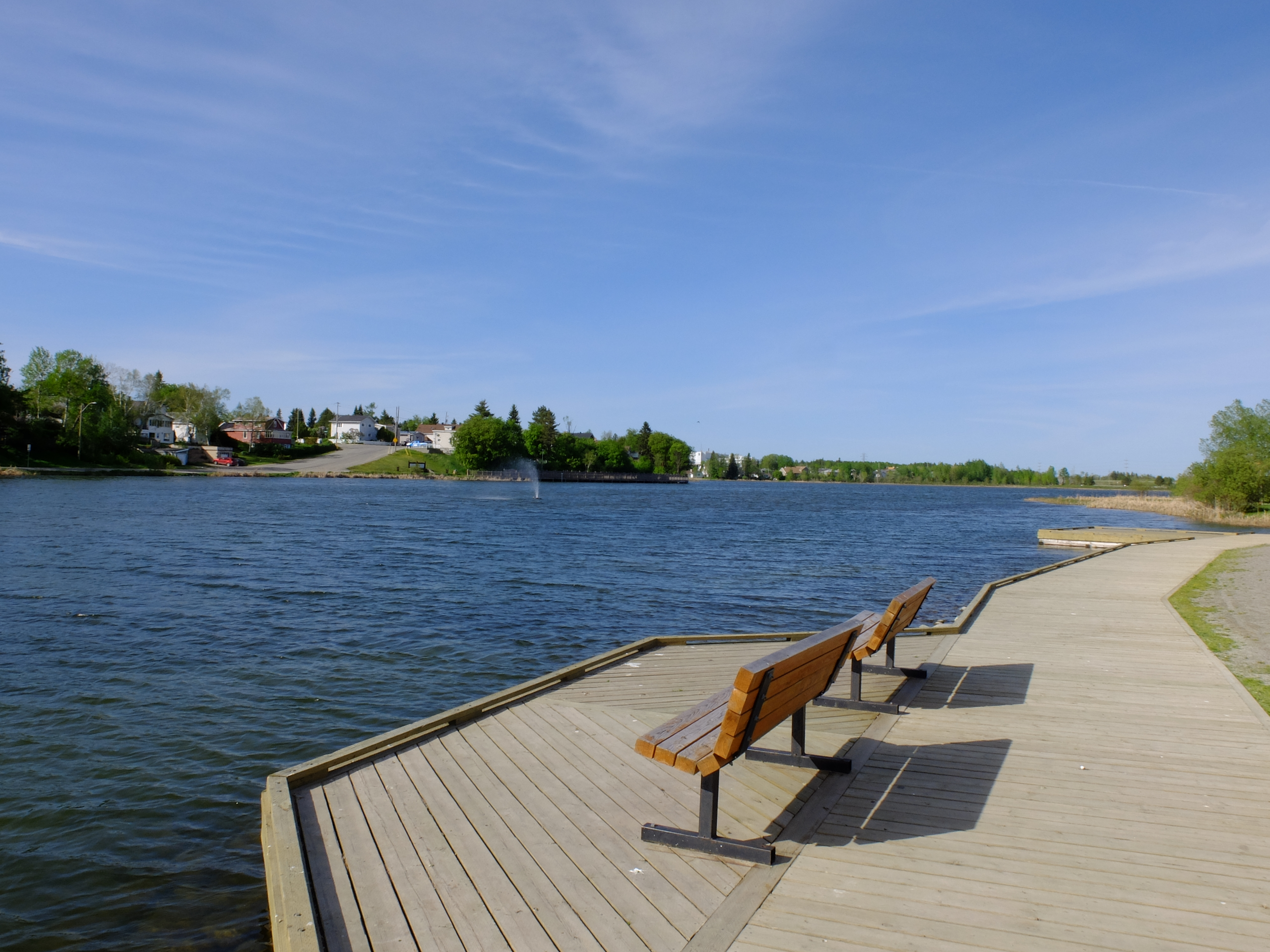
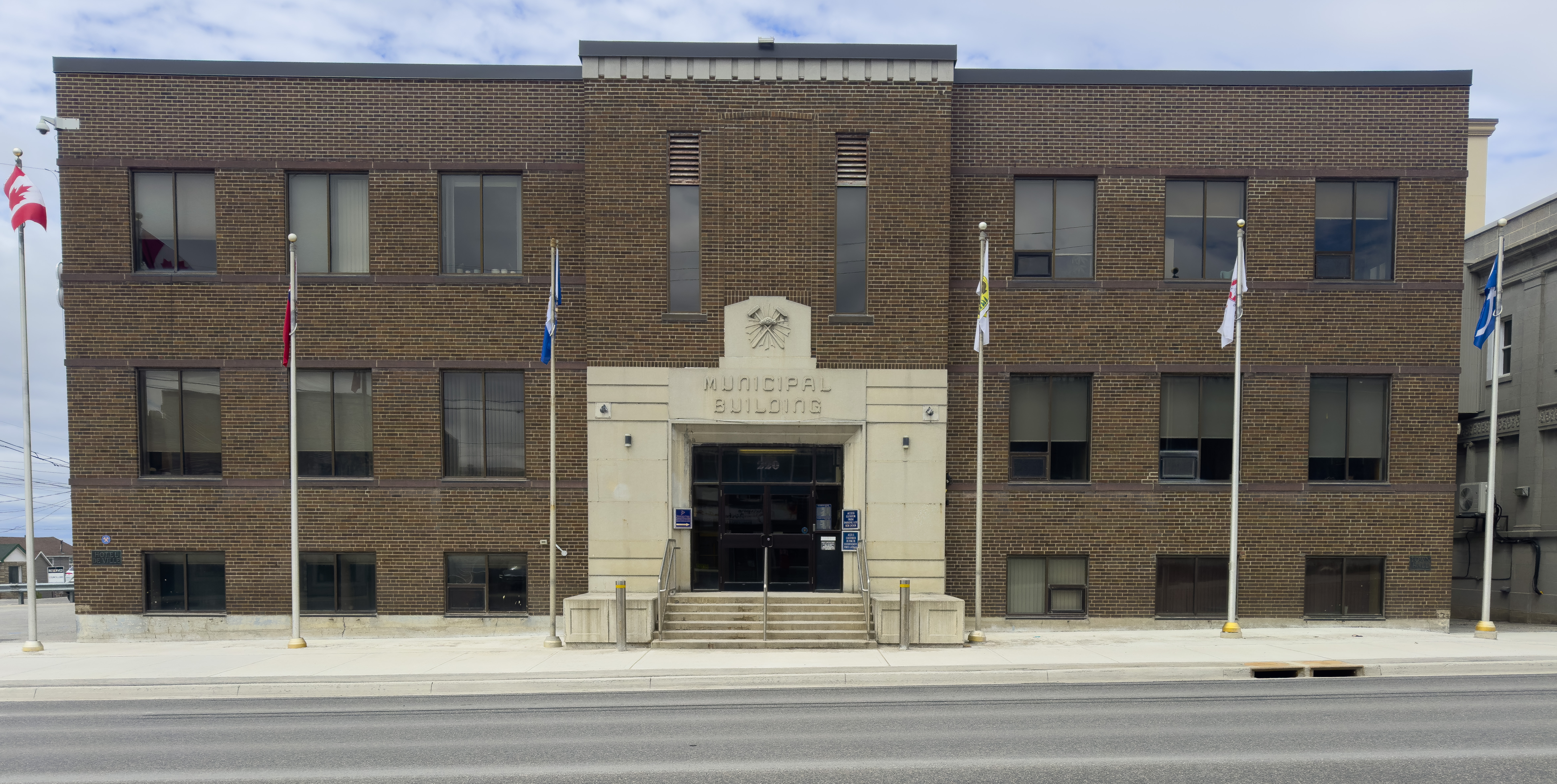
- Downtown Timmins McIntyre Headframe Gillies Lake City Hall

- Seal Logo
- Motto: The City with a Heart of Gold
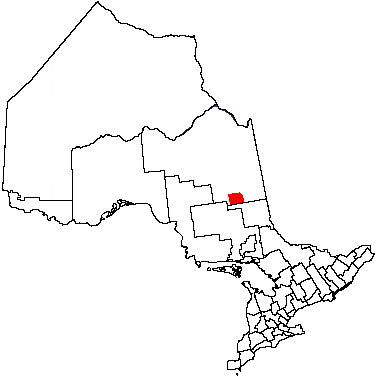

- Location within Ontario
- Coordinates: 48°28′18″N 81°19′53″W
- Country: Canada
- Province: Ontario
- District: Cochrane
- Established: 1912
- Named for: Henry Timmins and Noah Timmins

Government
  - Mayor: Michelle Boileau
  - Governing Body: Timmins City Council
  - MPs: Gaétan Malette (CPC)
  - MPPs: George Pirie (PC)

Area (2021)
  - Land: 2,955.33 km^{2} (1,141.06 sq mi)
  - Urban: 18.49 km^{2} (7.14 sq mi)
- Elevation: 294.70 m (966.9 ft)

Population (2021)
  - Total: 41,145
  - Estimate (2023): 44,967
  - Density: 13.9/km^{2} (36/sq mi)
  - Urban: 28,874
  - Urban density: 1,561.3/km^{2} (4,044/sq mi)
- Time zone: UTC−05:00 (EST)
  - Summer (DST): UTC−04:00 (EDT)
- Forward sortation area: P4N to P4R
- Area codes: 705, 249, 683
- Website: www.timmins.ca

Timmins (/ˈtɪmɪnz/ TIM-inz) is a city in northeastern Ontario, Canada, located on the Mattagami River. The city is the fourth-largest city in the Northeastern Ontario region with a population of 41,145 at the 2021 Canadian census and an estimated population of 44,819 in 2023. The city's economy is based on natural resource extraction. It is supported by industries related to lumbering, and to the mining of gold, zinc, copper, nickel, and silver. Timmins serves as a regional service and distribution centre.

The city has a large Francophone community, with more than 50% of the residents bilingual in French and English.

== History ==
=== Early history ===
Archaeological evidence indicates that the area has been inhabited for at least 6,500 years. The first inhabitants were nomadic peoples of the Shield Archaic culture. The area was inhabited primarily by the Cree and Ojibwe peoples up until the time of European colonization.

The first Europeans to make contact with the local Indigenous peoples were French explorers in the late 1600s.

The first attempt at a permanent European presence in the area did not come until 1785, nearly two decades after Great Britain defeated France in the Seven Years' War and took over its territory in North America east of the Mississippi River. Philip Turnor, a surveyor and cartographer for the Hudson's Bay Company, established a trading outpost at Fredrick House Lake, about 30 km (19 mi) north-east of present-day downtown Timmins.

Although beaver fur was plentiful and still in demand in Europe, the trading post was not successful. Nearby competition, and the difficulty of navigating the Abitibi and Fredrick House rivers by canoe, often resulted in the post being unsupplied.

Frederick House Post was functionally abandoned in 1812, when a man named Capascoos killed all 12 of the trading post's staff, as well as looted and damaged the building. Capascoos was never caught, and the building was never rebuilt. However, temporary log shelters were put in place nearby to facilitate fur trading until 1821, when the post was officially declared closed by the Hudson's Bay Company.

More than a century later, in 1906, Treaty 9 was signed between Anishinaabe (Algonquin and Ojibwe), Omushkegowuk Cree communities, and the Canadian Crown. It required the Mattagami First Nation to move to the north of Mattagami Lake and to cede territory.

=== Porcupine Gold Rush ===
The presence of gold in the area was long known to the local indigenous people, and the few Europeans who had settled nearby. Outcroppings of gold-bearing quartz were a familiar sight in the region, but there was little commercial interest due to the area's inaccessibility.

The extension of the Temiskaming and Northern Ontario Railway to Cochrane in 1907, allowed prospectors to more easily access the area. This sparked an interest in the region's natural resources, leading to the Porcupine Gold Rush. The first known prospectors were a team led by Reuben D'Aigle. They set out for Porcupine Lake in 1907 and dug several test pits in the surrounding area, but none of them had near the amount of gold which D'Aigle's team was seeking. They eventually abandoned their tools in the last pit they dug, approximately 8 km west of Porcupine Lake, and returned home.

Two years later in 1909, a prospector duo consisting of Benny Hollinger and Alex Gillies arrived in the Porcupine region. They met up with another group, led by Jack Wilson. Earlier in the season he had found a "dome" of quartz that contained large veins of gold stretching several hundred feet in length and 46 m (150 ft) in width. This section was later exploited and developed as the Dome Mine.

Wilson advised Hollinger & Gillies that all the good sites in a 10 km (6.2 mi) radius had been claimed, so the duo went slightly further west. There they stumbled upon D'Aigle's abandoned test pits and tools. While Gilles was inspecting the abandoned pits, Hollinger pulled a bit of moss from a nearby quartz outcropping and revealed a large vein of gold. Gillies later noted that he had found a boot print pressed into some moss covering the gold vein. This print was believed left by one of D'Aigle's team two years before. They had departed unaware of the large vein under their feet.

Two Mattawa shopkeeper brothers, named Noah Timmins and Henry Timmins, arrived in the area in 1910. They began purchasing shares of local mines, and bought Benny Hollinger's share from him.

Around the same time, Scottish businessman Sandy McIntyre discovered the McIntyre Mine near Pearl Lake, four miles away. Hollinger Mines was incorporated later that year with five equal partners consisting of Noah and Henry Timmins; Duncan and John McMartin (also brothers); and Mattawa attorney David Dunlap.

==== "Moss slip" story ====
A popular founding myth of Timmins and the Porcupine area states that a man named Harry Preston slipped on moss and uncovered gold. In some versions of the story, he is responsible for triggering the Porcupine Gold Rush. However, historical records contradict both claims.

Harry Preston arrived in the Porcupine area as a part of a team led by Jack Wilson in June 1909, where they discovered a large "dome shaped quartz outcrop". Wilson was said to have been the first to notice gold as the Sun struck the quartz.

As I was examining the seams in the quartz, about twelve feet ahead of me I saw a piece of yellow glisten as the sun struck it. It proved to be a very spectacular piece of gold in a thin sean of schist... when the boys came back we got out the drills and hammers, and that night had about 132 pounds of very spectacular specimens

— Michael Barnes Fortunes in the ground: Cobalt, Porcupine & Kirkland Lake

The only comparable mention of moss comes from Hollinger and Gilles, who arrived in the area two months after Wilson's team. According to Gilles's report, while he inspected D'Aigle's abandoned work, Hollinger was looking at some nearby quartz when he peeled back a bit of moss, revealing a large vein of gold.

I was cutting a discovery post and Benny was pulling some moss of rocks a few feet away when he suddenly let a roar out of him and threw his hat at me. At first, I thought he has gone crazy but when I came over to where he was, it wasn't hard to see the reason. The quartz where he had pulled the moss off looked as though someone had dripped a candle along it, but instead of wax, it was gold we saw. Don't let anyone ever tell you that the original Hollinger discovery left any doubts of its importance. When we pulled the moss three feet out of the ground and away the quartz stood out, about six-feet wide with splattered over it for about 60 feet along the vein. D'Aigle had worked the property and cut many trails through the bush but by a queer quirk of luck, one of his trails from the test pit passes the richest part of the vein at a point where he could have easily reached out and touched it with his hand.

— Michael Barnes Fortunes in the ground: Cobalt, Porcupine & Kirkland Lake

Additionally, historians generally agree that expansion of the Temiskaming and Northern Ontario Railway, which connected Central Ontario to Northern Ontario, was instrumental in triggering the Porcupine Gold Rush because it made the area accessible. The Canadian Pacific Railway expansion to was also critical, as it enabled travellers from Toronto to go directly north instead of taking a time-consuming detour around Eastern Ontario.

=== Settlement and company towns ===
A company town was founded near modern-day Gillies Lake, to house Hollinger Mines employees. Mine manager Alphonse "Al" Paré named the growing mining camp "Timmins", after his uncle, Noah Timmins, who was then the President of Hollinger Mines. Two more settlements were founded by competing mines: The "Porcupine/Dome" camp was situated on Porcupine Lake, and owned by Dome Mines. "Schumacher" camp was situated on Pearl Lake, and owned by McIntyre Mines.

Joe Torlone noted in his dissertation that Timmins was never truly a company town. The combined mines behaved more like a "very influential industrial citizen", rather than a single company that dominated all aspects of civilian life. As the worker population grew, these camps started to mesh together as a single town. (Torlone later served as the municipal Chief Administrative Officer.)

==== Great Porcupine Fire ====
On July 10, 1911, unusually hot and dry temperatures caused small fires to ignite at the Porcupine settlement. These were initially described as a series of "bushfires", but strong winds spread them into the dry forest and they expanded. Evacuation efforts began on the morning of July 11, with women and children being ferried to the opposite end of Porcupine Lake.

The small fires eventually merged, and grew into a single wall of fire, estimated to be at least 32 km (20 mi) wide. The fire destroyed the Porcupine mining camp at around 3:30pm, and continued as far north as Cochrane. The total number of deaths remains uncertain, with the lowest estimates being 73 and the highest suggesting there were more than 200 dead. A number of people drowned after fleeing into the lake in an attempt to escape the heat and smoke; others were killed by smoke while still trapped underground in the mine.

The executives of the Dome Mine held meetings about reopening within two days of the fire. The camp was quickly rebuilt with help from various communities around Ontario, and operations soon resumed.

The fire burned the thin layers of moss and soil characteristic of a Canadian Shield landscape. This revealed previously unknown veins of gold and other minerals, which helped facilitate economic recovery efforts.

==== Incorporation, growth, and World Wars ====
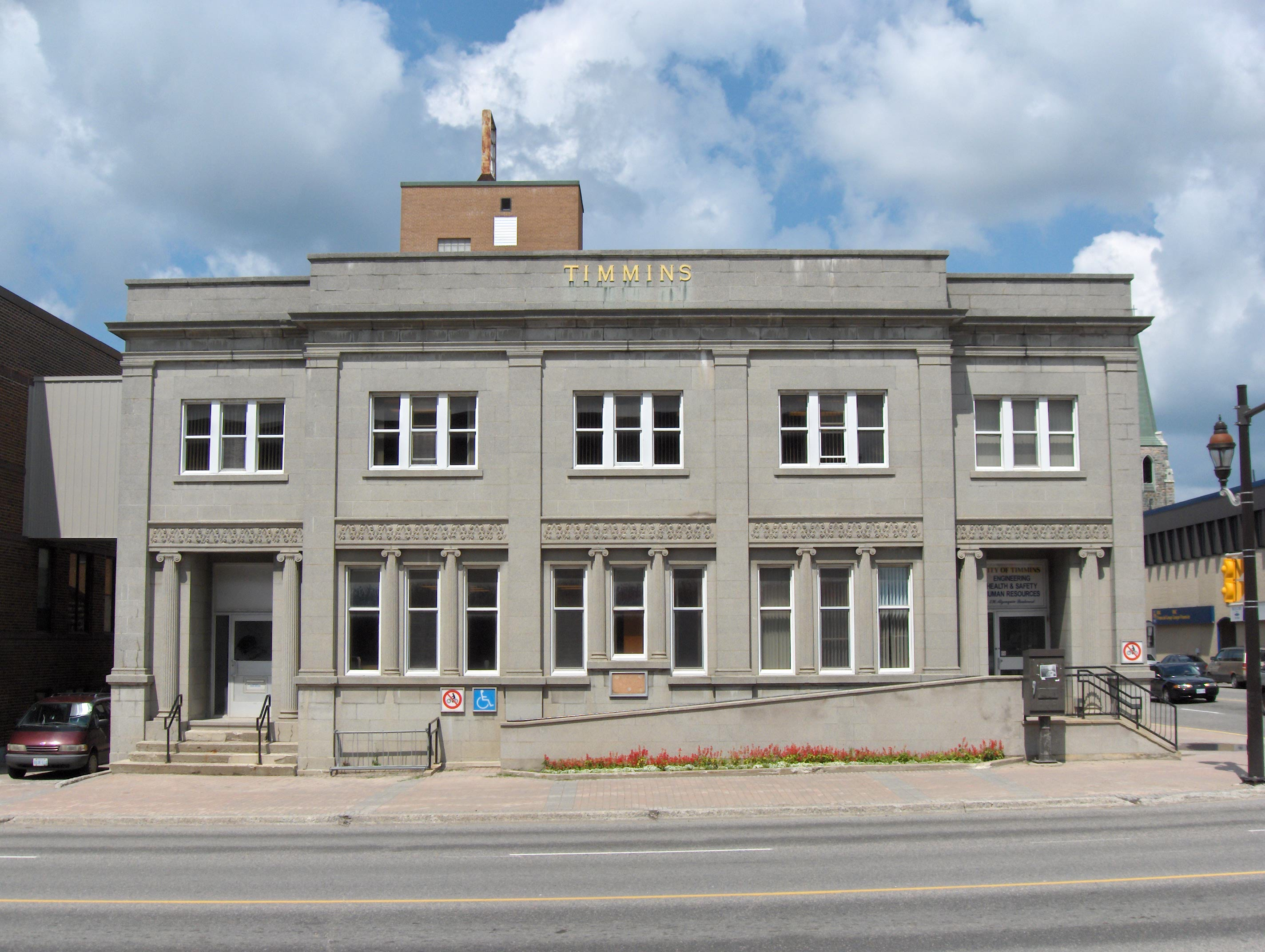
City Hall Engineering Building, formerly the main public library, previously the post office

Given the fire, and the need to replace housing as well as serve newly arrived refugees from the Porcupine camp, Noah Timmins to began planning a townsite at the Timmins camp. The first lots went up for sale on September 4, 1911, ranging in price from $5 to $10 ($135–$265 in 2024) for residential lots, and from $75 to $1,000 ($2,000–$25,000 in 2024) for commercial lots. Migrants were attracted to the new lands for sale, and the Timmins camp quickly surpassed the Porcupine and Schumacher camps in population. Timmins was incorporated as a municipality on January 1, 1912.

In November 1912, 1,200 members of the Western Federation of Miners Local 145 held a strike at all three mines in response to a proposal to lower their wages. Mine operators hired gun thugs, who fired on the picket line and were ordered out by the provincial government. After months without work, many men chose to leave the settlement; only 500 miners returned to work in July 1913. The strike won the men a nine-hour workday and a pay increase.

In 1917, a dam was built at Kenogamissi Falls, downriver from Mattagami Lake, to provide power to Timmins and the surrounding area, Mattagami Lake was consequently flooded.

A recruitment campaign for soldiers during the First World War was successful in enlisting around 600 men out of the less than 2,000 total residents at the time. The miners were coveted by the Canadian Expeditionary Force for their ability to dig trenches, and experience with handling explosives. News of the war and letters from soldiers abroad were frequently published in the town's local newspaper, The Porcupine Advance (TPA). After receiving news of armistice, major celebrations were held all around the Timmins area, as described by a journalist for TPA:

Before six o'clock on Monday morning, the news had reached Timmins that the Armistice had been duly signed and the fighting was thus over for the present. Timmins at once commenced to celebrate and kept it up all day and most of the night. First, the fire bell rang; then all the other bells and all the steam whistles joined in the chorus, the outgoing T&NO train adding its due quota of joyful noise. Flags and decorations were brought out, and from an early hour in the morning, groups of boys and girls were out with their horns, whistles and tin pan bands. After the noon hour, the crowds began to gather in the main part of the town, one of the chief centres of interest being Marshall-Ecclestone's window where an effigy of the Kaiser was displayed. The effigy was made by the Hollinger carpenter staff and was an unusually clever piece of workmanship. The form was made of wood, the limbs and body being perfectly formed and the face and head well-shaped. It was more than life-size and very life-like. Dressed in long boots, brass helmet, iron crosses and shining sword, the wooden Kaiser was stuffed with oakum, ready for the flames.

— Timmins Celebrates Truce a Second Time

The Great Depression did not adversely affect the economy of the area, and jobs were available in mining and lumber.

During the Second World War, around a third of the city's population were enlisted into the armed forces. Timmins had its own bomber squadron known as "Porcupine Squadron No. 433", a heavy bomber unit of No. 6 group RCAF in Skipton-on-Swale, England. Timmins' economy suffered slightly during this period as women were prohibited from working in mines under the Ontario Mining Act, leaving no one to replace the enlisted miners.

=== Decline and recent history ===
In the 1950s, Mattagami 71, the reserve of the Mattagami First Nation was once again relocated, this time to its present day location, south of Mattagami Lake.

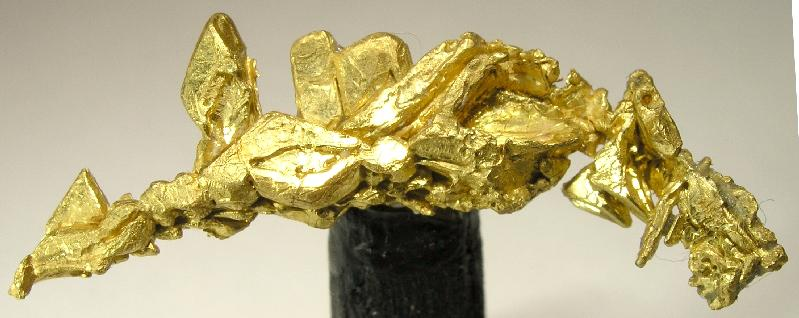
Specimen gold, probably from Pamour Mine

By the mid 1960s, the majority of the original mines had depleted their gold content and mines began to close. Hollinger Mine was closed in 1968, having produced nearly 20 million troy ounces of gold. Twenty years later in 1988, the McIntyre mines ceased operations having produced around 11 million troy ounces of gold.

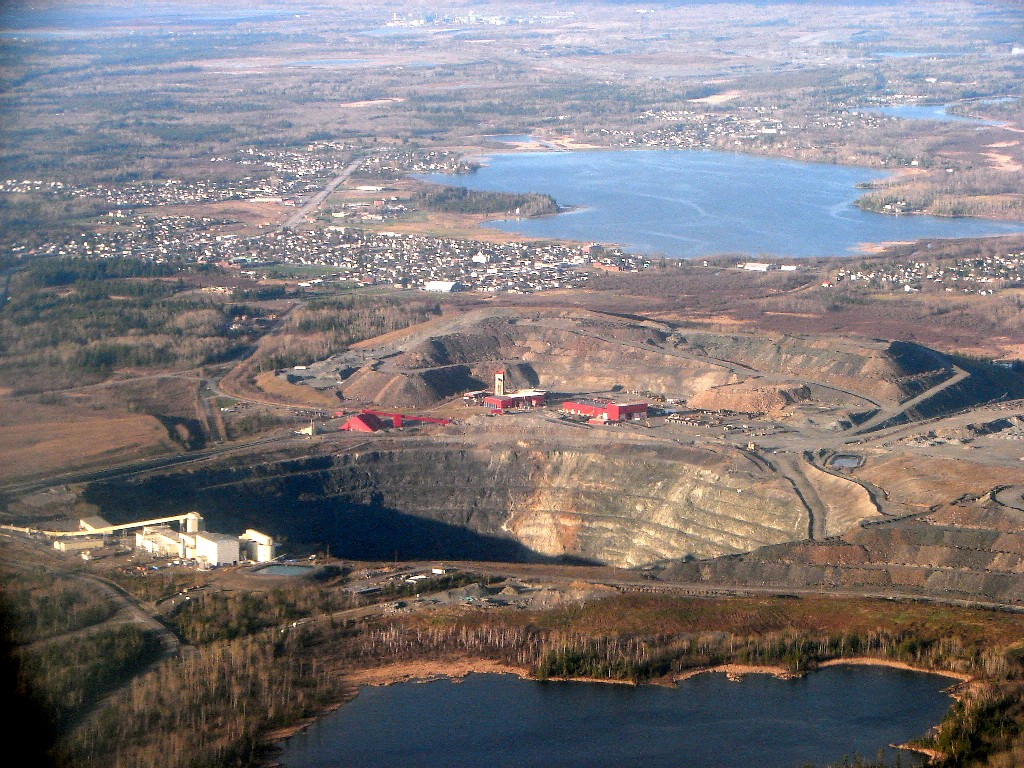
Dome Mine "super pit", 2010

In 1973, 35 townships covering 3,300 km^{2} (1,260 mi^{2}), including Porcupine, South Porcupine, Schumacher, and Timmins were organized into the City of Timmins.

The city's population peaked in the mid 1990s, when the city became a regional service and distribution centre for Northeastern Ontario. However, with the exception of a slight bump in 2011, the population has been consistently declining.

Rail service to Timmins was discontinued in 1990, but is expected to return within the next decade.

The last of the original three mines to close was the Dome Mine, which was closed in 2017, after 107 years of operation, and about 17 million troy ounces of gold produced.

== Climate ==
Timmins is near the northern periphery of the hemiboreal humid continental climate (Dfb). Timmins has cold and snowy winters, being located in Northern Ontario. Temperatures in late summer and autumn tend to be among the coolest for any non-coastal major city in Canada. During the late spring and summer, temperatures can rise considerably, sometimes accompanied by high humidity and unstable air masses. The highest temperature ever recorded in Timmins was 39.4 °C (103 °F) on July 12, 1936. The coldest temperature ever recorded was −45.6 °C (−50 °F) on February 1, 1962.

Climate data for Timmins (Timmins Victor M. Power Airport) WMO ID: 71739; coordinates 48°34′11″N 81°22′36″W; elevation: 294.7 m (967 ft); 1991–2020 normals, extremes 1913–present
Month	Jan	Feb	Mar	Apr	May	Jun	Jul	Aug	Sep	Oct	Nov	Dec	Year
Record high humidex	7.7	10.7	29.4	32.1	41.1	43.0	42.4	42.0	40.1	30.7	25.1	11.8	43.0
Record high °C (°F)	8.3 (46.9)	12.2 (54.0)	27.9 (82.2)	29.9 (85.8)	35.3 (95.5)	38.8 (101.8)	39.4 (102.9)	36.7 (98.1)	36.1 (97.0)	29.3 (84.7)	22.0 (71.6)	14.2 (57.6)	39.4 (102.9)
Mean maximum °C (°F)	1.9 (35.4)	4.0 (39.2)	12.3 (54.1)	20.3 (68.5)	29.0 (84.2)	31.5 (88.7)	31.5 (88.7)	30.9 (87.6)	27.5 (81.5)	21.6 (70.9)	11.8 (53.2)	4.3 (39.7)	33.1 (91.6)
Mean daily maximum °C (°F)	−10.4 (13.3)	−7.6 (18.3)	−0.7 (30.7)	7.2 (45.0)	16.8 (62.2)	22.4 (72.3)	24.4 (75.9)	22.8 (73.0)	17.8 (64.0)	9.1 (48.4)	0.8 (33.4)	−6.5 (20.3)	8.0 (46.4)
Daily mean °C (°F)	−16.4 (2.5)	−14.4 (6.1)	−7.5 (18.5)	0.9 (33.6)	9.7 (49.5)	15.3 (59.5)	17.7 (63.9)	16.2 (61.2)	11.7 (53.1)	4.5 (40.1)	−3.2 (26.2)	−11.2 (11.8)	1.9 (35.4)
Mean daily minimum °C (°F)	−22.3 (−8.1)	−21 (−6)	−14.4 (6.1)	−5.3 (22.5)	2.5 (36.5)	8.1 (46.6)	10.9 (51.6)	9.6 (49.3)	5.5 (41.9)	−0.1 (31.8)	−7.1 (19.2)	−15.9 (3.4)	−4.1 (24.6)
Mean minimum °C (°F)	−37.0 (−34.6)	−35.3 (−31.5)	−30.1 (−22.2)	−17.4 (0.7)	−5.3 (22.5)	−0.8 (30.6)	3.3 (37.9)	1.6 (34.9)	−2.9 (26.8)	−7.8 (18.0)	−20.0 (−4.0)	−31.3 (−24.3)	−38.5 (−37.3)
Record low °C (°F)	−44.2 (−47.6)	−45.6 (−50.1)	−38.9 (−38.0)	−29.4 (−20.9)	−13.9 (7.0)	−5.6 (21.9)	−1.1 (30.0)	−3.3 (26.1)	−6.7 (19.9)	−19 (−2)	−33.9 (−29.0)	−43.9 (−47.0)	−45.6 (−50.1)
Record low wind chill	−54.2	−53.7	−45.8	−37.1	−18.8	−8.5	0.0	−4.0	−9.3	−20.4	−38.0	−53.1	−54.2
Average precipitation mm (inches)	49.0 (1.93)	39.9 (1.57)	48.3 (1.90)	61.7 (2.43)	69.9 (2.75)	80.4 (3.17)	78.7 (3.10)	75.6 (2.98)	81.2 (3.20)	86.2 (3.39)	68.9 (2.71)	56.6 (2.23)	796.2 (31.35)
Average rainfall mm (inches)	4.0 (0.16)	1.1 (0.04)	14.3 (0.56)	35.3 (1.39)	63.5 (2.50)	77.9 (3.07)	84.8 (3.34)	77.0 (3.03)	81.7 (3.22)	66.8 (2.63)	28.1 (1.11)	8.7 (0.34)	543.1 (21.38)
Average snowfall cm (inches)	59.2 (23.3)	47.9 (18.9)	43.2 (17.0)	25.3 (10.0)	3.1 (1.2)	0.2 (0.1)	0.0 (0.0)	0.0 (0.0)	0.5 (0.2)	13.7 (5.4)	50.8 (20.0)	63.8 (25.1)	307.6 (121.1)
Average precipitation days (≥ 0.2 mm)	18.6	15.4	14.8	12.3	13.0	15.0	14.8	14.0	15.3	17.1	19.1	19.9	189.3
Average rainy days (≥ 0.2 mm)	1.6	0.89	3.7	7.1	12.1	14.6	14.7	14.3	14.9	14.1	6.5	2.9	107.4
Average snowy days (≥ 0.2 cm)	18.1	14.0	11.6	6.1	1.7	0.11	0.0	0.0	0.42	5.6	15.6	18.6	91.8
Average relative humidity (%) (at 1500 LST)	70.4	61.7	52.9	48.9	45.7	48.8	53.1	55.5	60.4	67.1	75.1	76.9	59.7
Average dew point °C (°F)	−19.0 (−2.2)	−17.9 (−0.2)	−12.8 (9.0)	−6.2 (20.8)	1.7 (35.1)	8.4 (47.1)	12.0 (53.6)	11.3 (52.3)	7.8 (46.0)	1.2 (34.2)	−5.6 (21.9)	−13.3 (8.1)	−2.6 (27.3)
Source 1: Environment and Climate Change Canada
Source 2: weatherstats.ca (for dewpoint and monthly/yearly average absolute maximum/minimum temperature)

== Demographics ==
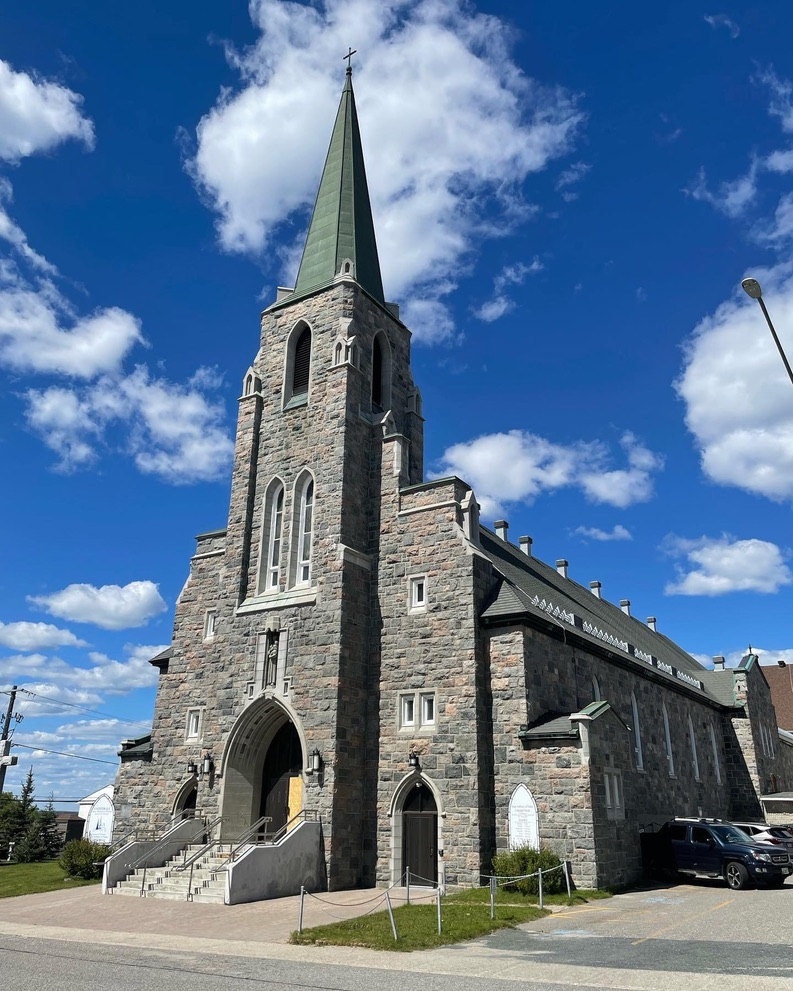
St. Anthony of Padua Cathedral

In the 2021 Canadian census conducted by Statistics Canada, Timmins had a population of 41,145 living in 17,886 of its 19,390 total private dwellings, a change of −1.5% from its 2016 population of 41,788. With a land area of 2,955.33 km^{2} (1,141.06 sq mi), it had a population density of 13.9/km^{2} (36.1/sq mi) in 2021.

Canada census – Timmins community profile

	2021	2016	2011
Population	41,145 (−1.5% from 2016)	41,788 (−3.2% from 2011)	43,165 (0.4% from 2006)
Land area	2,955.33 km^{2} (1,141.06 sq mi)	2,978.83 km^{2} (1,150.13 sq mi)	2,979.15 km^{2} (1,150.26 sq mi)
Population density	13.9/km^{2} (36/sq mi)	14.0/km^{2} (36/sq mi)	14.5/km^{2} (38/sq mi)
Median age	42.0 (M: 40.8, F: 43.2)	41.4 (M: 40.7, F: 42.2)
Private dwellings	19,390 (total) 17,886 (occupied)	19,317 (total) 17,740 (occupied)	18,806 (total)
Median household income	$82,000	$73,541

References: 2021 2016 2011

2021 Canadian census		Population	% of total population
European Canadian		38,515	81.46%
Visible minority	South Asian	765	1.86%
Visible minority	Black	255	0.62%
Visible minority	Chinese	195	0.47%
Visible minority	Filipino	195	0.47%
Visible minority	Southeast Asian	70	0.17%
Visible minority	Arab	65	0.16%
Visible minority	West Asian	60	0.15%
Visible minority	Latin American	30	0.07%
Visible minority	Korean	30	0.07%
Visible minority	Japanese	30	0.07%
Visible minority	Visible minority (not included above)	30	0.07%
Total visible minority population		1,725	4.19%
Indigenous peoples
Indigenous peoples	Métis	3,150	7.66%
Indigenous peoples	First Nations	2,640	6.42%
Indigenous peoples	Inuit	55	0.13%
	Indigenous responses (not included above)	60	0.15%
Total Indigenous population		5,905	14.35%
Total population		41,145	100

Historical census populations – Timmins

Year	Pop.	±%
1912	974	—
1921	3,843	+294.6%
1931	14,200	+269.5%
1941	28,544	+101.0%
1951	27,743	−2.8%
1956	27,551	−0.7%
1961	29,270	+6.2%

Year	Pop.	±%
1966	29,303	+0.1%
1971	28,542	−2.6%
1976	44,747	+56.8%
1981	46,114	+3.1%
1986	46,657	+1.2%
1991	47,461	+1.7%
1996	47,499	+0.1%

Year	Pop.	±%
2001	43,686	−8.0%
2006	42,997	−1.6%
2011	43,165	+0.4%
2016	41,788	−3.2%
2021	41,145	−1.5%

Source: Statistics Canada

=== Language ===
In Timmins, according to the 2021 census, 60.26% of the population reported English as their mother tongue (Anglophone), 34.25% reported French (Francophone) as their first language, and 5.49% reported a non-official language, neither English nor French, as their first language (Allophone). 50.8% of the population is bilingual in English and French.

=== Jewish community ===
From the foundation of the city, Jewish emigrants, mostly from Russia and Eastern Europe came to the town in order to work in the mines industry. In 1917 Rabbi Yaakov Schulman arrived in the city and was in charge of religious needs, such as kosher meat. In 1925 there were 200 Jews living in the city. In that year the Jewish community was officially established. The community was not isolated and maintained good relationships with non-Jews, especially emigrants from Russia and Eastern Europe, who spoke the same languages they did. Only in the 1930s were actual community institutions built, such as a synagogue and a school.

Since 1928 the Jewish community has held an annual Purim ball. The ball was mixed: Jews and non-Jews, men and women. Part of the ball was a beauty pageant named malkat Ester.

The Jewish population peaked around the 1950s, when it included around 160 families.

In the early 1970s the Timmins synagogue was closed due to a decrease in the town's Jewish population.

== Culture and contemporary life ==
=== Tourism ===
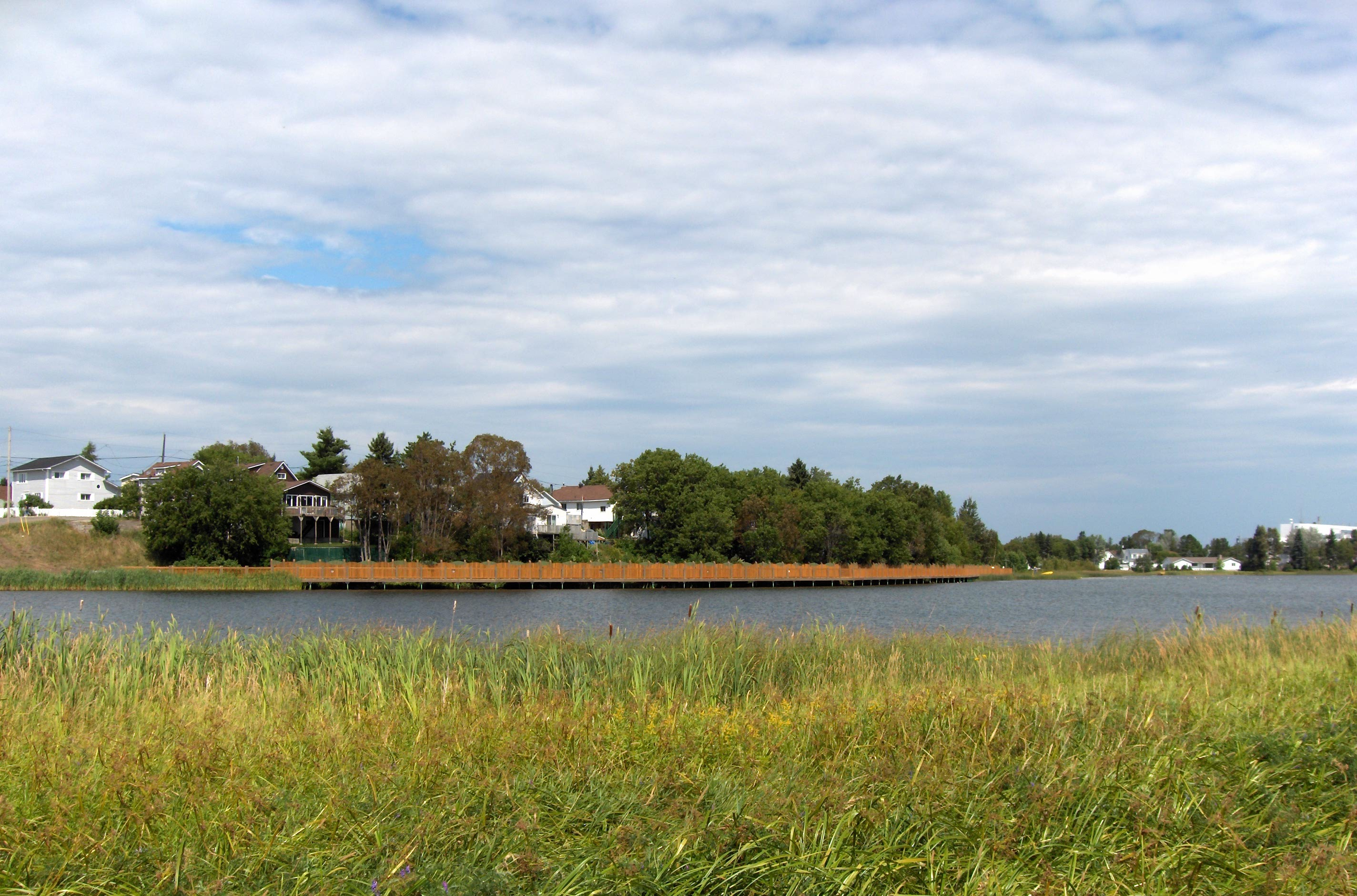
Gillies Lake board walk

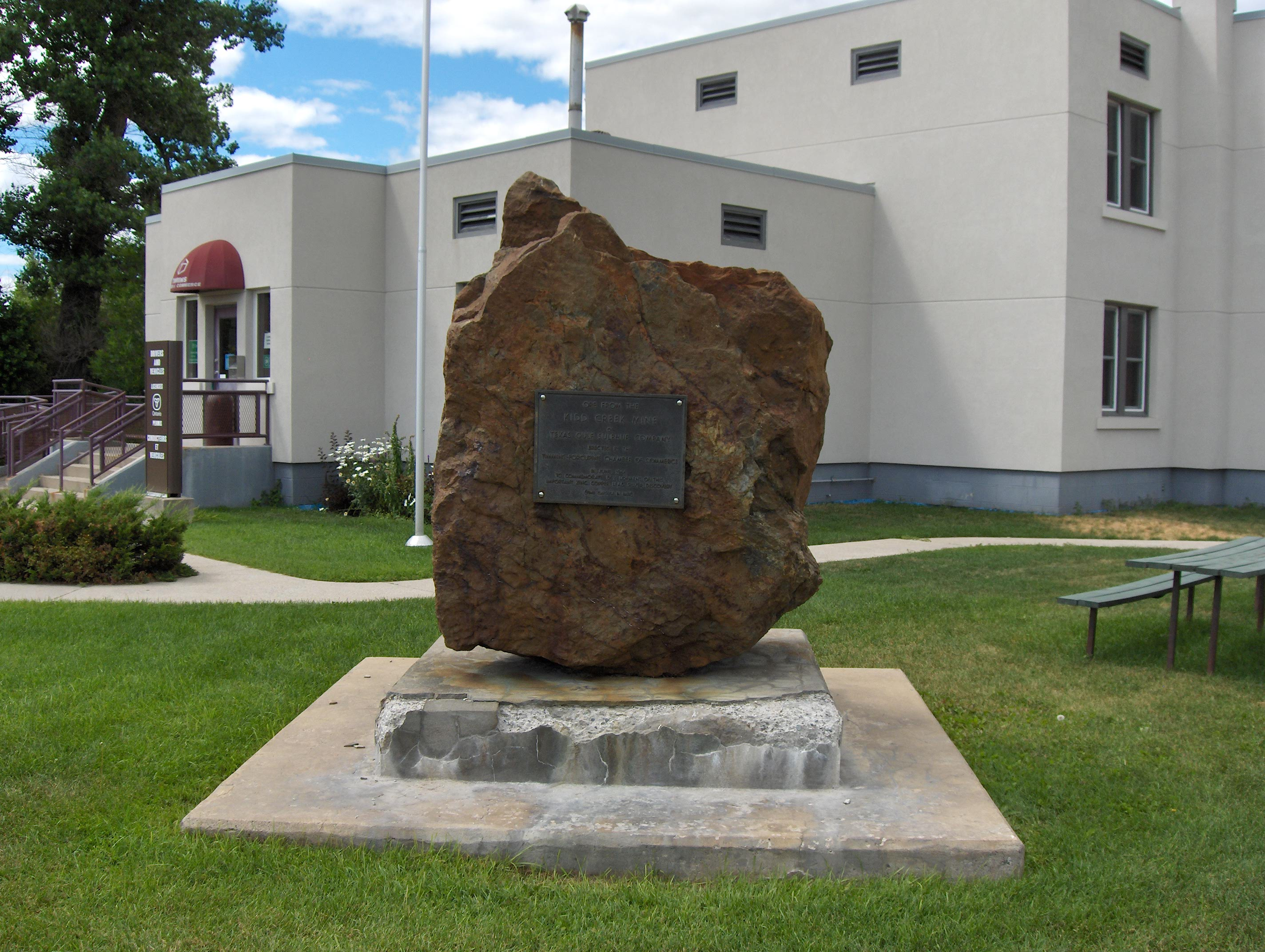
Chamber of Commerce

Some of the main tourist attractions within the city include: The Timmins Museum and National Exhibition Centre, Cedar Meadows Wilderness Tours, Mount Jamieson Resort (formerly known as Kamiskotia Snow Resort), Porcupine Ski Runners Cross-Country Trails and Chalet, Hollinger Golf Club, Spruce Needles Golf Club, the Sandy Falls Golf Club, the McIntyre Community Building and the Timmins Snowmobile Club. Snowmobiling impacts the Timmins economy, as tourists travel from all over North America to explore area trails.

Hollinger Park is one of the city's main recreational spaces. The park is divided in two sections, the north side being the public park area, with the south side having a regulation sized baseball diamond and two soccer fields for more organized outdoor recreational endeavours. The baseball park has been home to the Timmins Men's Baseball League since 1985. Former Timmins resident Shania Twain played a concert at Hollinger Park on July 1, 1999. An estimated 22,000 people attended the outdoor concert.

The Pioneer Museum is located 39.5 km (24.5 mi) northeast of the city centre in Connaught, a community of 400 people. Nearby communities include Barbers Bay, Dugwal, Finn Road, Hoyle, Ice Chest Lake, McIntosh Springs and Nighthawk. Local history in the area dates back over 300 years.

La Galeruche Art Gallery, located at 32 Mountjoy Street North (Centre Culturel La Ronde), provides local francophone artists with a venue to exhibit and sell their work. The building has since been torn down, but plans to rebuild are underway, as of March 2022.

The Porcupine Miner's Memorial tribute is a statue of the miner, head frame and tablets bearing the names of 594 miners killed in mining accidents were unveiled in 2008. The following year, the statues of a mother and two children were unveiled to commemorate those families left behind.

The Timmins Public Library was constructed in 2005 with locally manufactured products, using wood as the main structural material, making efficient use of natural resources while reducing construction waste. The eco-friendly design was recognized by the Green Building Initiative, and the building achieved a 3 Green Globes rating for its efficient use of resources and sustainable development.

=== Sports ===
The Timmins Rock of the Northern Ontario Junior Hockey League represent Timmins in hockey. They are the city's junior A team. And their affiliate, Timmins Majors, of the Great North U18, are the U18 AAA team. They both play at the iconic McIntyre Community Building.

=== Media ===
In 1952, broadcast pioneer J. Conrad Lavigne launched CFCL, the first French-language radio station in Ontario.

Prior to the introduction of cable television to the Timmins area in the latter part of the 1970s, the city's available TV channels consisted of an English-language rebroadcaster of Sudbury's CKSO-TV on channel 3 providing CTV service, and Lavigne's English-language CFCL-TV on channel 6 providing the CBC affiliation, with French Radio-Canada television service provided by a rebroadcaster of CBLFT from Toronto. The CKSO-TV rebroadcaster was converted into a standalone television station, CITO-TV, after the two companies merged into Mid-Canada Communications in 1980.

The Timmins Daily Press is the main English publication, publishing six issues per week. Other French-language media include newspapers Le Voyageur and Le Journal L'Express de Timmins.

== Government ==
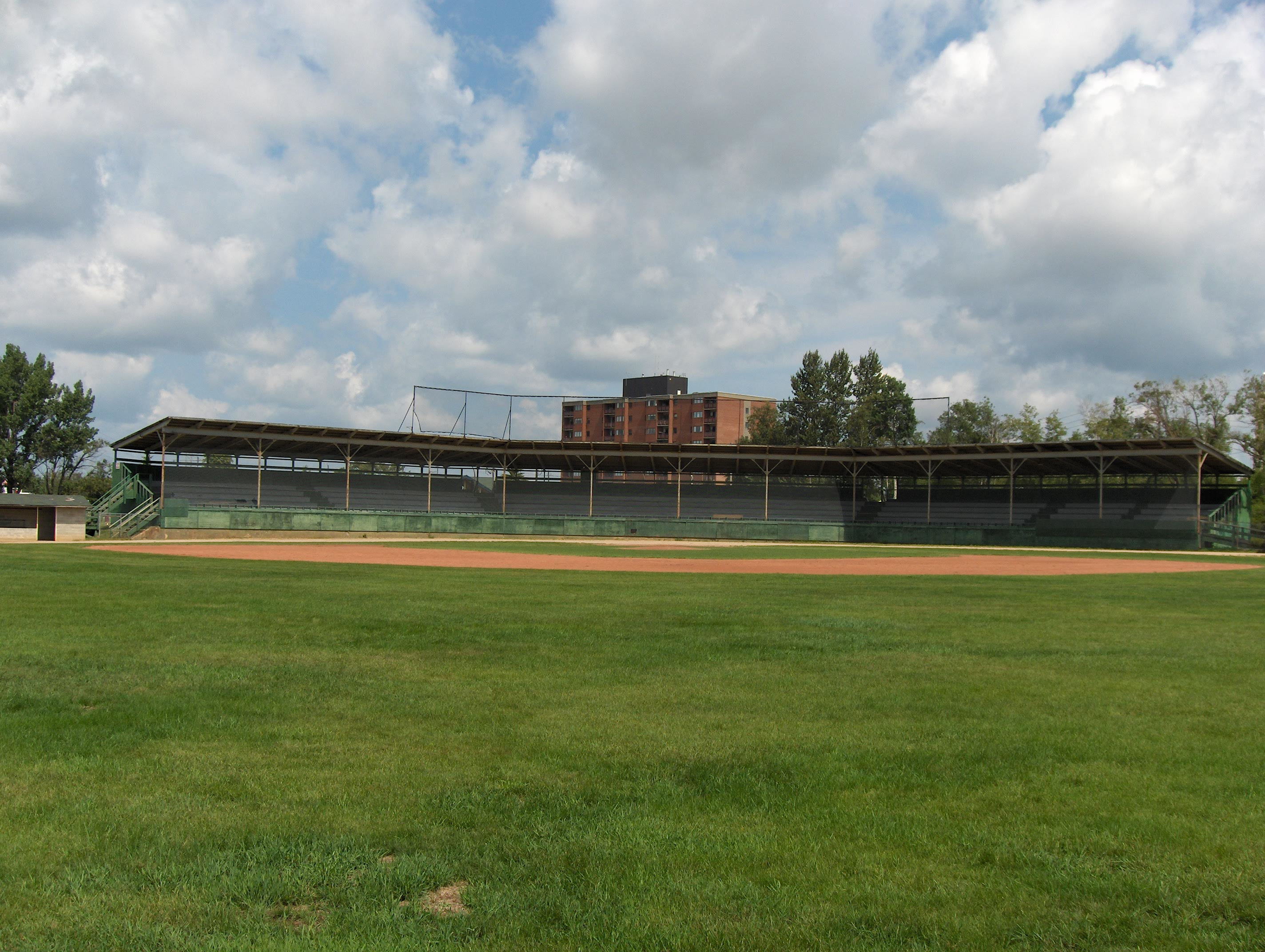
Hollinger Park grandstands

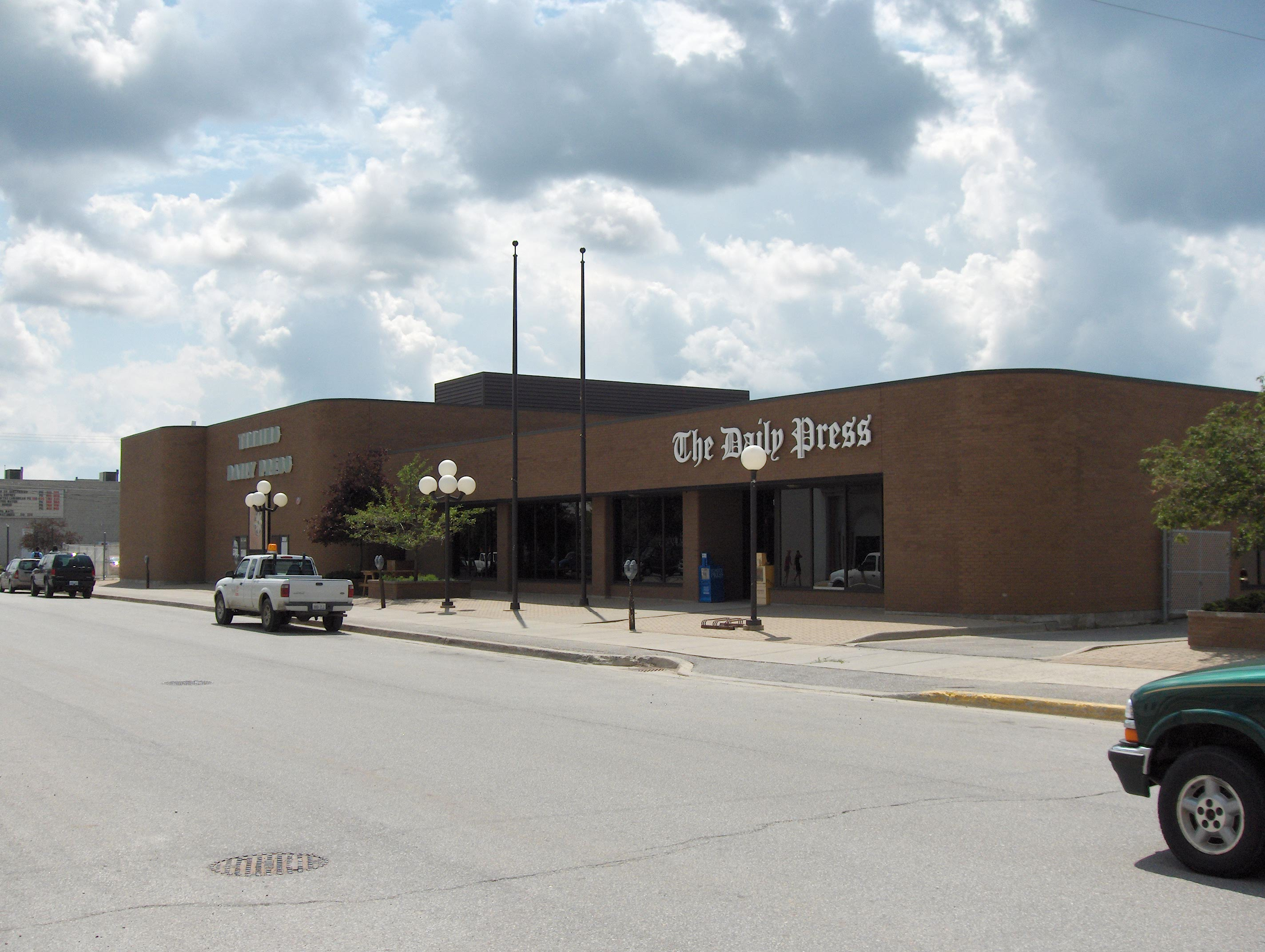
The Timmins Daily Press building

The city's current mayor is Michelle Boileau.

Eight councillors serve with the mayor to complete the municipal government. Those eight councillors are elected to one of five areas of the city through a ward electoral system; rural parts of the city elect one councillor each, while the urban core of the city is in a multi-member ward that elects four councillors (through Plurality block voting). Councillors are elected to a four-year term.

=== Timmins City Council ===
- Rock Whissell, Ward 1 Councillor
- Lorne Feldman, Ward 2 Councillor
- Bill Gvozcanovic, Ward 3 Councillor
- John P. Curley, Ward 4 Councillor
- Michelle Boileau, Ward 5 Councillor
- Andrew Marks, Ward 5 Councillor
- Kristin Murray, Ward 5 Councillor
- Cory Robin, Ward 5 Councillor

=== Provincial ===
The city was represented in the Legislative Assembly of Ontario by MPP Gilles Bisson from 1990 until 2022, when he was defeated by Pirie.

=== Federal ===
The Member of Parliament for Kapuskasing—Timmins—Mushkegowuk is Gaétan Malette.

== Education ==
=== Post secondary education ===
The two main Post secondary institutions in Timmins is Northern College, a College of Applied Arts and Technology and Collège Boréal, which also has a sister campus of Université de Hearst. Algoma University also offers degrees in Social Work and Community Development on the Northern College Campus in South Porcupine.

=== School boards ===
Four school boards serve the City of Timmins:

- District School Board Ontario North East
- Northeastern Catholic District School Board
- Conseil scolaire catholique de district des Grandes-Rivières
- Conseil scolaire public du Nord-Est de l'Ontario

=== High schools ===
- O'Gorman High School
- École Publique Renaissance
- École secondaire catholique Thériault
- Timmins High and Vocational School
- Roland Michener Secondary School

== Healthcare ==
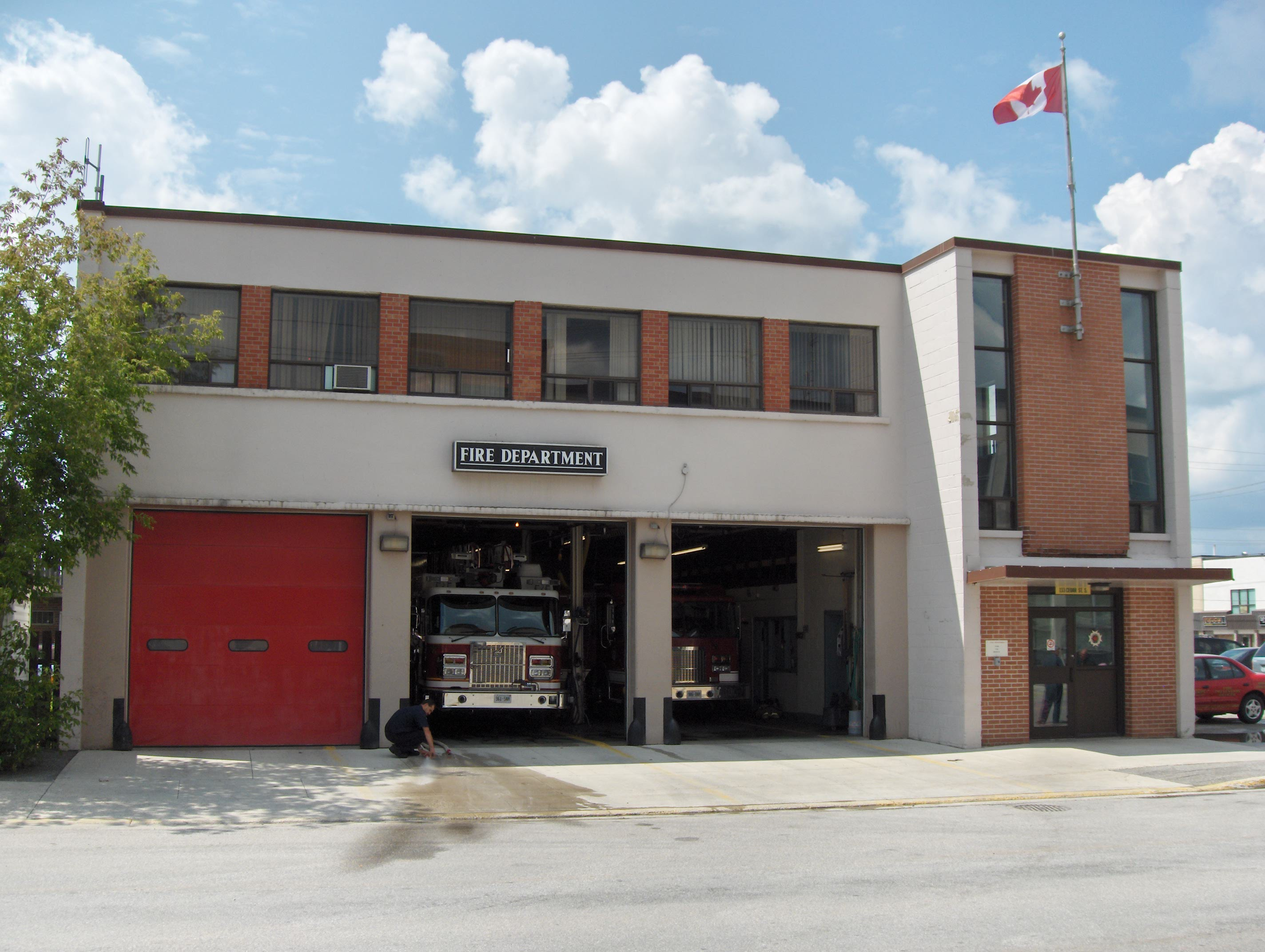
Timmins Fire Department

Timmins and District Hospital (TADH) is an accredited referral and teaching hospital that serves Timmins, Cochrane District, Temiskaming, Sudbury and Algoma Districts. Weeneebayko Area Health Authority also use TADH to transfer patients requiring more advanced care not available in their community health care centres.

The 134-bed hospital was formed in 1988 from the merger of St. Mary's General Hospital and Porcupine General Hospital, now Spruce Hill Lodge, a retirement home. The two former hospitals were replaced in 1996 and 1993, respectively, when the current site was built.

== Emergency Services ==
The Timmins Fire Department provides fire protection, technical rescue services, hazardous materials response and first responder emergency medical assistance to the city. The department was established in 1911, after a devastating fire which destroyed the community of South Porcupine, over 2,200 square kilometres (850 sq mi) of land, 73 people and $3 million CAD in property. Locals gathered inside of a box car owned by the Temiskaming and Northern Ontario Railway.

== Transportation ==
Timmins Victor M. Power Airport is the main regional airport for the Timmins area. Regional ground transportation is provided by Ontario Northland Motor Coach Services operating out of the Timmins Transit Terminal. The nearest communities with train service are more than 100 km (62 mi) away. They include Foleyet to the west and Gogama to the south, which are served by The Canadian, Via Rail's transcontinental passenger rail service. To the north of Timmins, Cochrane is the southern terminus of the Ontario Northland Railway's Polar Bear Express. Matheson and Porquis Junction were formerly the closest stations to the city. Local transit is provided by Timmins Transit.

== Notable people ==
- Alfred Aho, computer scientist, member of US National Academies, professor at Columbia University, Turing Award winner
- Charlie Angus, musician and songwriter for the band Grievous Angels, served as the New Democratic Party Member of Parliament for Timmins-James Bay from 2004 to 2025.
- Paul Bellini, comedy writer and television actor
- Anthony Del Col, Pulitzer Prize-winning writer
- Gilles Bisson, Ontario New Democratic Party Member of Provincial Parliament from 1990 to 2022 for the provincial riding of Timmins.
- Michael Boisvert, actor
- Natalie Brown, actress
- Dave and Don Carroll, country / pop / folk band Sons of Maxwell
- Carlo Cattarello, Order of Canada and Queen's Jubilee Medal recipient
- Lina Chartrand, writer
- Jamie M. Dagg, film director
- Derek Edwards, comedian
- John Labow, actor and television producer
- Maurice LaMarche, comedian and voice actor
- J. Conrad Lavigne, broadcasting pioneer
- Lights (born Valerie Poxleitner), vocalist, singer-songwriter
- Cec Linder, actor
- Frank Mahovlich, National Hockey League (NHL) Hockey Hall of Fame player and Canadian Senator
- Pete Mahovlich, NHL player
- Bruce McCaffrey, Progressive Conservative Party of Ontario MPP
- Derek McGrath actor
- Gord Miller, former Environment Commissioner of Ontario
- Alan Pope, former Progressive Conservative Party of Ontario MPP
- Jim Prentice, former Premier of Alberta, former Member of Parliament from Calgary and federal cabinet minister
- Myron Scholes, Nobel Prize winning economist
- Philippe Tatartcheff, Swiss-born poet and songwriter notable for writing songs in French with Anna and Kate McGarrigle
- Gordon Thiessen, governor of the Bank of Canada from 1994 to 2001
- Roy Thomson, 1st Baron Thomson of Fleet, newspaper magnate, started his empire in the 1930s with the Timmins Daily Press
- Lola Lemire Tostevin, novelist and poet
- Shania Twain, musician
- Bruce Watson, guitarist with Scottish rock band Big Country
- Preston Pablo, musician

=== Notable athletes ===
- Pete Babando, National Hockey League (NHL) hockey player
- Bill Barilko, NHL hockey player and subject of the 1993 Tragically Hip song "Fifty Mission Cap"
- Baz Bastien, NHL goaltender
- Sharon Bruneau, female bodybuilder, fitness competitor, actress and stuntwoman
- Les Costello, NHL hockey player with the Toronto Maple Leafs 1947–49. Later became a Roman Catholic priest in Timmins while continuing to play hockey for the "Flying Fathers"
- Réal Chevrefils, NHL hockey player with the Boston Bruins 1951–59.
- Murray Costello, Hockey Hall of Famer, president of the Canadian Amateur Hockey Association
- Larry Courville, NHL hockey player
- Domenic DiBerardino, Eastern Hockey League hockey player
- Shean Donovan, NHL hockey player
- Paul Harrison, NHL hockey player
- Alex Henry, NHL hockey player
- Art Hodgins, Ice hockey player, inducted in the British Ice Hockey Hall of Fame
- Mark Katic, NHL hockey player
- Kathy Kreiner, Gold medallist, giant slalom, XIIth Olympic Winter Games, Innsbruck, Austria, February 13, 1976
- Laurie Kreiner, Alpine skiing, XI Olympic Winter Games, XIIth Olympic Winter Games
- Jason Gervais, Athletics discus, Sydney 2000 Summer Olympics
- Denis Lapalme, amputee athlete and Paralympic medallist
- Rick Lessard, NHL hockey player
- T. J. Luxmore, NHL Referee
- Frank Mahovlich, NHL hockey player, Canadian Senator
- Pete Mahovlich, NHL hockey player
- Jim Mair, NHL hockey player
- Hector Marini, NHL hockey player
- Bob McCord, NHL hockey player
- Gus Mortson, NHL hockey player
- Bob Nevin, NHL hockey player
- Dave Poulin, NHL hockey player
- Dean Prentice, NHL hockey player
- Eric Prentice, NHL hockey player
- Dale Rolfe, NHL hockey player
- Steve Shields, NHL goaltender
- Allan Stanley, NHL hockey player
- Steve Sullivan, NHL hockey player
- Walt Tkaczuk, NHL hockey player
- Eric Vail, NHL hockey player

== See also ==
- Kidd Mine
- List of francophone communities in Ontario
