= Henry Timmins =

Canadian businessman (1859–1930)

- Born: 17 August 1859; Mattawa, Ontario
- Died: 1 June 1930 (aged 70); Montreal, Quebec
- Spouse: Alphonsine Paré (m. 1881)

Louis-Xavier Henri Timmins (17 August 1859 – 1 June 1930), known commonly as Henry Timmins, was a Canadian shopkeeper who, with his younger brother, Noah, became an influential mining financier. The brothers are considered to be among the most significant founding fathers of the Canadian mining industry.

== Early life ==
Timmins was born Louis-Xavier Henri Timmins, in 1858, to Henriette Mineur (aka Moyer, aka Miner) (1830–1894), a German immigrant, and Noël Timmins (1828–1887), a merchant, who had emigrated from England with his parents, Joseph Timmins (1795–1835) and Marguerite Hirschbeck (aka Aspeck, died 1805), the latter being of German and French descent — her mother, Louise-Amable Morin, was a direct descendant of 17th-Century settlers Noël Morin and his wife, Hélène Desportes, who is often counted as the first white child born in Canada. Both Miner and Timmins maternally descend from several early French-Canadian settler families, include Boucher, Langlois, Guyon, Gagné, Gaudry, Merlot, Proulx and Martin.

Noël Timmins prospered plying the lumber and fur trades, and founded the Timmins General Store in the French-Canadian hamlet of Mattawa, Ontario, where the family had become "thoroughly francicized," according to Lucy Griffith Paré, daughter-in-law of Noah and Henry Timmins' sister, Josephine, and author of The Seeds: The Life Story of a Matriarch, who had encountered them "more at ease in French than in English." Today, Mattawa remains one-third francophone.

Noël Timmins bequeathed his general store and fortune to his sons, Louis-Xavier-Henri and Noé-Antoine, who became better known as Noah. Eldest son Louis-Xavier-Henri was commonly known as Henri and, in the mining industry, is remembered as Henry Timmins.

== Mining career ==
Henry's mining career began with a telegram from his brother, Noah, that led to the pair buying into the La Rose silver claim in Cobalt, Ontario, at the onset of the Cobalt silver rush.

Fred La Rose, a blacksmith, while working for brothers Duncan and John McMartin in the construction of the Temiskaming and Northern Ontario Railway (T&NO) at Mile 103 from North Bay, Ontario– where he had built a small cabin –there chanced upon Erythrite, often an indication of associated cobalt and native silver. (A fanciful story later developed that La Rose discovered the vein when he threw a hammer at a pesky fox.)

Noah Timmins subsequently heard of the claim from La Rose who, at the end of his contract, had stopped at the Timmins brothers' general store in Mattawa, while returning to his home in Hull, Quebec. Noah cabled Henry, who was in Montreal at the time and immediately set out for Hull, where he met with La Rose and offered him $3,500 for a quarter share of the claim, effectively partnering with the McMartin brothers. The foursome soon added a friend of the Timmins brothers, attorney David Alexander Dunlap (1863–1924)– for whom the David Dunlap Observatory was named –as a full fifth partner, after he had won a case lodged by then former Temiskaming and Northern Ontario Railway Commissioner M.J. O'Brien, who had bought out adjacent claimant, Neal A. King, then disputed the Timmins' claim.

In 1910, the five partners incorporated as the Canadian Mining and Finance Company, Limited (later Hollinger Mines), with Noah appointed President. In 1916, officers of the corporation were reported as: "President, L. H. Timmins, Montreal; vice-president, J. McMartin, Cornwall, Ont.; treasurer, D. A. Dunlap, Toronto; secretary, John B. Holden, Toronto; general manager, P. A. Bobbins, Timmins, Ont."

While the family company explored stakes and mining operations around the globe; their greatest development was ever the important Hollinger Gold Mine in Timmins, Ontario, the city that bears their name. Despite Henry's early reservations, Noah had purchased stakes from Benny Hollinger and Alec Gillies, along with several adjacent claims, which were soon incorporated into Hollinger Mines. Noah had first sent his nephew Alphonse "Al" Paré, then a geology engineering student, to assess the Hollinger mine's potential. Following incorporation, Noah then put him in charge of operations at the Hollinger Mine for the initial start-up phase of two years. Hollinger Mines became known as one of the "Big Three" Canadian mines, together with the Dome Mine and the McIntyre Mines.

The Canadian Statesman reflected, in 1968, that, during the early days of the Canadian mining industry:

Men became millionaires overnight, such as shopkeepers Noah and Henry Timmins. They gave up their little store at Mattawa, Ont., and before they were through, these brothers would control the La Rose and the Hollinger Mine, the second largest gold mine in the world!

— Walter McDayte, The Canadian Statesman

== Death ==
Timmins died between 1941 and 1943, when his son of the same name passed away.

== Family ==
Henry's son, Jules Robert Timmins (1888–1971), succeeded Noah Timmins, upon his death in 1936, as president of Hollinger Consolidated Gold Mines. His 1971 obituary in The New York Times commended Jules as "a leading figure in the great iron ore development of Labrador"; he was inducted into the Canadian Mining Hall of Fame, in 1989, for first developing iron ore fields of northern Quebec and Labrador, called "one of the greatest projects in Canadian mining history," and, in the 1950s, for building an "iron ore empire which was truly one of the most imaginative, most difficult mining projects ever undertaken."

The Alphonse and Lucy Griffith Paré Foundation was founded by the nine children of Henry's nephew, by sister Josephine, Al Paré, and his wife, Lucy.

== Sources ==
- The Davis handbook of the Cobalt silver district: with a manual of incorporated companies: "Historical Sketch of Cobalt", by Harold Palmer Davis, Canadian Mining Journal, Ottawa, Canada, 1910, pages 7-14. Retrieved December 5, 2017.
- Changing Places: History, Community, and Identity in Northeastern Ontario by Kerry M. Abel, McGill-Queen's Press, 2006, age 147. Retrieved October 28, 2017.
- The Seeds: The Life Story of a Matriarch, by Lucy Griffith Paré (with Antoine Paré), Les Entreprises de Carpent Perdu Inc., Ste-Lucie-des-Laurentides, Québec, Canada, 1984.
- "The Mattawa Timmins Family in Perspective", by Doug Mackey, Past Forward Heritage Limited, October 31, 2008. Retrieved October 30, 2017.
- "Small Town Links", by Diane Armstrong, September 24, 2015. Retrieved October 30, 2017.
- "Top 10 Mining Events in Northern Ontario", by Stan Sudol, Republic of Mining, March 2, 2014. Retrieved October 30, 2017.

== See also ==
- Porcupine Gold Rush
- Cobalt silver rush
- Timmins Daily Press
