= John McMartin (Canadian politician) =

Canadian politician

John McMartin (September 2, 1858 – April 12, 1918) was a businessman, mining executive and political figure in Ontario, Canada. He represented Glengarry and Stormont in the House of Commons of Canada from 1917 until his death in 1918, as a Unionist Party member.

== Early life ==
McMartin was born at Apple Hill, then part of Charlottenburgh Township, Canada West, and now part of North Glengarry, Ontario, to Allan McMartin and Mary Catherine McDougald (later styled McDonald) (1869 - 1941), daughter of John Angus McDougald (1838–1923), who was Local Registrar of the High Court of Justice, and a son of Major Angus McDougald, a member of the 4th Battalion Glengarry militia on active service during the Rebellions of 1837–1838, and his wife, Annie Chisholm (1843–1917), whose parents were Ranald Chisholm and Catherine McPhee. He was educated in Glengarry area public schools.

== Career ==
In 1883, before entering politics, McMartin was superintendent of construction on the Canadian Pacific Railway where, in 1903, he had allowed the contractor Alfred "Fred" La Rose, a blacksmith, to prospect, along with his railroad work, on the condition that he split any find 50–50 with McMartin who, in turn, would partner with his brother, Duncan (1868 - 1914).

La Rose, while working on construction of the Temiskaming and Northern Ontario Railway (T&NO) at Mile 103 from North Bay, Ontario – where he had built a small cabin – there chanced upon Erythrite, often an indication of associated cobalt and native silver. (A fanciful story later developed that La Rose discovered the vein when he threw a hammer at a pesky fox.) La Rose sold his share to the brothers Noah Timmins and Henry Timmins, effectively creating a de facto partnership between the McMartin and Timmins brothers.

In 1909, the foursome purchased another claim from Benny Hollinger, incorporating Hollinger Mines in 1910, with the addition of a fifth partner, Timmins' ally, the Mattawa, Ontario, lawyer David A. Dunlap, for whom the David Dunlap Observatory is named, after he had shown great value to the enterprise by successfully defending their claim in court.

In 1903, McMartin established himself in Cornwall, Ontario, where he was president of the Labrador Pulp and Paper Company and of the Motherlode Sheep Creek Mining Company, and vice-president of Hollinger Consolidated Mines. In 1917, McMartin moved to Canada's financial center, Montréal, where he died in office at the age of 59.

== See also ==
- Porcupine Gold Rush

== Sources ==
- Prince, Lorenzo] Montreal: old, new, entertaining, convincing, fascinating, Montréal International Press Syndicate, Montréal, Québec, Canada, 1915, pages 208–209.
- Kerry M. Abel, Changing Places: History, Community, and Identity in Northeastern Ontario, McGill-Queen's Press, 2006, page 147. Retrieved October 28, 2017.
- Doug Mackey, "The Mattawa Timmins Family in Perspective", Past Forward Heritage Limited, October 31, 2008. Retrieved October 30, 2017.
- Carter, J. Smyth (1905). The Story of Dundas: being a History of the County of Dundas from 1784 to 1904. Iroquois, Ontario: The St. Lawrence News Publishing House.
