= Benny Hollinger =

Canadian barber and prospector

Benjamin Hollinger (1885–1919) was a Canadian barber turned prospector from Haileybury, Ontario, now considered one of the Founding Fathers of Timmins, Ontario, Canada. He was born April 10, 1885, in Point Alexander, Ontario, the youngest son of schoolteacher John Hollinger and Sarah Sutherland.

With his friend, a professional prospector, Alex Gillies– for whom Gillies Lake is named –Hollinger travelled to the Porcupine region, in the wake of the Wilson expedition which had recently discovered the future Dome Mine site. On October 9, 1909, Hollinger discovered the gold-bearing quartz dike that later became known as Hollinger Mines. Hollinger and Gillies staked three claims each, and one for their former partner, Bernard "Barney" P. McEnaney, who had been unable to join them due to severe sciatica.

Not having sufficient financial resources to develop the capital-heavy mine site, Hollinger quickly sold his claim for $165,000 to the fledgling partnership of brothers Noah Timmins and Henry Timmins and brothers Duncan and John McMartin. Following a successful defense of their claim, Mattawa, Ontario attorney David Alexander Dunlap (1863–1924) joined the two pairs of brothers and, together, in 1910, the five equal partners incorporated Hollinger Mines, for which Hollinger's claim later produced more than 19 million ounces of gold worth over $600 million (Canadian dollars).

Hollinger continued to strike claims and, on February 4, 1913, married Ellen Jane Hill, in Pembroke, Ontario. Together, they had a daughter and two sons.

Hollinger died in Pembroke on November 26, 1919. Following his untimely death from heart failure, The Porcupine Advance reported the pioneer prospector to have reputedly been "pleasant, cheerful, loyal and a gentleman always."

== Legacy ==
Our municipality owes its existence to the initiative and efforts of prospectors by the names of Harry Preston, Sandy McIntyre and Benny Hollinger, who in the early 1900s discovered gold.

— City of Timmins, Ontario

Benny Hollinger was inducted into the Canadian Mining Hall of Fame in 2010.

== Sources ==
- Ontario 400, "Noé Timmins", 400th Anniversary French Presence Project, October 11, 2014. Retrieved October 29, 2017.
- "Reasons to Celebrate", by Diane Armstrong,Timmins Times, June 5, 2009. Retrieved November 2, 2017.
