= Hollinger of Sweden =

Hollinger of Sweden - Swedish: Holmger - may refer to:

- Hollinger Philipson, Swedish prince about 1190, father of King Canute II
- Holmger Knutsson, Swedish prince about 1210
