= David Dunlap (lobbyist) =

American lobbyist

David Dunlap is an American lobbyist, and chemical engineer.

== Life ==
He graduated from Virginia Tech.

He was director of Policy and Regulatory Affairs with Koch Industries.

In 2018, he joined the Environmental Protection Agency, Office of Research and Development. He was involved in the EPA's assessment of the health impacts of formaldehyde, a chemical produced by the Koch Industries. Despite having received the recusal statement from the EPA's Ethics Law Office on October 30, Dunlap signed it on December 19, the same day as the EPA blocked the assessment that warned of the carcinogenic and other medical risks linked to formaldehyde. He notably participated in email discussions regarding the assessment at least twice after he agreed to recuse himself and before he officially signed the statement.

He is vice-president of Global Government Relations at Harsco.
