= Porcupine Gold Rush =

1909 gold rush in Northern Ontario, Canada

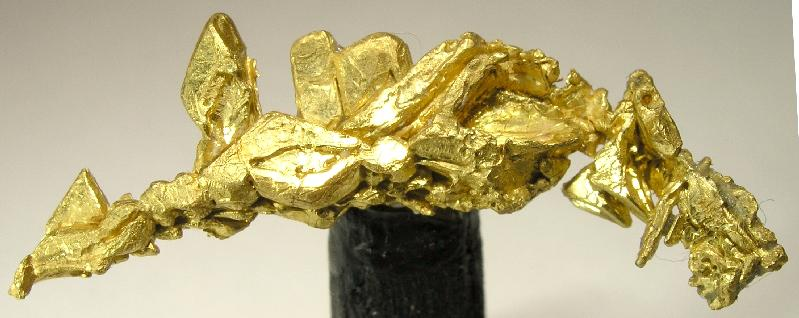
Specimen gold, probably from Pamour Mine

The Porcupine Gold Rush was a gold rush that took place in Northern Ontario, in the Canadian province of Ontario, starting in 1909 and developing fully by 1911. A combination of the hard rock of the Canadian Shield and the rapid capitalization of mining meant that smaller companies and single-man operations could not effectively mine the area, as opposed to earlier rushes where the gold could be extracted through placer mining techniques. Although a number of prospectors made their fortune, operations in the area are marked largely by the development of larger mining companies, and most people involved in the mining operations were their employees.

The mines peaked between the 1940s and the 1950s but still continue to produce gold although the many smaller mines have been consolidated into a small number of larger holdings. By 2001, 67 million troy ounces of gold have been mined from the Porcupine area, making it by far the largest gold rush in terms of actual gold produced. For comparison, the well-known Klondike Gold Rush produced about 12 million troy ounces.

The Porcupine rush, along with the Cobalt Silver Rush and Kirkland Lake Gold Rush, all in the early 20th century, drove most of the settlement effort in northern Ontario.

== Prior to the Rush ==
During the late 17th century, explorers and fur traders established outposts in Northern Ontario (then part of Rupert's Land) to capitalize on the fur trade. The Hudson's Bay Company and the North West Company later developed several trading posts along major routes in Northern Ontario. The rivalry between these two trading companies resulted in the need to get their furs to market as soon as possible and this led to the development of the Porcupine Trail, a trading route that connected the Abitibi River to the Mattagami River and passed directly through present day Timmins.

There were hints of gold in the Porcupine Lake area on a number of occasions before the actual rush started. The earliest recorded mention is by a Department of Mines surveyor, E.M. Burwash, who reported seeing gold-bearing quartz as he travelled through Shaw Township, just southwest of the future goldfields. This was of little interest at the time, as the area was almost inaccessible. A University of Toronto geologist, W. Parks, followed up with three surveying runs in 1898, 1899, and 1903. These crossed through the main gold-bearing area along what was known as 'the Back Road' which has since been renamed "Goldmine Road". On his return to Toronto, he made a now-famous comment that "I regard the region south of the Porcupine trail as giving promise of reward to the prospector."

A major event that led to the eventual rush was the start of the Temiskaming and Northern Ontario Railway (T&NO) running from North Bay through to Cochrane. As it expanded northward it allowed prospectors to support longer surveys deeper into the bush, looking for the minerals that were expected to stretch across all of Northern Ontario. Almost immediately the massive silver deposits in Cobalt were discovered, leading to a "silver rush" in 1903. This, in turn, filled Northern Ontario with miners, assayers, prospectors and all the requirements for rapid development of new mining sites.

== A near miss ==
Reuben D'Aigle was the first to explicitly set out for the Porcupine Lake area in hopes of finding gold. D'Aigle had earlier been a latecomer to the Klondike, arriving after the initial rush but nevertheless sticking it out and eventually striking it rich along the Koyukuk River. After returning south he enrolled in a geology course at Queen's University, and used the library to pore over mining reports for new gold deposits. Discovering Parks' earlier report, he finished his course at the university and immediately set out for Porcupine.

Ignoring the new railway, he hooked up with a Métis guide, Billy Moore, and used the Canadian Pacific Railway's mainline running along the northeastern edge of Lake Huron to the Mattagami River. They started off by canoe and eventually reached Porcupine Lake, exploring around the area for some time. Although he found gold in numerous quartz outcroppings, the tiny flakes he saw were in stark contrast to the nuggets that could be panned in the Klondike, and he remained unimpressed.

Nevertheless, he returned the next summer in 1907 with a larger party including several experienced prospectors and tools needed to break down the rock. Several test pits were dug, but none of them seemed terribly promising. Bob Mustard, one of the prospectors in the D'Aigle party, stated "Quartz veins in Ontario never pay to work." D'Aigle apparently agreed, and they simply abandoned their tools in their latest pit and headed south. Seven claims were staked by the team during their prospecting, but all of these eventually lapsed.

Although D'Aigle's parties were the largest, several other prospectors also made attempts to find gold in the area, potentially after hearing of his efforts. Edward Orr Taylor had camped on Nighthawk Lake three years before a major discovery. The two prospectors Victor Mansen (or Mattson) and Harry Benella (or Penella) set up a mine on the lake in 1907, along with a crude mill. They had managed to produce a single bar of gold by the next year, when a fire burned the mine down. They decided not to bother setting it back up again, and abandoned the site.

== Discovery ==
By 1909 the north was being inundated by prospectors travelling up the new railway and hunting down any hint of riches. As the stories of the Porcupine gold started to filter back to the larger supporting towns along the line, more and more teams headed out for Porcupine. During the summer of 1909 there were several parties in the area; it was only a matter of time before the main veins were discovered.

George Bannerman set out with a partner, Tom Geddes, and started prospecting in the area north of Porcupine Lake. They found an excellent surface sample, staked several claims, and started their return trip to Haileybury to register them. When they arrived they were mobbed by a crowd who formed to see the samples. They received backing from a group in Scotland to develop the plots, forming the Scottish-Ontario Mine. The name later changed to Canusa (Canada–USA) and finally to Banner Porcupine over the years. The mine proved to have excellent surface gold veins, but stopped shortly underground and was never very productive.

In early June, Jack Wilson, backed by two Chicago businessmen, led a party of four prospectors and three native guides into Tisdale Township. On June 9 then came across a dome of quartz sticking out of the ground and decided to trench around it. As Wilson later noted,

As I was examining the seams in the quartz, about twelve feet ahead of me I saw a piece of yellow glisten as the sun struck it. It proved to be a very spectacular piece of gold in a thin seam of schist... when the boys came back we got out the drills and hammers, and that night had about 132 pounds of very spectacular specimens.

Following the vein they found it to be several hundred feet long and about 150 wide, running down the side of the hill. The vein later became known as the "Golden Stairway", and the dome of rock gave its name to the Dome Mine, which would become one of the "Big Three" mines in the area.

Following right behind them was the smaller team of Benny Hollinger, a young barber from Haileybury, and his partner, Alex Gillies. They met Wilson's Dome group, who told them that most of the good sites were already staked as far as four miles (10 km) to the west. They decided to skip those six miles, and moved westward where they came across one of D'Aigle's test pits, the one with the abandoned tools. Gillies' report of the find shows just how unlucky D'Aigle had been:

... Benny was pulling moss off the rocks a few feet away, when suddenly he let a roar out of him and threw his hat to me. At first I thought that he was crazy but when I came over to where he was it was not hard to find the reason. The quartz where he had taken off the moss looked as though someone had dripped a candle along it, but instead of wax it was gold.

The team later found that the bootprint of one of the D'Aigle team-members had pressed directly into a vein of gold.

They staked 12 claims near their discovery and then– because different sponsors had staked them food money –they flipped a coin to determine how to divide the claims. Hollinger won the toss and chose the six claims on the west. Noah Timmins and his brother, Henry, former Mattawa, Ontario merchants who had bought into the La Rose silver mine in Cobalt, purchased Benny Hollinger's claims and opened the Hollinger Mine, one of the greatest gold-producers in the western hemisphere. Noah's nephew, Alphonse Paré, described it: "It was as if a giant cauldron had splattered the gold nuggets over a bed of pure white quartz crystals as a setting for some magnificent crown jewels of inestimable value." On the strength of his nephew's information, Noah paid $330,000 for the mine. Alphonse Paré, a Royal Military College of Canada trained mining engineer, continued working for the family company exploring stakes and mining operations all over the world.

The third great discovery was made by Sandy McIntyre (né Oliphant), an adventurous Scotsman who, years before, gave up his factory job as to become a prospector. He teamed up with Hans Buttner, and together they staked two claims north of Hollinger's. McIntyre's findings formed the basis of a company that would, in 1909, become McIntyre Mines. Although his name made millions, Sandy McIntyre himself had serious drinking problems, and sold his claims to the Timmins brothers before he could grow wealthy from their rich yields.

The Hollinger was the first of the three mines to go into production. In 1935, Timmins wrote that he had set out with a mining party in December 1909, and had followed an old logging road that had fallen into disuse, cutting a new trail where needed. The party arrived at the mine site on New Year's Day 1936, and soon acquired 560 acres of claims, including those of Hollinger, Miller, Gillies and Millerton.

In 1910, Dome Mines began operations by sinking four shafts, the deepest being seventy-five feet. McIntyre was the last of the three to go into operation; McIntyre's partners were constantly quitting due to his behaviour, and it was not until 1915 that any real production started.

== The Rush ==
By the spring of 1910 the rush was in full swing. Thousands of fortune seekers poured into the area, either in an attempt to stake their own claims, or more and more commonly, looking for work in high paying mining jobs. Towns, often nothing more than tent camps, sprung up along the banks of Porcupine Lake, at that point the terminus of the canoe route into the area. Golden City (later Porcupine) and Pottsville sprung up almost overnight, followed by South Porcupine at the end of the lake, closer to the main mining areas. As the area was quickly explored and staked, the main gold producing area was revealed to be three miles (5 km) wide and five long. South Porcupine was incorporated in 1911.

Mines all along the area started production over the next few years, buying plots staked during 1910 and 1911. Seeing the obvious potential of the area the T&NO started construction of a spur line, but was delayed by the constant defection of workers to the goldfields. The province responded by shipping prisoners to work the line, handing secondary duties such as clearing trees and rock. The spur reached Golden City on June 7, 1911, and an official opening followed on July 1. More people poured into the towns, and by the end of the summer there were 8,000 active claims.

== The Fire ==
The summer of 1911 was unusually hot, reaching a record temperature of 107 °F (42 °C) on July 10. There had been no rain for several weeks, and by the evening several small bushfires had been spotted. The threat to the mining townsites was obvious, and starting on the morning of the 11th boats started ferrying women and children from South Porcupine to Golden City at the other end of the lake. Throughout the day the smaller fires combined, and by the afternoon had merged into a single wall of fire up to 20 miles (32 km) wide at points, sweeping eastward on gale-force winds. It swept through South Porcupine around 3:30 p.m., burning it to the ground, and continued to burn its way as far as Cochrane, sending blankets of ash hundreds of miles downwind. Tom Geddes, co-claimer of the sites that started the gold rush, died attempting to save his dog.

The T&NO spur line, unharmed north of the lake, sped relief supplies to the area. Eaton's funded an entire train of supplies, including blankets, tents and supplies, while churches across Ontario responded with clothing and other supplies. As crews returned to South Porcupine they found and collected the dead, including people who had died of smoke inhalation or asphyxiation and were seemingly uninjured. Some 500,000 acres of land was burned. The dead, officially numbered at 73 but thought to be as high as 200, were buried in a new cemetery across the point of the lake from the town, known to this day as Dead Man's Point.

Although most of the Porcupine area mines were destroyed in the fire, the return to production was almost overnight. The Dome founders held an emergency meeting within two days, and funds to rebuild were immediately forwarded.

== Buildout ==
With most of Porcupine wiped out in the fire, development shifted. On Labour Day 1911 Noah Timmins held a public auction for building sites on a relatively flat area of land just west of the McIntyre and Hollinger mines, creating the village that would soon develop into the town of Timmins. By the time it incorporated on January 1, 1912, it had already surpassed both Golden City (now known as Porcupine) and South Porcupine in size. Timmins has remained the real center of the mining area to this day.

By March 1912 the site had grown so large they were able to host a major party for the investors, shipping them in via a new spur line that ran to the site. In its first full year in operation the mine had already produced almost a million dollars of gold, with a profit of $500,000. Over the next five years the quarry mining gave way to shafts, producing $5 million in gold. A rich ore body at the 23-level of the Dome extension was discovered in 1933.

The Hollinger site was also wiped out in the fire, but rains that followed washed off the now unprotected topsoil to reveal many more veins of gold-bearing rock. The mine was processing 800 tons of ore a day by 1914, and that year they were able to announce that they had proven reserves worth at least $13 million, and started paying dividends. In 1916 they were the first mine in the area to install underground electric railways, which paid for themselves in six months due to faster movement of man and ore. Hollinger then purchased the Acme and Millerton properties, creating a single 440-acre (180 ha) plot, and becoming the Hollinger Consolidated Gold Mines in the process.

McIntyre lacked the financial backing of the Hollinger or Dome, and took longer to get into full production. They had constant problems finding reasonable veins, and moved to the north side of Pearl Lake, eventually digging five shafts before finding a reasonable deposit. By this time the company was having trouble paying bills and was often being delivered goods "cash on delivery", but without a strong financial backer this was difficult to arrange. There is an oft-told story in Timmins that the first bar of gold produced by the mine was rushed to the bank so quickly that it was still warm. Things improved dramatically when Sir Henry Pellatt, rich from the Cobalt silver mines, took interest in the McIntyre, and the mine paid its first dividend in 1917. In 1924 the company went on a buying spree, purchasing the Jupiter and Pearl Lake mines, creating a single 626-acre (253 ha) plot. In 1927 they built their Number 11 shaft, whose headframe can still be seen on the north side of Pearl Lake, a symbol for the entire rush.

The initial rush resulted in scores of small mines, but the hard rock mining demanded a high level of investment to be profitable, and many of the smaller sites with less valuable plots failed. There was a major first-mover advantage and many of the surviving properties were consolidated by the larger holdings to produce a single mine that was much more profitable. Although the "big three" were the most successful at this, there were a number of other success stories as well. The Coniaurum Mine was founded in 1924; backed by Cobalt money, they amalgamated several older plots north of the McIntyre area. The mine proved highly profitable due to the nature of the veins, which tended to run vertically. This allowed shafts to be sunk directly over the veins, without requiring the massive amounts of lumber needed to shore up horizontal drifts. The Coniaurum was successful into the 1950s, when the gold ran out. Another success was the Vipond, which had veins similar to the Coniaurum, and used their profits to build up a larger set of holdings.

Starting in the late 1920s and early 1930s a second wave of new mines opened across the area. Low labour costs due to the Great Depression changed the economics of running a mine, and an increased demand due to a lack of faith in paper money led to higher gold prices on the market. A number of sites formerly ignored due to low production were suddenly rendered profitable.

== Peak production ==
By 1932, approximately 75% of the gold mined in Canada came from the Kirkland Lake and Porcupine camps. By the late fifties, the Porcupine camp employed 6,000 miners.

By the 1950s many of the original plots had been mined out, and only the richer veins remained profitable. By the mid-1960s most of the mines in the area had closed. Even the main Hollinger eventually closed in 1968.

Gold prices started to rise, inflation adjusted, for the first time starting in the later 1960s, rising to $150 by the 1970s. By the late 1980s this had increased to an average around $400 a troy ounce. Improvements in mining techniques had by this time dramatically improved recovery rates and cost of operation, and a third wave of mines opened. These efforts included reprocessing of the massive tailing piles left by the previous mining efforts.

Most recently many of the remaining plots were acquired by Goldcorp Inc. (Porcupine Gold Mines).

== Mines ==
=== The "Big Three" ===
- Dome Mines, 1910–2018, 14,537,595 troy ounces of gold produced
- Hollinger Mines, 1910–1968, 19,327,691 troy ounces of gold produced
- McIntyre Mines, 1912–1988, 10,751,941 troy ounces of gold produced

=== Other early mines ===
- Broulan Reef Mine, 1915–1965
- Buffalo Ankerite Mine, 1926–1953, 1978
- Cincinnati, 1914, 1922–1924
- Coniaurum Mine,1913–1918, 1928–1961
- Crown Mines, 1913–1921
- Kam-Kotia Mines
- Miracle Mining
- Paymaster Mine, 1915–1919, 1922–1966, 1.2 million ounces
- Porcupine Pet Gold Mines, 1914–1915
- Vipond Consolidated Mines, 1911–1941, eventually merged with Huronia Belt and Keely Silver Mines to become Anglo-Huronian Limited

=== The second wave ===
- Aunor Mine, 1940–1984
- Banner, 1927–28,1933, 1935
- Broulan Porcupine, 1939–1953
- Concordia, 1935
- Delnite Mine, 1937–1964, reopened as a pit 1987–88
- DeSantis Porcupine Mines, 1933, 1939–1942, 1961–1964
- Faymar, 1940–1942
- Halcrow-Swayze, 1935
- Hallnor Mine, 1938–1968, 1981
- McLaren Mine, 1933–37
- Moneta Mines, 1938–1943
- Naybob Gold Mines, 1932–1964
- Pamour Mine, 1936–1999, reopened 2005, also operated the Hallnor and Aunor Mine

=== Newer ventures ===
- Aquarius, 1984, 1988–89
- Bell Creek Mine, 1987–1991, 1992–present
- Hoyle Pond Mine, 1985–present
- Kidd Mine, 1966–present
- Owl Creek Mine, 1981–1989

== See also ==
- Cobalt silver rush
- Red Lake, Ontario
- Matachewan, Ontario
- Kirkland Lake, Ontario
- Greenstone, Ontario
- Hemlo, Ontario
