= Hollinger Consolidated Gold Mines =

Canadian mining company (1916–1985)

- Industry: Gold mining
- Founded: 25 May 1916
- Defunct: 17 September 1985
- Fate: Merged with Argcen Holdings and Labmin Resources and turned into a holding company
- Successor: Hollinger Inc.
- Headquarters: Toronto, Ontario

Hollinger Consolidated Gold Mines, Limited was a Canadian gold mining company that existed from 1916 to 1985. The mine was discovered on October 9, 1909, by Benny Hollinger, who found the gold-bearing quartz dike that later became known as Hollinger Mines. With his friend, professional prospector Alex Gillies, Hollinger had travelled to the Porcupine region in the wake of the Wilson expedition, which had recently discovered the future Dome Mine site. Hollinger and Gillies staked three claims each, and one for their former partner, Bernard "Barney" P. McEnaney, who had been unable to join them due to severe sciatica.

Hollinger sold his claim to a small syndicate led by Noah Timmins that, in 1910, incorporated as Hollinger Mines in Timmins, Ontario. The five venture partners were brothers Noah and Henry Timmins, brothers Duncan and John McMartin, and lawyer David Alexander Dunlap (for whom the David Dunlap Observatory was named). Hollinger Consolidated was formed in 1916 through the merger of Hollinger Gold Mines Limited, Acme Gold Mines Limited, and Millerton Gold Mines Limited.

The main Hollinger gold mine operated from 1910 until 1968. During that period 65,778,234 tons were milled, producing 19,327,691 ounces of gold, indicating an overall grade of 0.29. The value of the gold produced is placed at $564.7 million. In 1968 the company's name changed to Hollinger Mines Limited, and in 1979 to Hollinger Argus Limited.

Hollinger Consolidated Gold Mines was later acquired by Canadian tycoon E. P. Taylor's Argus Corporation. Argus was taken over by Conrad Black in 1978, and it was subsequently known as Hollinger Inc.

== History ==
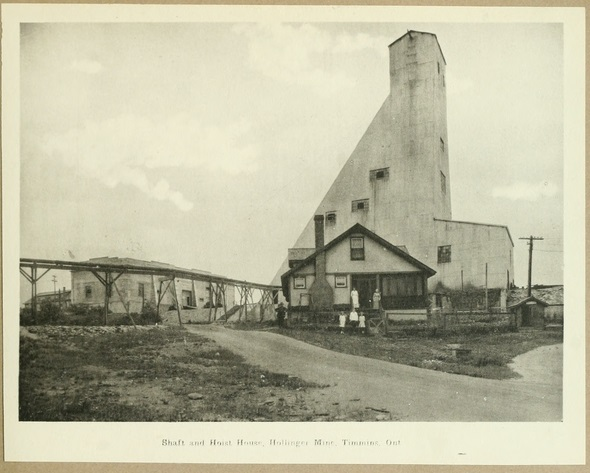
Hollinger Mine shaft, early 1900s

Rumors of gold in the Porcupine area had been circulating for some time, but every attempt to start production had resulted in poor returns. In June 1909, a group of prospectors found a rich vein that would eventually become the Dome Mine, but at the time, it too remained undeveloped. However, the news was now out and prospectors started flowing into the area, resulting in the Porcupine Gold Rush.

In 1909, Benny Hollinger, a young barber from Haileybury, and his partner, Alex Gillies, started prospecting in the area. When they met the Wilson expedition, they were told that all the good lots were staked for at least 4 miles (6.4 km) west. So they went west, past the already staked-out claims, until they came upon an abandoned test pit near Pearl Lake, where Reuben D'Aigle had given up three years earlier. The two were exploring the site when Hollinger dug into a mound that demonstrated how unlucky D'Aigle was:

... Benny was pulling moss off the rocks a few feet away, when suddenly he let a roar out of him and threw his hat to me. At first I thought that he was crazy but when I came over to where he was it was not hard to find the reason. The quartz where he had taken off the moss looked as though someone had dripped a candle along it, but instead of wax it was gold.

They staked twelve claims near their discovery. Because different sponsors had staked them, they flipped a coin to determine how to divide them. Hollinger won the toss and took the higher ground.

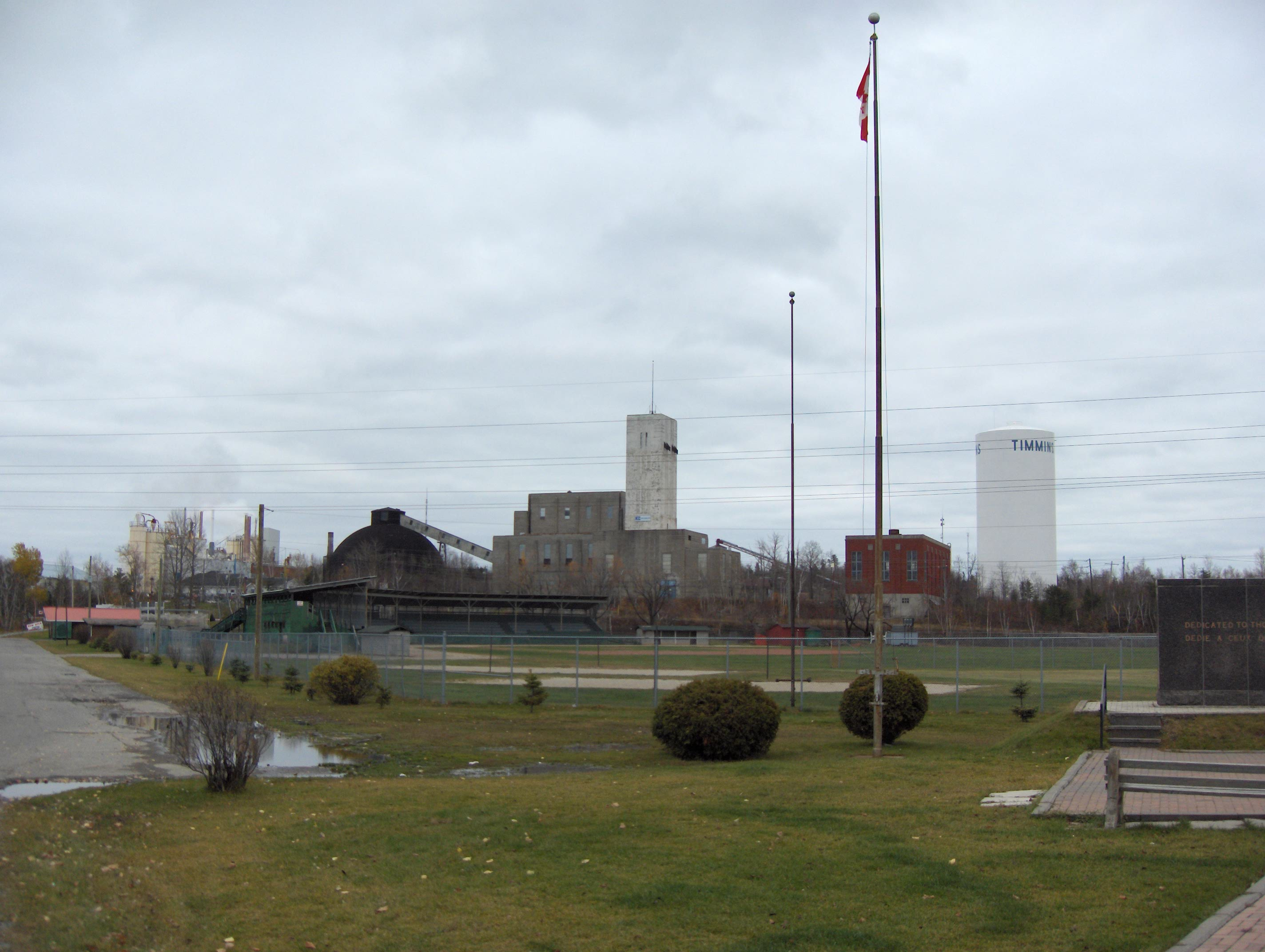
Hollinger Mine. The headframe is the light-colored building in the center, unusual in that it is built of concrete. The dome-shaped building to the left is an ore storage facility.

Noah Timmins, who had been successful with the La Rose silver mine in Cobalt during the Cobalt silver rush, purchased an option on Hollinger's claims and immediately started work on setting up mining operations. He set out in the fall of 1909 from mile post 222 on the Temiskaming & Northern Ontario Railway (T&NO) with a crew of twenty-eight men, two teams of horses, and two tons of supplies. Following an old lumber road, they had to blaze their own trail where the road had become overgrown. They arrived at the mine site on New Year's Day, 1910. Soon, Timmins had acquired 560 acres, which included the Hollinger, Miller, Gillies, Millerton, and Acme Gold claims. The Hollinger was incorporated and the Timmins group formed Canadian Mining and Finance Company Limited.

In May 1911, the surface plant was lost to fire. Then the July 1911 Porcupine Fire devastated the area. However, the torrential rains afterwards exposed more quartz veins. By 1914, the mill was producing 800 tons a day from 54 veins. Electric locomotives were introduced in 1916. Eventually, Hollinger Consolidated Gold Mines encompassed 440 acres.

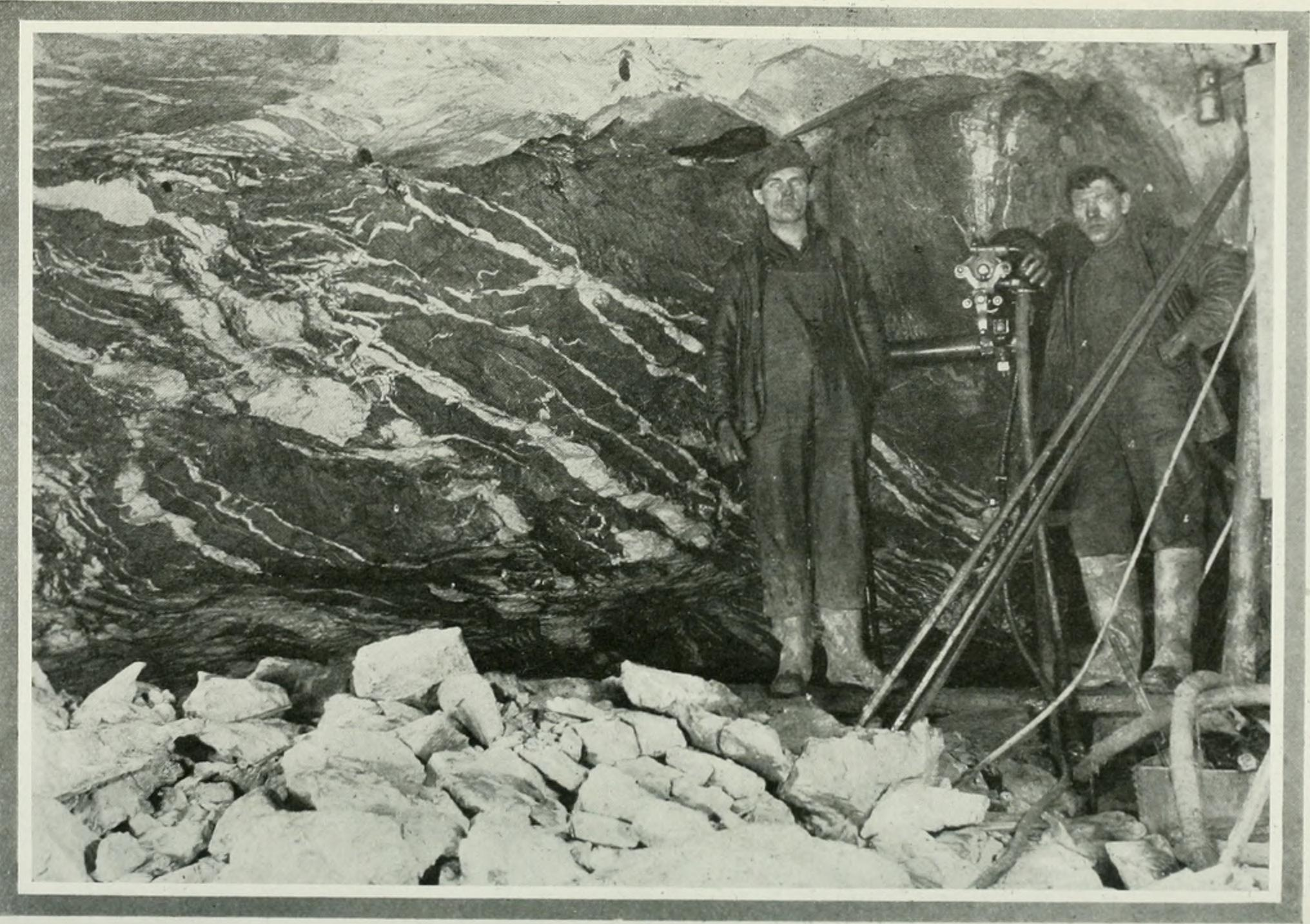
Drill set up in the Hollinger Mine, 1920

By the end of the 1920s, the Hollinger was the largest gold mine in the British Empire and paid annual dividends of more than $5 million. By 1927, a 3.5 mile aerial tramway was in operation.

In the 1930s, Hollinger Consolidated Gold Mines built 250 houses which were located in one area of the Town of Timmins. These houses remained in place right up until the late 1970s. The three room homes were designed and built identical to each other in every respect with the exception of the impregnated tar paper the covered them. Every second home was green with a red roof and the other was red with a green roof.

By 1945, the mine had 350 miles of underground railway, used by 36 electric locomotives, and 1,500 ore cars. The mine was so big that by the 1960s, it had almost 600 miles (970 km) of tunnels.

== Fire ==
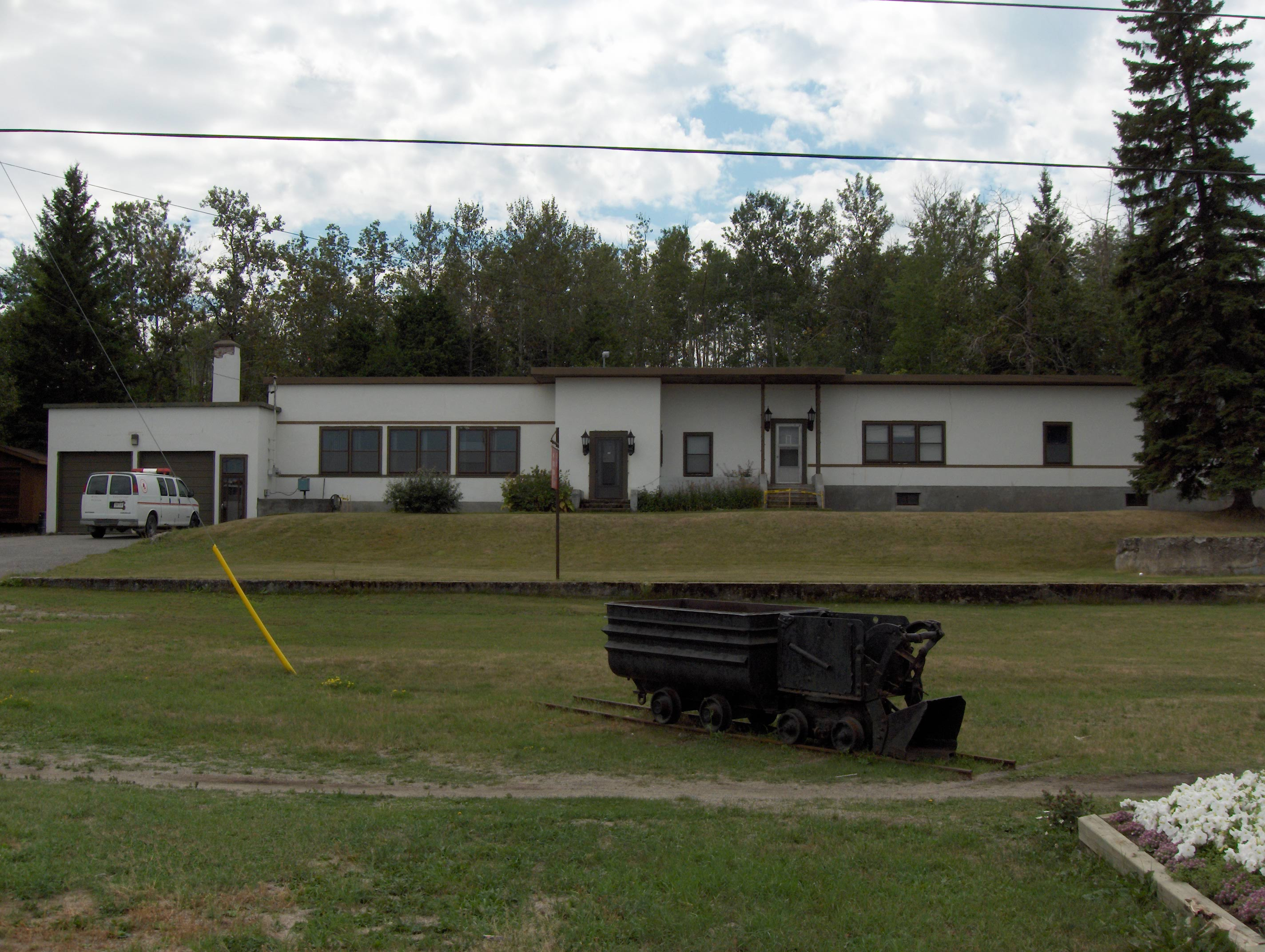
Porcupine Mine Rescue Station

On February 10, 1928 smoke began to curl up from the main shaft house. At first no one could understand how fire could take place in a hard-rock mine. The Hollinger had its own safety inspector, in addition to the government official, but they had not visited all of the more than 100 miles (160 km) of underground workings.

Hundreds of miners escaped to surface, but the news soon spread that others had been trapped on the 550-foot (170 m) level. At that time mined-out stopes were not backfilled with waste rock, but one on the 550-foot (170 m) level had been filled over the years with mining debris such as powder boxes, sawdust and wooden crates. It's believed that the fire started as a result of spontaneous combustion in this area.

There were accounts of individual heroism, and the Department of Mines, the T&NO, many others, and the community itself put forth a effort to battle the disaster and alleviate the suffering. A relief train was sent up from Pennsylvania with rescue personnel experienced in coal-mine fires.

In the end, 39 miners succumbed to the smoke and carbon monoxide poisoning. An inquiry into the disaster recommended that mine rescue stations be set up in major mining camps. In 1929 the Porcupine Camp received the first mine rescue station in the province.

Stompin' Tom Connors, the famous Canadian musician, composed and recorded a ballad about another later fire at the nearby McIntyre Mines (in February 1965), with Lord Thomson's "CKGB Recording" entitled "Fire in the Mine".

== Current ownership/activity ==
The mine shut down in 1968, but was reactivated in the seventies as an open-pit mine.

The mine site was acquired in December 1999 by Kinross Gold, prior to the bankruptcy of Royal Oak Mines. Most of the work on the site has concerned the management of ground subsidence resulting from the collapse of drifts and stopes that were not backfilled. Extensive subsidence has occurred at the Hollinger Golf Course to the southwest of the mine site.

The Hollinger mine site property was purchased by Goldcorp in 2016, and became an active open-pit mine.

== Hollinger Legacy Project ==
In 2012, Goldcorp signed a three-phase land-use plan agreement with the city of Timmins, which schedules mine closure for 2019. Future plans for the site include a new public park featuring Hollinger Lake, a sandy beach, picnic areas, and wilderness trails. The "Hollinger Legacy Project," aims to have completed Phase I by October 2017 and to complete the project in 2019.

== See also ==
- List of mines in Ontario
- Changing Places: History, Community, and Identity in Northeastern Ontario by Kerry M. Abel, McGill-Queen's Press, 2006. Retrieved October 28, 2017.
- "The Mattawa Timmins Family in Perspective", by Doug Mackey, Past Forward Heritage Limited, October 31, 2008. Retrieved October 30, 2017.
- "Top 10 Mining Events in Northern Ontario", by Stan Sudol, Republic of Mining, March 2, 2014. Retrieved October 30, 2017.
