= Reuben D'Aigle =

Canadian prospector (1874–1959)

Reuben Bennett "Sourdough" D'Aigle (1874–1959) was a Canadian prospector who made numerous discoveries in the Klondike, Ontario, Quebec and Labrador. Although successful with several of these ventures, he remains best known for missing the Porcupine Gold Rush by only a few feet, a huge deposit being discovered directly beside one of his abandoned test digs. His last major discovery was a major iron deposit in Labrador, although he was unable to personally develop the site due to the Wall Street crash of 1929, which dried up development funds. He was so well known that his death was mentioned in Time Magazine, who quoted his easygoing take on his losses in Labrador; "I was just there a darn sight too soon, but I have certainly enjoyed myself."

D'Aigle was born in Chipman, New Brunswick. In 1898 he decided to join the Klondike Gold Rush, at this point in full swing and unlikely to make any newcomers wealthy. Taking the slow route, he travelled via ship from New Brunswick around Cape Horn. Travelling up the Yukon River he went past the major goldfields and prospected on the Koyukuk River, a tributary in Alaska. At Cleary Creek he found a small gold camp getting set up, and eventually staked thirty claims in the area, one of which proved to be the richest in the area. When he sold out his claims seven years later he had to wheel his gold to a waiting steamer in a wheelbarrow.

He deposited his winnings in Seattle, and started looking for new fields, but nothing seemed to be worth investigating. He returned east when he heard of the silver rush in Cobalt, Ontario, but when he arrived all the good sites were already staked. Instead of looking for new sites in the area, as he had in the Klondike, he returned south and enrolled in a new geology course at Queen's University. While better learning his trade he pored over survey reports in the library. He eventually found one that seemed enticing, a report of gold in the Porcupine Lake area.

As soon as the course ended he collected a set of gear and headed north. Picking up a Metis guide, Billy Moore, they canoed up the Mattagami River to the Porcupine area and started surveying the entire area. Although they noticed much gold, it was in the form of small flakes embedded in quartz, as opposed to the easily mined nuggets he was used to from the Klondike. This was far less impressive, but he nevertheless decided to return the next year, in 1907, with a larger team to make a more thorough sweep, this time digging into the quartz mounds that dotted the area. Although they were again successful in finding gold, no one in the party considered it worthwhile mining. Eventually they simply gave up, dumped their tools in one of their test pits, and headed south.

It is one of the great ironies of mining history that the pit was only feet from another quartz mound that was described as "dripping" gold. The team that found it later stated that a heelprint from one of D'Aigle's team was clearly visible, impressed into the gold they never noticed.

Stories of gold in the Lower Quebec area had interested Noah A. Timmins and Reuben D'Aigle had been grubstaked by Timmins heard these stories. In 1910 he showed up in Sept Iles and questioned a Montagnais Native, Pierre Rich, about these stories. Using his own capital he hired other Montagnais and prospected for a few years until his money was exhausted. In 1919 he was employed by the Ungava Exploration Company and was the first prospector to identify the huge deposits of iron ore around the Wabush Lake Zone in Labrador, Newfoundland.
