= Gillies Lake =

Lake in Cochrane District, Ontario, Canada

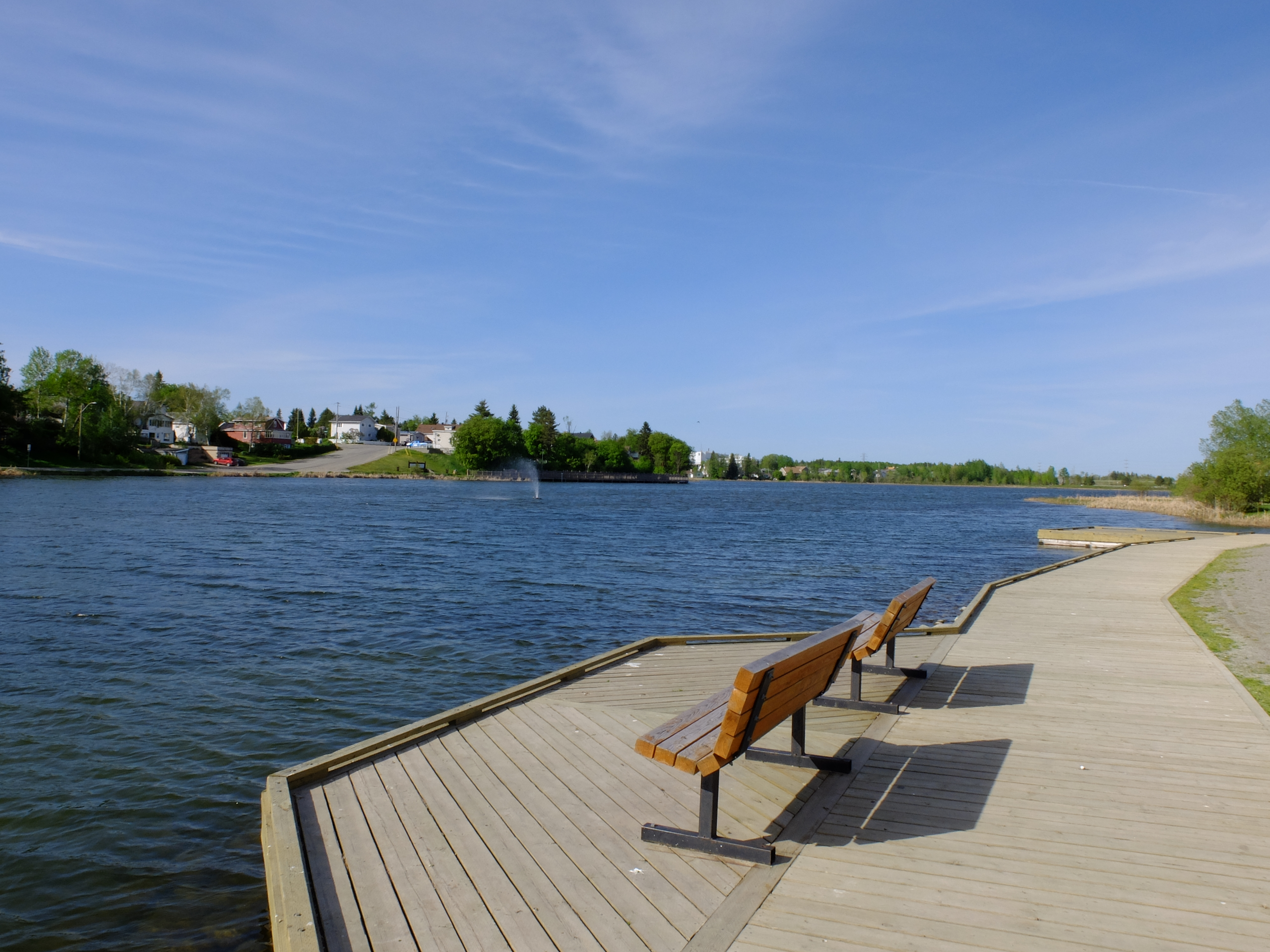
- Gillies Lake in 2018

- Location within Ontario Location within Canada
- Location: Timmins, Ontario, Canada
- Coordinates: 48°28′52″N 81°18′59″W
- Built: 1986
- Surface area: 212,000 square metres (2,280,000 sq ft)
- Average depth: 8 feet (2.4 m)
- Max. depth: 19 feet (5.8 m)
- Water volume: 521,000 cubic metres (18,400,000 cu ft)
- Islands: 0

Gillies Lake is a lake in Timmins, Ontario, Canada. It was developed by the Conservation Authority as part of its lake rejuvenation project in 1986.

The lake features a 2.5 km (1.6 mi) trail, picnic facilities, interpretive storyboards, public washrooms, a boardwalk, wireless hotspots, a recreation field, a beach, sports field, playground area, and a supervised swimming area with change rooms.

Before Timmins had been built up, the beach used to extend along the northwest shore, drawing hundreds of bathers on hot days.

== See also ==
- List of lakes in Ontario
