= David Alexander Dunlap =

Canadian lawyer and philanthropist (1863–1924)

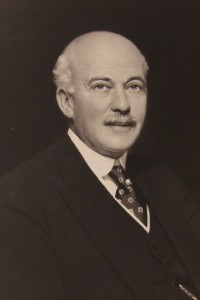
- Born: October 13, 1863; Pembroke, Canada West
- Died: October 29, 1924 (aged 61); Don Mills, Toronto, Ontario
- Resting place: Mount Pleasant Cemetery, Toronto
- Notable work: David Dunlap Observatory, co-founders of Hollinger Mines
- Spouse: Jessie Dunlap

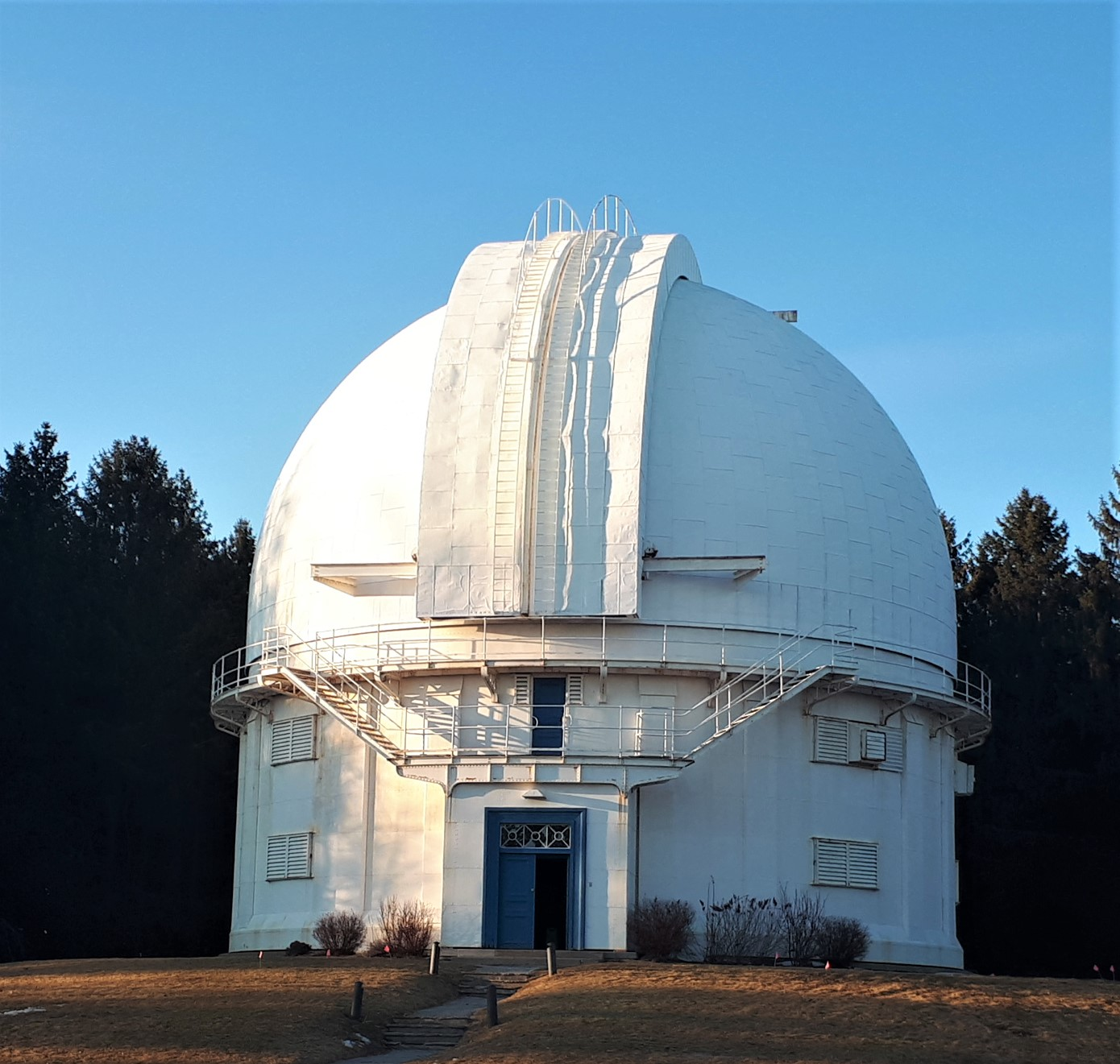
The telescope at the David Dunlap Observatory in Richmond Hill, Ontario

David Alexander Dunlap (October 13, 1863 − October 29, 1924) was a Canadian lawyer, mining company executive and philanthropist. He and his partners acquired an Ontario silver mine called LaRose, which was the basis of the great fortune he came to amass.

As a philanthropist, he became interested in financing the construction of the astronomical observatory at the University of Toronto, which due to his sudden death, was completed by his widow Jessie Dunlap. In his memory, the astronomical facility promoted by astronomer Clarence Chant was named David Dunlap Observatory.

== Career ==
After educating himself in public schools and high school in his hometown of Pembroke, he continued his studies in Barrie, Ontario and Toronto, where he graduated with a law degree from Osgoode Hall. He subsequently moved to Mattawa, Ontario, where he began practicing law. But he soon became involved in mining prospecting with the two Timmins brothers, also residents of Mattawa, and the trio successfully managed the exploitation of the LaRose silver mine, near the town of Cobalt. A few years later, he invested in mines in the Porcupine area, helping to create the mining company Hollinger Consolidated Gold Mines Limited, of which he was secretary treasurer from 1911 to 1919, and vice president from 1919 to 1924.

Being extremely wealthy, Dunlap was a major benefactor of the University of Toronto, St. Andrew's College, the Methodist Church of Canada, and the Royal Ontario Museum. He was also the owner of a 600-acre country estate (named Don Alda, after his wife's middle name), later converted into the Donalda Golf Club. It was here that Dunlap died in 1924, at the age of 61 years.

His widow, Jessie Donalda Dunlap, announced in 1930 that she would finance the construction of an observatory for the University of Toronto located on Yonge Street (just south of Richmond Hill), in memory of her husband and his great interest in astronomy. The David Dunlap Observatory opened in 1935. Jessie Dunlap died at her Highland Avenue home on July 31, 1946. The couple's remains share the family grave in Mount Pleasant Cemetery.

== See also ==
- Clarence Chant
- David Dunlap Observatory
