= Buffalo Mine =

Silver mine in Ontario, Canada

Coordinates: 47.3950°N 79.6942°W

The Buffalo Mine is an abandoned silver mine located in Cobalt, Ontario, Canada.

== See also ==
- Cobalt silver rush
