= Wroxeter (disambiguation) =

Wroxeter may refer to:

- Wroxeter, England
- Wroxeter, Ontario, Canada
- Wroxeter, British Columbia, Canada
