= Fred La Rose =

Canadian blacksmith

Alfred "Fred" La Rose, also known as "Fred Rose" and "Frederick LaRose" (c. 1870 - September 1940), was a blacksmith from Quebec who discovered silver on September 15, 1903 at the future site of Cobalt, Ontario. He is often referred to as the "Father of Cobalt," an unofficial title shared by the province of Ontario's first geologist, Dr. W. G. Miller (1866 - 1925).

Silver had first been discovered near Long Lake (later Cobalt Lake, Ontario), during the construction of the Temiskaming & Northern Ontario Railway (T&NO) from North Bay, by J. H. McKinley and Ernest Darragh, which then became the McKinley-Darragh Mine.

Darragh and McKinley had made their find on August 7, 1903, while supplying railway ties, and kept it secret at the onset, while quickly filing their new claim on August 14. A month later, La Rose, a blacksmith, unaware of the recent silver find, made his discovery while working for brothers Duncan and John McMartin, also in the construction of the T&NO, at Mile 103 from North Bay, where he'd built a small cabin. La Rose had an arrangement with the McMartins to share in any mineral claims that he found in the course of his work, and chanced upon Erythrite, often an indication of associated cobalt and native silver. (A fanciful story later developed that La Rose discovered the vein when he threw a hammer at a pesky fox.)

Mattawa, Ontario shopkeeper Noah Timmins was informed of the claim by La Rose who, at the end of his contract, had stopped at the Timmins brothers' general store while returning home to Hull, Quebec. Noah cabled his brother, Henry Timmins, who was in Montréal at the time and immediately set out for Hull, where he met with La Rose and offered him $3,500 for a quarter share of the claim, effectively partnering with the McMartin brothers.

La Rose was subsequently fully bought-out by the Timmins and McMartin brothers, who, following a protracted legal battle over the land with M.J. O'Brien, added a third partner, lawyer R. A. Dunlop, who then organized the La Rose Mines, Limited, incorporating February 21, 1907. The company remained a closed corporation until 1908, when the La Rose Consolidated Mines Company was organized.

A third discovery, made October 21, 1903, by Thomas "Tom" Hébert– a Hull, Quebec lumberjack who was then working for the J. R. Booth Lumber Company, and had set out to seek employment with the T&NO Railway –became the successful Big Nip mine, and was "the first vein on the property now owned by the Nipissing Mining Company".

Metals discovered by La Rose and, previously, by the team of McKinley and Darragh, and then by Hébert, would spark international interest, culminating in the Cobalt silver rush. The LaRose Mine was closed in 1930, and the location became the main office of Agnico Eagle Mines Limited in Cobalt.

== Fred La Rose interview extracts ==
"Extracts from newspaper interviews with La Rose", compiled by H.P. Davis:

So when I came up to Cobalt I go out whenever I have spare time and prospect. I was sharpening steel and shoeing the horses and mending the skips when they broke. There was not much spare time. It was all bush, all bush then, and there is a fine house where my little shack was. One evening I found a 'float,' a piece as big as my hand, very heavy and with little sharp points all over it. I say nothing, but come back, and the next night I take a pick and look for the vein. The second evening I found it: you can see it on the side of the hill now. Then I go to the boss, Duncan McMartin. and I say. 'Boss. I have a good thing; come with me,' I say, 'You give me good show.' He says, 'Pull a gun on me if I don't.' Then I show him the vein and we stake out two claims, one in his name, another in mine. "We had half share in each. I used to work away at the vein in my spare time. When I had a hole down I would put in a shot and the cobalt bloom and silver would fly. Then Professor Miller he came and said it was silver. I sold my half claims for $25,000. Henry Timmins, he hear of the find at Mattawa and he come to me one night in Hull and we make the deal. I came back to camp and work on the La Rose Extension prospecting. Then I go back to Hull.

— Harold Palmer Davis quoting Fred LaRose, The Davis handbook of the Cobalt silver district

== Legacy ==
Fred La Rose was inducted into the Canadian Mining Hall of Fame in 2003.

== Sources ==
- The Real Cobalt: The Story of Canada's Marvelous Silver Mining Camp, by Anson Albert Gard, Emerson Press, Cobalt, Ontario, Canada, 1908, page 83.
- "Top 10 Mining Events in Northern Ontario", by Stan Sudol, Republic of Mining, March 2, 2014. Retrieved October 30, 2017.
- Canada 400: "400th Anniversary French Presence project in Ontario: Fred La Rose". Retrieved December 7, 2017.
