= Wellington West (provincial electoral district) =

Former provincial electoral district in Ontario, Canada

Ontario electoral district

Defunct provincial electoral district
- Legislature: Legislative Assembly of Ontario
- District created: 1871
- District abolished: 1925
- First contested: 1871
- Last contested: 1923

Wellington West was a provincial electoral district in Ontario, Canada. It was created in 1871 and was abolished in 1925 before the 1926 election.

== Members of Provincial Parliament ==
Wellington West
Assembly	Years	Member	Party
2nd	1871–1874	Robert McKim	Liberal
3rd	1875–1879	Robert McKim	Liberal
4th	1879–1883	Robert McKim	Liberal
5th	1883–1886	Robert McKim	Liberal
6th	1886–1890	Absalom Shade Allan	Liberal
7th	1890–1894	Absalom Shade Allan	Liberal
8th	1894–1896	George Tucker	Protestant Protective Association
8th	1896–1898	James Tucker	Conservative
9th	1898–1902	James Tucker	Conservative
10th	1902–1904	James Tucker	Conservative
11th	1905–1908	James Tucker	Conservative
12th	1908–1911	James McEwing	Liberal
13th	1911–1914	William Clarke Chambers	Conservative
14th	1914–1919	William Clarke Chambers	Conservative
15th	1919–1923	Robert Neil McArthur	United Farmers
16th	1923–1926	William Clarke Chambers	Conservative
Sourced from the Ontario Legislative Assembly
Merged into Wellington Northeast before the 1926 election

== Election results ==
1875 Ontario general election
Party	Candidate	Votes	%
Conservative	John McGowan	1,553	51.63
Liberal	Robert McKim	1,455	48.37
Total valid votes		3,008	73.82
Eligible voters		4,075	
Election voided
Source: Elections Ontario

Ontario provincial by-election, October 1875 Previous election voided
Party	Candidate	Votes	%
Conservative	John McGowan	1,238	50.57
Liberal	Robert McKim	1,210	49.43
Total valid votes		2,448	
Conservative pickup new district.			
Source: History of the Electoral Districts, Legislatures and Ministries of the Province of Ontario

1879 Ontario general election
Party	Candidate	Votes	%	±%
Liberal	Robert McKim	2,026	56.00	+6.57
Conservative	John McGowan	1,592	44.00	−6.57
Total valid votes		3,618	64.61	
Eligible voters		5,600		
Liberal gain from Conservative		Swing		+6.57
Source: Elections Ontario

== See also ==
- List of Ontario provincial electoral districts
- Canadian provincial electoral districts
