= Robert McKim (Ontario politician) =

Canadian politician

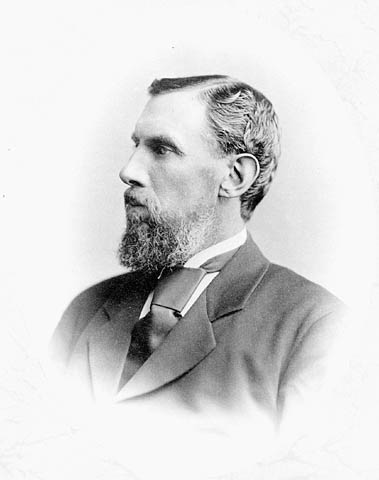

Ontario MPP
- In office 1871–1886
- Preceded by: New riding
- Succeeded by: Absalom Shade Allan
- Constituency: Wellington West
- In office 1867–1871
- Preceded by: Riding established
- Succeeded by: John McGowan
- Constituency: Wellington North

Personal details
- Born: c. 1828 Sligo, Ireland
- Died: 20 January 1900 (aged 71) Guelph, Ontario
- Party: Liberal
- Spouse: Margaret Shannon (m. 1852)
- Occupation: Farmer

Robert McKim (c. 1828 – January 20, 1900) was an Ontario, Canada, farmer and political figure. He represented Wellington North in the Legislative Assembly of Ontario as a Liberal member from 1867 to 1872 and Wellington West from 1879 to 1886.

He was born and grew up in Sligo, Ireland. In 1852, he married Margaret Shannon. He was a justice of the peace and also served as reeve for Peel Township. McKim resigned his seat in the provincial legislature in 1874 to compete unsuccessfully in Wellington Centre for a seat in the federal parliament. He was defeated in the 1875 provincial election and reelected in 1878. In 1884, McKim turned over to the speaker of the house a large sum of money that he had been paid to vote against the government. He died in Guelph in 1900.

== Electoral history ==
1867 Ontario general election: Wellington North
Party	Candidate	Votes	%
Liberal	Robert McKim	1,434	51.29
Conservative	Mr. Beattie	1,362	48.71
Total valid votes		2,796	81.04
Eligible voters		3,450	
Liberal pickup new district.			
Source: Elections Ontario

1871 Ontario general election: Wellington North
Party	Candidate	Votes	%	±%
Liberal	Robert McKim	1,531	63.53	+12.24
Conservative	Mr. Cross	879	36.47	−12.24
Turnout		2,410	59.40	−21.64
Eligible voters		4,057		
Liberal hold		Swing		+12.24
Source: Elections Ontario

1875 Ontario general election: Wellington West
Party	Candidate	Votes	%
Conservative	John McGowan	1,553	51.63
Liberal	Robert McKim	1,455	48.37
Total valid votes		3,008	73.82
Eligible voters		4,075	
Election voided
Source: Elections Ontario

Ontario provincial by-election, October 1875: Wellington West Previous election voided
Party	Candidate	Votes	%
Conservative	John McGowan	1,238	50.57
Liberal	Robert McKim	1,210	49.43
Total valid votes		2,448	
Conservative pickup new district.			
Source: History of the Electoral Districts, Legislatures and Ministries of the Province of Ontario
