= James McEwing =

Canadian politician

Ontario MPP
- In office 1908–1911
- Preceded by: James Tucker
- Succeeded by: William Clarke Chambers
- Constituency: Wellington West

Personal details
- Born: April 17, 1850 Huron Township, Canada West
- Died: August 15, 1921 (aged 71) Wellington, Ontario
- Party: Liberal
- Spouse: Louisa Samantha Atkinson (m. 1881)
- Occupation: Farmer

James McEwing (April 17, 1850 – August 8, 1921) was a farmer and politician in Ontario, Canada. He represented Wellington West in the Legislative Assembly of Ontario from 1908 to 1911 as a Liberal.

The son of James McEwing and Agnes M. Matheson, both natives of Scotland, he was born in Tuckersmith township, Huron County and was educated there. In 1881, he married Louisa Samantha Atkinson. McEwing was a director for the town telephone company and secretary-treasurer and manager for the Peel and Maryborough Mutual Fire Company. He served on the municipal council from 1892 to 1893 and on the Wellington County council from 1897 to 1898 and from 1901 to 1901. McEwing was county warden in 1905. He ran unsuccessfully for the Wellington West seat in 1902.

His son Ross also served in the Ontario assembly.
