= Robert Neil McArthur =

Canadian politician from Ontario

Member of the Ontario Provincial Parliament for Wellington West
- In office October 20, 1919 – May 10, 1923
- Preceded by: William Clarke Chambers
- Succeeded by: William Clarke Chambers

Personal details
- Party: United Farmers

Robert Neil McArthur was a Canadian politician from Ontario. He represented Wellington West in the Legislative Assembly of Ontario from 1919 to 1923.

== See also ==
- 15th Parliament of Ontario
