= James Ross (Ontario politician) =

Canadian politician

Member of the Canadian Parliament for Wellington Centre
- In office 1869–1874
- Preceded by: Thomas Sutherland Parker
- Succeeded by: George Turner Orton

Personal details
- Born: October 1, 1817 Arnage, Aberdeenshire, Scotland
- Died: July 16, 1895 (aged 77) Guelph, Ontario, Canada
- Party: Liberal

James Ross (October 1, 1817 – July 16, 1895) was an Ontario farmer and political figure. He represented Wellington Centre in the House of Commons of Canada as a Liberal member from 1869 to 1874.

He was born in Arnage, Aberdeenshire, Scotland in 1817, the son of John Leith Ross, and was educated at Marischal College there and came to Upper Canada in 1836. He was reeve for Nichol township from 1854 to 1859 and warden for Wellington County from 1858 to 1859. He was elected to the Legislative Assembly of the Province of Canada in an 1859 by-election in the North riding of Wellington and served until 1861. Ross also served as Crown Lands Agent. He was first elected to the federal parliament in 1869 after the death of Thomas Sutherland Parker. He lived in Cumnock and later Guelph. Ross died in Guelph at the age of 77.
