= William Clarke Chambers =

Canadian politician

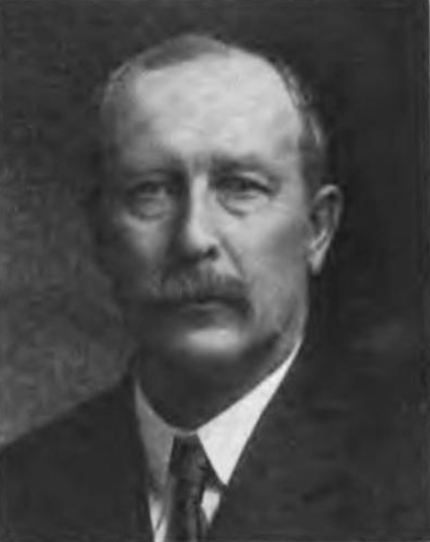

Member of Provincial Parliament
- Constituency: Wellington West
- In office 1911–1919
- In office 1924–1926

Personal details
- Born: December 17, 1862 Wroxeter, Canada West
- Died: February 1, 1958 (aged 95) Toronto, Ontario
- Party: Conservative
- Spouse: Jennie Viola McAndless (m. 1891)
- Children: 9
- Occupation: Railway contractor, farmer, politician

William Clarke Chambers (December 17, 1862 – February 1, 1958) was a Canadian railway contractor, farmer and politician in Ontario. He represented Wellington West in the Legislative Assembly of Ontario from 1911 to 1919 and from 1924 to 1926 as a Conservative.

The son of Andrew Chambers and Lucy Clarke, he was born in Wroxeter and grew up on the family farm. He was educated at public schools in Blanchard and Harriston. Chambers worked on various construction projects for the Grand Trunk Railway, the Canadian Pacific Railway, the Canadian National Railway, the Temiskaming and Northern Railway, the Canadian Northern Railway, the Manitoulin & North Shore Railway and the Canada Atlantic Railway. He was superintendent for construction of an electric railway in Niagara Falls and worked on the construction of a water filtration plant for Toronto. Chambers was also employed in lumber and mining, being one of the original owners of the Nipissing Mine.

In 1891, he married Jennie Viola McAndless; the couple had three sons and six daughters.

He died at his home in Toronto on February 1, 1958.
