= Cobalt silver rush =

Mining history

The Cobalt silver rush was a silver rush in Ontario, Canada that began in 1903 when huge veins of silver were discovered by workers on the Temiskaming and Northern Ontario Railway (T&NO) near the Mile 103 post. By 1905 a full-scale silver rush was underway, and the town of Cobalt, Ontario sprang up to serve as its hub. By 1908 Cobalt produced 9% of the world's silver, and in 1911 produced 31,507,791 ounces of silver. However, the good ore ran out fairly rapidly, and most of the mines were closed by the 1930s. There were several small revivals over the years, notably in World War II and again in the 1950s, but both petered out and today there is no active mining in the area. In total, the Cobalt area mines produced between 405 and 460 million troy ounces of silver.

The Cobalt Rush was instrumental in opening northern Ontario for mineral exploration. Prospectors fanned out from Cobalt, and soon caused the nearby Porcupine Gold Rush in 1909, and the Kirkland Lake Gold Rush of 1912. Much of the settlement in northern Ontario outside the Clay Belt owes its existence indirectly to the Cobalt Rush.

== Before the rush ==
In the late 19th century the Ontario government started a program to establish settlements in the Clay Belt, a band of rich soil running north of Lake Temiskaming. The government wanted to open what was then known as "New Ontario", after it had been merged into the province from formerly Northwest Territories land. At the time, direct settlement to farms was still fairly widespread, and the towns of New Liskeard and Haileybury formed in the 1890s as the hubs of this activity.

The settlements generated some commercial interest in building a railway from North Bay to New Liskeard, but these plans ended when the rate of settlement dwindled at the turn of the 20th century. In 1902 the government decided to take over the project and started development of the T&NO, contracting out construction to a wide array of companies. By the summer of 1903 the line was about 100 miles (160 km) long and was approaching Haileybury.

== Discovery ==
James J. McKinley and Ernest Darragh were contractors supplying ties to the T&NO along Mile 103 from North Bay. On the banks of Long Lake (now called Cobalt Lake), south of Haileybury, they noticed metal in a road cut. On August 30, 1903 they staked a claim on a timber limit owned by John Rudolphus Booth, and sent several samples to an assayer in Montreal. These proved to have 4,000 ounces of silver per ton. According to Barnes, "this was one of the richest properties in the area." A mine followed three years later.

Fred La Rose, a blacksmith also working as a contractor on the railway near the Mile 103. About two weeks after McKinley and Darragh, LaRose noticed erythrite along the tracks. LaRose noted "One evening I found a float, a piece as big as my hand, with little sharp points all over it. I say nothing but come back and the next night I take pick and look for the vein. The second evening I found it." He and his boss, Duncan McMartin staked claims on September 3, 1903.

LaRose and the McMartin brothers were not sure what the metal was though. LaRose started on his way back to his home in Hull, Quebec and stopped on the way in Mattawa. There, he visited a store owned by locals Noah Timmins and his brother Henry. Larose showed the samples to Noah before moving on to Hull. Henry was in Montreal at the time, so Noah cabled him, telling him about LaRose's find. Henry immediately set out for Hull, meeting LaRose and offering him $3,500 for half of the claim. Some time later a story developed that he found a vein when he threw a hammer at a pesky fox.

In October 1903, a timber cruiser called Tom Herbert, staked the east side of Long Lake, 104 miles north of North Bay. He showed samples to Arthur Ferland in Haileybury, the brother-in-law of the Timmins brothers. Ferland formed a syndicate with the railway engineers T. Chambers and R. Gilbraith, and acquired 846 acres (3.42 km^{2}) of claims, including Herbert's. The syndicate promptly sold 843 acreas for $1 million to Ellis P. Earle, which developed into the Nipissing Mine. Earle's claim included the Little Vein and "silver nuggets the size of acorns." The remaining 3 acres became the Chambers-Ferland Mine.

Larose's samples were sent to Thomas W. Gibson, the Director of the Ontario Dept. of Mines. Gibson identified the mineral in the samples as niccolite. Gibson sent the samples to Willet G. Miller, a professor of geology at Queen's University. With the samples Gibson included a note which stated that "If the deposit is of any considerable size it will be a valuable one on account of the high percentage of nickel which this mineral contains. I think it will be almost worth your while to pay a visit to the locality before navigation closes." Miller visited the area in Oct. and discovered a number of veins, reporting "pieces of native silver as big as stove lids and cannon balls." He noted the silver was located within veins cutting through the Nipissing sills of the Huronian Supergroup.

== Rush ==
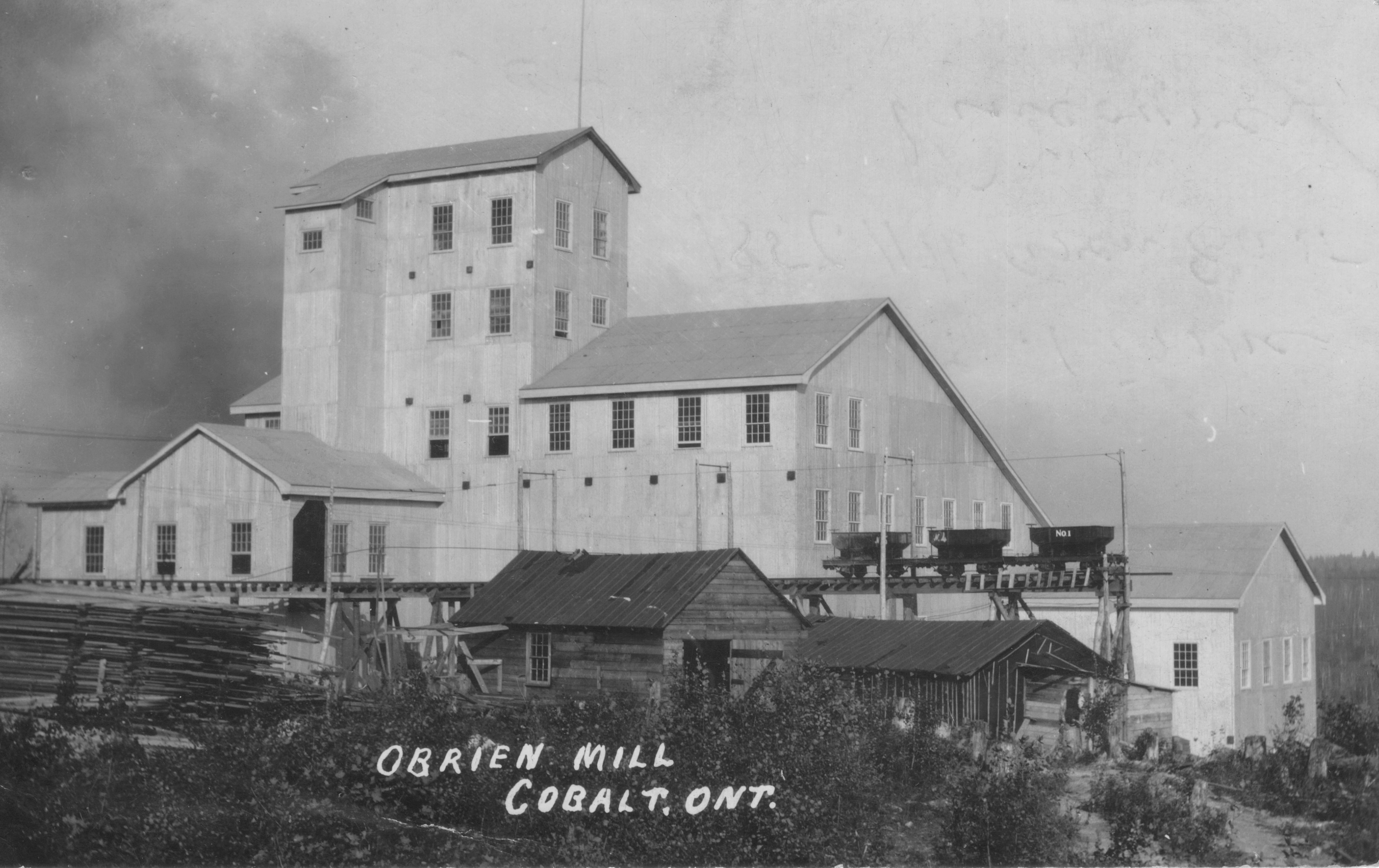
The O'Brien Mine in Cobalt.

The O'Brien Mine started operations in 1903. William Trethewey and Alex Longwell arrived in May 1904 and set out prospecting the area of Sasaginiga Lake. Trethewey staked two claims on some veins, one of which became the Coniagas Mine since it showed signs of copper, nickel, silver and arsenic. Longwell staked a claim which became the Buffalo Mine. In 1905, William Henry Drummond staked claims at the east end of Kerr Lake, which became the Drummond Mine. Henry Pellatt's Cobalt Lake Mining Company developed the vein system under Cobalt Lake, in between the Larose Mine and the McKinley-Darragh Mine. These veins were up to ten feet wide and produced silver at 4,206 ounces per ton.

In 1904, 57 miners were able to ship 58 tons of high-grade ore. When travel re-opened in the spring of 1905 word was out that there was silver at Cobalt Station. Prospectors and developers started pouring into the campsite, and by the end of the year 16 operating mines, employing 438 men, shipped $1,366,000 worth of ore. The next year another $2,000,000 worth of ore was shipped.

The top producing mines in 1907, included Coniagas, Nipissing, O'Brien, Buffalo, Trethewey, Larose, Silver Queen, Kerr Lake Foster, Temiskaming and Hudson Bay, Green-Meehan, McKinley-Darragh, Nova Scotia, Townsite and Right-of-Way. The Nipissing Mine was the top producer. Additionally, 9 stamp mills were in operation.

The Nipissing Mine introduced the use of high-pressure water to remove the overburden. By 1913, Cobalt Lake was polluted and the lake was drained to expose any veins.

Although one of the richest veins was known as early as 1904, development was slowed by disagreements among the shareholders. These were finally worked out and mining the "Lawson Vein" started in 1908. Once mining was underway it became clear that the vein was incredibly large, as much as 10,000 tons of processed silver, making it the largest single find in the world to this day. It is better known today as the "Silver Sidewalk".

The rush reached its peak in 1911, producing 30 million ounces of silver. The town had grown considerably by 1912, and had a population of between 10,000 and 15,000, with 3500 working the mines. By 1913, the deepest silver mine was operated by Beaver Consolidated Mines Ltd.

== Decline and possible resurgence ==
World War I made labour hard to come by. At the end of the war, Cobalt had a population of about 7,000 or 8,000, and the camp had reached its 10,000th ounce of silver produced.

By 1932 only one mine remained open. The Larose and Nipissing had closed in 1930. In the World War II era and immediately thereafter, cobalt became a valuable mineral in its own right, and a number of operations opened to process the tailings again, this time for the cobalt. Ten mines were in operation after the war.

Increasing silver values and better mining processes started to make the area profitable, and the 1950s saw a brief resurgence of mining. Most of these closed by the 1970s, and the few remaining ones by the early 1980s.

By the 1980s, the area had produced between 405 and 420 million ounces of silver. By the 1970s, over 20,000 tonnes(t) of cobalt, 7000 t of nickel and 2000 t of copper, were produced throughout the 85 year history of the Cobalt mining camp, with production peaking in 1911.

By 2017 however, several cobalt exploration companies were focusing on the area around Cobalt, as one alternative to cobalt mining in the politically-unstable Democratic Republic of Congo. Major companies that require this mineral for their batteries were searching for ethically-sourced product. Silver was selling for US$17 per ounce in late October 2017, down significantly from its peak of US$50 in 2012, but cobalt was at about US$30 per pound, up significantly from the US$10 price in late 2015. The prices will increase according to Gino Chitaroni, the president of the Northern Prospectors' Association. He also predicted that the area around Cobalt would be a primary source of both silver and cobalt. "It's spectacular ... We have the infrastructure. We have a historic mining area. It puts us a step up on anywhere [else] in the world."

In the 2020s, Electra Battery Materials started developing a black mass battery recycling plant located near Cobalt. In June 2026, the plant was to be operational at the end of 2027 would eventually have a capacity of 6,500 tonnes of battery-grade cobalt.

== See also ==
- Greenstone, Ontario
- Hemlo, Ontario
- Kirkland Lake
- Matachewan, Ontario
- Red Lake, Ontario
