= George McQuibban =

Canadian politician

Ontario MPP
- In office 1934–1937
- Preceded by: Riding re-established
- Succeeded by: Ross McEwing
- Constituency: Wellington North
- In office 1926–1934
- Preceded by: Riding re-established
- Succeeded by: Riding abolished
- Constituency: Wellington Northeast

Personal details
- Born: September 2, 1886 Ingersoll, Ontario
- Died: January 30, 1937 (aged 50) Toronto, Ontario
- Party: Liberal
- Occupation: Physician

George Alexander McQuibban (September 2, 1886 – January 30, 1937) was a physician and political figure in Ontario. A Liberal member of the Legislative Assembly of Ontario, he represented Wellington Northeast from 1926 to 1934 and Wellington North from 1934 to his death in 1937.

He was born in Ingersoll, the son of James McQuibban and Helen Robertson, and was educated in Harriston and at the University of Toronto. He set up practice in Alma in partnership with his brother James.
