= Thomas Sutherland Parker =

Canadian politician

Member of the Canadian Parliament for Wellington Centre
- In office 1867–1868
- Succeeded by: James Ross

Personal details
- Born: April 3, 1829 Bradford, Upper Canada
- Died: October 24, 1868 (aged 39)
- Party: Liberal

Thomas Sutherland Parker (April 3, 1829 – October 24, 1868) was a medical doctor and political figure in Ontario, Canada. He represented Wellington Centre in the House of Commons of Canada as a Liberal member from 1867 to 1868.

He was born in Bradford in Upper Canada in 1829, the son of Robert Parker. He studied medicine at Victoria College in Cobourg and Jefferson Medical College in Philadelphia, became a doctor and practised medicine in Guelph. Parker was elected to the Legislative Assembly of the Province of Canada for the North riding of Wellington in 1863. He was elected to the 1st Canadian Parliament in 1867 and died in Guelph in 1868 while still in office, as a result of an accidental fall through a bridge after a visit to a sick child near Rockwood.
