= Sledgehammer =

Heavy striking tool

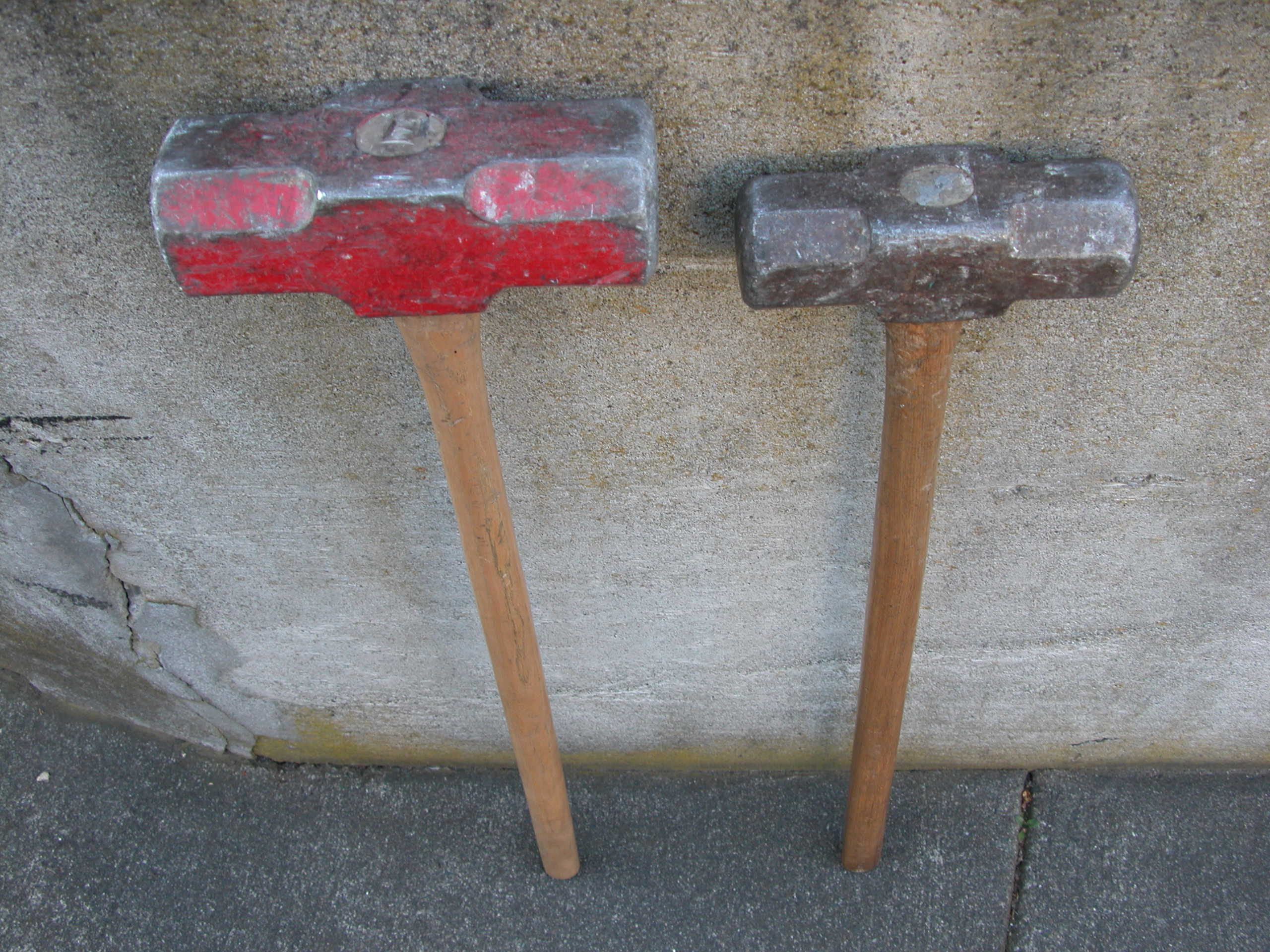
- 20-pound (9.1 kg) and 10-pound (4.5 kg) sledgehammers
- Classification: Hand tool; Improvised weapon
- Used with: Wedge; hammer wrench
- Related: War hammer

A sledgehammer or sledge is a tool with a flat, massive, often metal head, attached to a long wooden or solid handle. Its long handle and heavy head allow the sledgehammer to pick up momentum during a swing and apply a large force compared to hammers designed to drive nails. Along with the mallet, it can distribute force over a wide area. This is in contrast to other types of hammers, which concentrate force in a relatively small area.

== Etymology ==
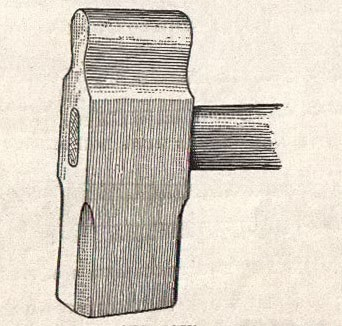
A straight peen sledge hammer from an 1899 American book on blacksmithing

The word sledgehammer is derived from the Old-English "slægan", which, in its first sense, means "to strike violently". The English words "slag", "slay", and "slog" are cognates.

== Uses ==
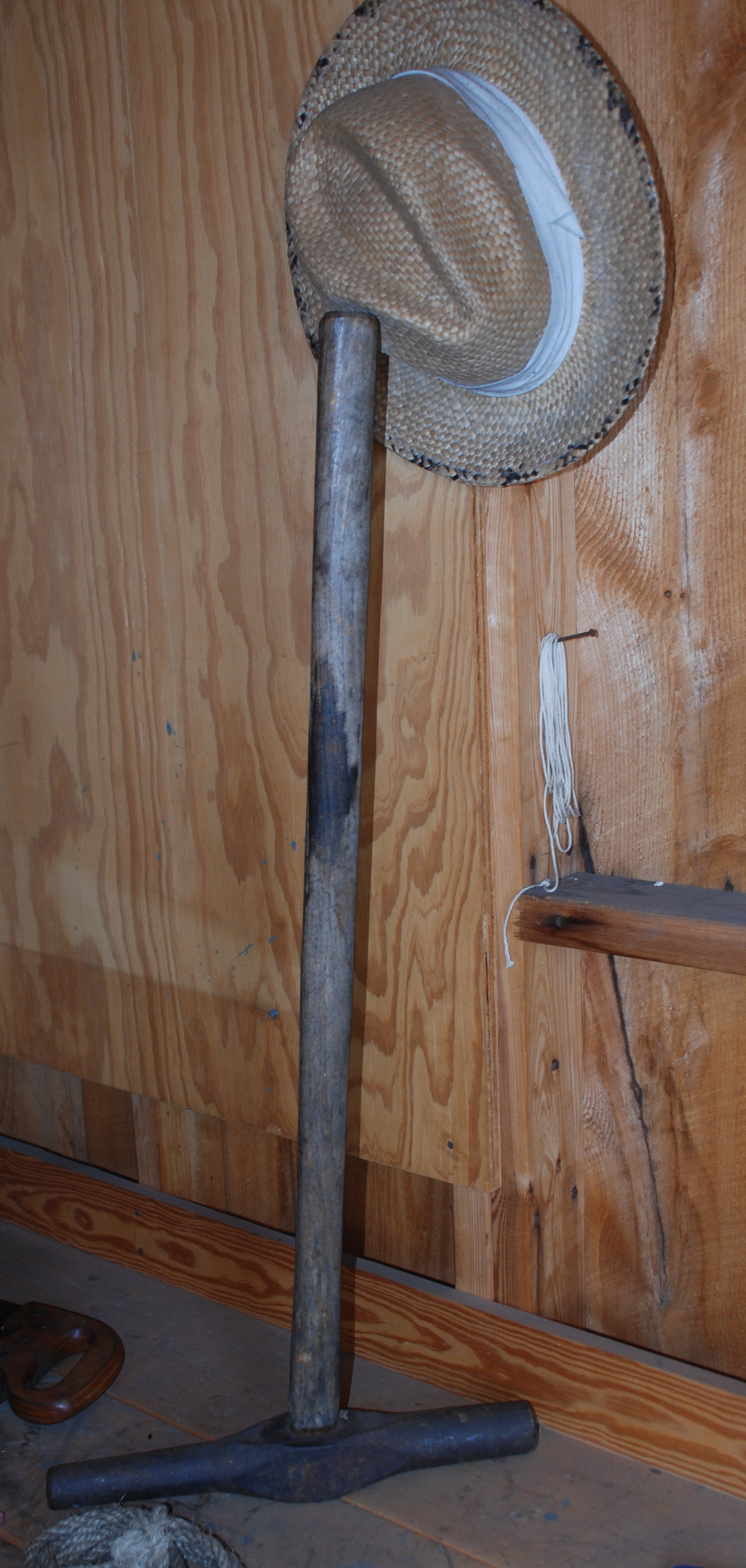
Spike maul used for driving railroad spikes during track construction

The handle can range from 50 centimetres (1 ft 8 in) to a full 1 metre (3 ft 3 in) long, depending on the mass of the head. The head mass is usually 1 to 9 kilograms (2.2 to 19.8 lb). Modern heavy duty sledgehammers come with 10-to-20-pound (4.5–9.1 kg) heads. Sledgehammers usually require two hands and a swinging motion involving the entire torso, in contrast to smaller hammers used for driving in nails. The combination of a long swinging range, and heavy head, increases the force of the resulting impact.

Sledgehammers are often used in demolition work, for breaking through drywall or masonry walls. Sledgehammers were formerly widely used in mining operations, particularly hand steel, but are rarely used in modern mining. Sledgehammers are also used when substantial force is necessary to dislodge a trapped object (often in farm or oil field work), or for fracturing concrete. Another common use is for driving fence posts into the ground. Sledgehammers are used by police forces in raids on property to gain entry by force, commonly through doors. They were and still are commonly used by blacksmiths to shape heavy sections of iron. The British SAS counter terrorist team used sledgehammers to gain access to rooms during the 1980 Iranian Embassy Siege. However, today they use a tool called a "dynamic hammer".

Another use of sledgehammers is for driving railroad spikes into wooden sleepers during rail construction. When the two ends of the Union Pacific railroad were joined at Promontory, Utah, Leland Stanford hammered a golden spike into a sleeper with a silver hammer. Sledges used to drive spikes for rails had curved heads that came down to a "beak" that was only about one inch across. The shape meant that drivers needed to be accurate, and spot where the spike hit was often not much larger than a small coin, as anything larger would hit the plate or the sleeper. The curved head kept the handle away from the rail, as the spikes were driven with the rail between the spike and the driver. These are often called spike mauls.

== Drilling hammer ==
A man cutting a paving stone using a drilling hammer to drive a chisel

Drilling hammer

A drilling hammer, club hammer, lump hammer, crack hammer, mini-sledge or thor hammer is a small sledgehammer whose relatively light weight and short handle allow one-handed use. It is useful for light demolition work, driving masonry nails, and for use with a steel chisel when cutting stone or metal. In this last application, its weight drives the chisel more deeply into the material being cut than lighter hammers. Club hammers are common on the British inland waterways for driving mooring pins into the towpath or canal bank.

Scouts BSA has adopted the shorter sledgehammer, commonly referred to as an engineer's hammer, as an unofficial tool referred to as the scout hammer, as a complement to the pocket knife and hand axe. The handle is 12–18 inches (30–46 cm) long with a head weighing 2 to 6 lb (0.91–2.72 kg). The hammer is used for a variety of purposes such as driving tent stakes, establishing temporary fencing using wood or metal rebar, splitting wood in conjunction with a wedge, or straightening bent objects.

== Post maul ==
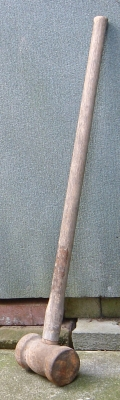
Post maul

Post mauls are similar to sledgehammers in shape but are meant to drive wooden fence posts or tree stakes into the earth. Newer mauls have broad, flat circular faces that are significantly larger in diameter than the body of the head (where the handle attaches). Older post mauls are significantly larger than sledgehammers like their newer counterparts except the outside diameter (body) of older post maul designs remained the same large diameter as that of the faces of the hammer from one side to the other side. Sledgehammers usually have octagonal faces that are the same diameter or slightly smaller than the body of the head, and they are not nearly as large in overall diameter as a post maul.

== In popular culture ==
- The 1986 Peter Gabriel song "Sledgehammer" repeatedly mentions the tool and one is depicted being swung on its cover art.
- In professional wrestling, the sledgehammer is a widely popular weapon, mostly associated with the wrestler Paul "Triple H" Levesque, who made it his weapon of choice.
