= James Tucker (Canadian politician) =

Canadian politician (1857–1918)

Ontario MPP
- In office 1896–1908
- Preceded by: George Tucker
- Succeeded by: James McEwing
- Constituency: Wellington West

Personal details
- Born: March 15, 1857 Peel Township, Canada West
- Died: June 7, 1918 (aged 61) Elgin, Ontario
- Party: Conservative
- Spouse: Mary A. Stewart (m. 1904)
- Occupation: Farmer

James Tucker (March 15, 1857 – June 7, 1918) was an Ontario farmer and political figure in Canada. He represented Wellington West in the Legislative Assembly of Ontario from 1896 to 1908 as a Conservative member.

He was born in Peel Township, Canada West, the son of William Tucker, who came to Upper Canada from England. Tucker raised livestock including Durham cattle and Leicester sheep. He married Mary A. Stewart. He was elected in an 1896 by-election after the election of his brother George in 1894 was declared invalid. Tucker was named registrar for Wellington County in 1911.
