= Andrew Semple =

Canadian politician

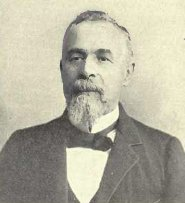

Member of the Canadian Parliament for Wellington Centre
- In office 1887–1900
- Preceded by: George Turner Orton
- Succeeded by: John McGowan

Personal details
- Born: June 10, 1837 Glasgow, Scotland
- Died: January 22, 1916 (aged 78)
- Party: Liberal

Andrew Semple (June 10, 1837 – January 22, 1916) was a Canadian grain merchant, miller, and politician.

Born in Glasgow, Scotland, he emigrated to Canada with his family in 1841 settling in Canada West. Semple was educated at the Common Schools in the County of Simcoe. A farmer and miller, he held the offices of Councillor and Reeve of East Garafraxa for two years. He was first elected to the House of Commons of Canada for the electoral district of Wellington Centre in the 1887 federal election. A Liberal, he was re-elected in 1891 and 1896. He was defeated in 1900.
