= George Tucker (Canadian politician) =

Member of the Ontario Provincial Parliament for Wellington West
- In office June 26, 1894 – January 3, 1896
- Preceded by: Absalom Shade Allan
- Succeeded by: James Tucker

Personal details
- Party: Conservative-Protestant Protective Association
- Relatives: James Tucker (brother)

George Tucker was a Canadian politician from Ontario. He was elected to the Legislative Assembly of Ontario in Wellington West in the 1894 Ontario general election until 1896 when his election was declared void. He was succeeded in office by his brother James.

== See also ==
- 8th Parliament of Ontario
