= John McGowan (politician) =

Canadian politician

Member of Parliament for Wellington Centre
- In office 1900–1904
- Preceded by: Andrew Semple
- Succeeded by: Riding abolished

Ontario MPP
- In office 1871–1879
- Preceded by: Robert McKim
- Succeeded by: Riding abolished
- Constituency: Wellington North

Personal details
- Born: November 5, 1845 Greenock, Scotland
- Died: October 20, 1922 (aged 76)
- Party: Conservative
- Occupation: Farmer

John McGowan (November 5, 1845 – October 20, 1922) was an Ontario businessman, farmer and political figure. He represented Wellington North in the Legislative Assembly of Ontario from 1874 to 1879 and Wellington Centre in the House of Commons of Canada as a Liberal-Conservative member from 1901 to 1904.

He was born in Greenock, Scotland in 1845 and came to Canada West with his parents in 1857. He settled in Peel Township (now part of Mapleton Township) and served as reeve there. He also managed a linseed oil mill in Elora. He was elected to the Ontario legislature in an 1874 by-election and was reelected in 1875. He was elected to the House of Commons in 1900, and served for four years.

== Electoral history ==
Ontario provincial by-election, February 1874: Wellington North Resignation of Robert McKim
Party	Candidate	Votes	%	±%
Conservative	John McGowan	1,627	50.94	+14.47
Independent	Mr. O'Callaghan	1,567	49.06	
Total valid votes		3,194	100.0	+32.53
Conservative gain from Liberal		Swing		+14.47
Source: History of the Electoral Districts, Legislatures and Ministries of the Province of Ontario

1875 Ontario general election: Wellington West
Party	Candidate	Votes	%
Conservative	John McGowan	1,553	51.63
Liberal	Robert McKim	1,455	48.37
Total valid votes		3,008	73.82
Eligible voters		4,075	
Election voided
Source: Elections Ontario

Ontario provincial by-election, October 1875: Wellington West Previous election voided
Party	Candidate	Votes	%
Conservative	John McGowan	1,238	50.57
Liberal	Robert McKim	1,210	49.43
Total valid votes		2,448	
Conservative pickup new district.			
Source: History of the Electoral Districts, Legislatures and Ministries of the Province of Ontario
