= Ross Atkinson McEwing =

Canadian politician

Ross McEwing

Ontario MPP
- In office 1937–1951
- Preceded by: George McQuibban
- Succeeded by: John Henry Haines Root
- Constituency: Wellington North

Personal details
- Born: October 17, 1888 Mapleton, Ontario
- Died: July 1, 1966 (aged 77)
- Party: Liberal
- Spouse: Florence Grose (m. 1913)
- Occupation: Farmer

Ross Atkinson McEwing (October 17, 1888 – 1966) was a farmer and politician in Ontario, Canada. He represented Wellington North in the Legislative Assembly of Ontario from 1937 to 1951 as a Liberal.

The son of James McEwing, who also served in the Ontario assembly, and Louisa S. Atkinson, he was born in Maryborough township. In 1913, he married Florence Grose. McEwing was a vice-president of the Union Telephone Company and served on municipal council from 1932 to 1937.
