= Cobalt, Ontario =

Cobalt
- Town (single-tier)
- Town of Cobalt
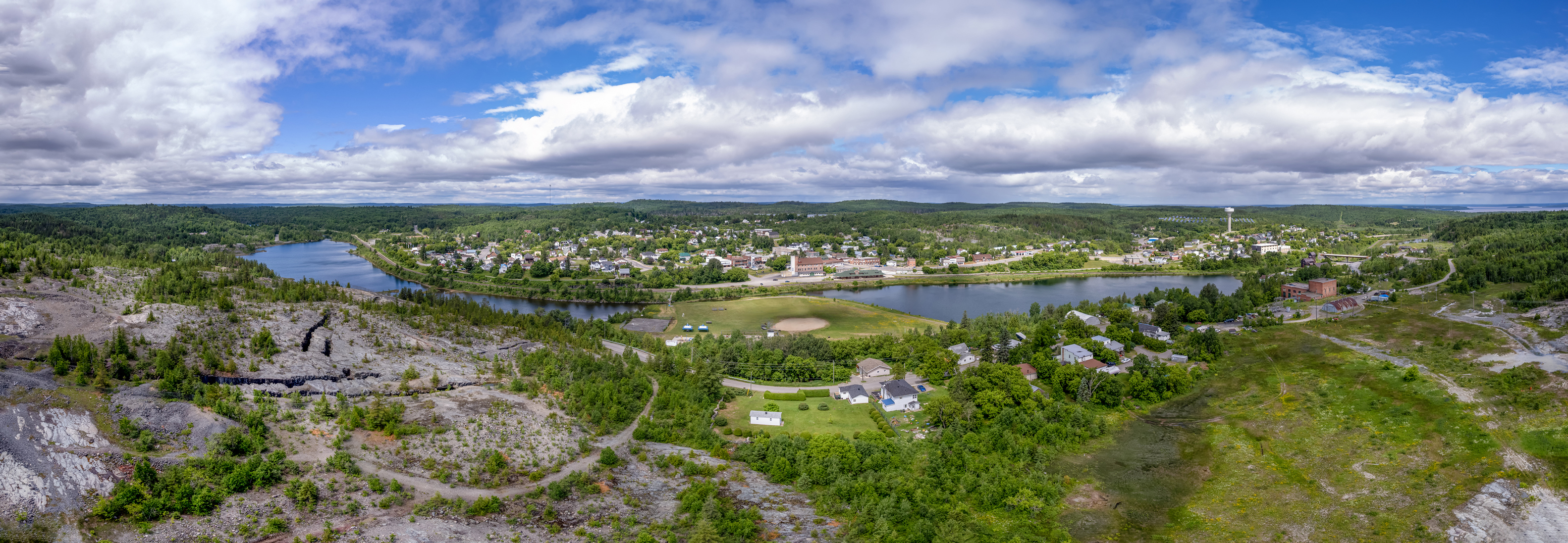
- Cobalt in 2024
- Nickname: Silver City
- Location within Ontario
- Coordinates: 47°24′N 79°41′W
- Country: Canada
- Province: Ontario
- District: Timiskaming
- Established: 1903
- Incorporated: 1906

Government
  - Mayor: Angela Adshead
  - Governing Body: Cobalt Town Council
  - MPs: Pauline Rochefort (L)
  - MPPs: John Vanthof (NDP)

Area
  - Land: 2.07 km^{2} (0.80 sq mi)
- Elevation: 295 m (968 ft)

Population (2021)
  - Total: 989
  - Density: 478.5/km^{2} (1,239/sq mi)
- Time zone: UTC-5 (EST)
  - Summer (DST): UTC-4 (EDT)
- Postal code: P0J 1C0
- Area codes: 705, 249
- Website: www.cobalt.ca

Cobalt is a town in Timiskaming District, Ontario, Canada. It had a population of 989 at the 2021 census.

In the early 1900s, the area was heavily mined for silver; the silver ore also contained cobalt. By 1910, the community was the fourth highest producer of silver in the world. Mining declined significantly by the 1930s, together with the local population. In late 2017 one publication referred to Cobalt as a ghost town, but the high demand for cobalt, used in making batteries for mobile devices and electric vehicles, is leading to great interest in the area among mining companies.

== History ==
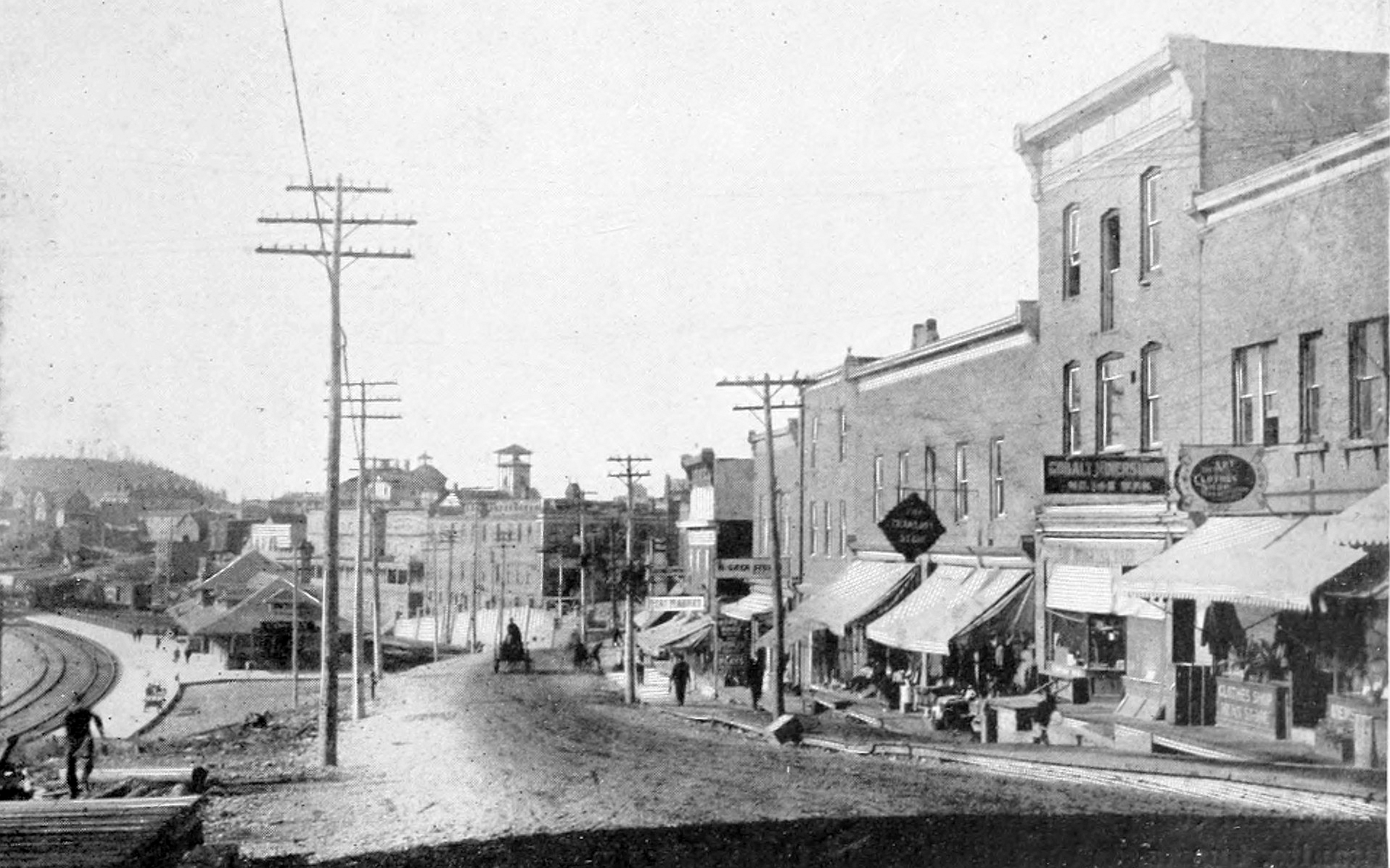
Lang Street in Cobalt, 1911

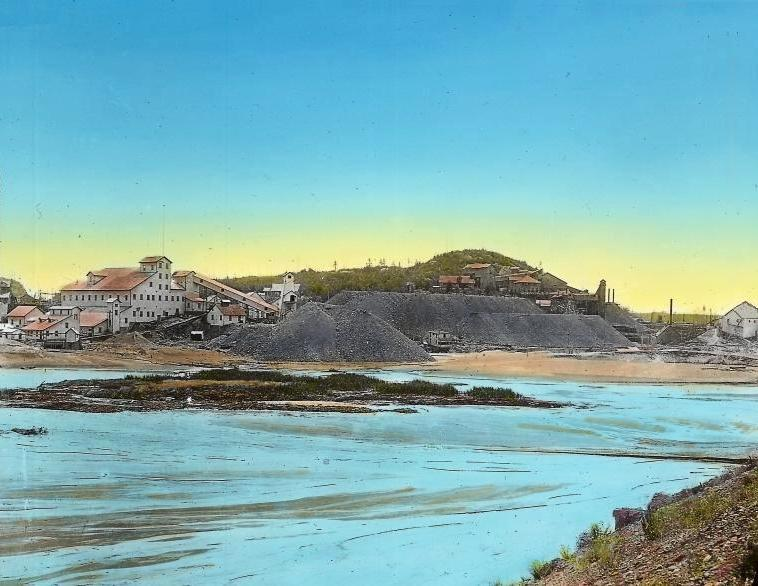
Silver mines in Cobalt, around 1918

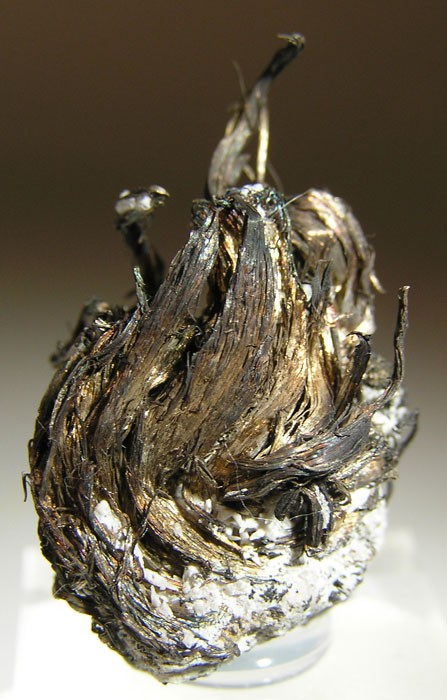
Fine old Cobalt wire-silver specimen. 2.5 x 2.5 x 1.8 cm

W.E. Logan discovered cobalt in 1884 at the future site of the Agaunico Mine, one mile south of Haileybury.

Silver was discovered in the area during the construction of the Temiskaming & Northern Ontario Railway (T&NO) from North Bay to the communities of Haileybury and New Liskeard, north of Cobalt. The discovery was made in 1903, near Long Lake (later called Cobalt Lake), by Ernest Darragh and James McKinley, who were supplying railway ties. Later that year, Tom Hébert found a rich vein on the east side of Cobalt Lake and began a business with hotel owner Arthur Ferland. The silver from both sites was consistently high-grade.

=== Boomtown ===
The subsequent Cobalt silver rush led to the development of the McKinley Darragh, La Rose, Nipissing, and O'Brien silver mines. In 1904, Willet Miller, on a visit to Mile 104 on the T&NO, along with brothers Noah and Henry Timmins, named the future town Cobalt. The Timmins brothers bought the remaining claims from Fred La Rose, and erected some cabins. Speculation over mining stocks on Wall Street in New York City required mounted police to control the crowds. The town was incorporated in 1906.

By 1908, the camp was considered the world's largest producer of silver and of the cobalt which is a byproduct of the process.

In 1911, the 34 mines produced over 30 million ounces (937.5 tons) of silver. The town's population soared to 10,000 by 1909.

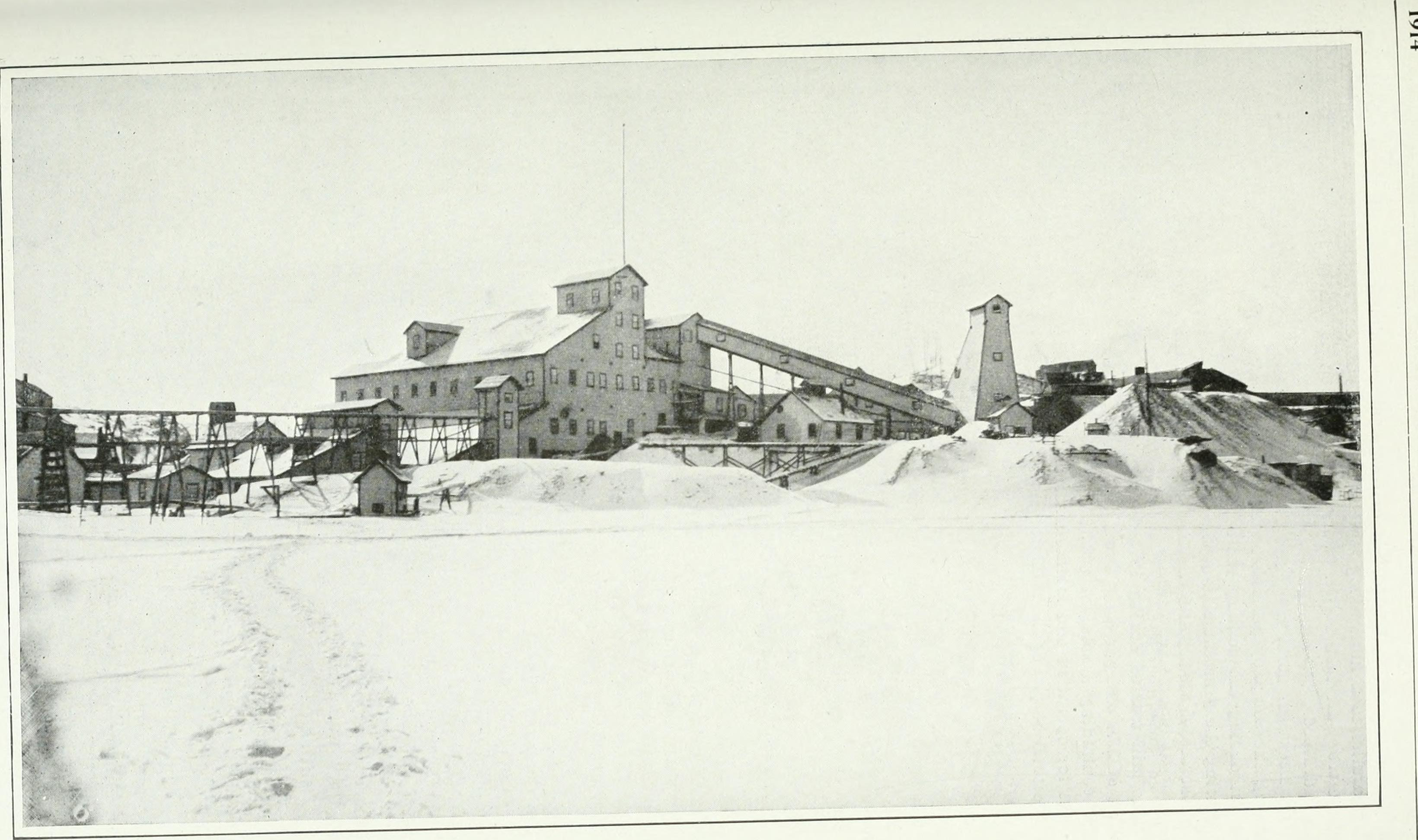
The 40-Stamp Mill of the Cobalt Lake Mine, around 1914

During 1914 the main mines in operation were the City of Cobalt Mining Company, Combat Comet Mine, Cobalt Lake (who owned the bed and edge of the lake), Cobalt Townsite, Colonial Silver Mine, Coniagas Mine, Crown Reserve Mine, the Drummon Fraction Could, Hargrave, Hudson Bay, Kerr Lake, La Rose Consolidated, Lumsden, McKinley-Darragh-Savage, Meteor, Nipissing, O'Brien, Penn-Canadian, Peterson Lake, Provincial, Seneca-Superior, Silver Bar, Temiskaming, Trethewey, and York-Ontario.

Mining continued until the 1930s, then slowed to a trickle. Activity renewed in the 1950s then slowly dropped off, and since the 1980s, there have been no operating mines in the area. By the 1980s, the area had produced between 405 and 420 million ounces of silver. By the 1970s, over 20,000 tonnes(t) of cobalt, 7000 t of nickel and 2000 t of copper were produced throughout the 85 year history of the Cobalt mining camp, with production peaking in 1911. One mill still operated in the area in 2017, and exploration for diamonds and other minerals was ongoing.

The silver mines of Cobalt, and the prospectors and miners who discovered them and worked them, left an indelible mark on Canadian history, and the town is known as the birthplace of hard rock mining in Canada. The ore in Cobalt was close to surface, so men with limited experience could prospect, begin mining, and then hone their skills as the mines went deeper. Those who learned their trade in Cobalt moved north, discovering gold in Kirkland Lake and Timmins and further afield in Canada and around the world. Cobalt mining was done with the use of wheelbarrows, pickaxes, hand steel and dynamite.

=== Fires ===
Cobalt suffered two devastating fires in the 20th century. In 1909, a fire in a cafe spread quickly through debris and garbage-filled alleyways. Half the town was destroyed; 150 buildings were lost and 3,000 residents left homeless; by that time the water table had been contaminated and a typhoid outbreak earlier in the year had killed 111 people. Fire protection at the time was inadequate and firefighters were forced to dynamite buildings to create a firebreak. On a hot and windy Victoria Day in 1977, a discarded cigarette started a fire that destroyed 140 buildings and left over 400 homeless.

=== Hockey ===
The Cobalt Silver Kings played in the inaugural 1910 NHA season.

=== Administration ===
Cobalt, Haileybury, and New Liskeard were formerly known as the Tri-Towns. When Haileybury and New Liskeard were amalgamated into the city of Temiskaming Shores in 2004, Cobalt decided to remain a separate town. However, the two municipalities continue to have a close relationship, including the operation of a shared public transit system.

In 2001 Cobalt was named "Ontario's Most Historic Town" by a in panel of judges on the TV Ontario program Studio 2, and in 2002 the "Cobalt Mining District" was designated a National Historic Site of Canada.

=== Renewed interest in cobalt and silver mining ===
Cobalt is a byproduct of silver mining and was not of significant interest as a mineral until recently; in fact, many considered it to be a "nuisance". Today, however, it is a critical component in the types of rechargeable lithium battery used in millions of mobile devices and in electric cars, and demand is expected to increase. This application for the mineral was not yet possible in the mid-1980s when the last mining company, Agnico Eagle Mines Limited, ceased operations in the area. Cobalt is always mixed not only with silver but also with copper, nickel and other metals.

By 2017, several cobalt exploration companies were focusing on the area around Cobalt, as one alternative to cobalt mining in the politically-unstable Democratic Republic of Congo. Roughly 60% of the world's cobalt is mined in the Congo, much of it using child labour in very poor working conditions. Major companies that require this mineral for their batteries were searching for ethically-sourced product. The shortage of such cobalt is a primary reason for the 300% increase in the price of this commodity since 2015.

Stock prices of First Cobalt Corp. and Cobalt 27 Capital Corp. had soared in 2017 based on this prospect. The CEO of First Cobalt made this comment after returning from a trip to the U.S., Europe, Australia and Asia: "We've got some of the biggest resource companies in the world interested". In October, the company was planning to prospect the Caswell, Ophir and Silver Banner areas, as well as mines around Kerr Lake and Maiden Lake, via the staff of Bjorkman Prospecting of Whiskey Jack, Ontario. At the time, First Cobalt was negotiating a merger with two other companies, Cobalt One and CobalTech. If the merger is completed, the group expected to control about 45% of the potential mining properties in the Cobalt area including 50 mines that previously produced cobalt and silver; a competitor, Agnico Eagle, controls approximately 21%. However the latter ceased production there in the 1980s.

Silver was selling for US$17 per ounce in late November 2017, down significantly from its peak of US$50 in 2012, but cobalt was at about US$31 per pound at that time, up significantly from the US$10 price in late 2015. The prices will increase according to Gino Chitaroni, the president of the Northern Prospectors' Association. He also predicted that the area around Cobalt would be a primary source of both minerals. "It's spectacular ... We have the infrastructure. We have a historic mining area. It puts us a step up on anywhere [else] in the world."

In March 2017, the town's mayor estimated that mining production could start in about three to five years.

== Demographics ==
In the 2021 Census of Population conducted by Statistics Canada, Cobalt had a population of 989 living in 454 of its 542 total private dwellings, a change of −12.3% from its 2016 population of 1,128. With a land area of 2.07 km^{2} (0.80 sq mi), it had a population density of 477.8/km^{2} (1,237.4/sq mi) in 2021.

Canada census – Cobalt community profile

| | 2021 | 2016 | 2011 |
| Population | 989 (-12.3% from 2016) | 1,118 (-0.4% from 2011) | 1,133 (-7.4% from 2006) |
| Land area | 2.07 km^{2} (0.80 sq mi) | 1.44 km^{2} (0.56 sq mi) | 2.05 km^{2} (0.79 sq mi) |
| Population density | 478.5/km^{2} (1,239/sq mi) | 776.0/km^{2} (2,010/sq mi) | 553.0/km^{2} (1,432/sq mi) |
| Median age | 48.0 (M: 47.6, F: 48.0) | 47.5 (M: 47.2, F: 47.7) | 46.5 (M: 46.1, F: 47.0) |
| Private dwellings | 542 (total) 454 (occupied) | 611 (total) | 559 (total) |
| Median household income | $56,000 | $42,816 |

References: 2021 2016 2011

Historical census populations – Cobalt, Ontario

| Year | Pop. | ±% |
|---|---|---|
| 1911 | 5,638 | — |
| 1921 | 4,449 | −21.1% |
| 1931 | 3,885 | −12.7% |
| 1941 | 2,376 | −38.8% |
| 1951 | 2,230 | −6.1% |
| 1956 | 2,367 | +6.1% |
| 1961 | 2,209 | −6.7% |

| Year | Pop. | ±% |
|---|---|---|
| 1966 | 2,211 | +0.1% |
| 1971 | 2,197 | −0.6% |
| 1976 | 2,056 | −6.4% |
| 1981 | 1,759 | −14.4% |
| 1986 | 1,640 | −6.8% |
| 1991 | 1,470 | −10.4% |
| 1996 | 1,401 | −4.7% |

| Year | Pop. | ±% |
|---|---|---|
| 2001 | 1,229 | −12.3% |
| 2006 | 1,224 | −0.4% |
| 2011 | 1,122 | −8.3% |
| 2016 | 1,118 | −0.4% |
| 2021 | 989 | −11.5% |

Source: Statistics Canada

== Environmental issues ==
The mining activities in Cobalt have left a significant environmental legacy. Millions of tons of mine waste rock and mill tailings were dumped on the land and in local lakes. In cobalt ores, silver was associated with arsenic minerals. Some of it ended up in the tailings and waste rock. Today this arsenic contaminates surface water in the area and is believed to pose risks to the environment. Sediment samples from surrounding lakes showed elevated concentration levels of nickel, copper and arsenic while water samples exceeded the provincial water quality guideline for cobalt and arsenic. Fish from five of the lakes around Cobalt had mercury concentration which exceeded the consumption limit as well as elevated concentration for arsenic.

The Cobalt area is also laced with many miles of underground mine workings, surface trenches, pits and shaft openings. As a result, there are risks of collapse, or subsidence of underground mine workings, and many areas have been fenced off to prevent entry.

== Tourism and attractions ==
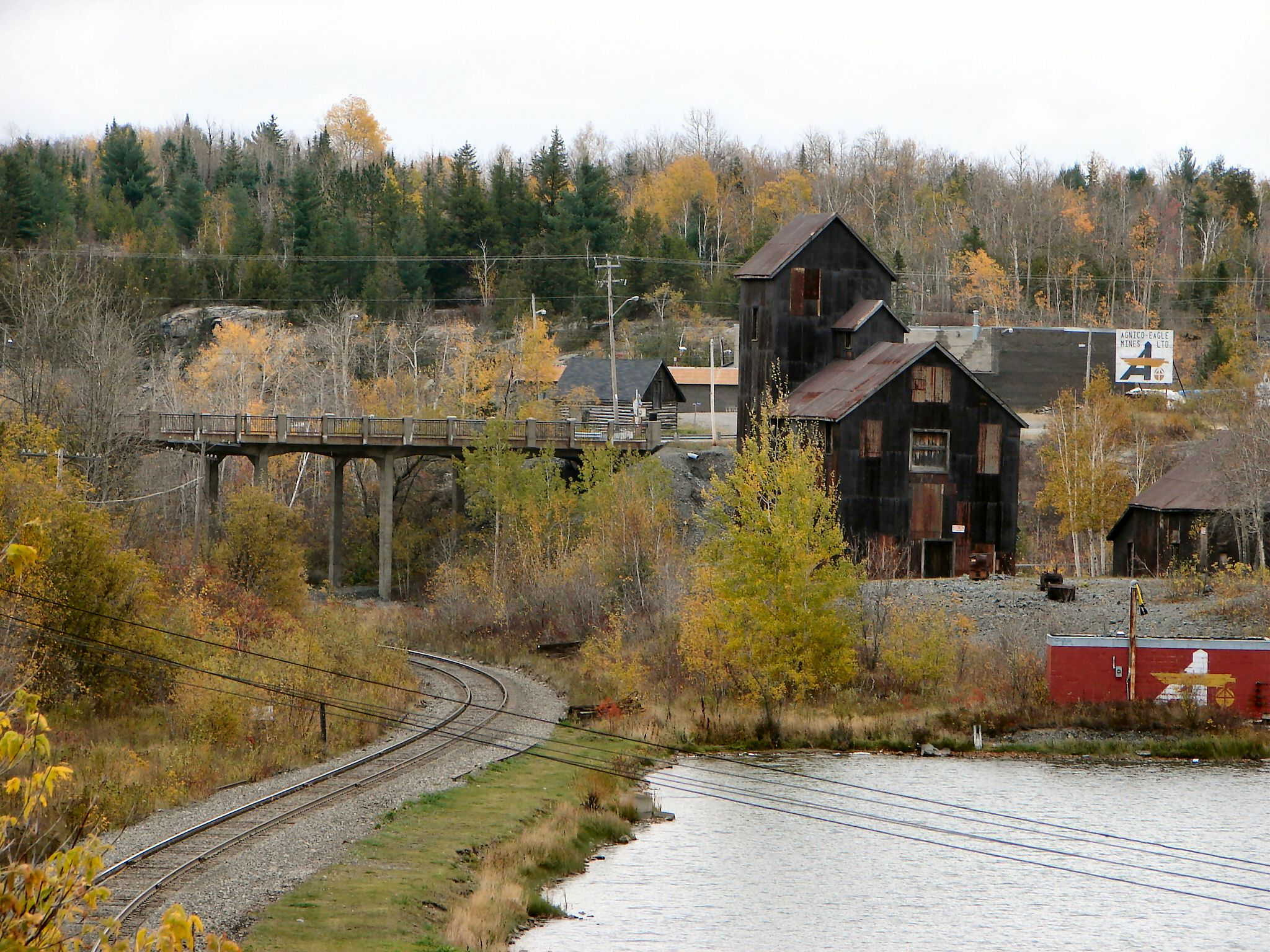
Historic mine in Cobalt, 2007.

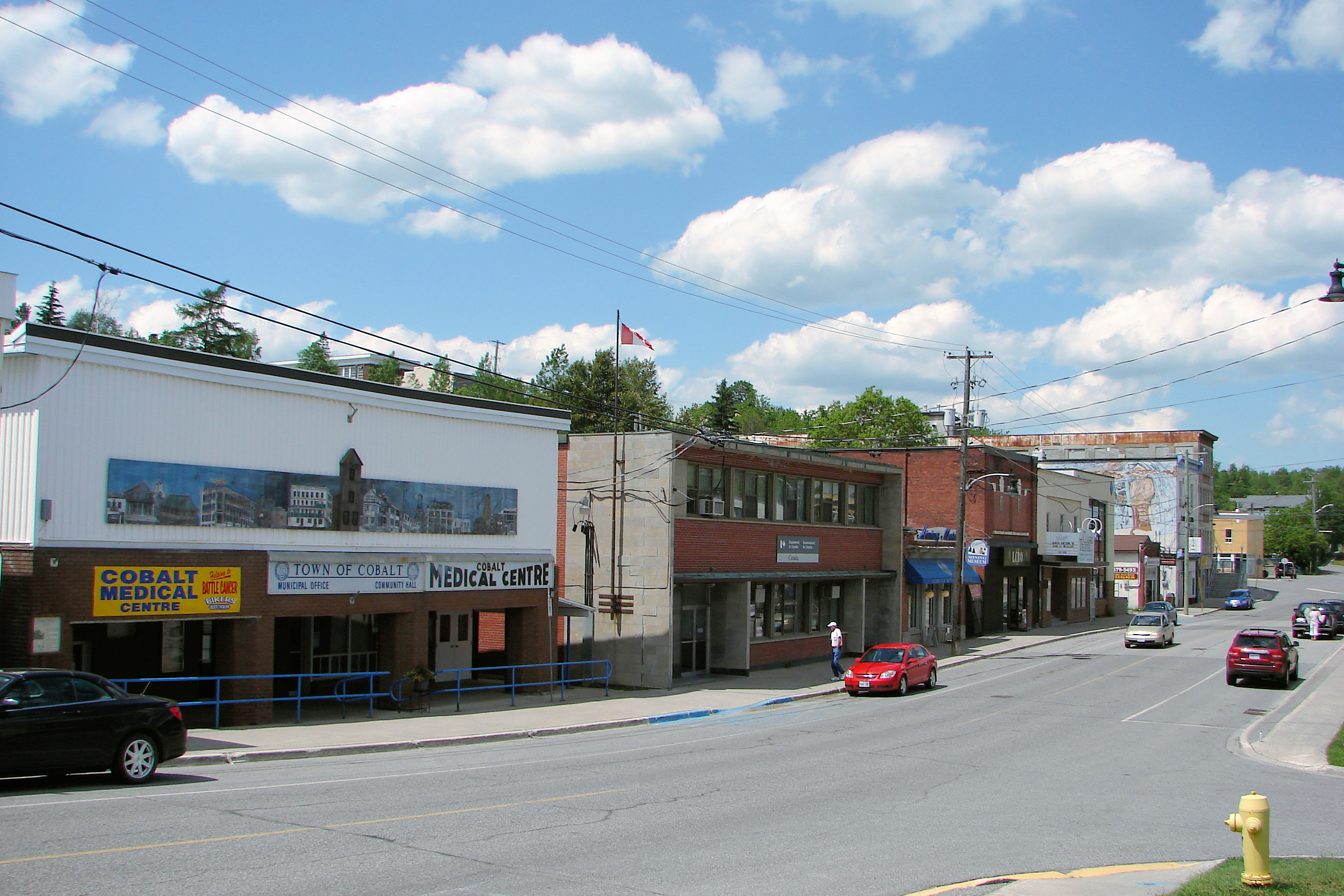
Main street Cobalt

Visitors to Cobalt can visit the Cobalt Mining Museum, which boasts the world's largest display of locally mined silver, as well as "The Bunker" military museum and the Northern Ontario Firefighters Museum. The Heritage Silver Trail is a self-guided driving tour of several mine and mill sites in the area. The trail is well marked, guiding visitors around the backroads of Cobalt. At each site, signs are posted, identifying the site, and providing a brief description of the site. The trail guides visitors to many of the remaining mine headframes in the Cobalt area, some of which are quite picturesque, and stand as an important reminder of Cobalt's past.

Visitors can also take a tour of an old underground mine. Tours start at the Mining Museum, and are guided by museum staff. The narrow damp tunnels of the mine give a real appreciation for the conditions under which miners worked, and tour guides sprinkle the tour with many stories to help bring the past to life.

On February 14, 2008, plans were announced to convert the vacant Fraser Hotel building into a complex which will include The Bunker museum, housing units, tourist accommodations, and a proposed culinary school.

Passenger rail service continued to be provided from the Cobalt railway station on the Ontario Northland Railway's Northlander train (it was during the building of this line that silver had been discovered in Cobalt) until it was discontinued on September 28, 2012.

A notable tourist attraction in the area in the 20th century was the Highway Book Shop, which closed in 2011.

== Notable people ==
- Charlie Angus, former federal Member of Parliament for Timmins—James Bay
- Mike Bolan, former provincial MPP
- Kent Douglas, hockey player, winner of the Calder Memorial Trophy in 1963.
- Edward Holland, awarded the Victoria Cross for service in the Boer War died in Cobalt in 1948.
- Walter Frederick Light, President of Northern Telecom 1974-1979, CEO and chairman of Northern Telecom 1979-1984.
- Bruce Lonsdale, former mayor of Cobalt and federal Member of Parliament for Timiskaming
- Elmer Sopha, former provincial MPP

== See also ==
- List of francophone communities in Ontario
- Cobalt: Cradle of the Demon Metals, Birth of a Mining Superpower (2022 book by Charlie Angus)
