= John Henry Haines Root =

Ontario farmer and political figure

John Root

Ontario MPP
- In office 1955–1975
- Preceded by: New riding
- Succeeded by: Jack Johnson
- Constituency: Wellington—Dufferin
- In office 1951–1955
- Preceded by: Ross McEwing
- Succeeded by: Riding abolished
- Constituency: Wellington North

Personal details
- Born: October 17, 1908 Erin, Ontario
- Died: November 17, 1991 (aged 83)
- Party: Progressive Conservative
- Spouse: Lillie Matilda Toop (m. 1932)
- Occupation: Farmer

John Henry Haines Root (October 17, 1908 – November 17, 1991) was an Ontario farmer and political figure. He represented Wellington North and then Wellington—Dufferin in the Legislative Assembly of Ontario from 1951 to 1975 as a Progressive Conservative member.

He was born in Erin Township, Ontario, the son of David Oscar Root. With his brother Haines, Root ran the family farm and also operated a trucking business to transport livestock and farm supplies. In 1932, he married Lillie Matilda Toop. He served on the local school board and was a Mason. Root served in the provincial cabinet as Minister Without Portfolio from 1958 to 1961. He retired from politics in 1975. He was named to the Ontario Water Resources Commission in 1961 and later served as its chairman.
