= Michael John O'Brien =

Canadian industrialist and senator

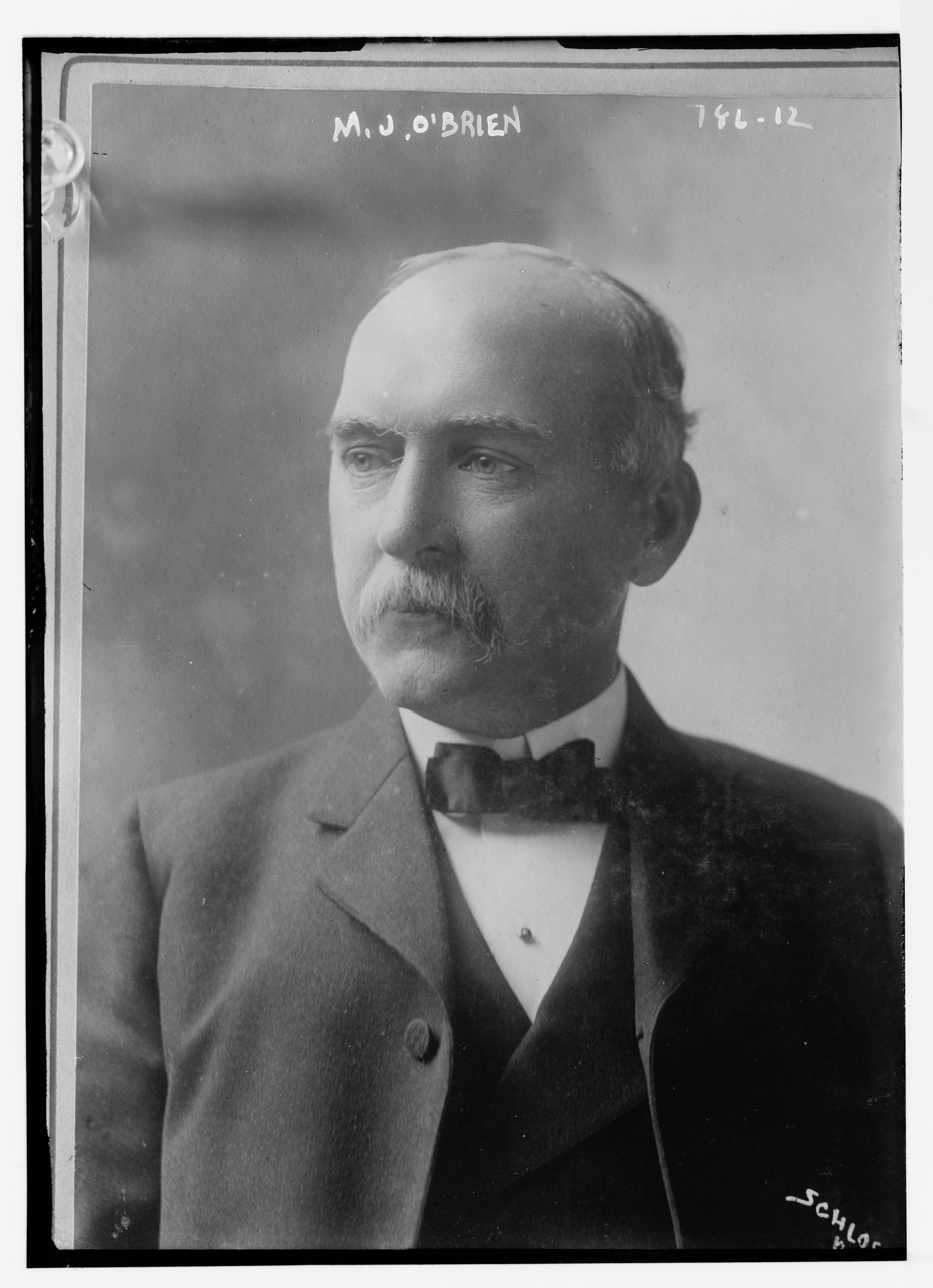
M.J. O'Brien, 1912. Portrait by George Grantham Bain.

The Hon. Michael John O'Brien (19 September 1851 – 26 October 1940) was a railway builder, industrialist and philanthropist. He was named to the Senate of Canada in 1918. He was a founder of the town of Renfrew, Ontario. He was instrumental in the early history of professional ice hockey in Eastern Canada.

== Early life ==
O'Brien was born in Lochaber, Nova Scotia to Irish immigrant John O'Brien (1799 - 1869) and his wife, Mary Elizabeth Cleary O'Brien (1832 - 1900), daughter of Michael Cleary and Elizabeth Foley. He attended school until Grade 8, quitting at age 14 for a water boy position at a railway construction site.

== Career ==
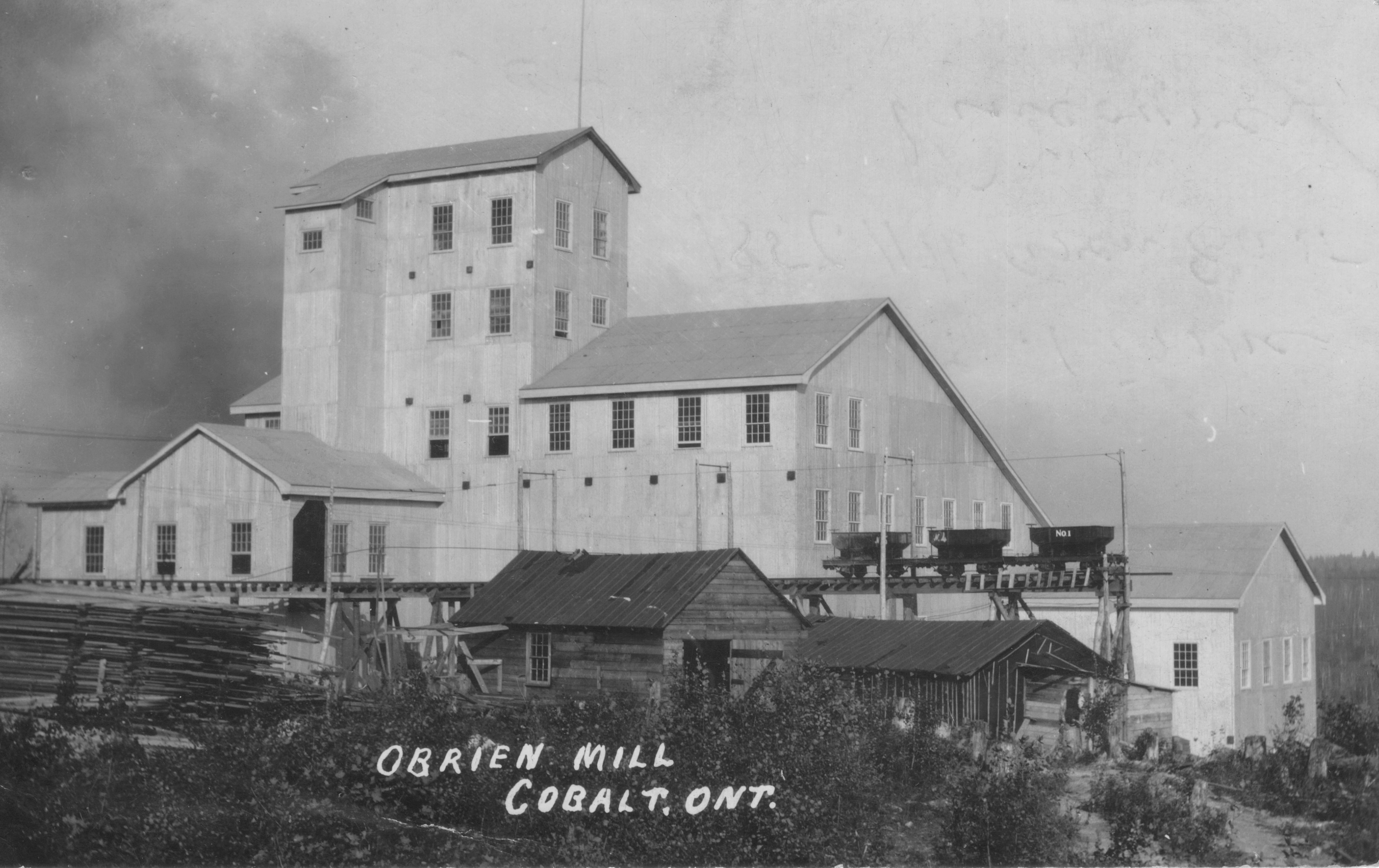
O'Brien Mine in Cobalt, Ontario

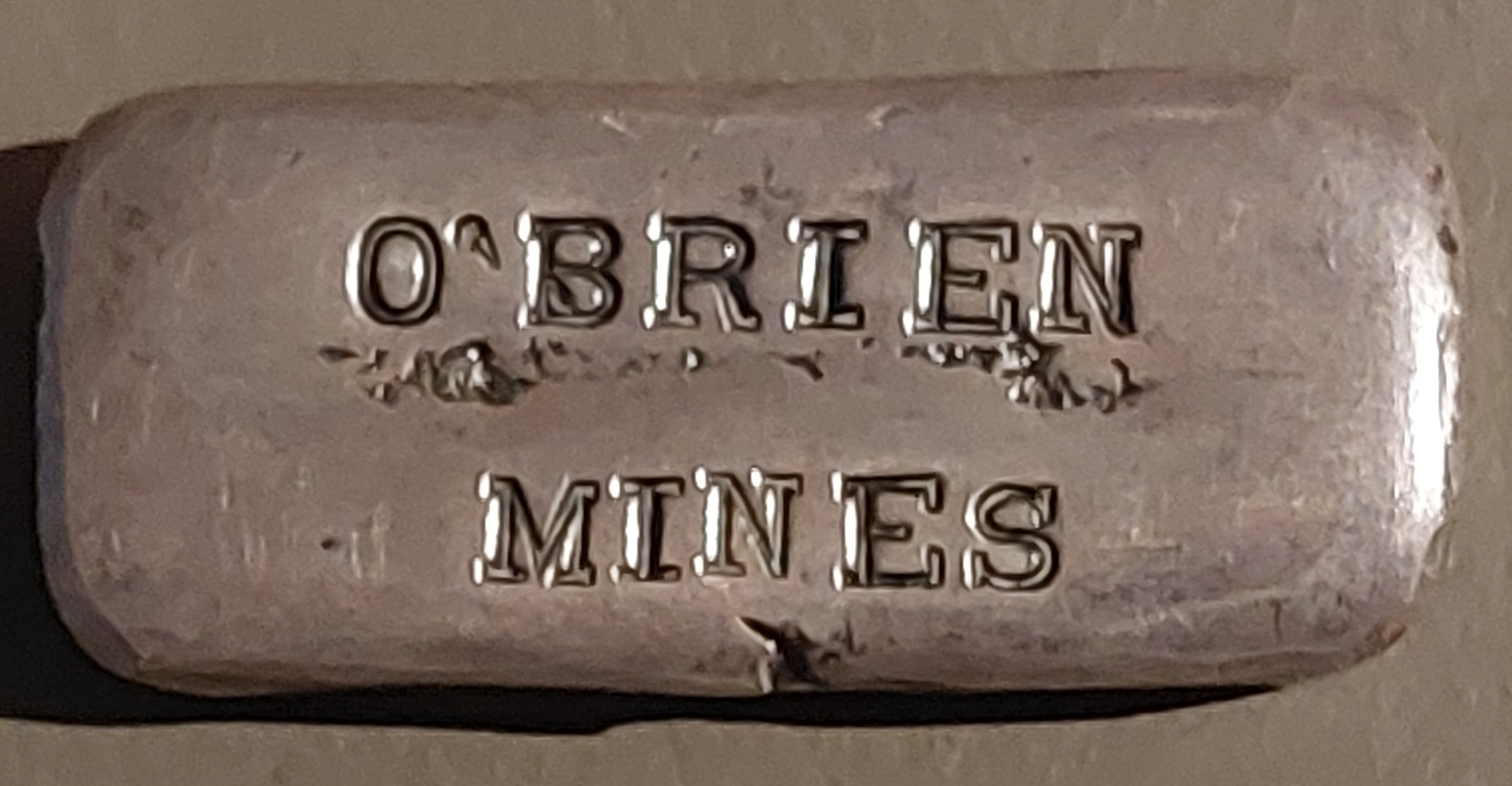
Silver ingot from O'Brien mine

Having started as a water boy, O'Brien was subcontracting for railroad work by the age of 18, then followed the new railways across the country during the early heyday of rapid railway expansion in Canada. He arrived in Renfrew, Ontario as a teenager and, in 1879, he and two partners won the contract to build the Kingston and Pembroke Railway (K & P). While walking the future rail path between Sharbot Lake to the town of Renfrew, he happened to meet the Barry family, including his future first wife, Jane "Jenny" Barry, where her father, James, had built their home on the south shore of Calabogie Lake. In 1891, he went bankrupt, after a disastrous contract for the Canada Atlantic Railway, then rebuilt his wealth through construction contracts.

O'Brien served as Commissioner of the Temiskaming and Northern Ontario Railway, from 1902 to 1905. While commissioner in 1903, O'Brien bought four claims that would become the O'Brien silver mine in Cobalt, Ontario from prospector Neil King for CA$4,000 (equivalent to $143,825 in 2023), then "promptly sued the owners of the adjacent LaRose claim for a piece of conflicting property." The La Rose claim had been bought from Fred La Rose by the Timmins and McMartin brothers; a protracted legal battle ensued between the "O'Brien crowd" and the "LaRose people", collectively, "The Big Cobalters", which "caught the Whitney government in the cross-fire," before a publicly profitable conclusion was devised by the Government of Ontario in 1906.

During World War I, O'Brien recruited and equipped several battalions of railway workers. He served as Senator for Ontario from 1918 to 1925, serving on the Standing Committee on Public Buildings and Grounds and the Standing Committee on Railways, Telegraphs and Harbours for the Liberal Party of Canada. His influence in Renfrew and the surrounding area included a dairy, woolens and knit factories, and saw and planing lumber mills.

== Role in professional ice hockey ==
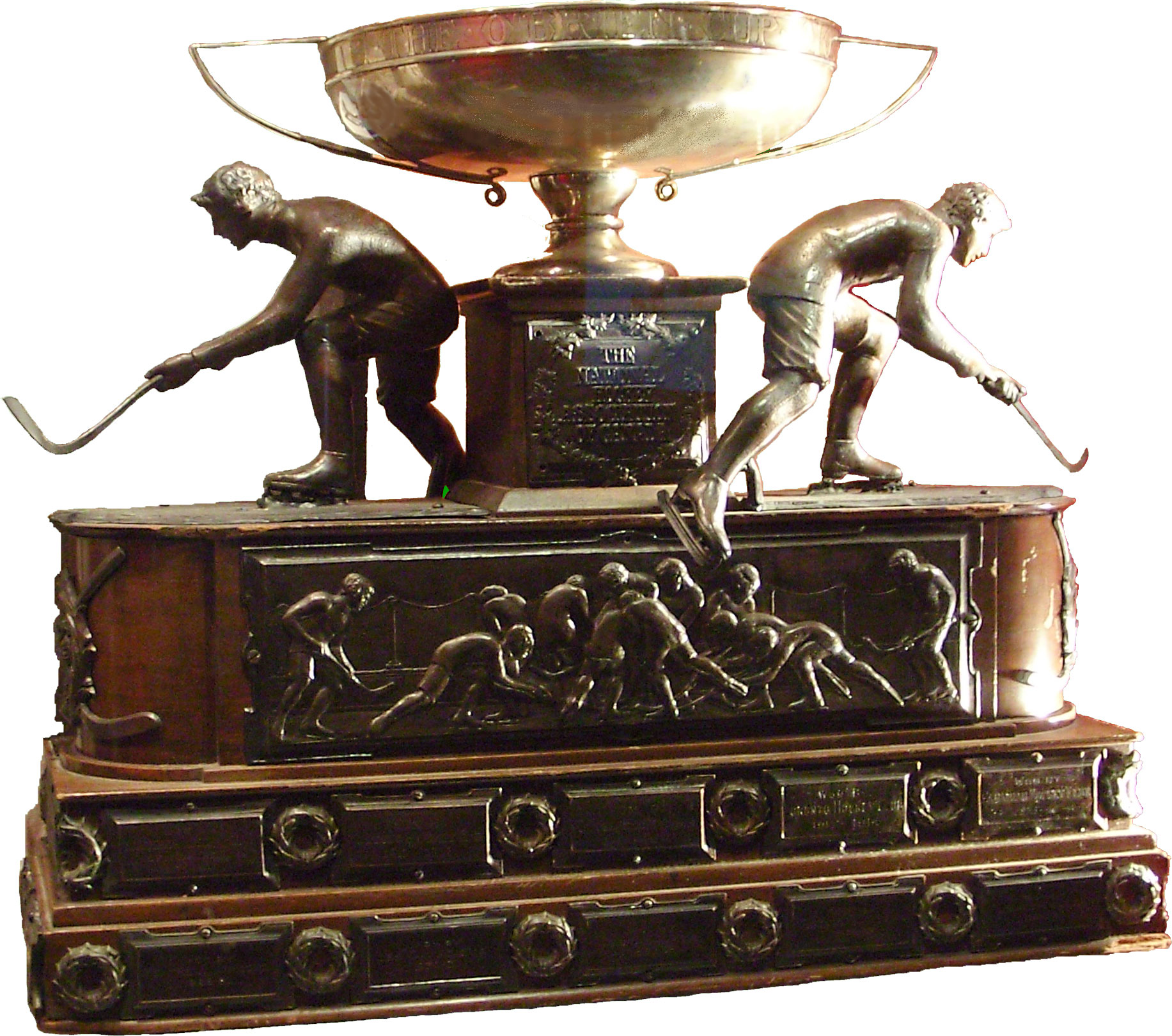
O'Brien Cup

O'Brien's son Ambrose played varsity ice hockey at the University of Toronto; after graduation, Ambrose founded several hockey teams, financed by M.J., including teams in Cobalt, Haileybury, Montreal and Renfrew, which all played in the first season of the National Hockey Association (NHA). The organization was co-founded by Ambrose in 1909 after a dispute in the existing Eastern Canada Hockey Association professional league and the rejection of O'Brien's teams to be admitted to the ECHA. The NHA survived and later absorbed the ECHA teams to provide a single professional ice hockey league in Eastern Canada. It is the forerunner of the National Hockey League (NHL).

One of the teams, the Renfrew Creamery Kings was popularly known as the Renfrew Millionaires because of the rumoured high contract values of the players paid by O'Brien. The Kings players had been lured from other professional teams to play in Renfrew, with the goal of winning the Stanley Cup championship. O'Brien ended his funding of the mining town teams (Cobalt, Haileybury) after the first season and sold off their NHA franchises along with the Montreal franchise. The two mining town franchises were sold to Toronto interests to become the Toronto Blueshirts and Toronto Tecumsehs, beginning play in 1912. After failing twice to win the Stanley Cup, and unwilling to further underwrite the costs of the Renfrew team, O'Brien exited the ice hockey business in 1911, folding the Renfrew team. The Montreal team was sold to Montreal owners and it survives to this day in the NHL. Initially known as "Les Canadiens', it was later renamed the Montreal Canadiens, "possibly the most storied franchise in Canadian sport."

O'Brien donated the O'Brien Cup to the NHA to be awarded to the league champion. The NHA was suspended in 1917 and replaced by the NHL. The NHL continued to use it until 1950. It was given to the NHL champion, and later to the Stanley Cup runner-up. It is in the collection of the Hockey Hall of Fame. It is made of silver from the O'Brien mine.

== Legacy ==
O'Brien was a financial supporter of the preservation of Renfrew's heritage buildings, including its opera house. In 1926, he was made a Knight Commander of the Order of St. Gregory the Great, a decoration bestowed by Pope Pius XI. He died in 1940 in Renfrew.

== See also ==
- National Hockey Association
- Montreal Canadiens
- Renfrew Millionaires
