= Cumnock, Ontario =

- Unincorporated rural community
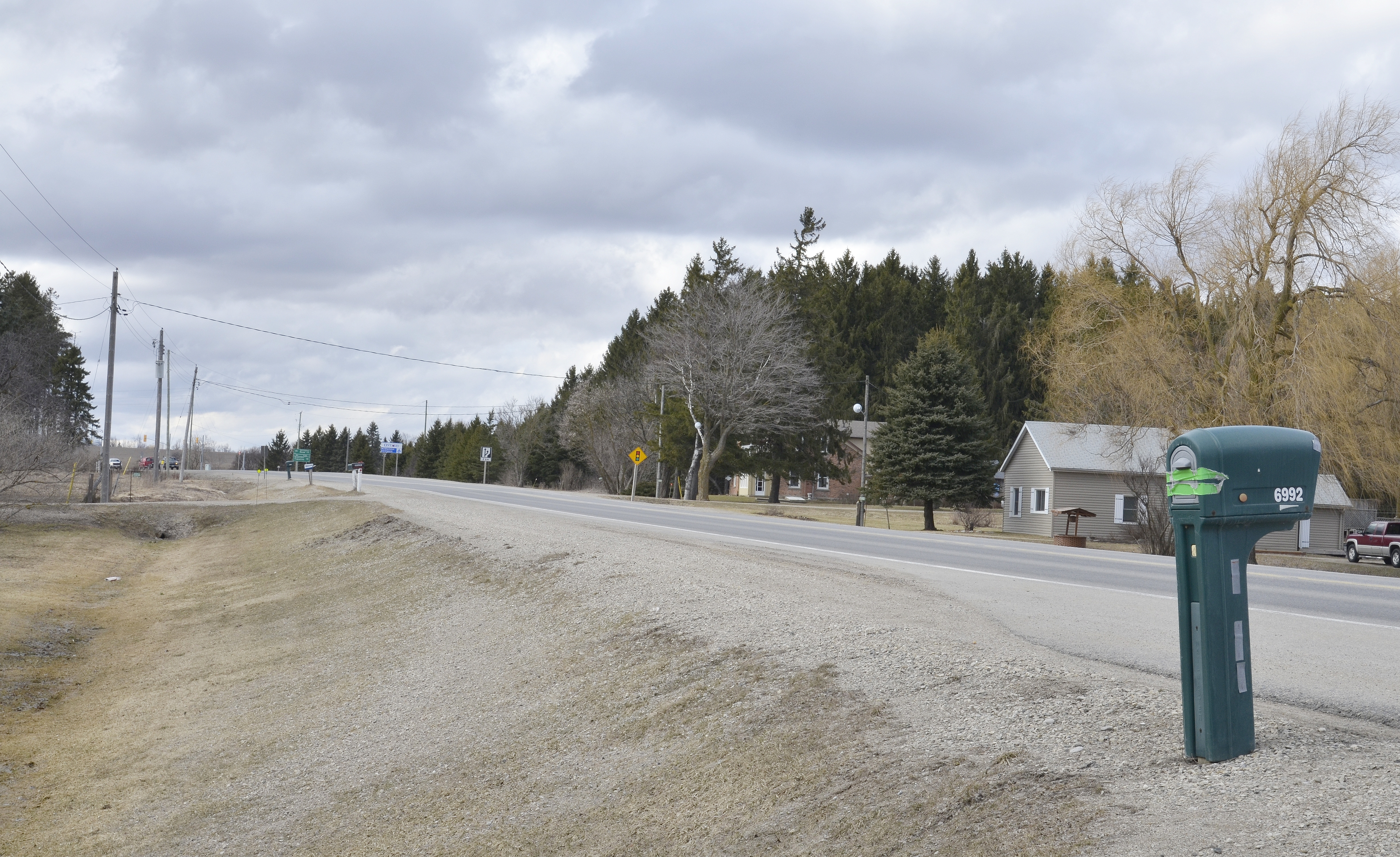
- Highway 6 in Cumnock

- Location within Canada Location within Ontario
- Coordinates: 43°45′35″N 80°27′25″W
- Country: Canada
- Province: Ontario
- County: Wellington
- Township: Centre Wellington
- Time zone: UTC-5 (Eastern (EST))
  - Summer (DST): UTC-4 (EDT)
- GNBC Code: FAUXS

Cumnock is an unincorporated rural community in Centre Wellington Township, Wellington County, Ontario, Canada. Cumnock was part of Nichol Township until 1999.

The settlement is located on Highway 6, 9 km (5.6 mi) northwest of Fergus.

Once a thriving rural community, little remains of the original settlement.

== History ==
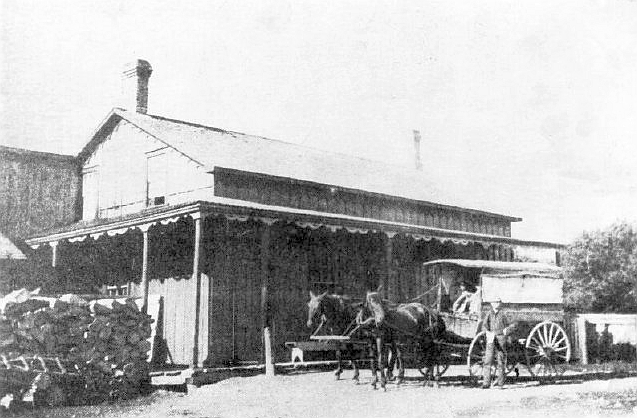
The Fergus stage coach, which carried both mail and passengers, stopped in front of the general store and post office in Cumnock (circa 1890)

James Samson, a Scottish immigrant, purchased 7,367 acres (2,981 ha) of land in the area in 1852. Samson built a general store and tavern along the Owen Sound Road (now Highway 6), and named the settlement after his hometown of Cumnock, Scotland. A post office was established in Samson's store in 1855, with Samson as postmaster.

In 1855, Richard Gluyas laid out Gluyasville a short distance north of Cumnock. Gluyasville was eventually absorbed by Cumnock.

The Wellington, Grey and Bruce Railway built a line through Cumnock in 1871, and a station was built there. That same year, Cumnock was noted as having a saw mill, a wagon maker, and two hotels (the British Hotel and the Red Lion). The Red Lion Hotel was owned by Scottish immigrant John Muir, who "went back to Scotland several times to bring back wives to Cumnock".

The Cumnock Methodist Church was built in 1877.

Cumnock was noted as having a cheese factory in 1880.

=== Decline ===
At its peak, Cumnock had a population of 200, though by 1908, the settlement had one hotel, two stores, two churches, and a population of 86.

The post office closed in 1915, and the Methodist church closed in 1924.

An author writing in 1933 described the northern boundary of Nichol Township "where Cumnock used to be", and by 1969, Cumnock was no longer listed on provincial maps.

The railroad line through Cumnock was eventually taken over by Canadian National Railway, and was abandoned in 1983.

== Cumnock Tract ==
In 1964, the County of Wellington purchased two parcels of forested land at Cumnock for recreational use. Located within the westernmost parcel is the Cumnock Tract, a 1.5 km (0.93 mi) walking trail.

== Notable people ==
- James Ross, farmer and member of the House of Commons of Canada.
