= George Turner Orton =

Canadian politician

Dr. George Turner Orton
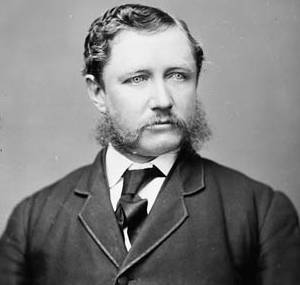
- George Turner Orton; Source:Library and Archives Canada

Member of the Canadian Parliament for Wellington Centre
- In office 1874–1887
- Preceded by: James Ross
- Succeeded by: Andrew Semple

Personal details
- Born: January 19, 1837 Guelph, Upper Canada
- Died: November 14, 1901 (aged 64) Winnipeg, Manitoba, Canada
- Party: Liberal-Conservative
- Education: University of St Andrews
- Profession: Physician, Politician

George Turner Orton (January 19, 1837 – November 14, 1901) was a physician and political figure in Ontario, Canada. He represented Wellington Centre in the House of Commons of Canada from 1874 to 1887 as a Liberal-Conservative.

He was born in Guelph, Upper Canada, the son of Dr. Henry Orton, who came to Upper Canada from England, and Mary Jerram. He studied medicine at the College of Surgeons in Dublin and the University of St Andrews in Scotland. He graduated from the University of St Andrews School of Medicine with an M.D. in 1860. After practising in England, Orton returned to Ancaster, Ontario where he set up practice with his brother T.J. Orton, later moving to Fergus. He served as surgeon for the county militia.

Orton ran unsuccessfully for a federal seat in 1872, but was elected in the general election of 1874. His election was overturned on petition for a controverted election, but he was re-elected in a by-election in 1875. An issue then arose concerning the oath of allegiance to the monarch, which the British North America Act, 1867 required all members of Parliament to swear before taking their seat. Orton had sworn the oath after his original election, but did not re-swear it after the by-election, apparently on the misunderstanding that he did not need to swear it again. When the matter was drawn to his attention, he promptly swore the oath of allegiance. A committee of the House of Commons investigated the matter and recommended that all of his votes in the Commons prior to re-swearing the oath should be struck from the record.

In 1883, he moved to Winnipeg. Orton was surgeon for a brigade which served during the North-West Rebellion. He also served as medical officer for the Canadian Pacific Railway and coroner for British Columbia. Orton married Ann Farmer. He was defeated in a bid for reelection in 1887. Orton also served as reeve for Fergus. In 1888, he was named medical officer for the federal Department of Indian Affairs. He died in Winnipeg at the age of 64.

The community of Orton, Ontario was named in his honour.
