= Hand steel =

Traditional mining technique

Hand steel is mining with the use of a chisel-like tool. The chisel is struck violently with a striking tool, usually with a sledgehammer. It is one of the several mining techniques used in traditional mining and one of the several with the use of basic hand tools. Hand steel was used in the 19th and 20th centuries for surface and underground mining.
