= Wellington Centre =

Former federal electoral district in Ontario, Canada

Wellington Centre was a federal electoral district represented in the House of Commons of Canada from 1867 to 1904. It was located in the province of Ontario.

It was created by the British North America Act 1867, which divided the County of Wellington, divided into North, South and Centre Ridings. The Centre Riding consisted of the Townships of Anson, Garrafraxa, Erin, Eramosa, Nichol, and Pilkington, and the Villages of Fergus and Elora.

In 1872, it was defined to consist of the Townships of Pilkington, Elora, Nichol, Fergus, Garrafraxa West, Garrafraxa East, Peel and the Village of Orangeville. In 1882, the township Maryboro' was added to the riding.

The electoral district was abolished in 1903 when it was redistributed between Dufferin, Wellington North and Wellington South ridings.

== Electoral history ==
1867 Canadian federal election: Wellington Centre
Party	Candidate	Votes	%	±%
Liberal	PARKER, Thomas Sutherland	acclaimed		

By-election: On Mr. Parker's death, 18 January 1869: Wellington Centre
Party	Candidate	Votes	%	±%
Liberal	ROSS, James	acclaimed		

1872 Canadian federal election: Wellington Centre
Party	Candidate	Votes	%	±%
Liberal	ROSS, James	1,434		
Liberal-Conservative	ORTON, George Turner	1,388		

1874 Canadian federal election: Wellington Centre
Party	Candidate	Votes	%	±%
Liberal-Conservative	ORTON, George Turner	1,530		
Unknown	MCKINE, R.	1,481		

By-election: On Mr. Orton being unseated on petition, 3 November 1874: Wellington Centre
Party	Candidate	Votes	%	±%
Liberal-Conservative	ORTON, George Turner	1,571		
Liberal	ROSS, James	1,445		

1878 Canadian federal election: Wellington Centre
Party	Candidate	Votes	%	±%
Liberal-Conservative	ORTON, George Turner	1,683		
Unknown	ROBINSON, J.	1,677		

1882 Canadian federal election: Wellington Centre
Party	Candidate	Votes	%	±%
Liberal-Conservative	ORTON, George Turner	2,208		
Liberal	CARTWRIGHT, Sir R.J.	2,056		

1887 Canadian federal election: Wellington Centre
Party	Candidate	Votes	%	±%
Liberal	SEMPLE, Andrew	2,427		
Liberal-Conservative	ORTON, George Turner	2,377		

1891 Canadian federal election: Wellington Centre
Party	Candidate	Votes	%	±%
Liberal	SEMPLE, Andrew	2,455		
Conservative	HUNTER, Wm. H.	2,299		

1896 Canadian federal election: Wellington Centre
Party	Candidate	Votes	%	±%
Liberal	SEMPLE, Andrew	1,917		
Conservative	LEWIS, F.W.	1,295		
Independent	GROVES, Abraham	752		
Independent	GORDON, W.L.	599		

1900 Canadian federal election: Wellington Centre
Party	Candidate	Votes	%	±%
Liberal-Conservative	MCGOWAN, John	2,364		
Liberal	SEMPLE, Andrew	2,079		

== See also ==
- List of Canadian electoral districts
- Historical federal electoral districts of Canada
