= Wellington (Ontario provincial electoral district) =

Former provincial electoral district in Ontario, Canada

Ontario electoral district

Defunct provincial electoral district
- Legislature: Legislative Assembly of Ontario
- District created: 1867
- District abolished: 1996
- First contested: 1867
- Last contested: 1995

Wellington was a provincial electoral district in Ontario, Canada. It existed in various incarnations and names throughout its existence. It started as Wellington North in 1867 but was abolished in 1879 after only three terms. It was re-established as Wellington Northeast in 1926 and then changed to Wellington North in 1934 which existed until 1955 when it became Wellington-Dufferin. The name was changed again in 1975 to become Wellington-Dufferin-Peel. In 1987 it underwent its final name change to Wellington until 1999 when it was abolished into Waterloo—Wellington before the 1999 election.

== Members of Provincial Parliament ==
Wellington
Assembly	Years	Member	Party
Wellington North
1st	1867–1871	Robert McKim	Liberal
2nd	1871–1874	John McGowan	Conservative
3rd	1875–1879	John McGowan	Conservative
Riding Abolished
Wellington Northeast
17th	1926–1929	George McQuibban	Liberal
18th	1934–1937	George McQuibban	Liberal
Wellington North
19th	1934–1937	George McQuibban	Liberal
20th	1937–1943	Ross McEwing	Liberal
21st	1943–1945	Ross McEwing	Liberal
22nd	1945–1948	Ross McEwing	Liberal
23rd	1948–1951	Ross McEwing	Liberal
24th	1951–1955	John Root	Progressive Conservative
Wellington-Dufferin
25th	1955–1959	John Root	Progressive Conservative
26th	1959–1963	John Root	Progressive Conservative
27th	1963–1967	John Root	Progressive Conservative
28th	1967–1971	John Root	Progressive Conservative
29th	1971–1975	John Root	Progressive Conservative
Wellington-Dufferin-Peel
30th	1975–1977	Jack Johnson	Progressive Conservative
31st	1977–1981	Jack Johnson	Progressive Conservative
32nd	1981–1985	Jack Johnson	Progressive Conservative
33rd	1985–1987	Jack Johnson	Progressive Conservative
Wellington
34th	1987–1990	Jack Johnson	Progressive Conservative
35th	1990–1995	Ted Arnott	Progressive Conservative
36th	1995–1999	Ted Arnott	Progressive Conservative
Sourced from the Ontario Legislative Assembly
Merged into Waterloo—Wellington then Wellington-Halton Hills

== Election results ==
1867 Ontario general election
Party	Candidate	Votes	%
Liberal	Robert McKim	1,434	51.29
Conservative	Mr. Beattie	1,362	48.71
Total valid votes		2,796	81.04
Eligible voters		3,450	
Liberal pickup new district.			
Source: Elections Ontario

1871 Ontario general election
Party	Candidate	Votes	%	±%
Liberal	Robert McKim	1,531	63.53	+12.24
Conservative	Mr. Cross	879	36.47	−12.24
Turnout		2,410	59.40	−21.64
Eligible voters		4,057		
Liberal hold		Swing		+12.24
Source: Elections Ontario

Ontario provincial by-election, February 1874 Resignation of Robert McKim
Party	Candidate	Votes	%	±%
Conservative	John McGowan	1,627	50.94	+14.47
Independent	Mr. O'Callaghan	1,567	49.06	
Total valid votes		3,194	100.0	+32.53
Conservative gain from Liberal		Swing		+14.47
Source: History of the Electoral Districts, Legislatures and Ministries of the Province of Ontario

== See also ==
- List of Ontario provincial electoral districts
- Canadian provincial electoral districts
