= Wroxeter, Ontario =

Coordinates: 43.864°N 81.149°W

Wroxeter
- Unincorporated village
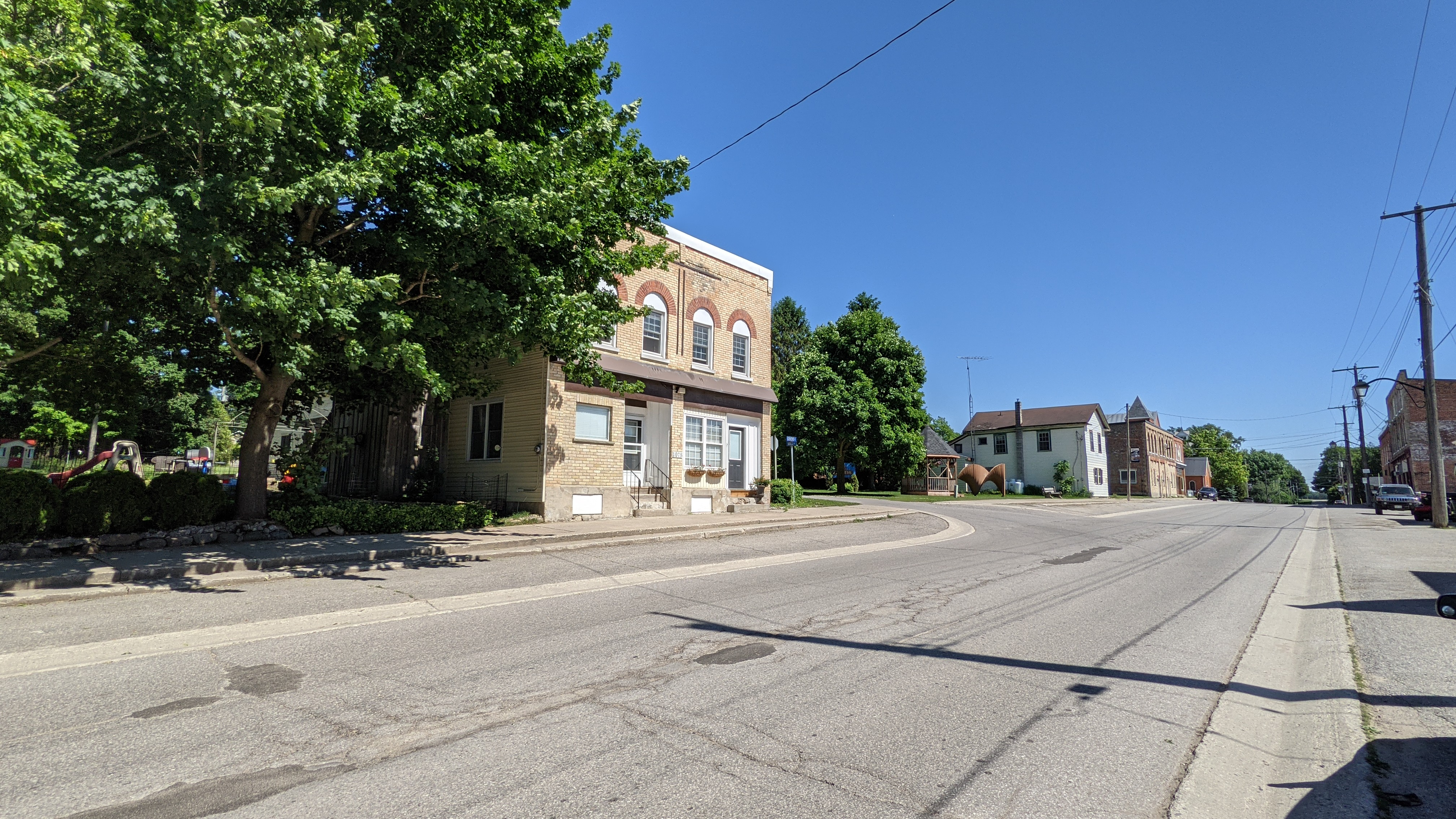
- Wroxeter, Ontario on 13 June 2021
- Interactive map of Wroxeter
- Country: Canada
- Province: Ontario
- County: Huron
- Township: Howick Township

Wroxeter, Ontario

Wroxeter, Ontario is a community in Howick Township, part of Huron County.

== History ==
The first settlers of Wroxeter were the Gibson brothers, Thomas and Robert, who founded the community in the mid-19th century. During its peak period, Wroxeter had five general stores, five hotels, two schools (which operated until 1950), a library, a woolen mill, a grist mill, and an arena, which stood until it was torn down in the late 1970s. Wroxeter also had a railway, completed in 1874, when a train station was constructed to connect the village to the Toronto area. The population of Wroxeter in the late 19th century is estimated to have been 700–800 people. Wroxeter became a village in 1875 but was dissolved into Howick Township in 1929. In 1948, the Township of Howick made Wroxeter an unincorporated village. Today, Wroxeter's old industries have vanished.

== Climate ==
Climate data for Wroxeter, elevation: 335 m or 1,099 ft, 1971-2000 normals and extremes
Month	Jan	Feb	Mar	Apr	May	Jun	Jul	Aug	Sep	Oct	Nov	Dec	Year
Average precipitation mm (inches)	85.0 (3.35)	55.8 (2.20)	62.5 (2.46)	65.9 (2.59)	86.7 (3.41)	85.3 (3.36)	77.2 (3.04)	99.1 (3.90)	99.3 (3.91)	78.8 (3.10)	92.4 (3.64)	88.9 (3.50)	976.9 (38.46)
Average rainfall mm (inches)	20.4 (0.80)	19.0 (0.75)	38.9 (1.53)	59.7 (2.35)	86.7 (3.41)	85.3 (3.36)	77.2 (3.04)	99.1 (3.90)	99.3 (3.91)	77.7 (3.06)	68.8 (2.71)	34.0 (1.34)	766.1 (30.16)
Average snowfall cm (inches)	64.6 (25.4)	36.8 (14.5)	23.6 (9.3)	6.2 (2.4)	0.0 (0.0)	0.0 (0.0)	0.0 (0.0)	0.0 (0.0)	0.0 (0.0)	1.1 (0.4)	23.7 (9.3)	54.8 (21.6)	210.8 (82.9)
Average precipitation days (≥ 0.2 mm)	13.6	9.4	9.6	9.4	9.3	8.6	7.5	8.4	9.7	10.7	11.7	12.8	120.7
Average rainy days (≥ 0.2 mm)	2.9	2.5	5.0	8.0	9.3	8.6	7.5	8.4	9.7	10.4	8.0	4.2	84.5
Average snowy days (≥ 0.2 cm)	11.1	7.1	5.0	1.6	0.0	0.0	0.0	0.0	0.0	0.33	4.1	9.1	38.33
Source: Environment Canada

== Gallery ==
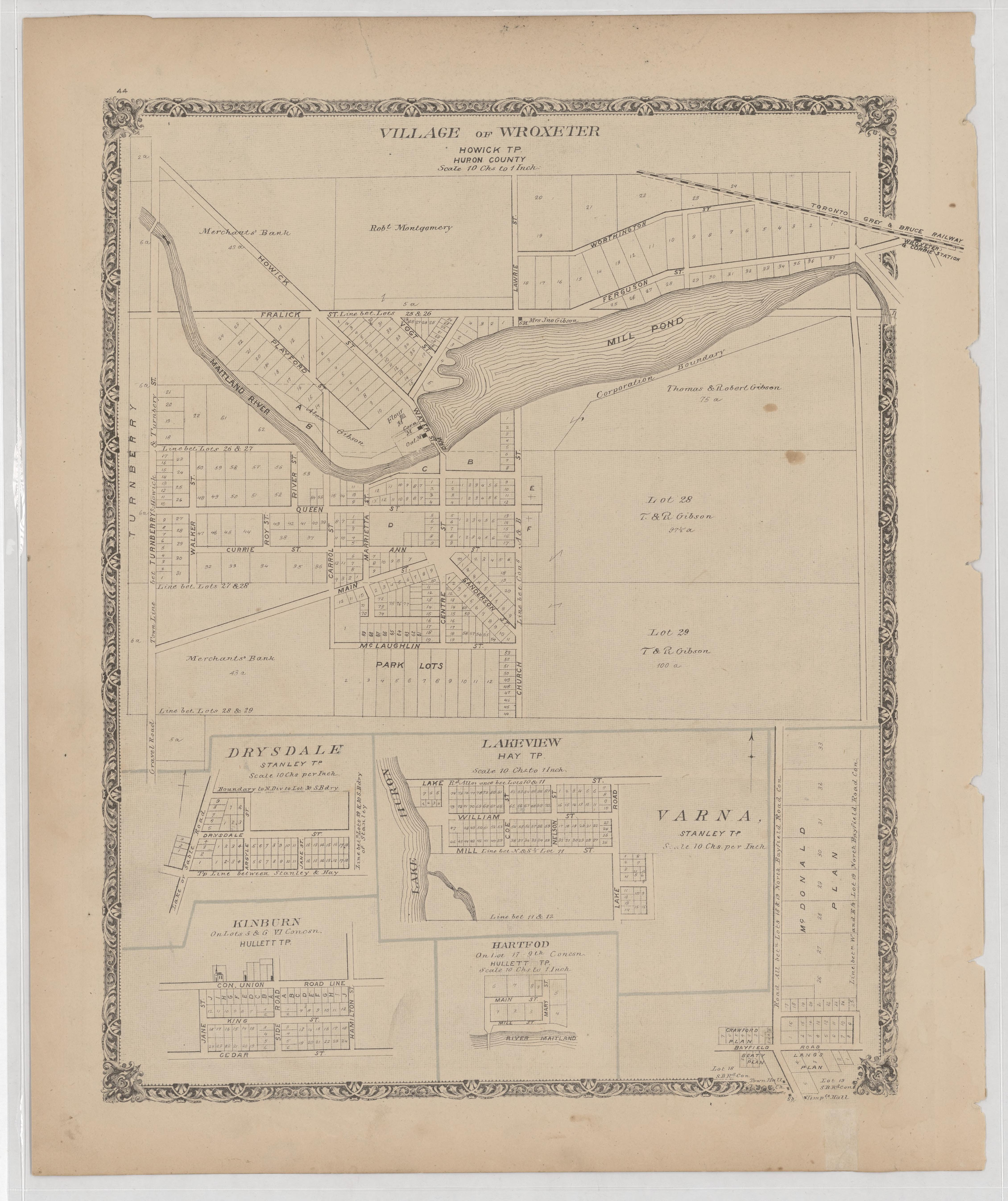
Map of the Village of Wroxeter, Township of Howick, Huron County, Ontario, Canada, H. Belden & Co., 1879

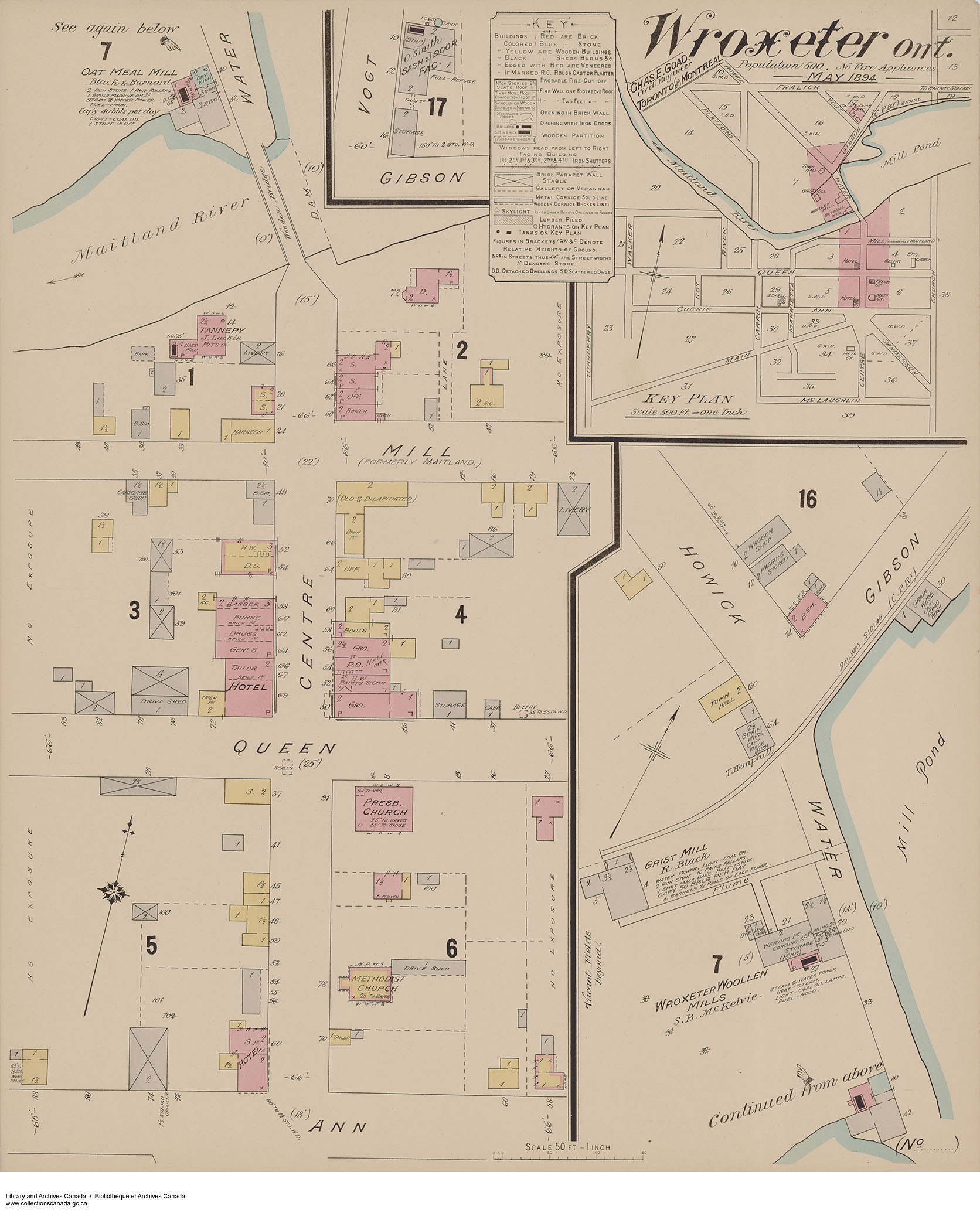
Map of Wroxeter, Ontario, Canada, by Charles E. Goad, May 1894

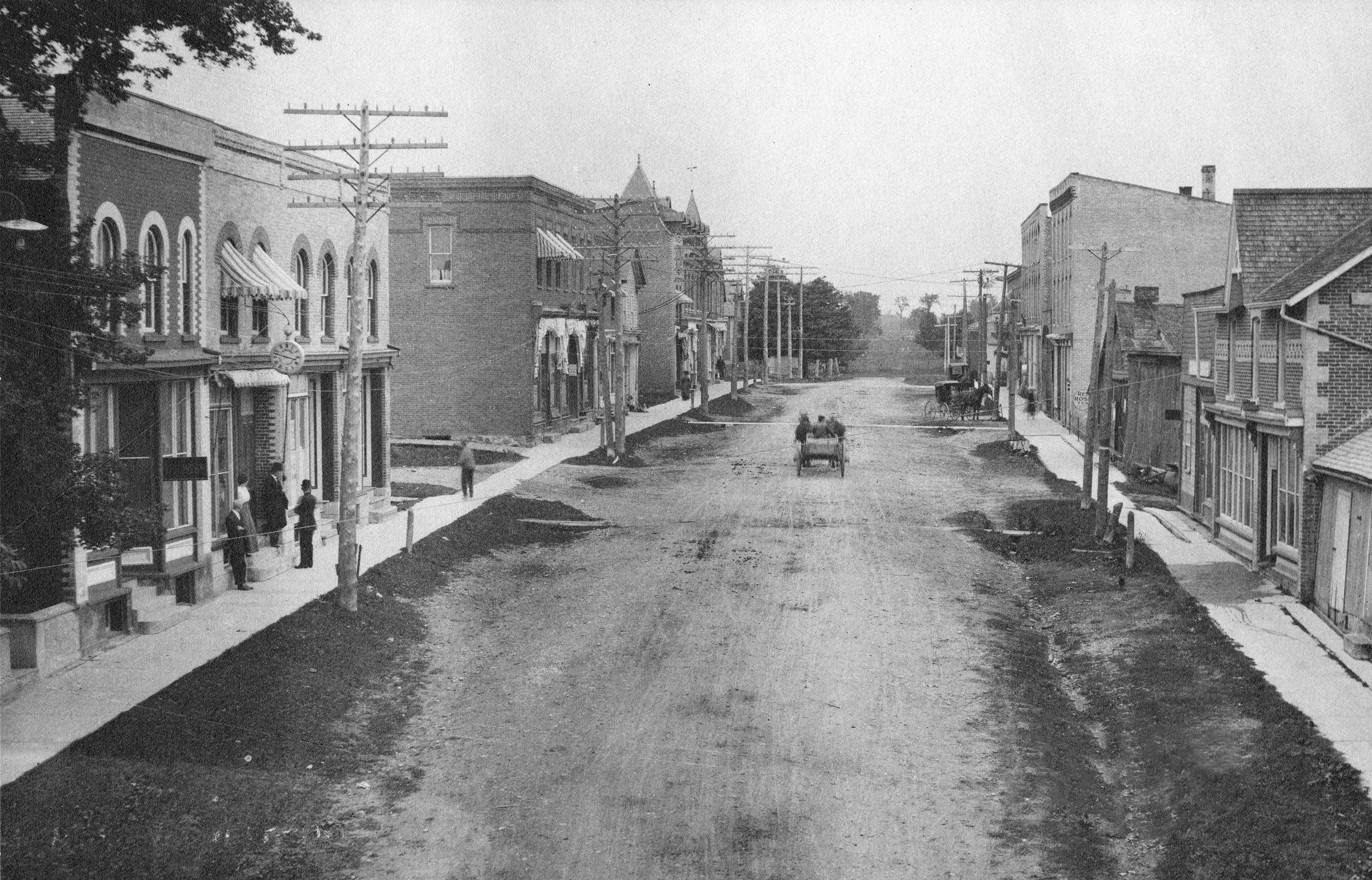
Centre Street, Wroxeter, Ontario, c. 1900–20

== See also ==
- List of unincorporated communities in Ontario
