= Nipissing Mine =

Silver mine in Cobalt, Ontario, Canada

Coordinates: 47.3913°N 79.6801°W

The Nipissing Mine is an abandoned silver mine in Cobalt, Ontario, Canada, located on Nip Hill on the east side of Long Lake.

It was developed in the subsequent Cobalt silver rush of 1903. The original 843 acres of claims were purchased by Ellis P. Earle from the Ferland Syndicate. By 1907, it was the top producing mine in the area. The company completely surrounded Peterson and Carr lakes and occupied the east side of Cobalt Lake. At its peak, the mine had ten shafts working three veins, the Kendall, Meyer and Fourth of July. Additionally, it used hydraulics to strip the overburden and employed an aerial tramway. The last dividend was paid in 1921 however. The mine continued to operate during the 1920s by harvesting remnants and areas overlooked during the early boom years. With the onset of the Great Depression, the price of silver collapsed and the mine became uneconomic. Underground exploration and rock breaking had ceased by 1932 and further production was from various rock dumps. In 1952 the company merged with O'Brien Mines to become Nipissing-O'Brien Mines with minor operations through extraction of floors and pillars in the old workings. The resultant company would later merge into Agnico Mines which was a forerunner to Agnico-Eagle Mines of today.
