= 2013 Ontario Mine Rescue Provincial Competition =

The 2013 Ontario Mine Rescue Provincial Competition was held June 5–7 at the South Windsor Recreation Complex, in Windsor, Ontario.

== List of competing teams ==
=== Kirkland Lake District ===
Kirkland Lake Gold - Macassa Mine

Position	Name
Captain	Pierre Belanger
2 Man	Nick Perrier
3 Man	Hugh Rodgers
4 Man	Hubert Gour
Vice Captain	Lino Therien
6 Man	Jonathan Gosselin
Briefing Officer	Cliff McGill
Coach	N/A
Mine Rescue Officer	Wayne Baker

=== Onaping District ===
Glencore - Xstrata Nickel

Position	Name
Captain	Gord Horseman
2 Man	Matt Lawrence
3 Man	Paul Leclair
4 Man	Yan Sirard
Vice Captain	Ivan Tymchuk
6 Man	Andre Lefebvre
Briefing Officer	Keith Allen
Coach	N/A
Mine Rescue Officer	John Hagan

=== Red Lake District ===
Goldcorp - Musselwhite Mine

Position	Name
Captain	Bernie Haley
2 Man	J.P. Lepage
3 Man	Andrew Legree
4 Man	Joseph Connolly
Vice Captain	Chris Horde
6 Man	Brad Towle
Briefing Officer	Leo Levac
Coach	N/A
Mine Rescue Officer	Grant Saunders, Duane Croswell

=== Southern District ===
Canadian Gypsum Company - Hagarsville Mine

Position	Name
Captain	Shawn Hunt
2 Man	Dan Rulli
3 Man	Scott DeGraaf
4 Man	Cory Edmonds
Vice Captain	Blair Walker
6 Man	Paul Hunt
Briefing Officer	Brandon King
Coach	N/A
Mine Rescue Officer	Tim Taylor

=== Sudbury District ===
Vale - West Mines

Position	Name
Captain	Lorne Beleskey
2 Man	Ron O'Bumsawin
3 Man	Gorden Sullivan
4 Man	Shawn St.Louis
Vice Captain	Jason Amyot
6 Man	Mark Jutras
Briefing Officer	Cory Thomas
Coach	N/A
Mine Rescue Officer	Bruce Hall

=== Timmins District ===
Glencore Xstrata Copper - Kidd Operations

Position	Name
Captain	Jason Leger
2 Man	Danny Morin
3 Man	Ted Hanley
4 Man	Guy Champagne
Vice Captain	Marc Villars
6 Man	Stewart Labine
Briefing Officer	Shawn Rideout
Coach	Jim Davis
Mine Rescue Officer	Danny Taillefer

=== Thunder Bay Algoma District ===
Wesdome - Eagle River Mine

Position	Name
Captain	Mike Krell
2 Man	Mike Bizier
3 Man	Neil Farrington
4 Man	James Greer
Vice Captain	Noel Lindell
6 Man	Manny Girard
Briefing Officer	Mark O'Connor
Coach	
Mine Rescue Officer	Tim Ebbinghaus

== List of competing technicians ==
District	Name	Company/Mine
Kirkland Lake	Jesse Vaillancourt	Aurico Gold - Young Davidson Mine
Onaping	Dave Griffiths	GlencoreXstrata Nickel - Sudbury Operations
Red Lake	Dan Rodrigue	Goldcorp - Musselwhite Mine
Southern	Drew Dalgleish	Compass Minerals - Goderich Mine
Sudbury	Derrick Parsons	Vale - West Mines
Timmins	Dave Payne	Goldcorp - Porcupine Gold Mines
Thunder Bay / Algoma	Denis Bilodeau	Barrick Gold - Hemlo

== Awards ==
Award	Winner	Runner up	3rd
Provincial Champions	GlencoreXstrata Copper - Kidd Operations	GlencoreXstrata Nickel - Sudbury Operations	N/A
Equipment Technician	Denis Bilodeau	Jesse Vaillancourt	Dave Payne
Firefighting	Wesdome - Eagle River Mine	N/A	N/A
First Aid	Canadian Gypsum Company - Hagarsville Mine	N/A	N/A
Special Equipment	Vale - West Mines	N/A	N/A
