= Ontario Mine Rescue =

Canadian mine rescue program

Logo

Ontario Mine Rescue is the program that creates, oversees and evaluates mine rescue training and standards in the province of Ontario. The Ontario Mine Rescue program is administered by Workplace Safety North, part of the prevention arm of the Ontario Ministry of Labour.

== History ==
Ontario Mine Rescue was born out of the tragedy of the Hollinger Mine fire that claimed the lives of 39 miners in Timmins in 1928. Neither the mine, the town or even the province had the expertise or the resources to respond to save their lives or adequately fight the fire. Mine rescue teams from Pittsburgh had to be called in to extinguish the fire, while recovery operations were left to local mine management. The resulting provincial royal commission recommended the creation of an Ontario Mine Rescue organization under the Department of Mines to respond to underground mine fires.

The 1947 East Malartic Fire marked a major turning point for Ontario Mine Rescue as teams from Timmins, Kirkland Lake and Sudbury responded to a call to help fight a mine fire in Malartic, Quebec. It was the first and only time Ontario Mine Rescue teams responded to an out-of-province emergency. While working together, it became evident each district had different training and maintenance standards. As a result, the position of Senior Mine Rescue Officer was created to ensure province-wide standards in mine rescue training and equipment maintenance were established and maintained.

In 1965, another mine fire in Timmins, this one at the McIntyre Mine, forced the organization to make another change. The underground distance rescue teams had to travel to reach the fire was so great that the two-hour McCaa apparatus was not sufficient to allow them time to fight the fire. In 1966, after investigating and testing different apparatus, the BG174 was purchased to allow for a four-hour capability. The BG174 proved a workhorse for almost 40 years before it was replaced by the BG4.

Ontario Mine Rescue took on added responsibility in 1984 after four miners were trapped and killed in a rockburst at Falconbridge No. 5 Shaft near Sudbury. The Stevenson Commission recommended that the organization's mandate be expanded to conduct training in and respond to non-fire emergencies. Training on non-fire rescue equipment began shortly after.

In January 2001, responsibility for Ontario Mine Rescue was transferred to the Mines and Aggregates Safety and Health Association, now a part of Workplace Safety North (WSN). The program changed from usage of the Draeger BG174 to the Drager BG4 self-contained breathing apparatus. Standardized competency based training programs were developed to ensure consistent delivery of information to mine rescue teams across the province.

== Mine rescue stations ==
Delaware Station

1988 - Present

Wawa Station

2016 - Present

Kirkland Lake Station

1931 - Present

Onaping Station

1968 - Present

Red Lake Station

1948 - Present

Sudbury Station

1932 - Present

Thunder Bay Station

1982 - 1987
2006 - Present

Timmins Station

1930 - Present

When mining activity ceases in thea jurisdiction, some stations that had been established for emergency response capability were closed or relocated.

Cobalt

1953 - 1992

Elliot Lake

1958 - 1998

Geraldton

1946 - 1977

Manitouwadge

1977 - 1982
1987 - 2005

== Ontario Mine Rescue Provincial Competition ==
Year	Annual Competition	Provincial Champions	District	Runner up	Location	Arena / Venue
2006	57th	Goldcorp - Porcupine Joint Venture (PJV)	Timmins District	Inco Ltd. - Sudbury West Mines	Timmins	Archie Dillon Sportsplex Arena
2007	58th	CVRD Inco - Sudbury East Mines	Sudbury District	Xstrata - Kidd Operations	Sault Ste. Marie	N / A
2008	59th	Xstrata Nickel - Fraser / TL Mines	Onaping District	Vale Inco - East Mines	Sudbury	Fecunis Mine
2009	60th	Vale Inco - Sudbury East Mines	Sudbury District	FNX Mining	Windsor	Windsor Expo Centre
2010	61st	Goldcorp - Porcupine Gold Mines (PGM)	Timmins District	Barrick Hemlo - Williams Mine	Timmins	Timmins Underground Gold Mine Tour
2011	62nd	Vale - Sudbury West Mines	Sudbury District	Barrick Hemlo - Williams Mine	Marathon	Barrick Gold - Williams Mine
2012	63rd	Barrick Hemlo - Williams Mine	Thunder Bay & Algoma District	Kirkland Lake Gold - Macassa Mine	Sudbury	Vale - Copper Cliff South Mine
2013	64th	Glencore - Kidd Operations	Timmins District	Glencore - Sudbury Integrated Nickel Operations	Windsor	South Windsor Recreation Complex
2014	65th	Vale - Sudbury East Mines	Sudbury District	Compass Minerals - Goderich Mine	Timmins	Goldcorp PGM - Dome Mine
2015	66th	Vale - Sudbury West Mines	Sudbury District	AuRico Gold - Young-Davidson Mine	Thunder Bay	Fort Williams Gardens Arena
2016	67th	Compass Minerals - Goderich Mine	Southern District	Lake Shore Gold - Timmins West & Bell Creek Mines	Sudbury	Fecunis Mine
2017	68th	Goldcorp Musselwhite Mine	Red Lake District	Tahoe Canada - Timmins West & Bell Creek Mines	Goderich	Compass Minerals Goderich Mine
2018	69th	Tahoe Canada - Timmins West & Bell Creek Mines	Timmins District	Vale - Sudbury East Mines	Matachewan	Alamos Gold Young-Davidson Mine
2019	70th	K+S Windsor Salt Ojibway Mine	Southern District	Newmont - Porcupine Gold Mines	Red Lake	Red Lake Gold Mines

== 2016 International Mine Rescue Competition ==
Ontario Mine Rescue hosted the 10th International Mines Rescue Competition (IMRC 2016) in Sudbury, Ontario. The competition is held every two years by the governing mine rescue body of the host nation or jurisdiction. The 2016 event marked the first time the competition was held in Canada.

== See also ==
- Drägerman and Drägerwoman
- Self-contained breathing apparatus
