= 2015 Ontario Mine Rescue Provincial Competition =

The 2015 Ontario Mine Rescue Provincial Competition was held June 10–12 at the Fort Williams Gardens Arena, in Thunder Bay, Ontario.

== List of competing teams ==
=== Kirkland Lake District ===
AuRico Gold - Young-Davidson mine

Position	Name
Captain	Shawn Deforge
2 Man	Joey Roy
3 Man	Trevor Hale
4 Man	Jesse Vaillancourt
Vice Captain	Pierre Belanger
6 Man	Marc Leveille
Briefing Officer	Jeff St.Martin
Coach	N/A
Mine Rescue Officer	Wayne Baker

=== Onaping District ===
Glencore - Sudbury Integrated Nickel Operations

Position	Name
Captain	Matt Lawrence
2 Man	Ivan Tymchuk
3 Man	Eric Perreault
4 Man	Andrew Jorgensen
Vice Captain	Richard Roy
6 Man	Andre Lefebvre
Briefing Officer	Paul Leclair
Coach	N/A
Mine Rescue Officer	John Hagan

=== Red Lake District ===
Goldcorp - Red Lake Gold Mines

Position	Name
Captain	Pierre Peloquin
2 Man	Heather Willis
3 Man	Christian Siford
4 Man	Ron Ouellette
Vice Captain	Tim Boucha
6 Man	Mickey Gilbart
Briefing Officer	Dave Hay
Coach	Darren Bullied
Mine Rescue Officer	Grant Saunders

=== Southern District ===
Compass Minerals - Goderich Mine

Position	Name
Captain	Jim Ahrens
2 Man	Pete Kohnert
3 Man	DEnnis Hogan
4 Man	Chris Lamerant
Vice Captain	Matt VandenHeuvel
6 Man	Jack Miller
Briefing Officer	Drew Anderson
Coach	N/A
Mine Rescue Officer	Tim Taylor

=== Sudbury District ===
Vale - West Mines

Position	Name
Captain	Kevin Duff
2 Man	Gord Sullivan
3 Man	Jeff Farquharson
4 Man	Jim Niesing
Vice Captain	Darren Toner
6 Man	Mario Ceccon
Briefing Officer	Paul Aho
Coach	Paul Frising, Dennis Gosselin
Mine Rescue Officer	Tim Ebbinghaus

=== Timmins District ===
Dumas Contracting Limited

Position	Name
Captain	Shawn Rideout
2 Man	Mike Carroll
3 Man	Nicholas Schwehr
4 Man	Yannick Marchand
Vice Captain	Yves Guillemette
6 Man	Pete Gagne
Briefing Officer	Neil MacInnes
Coach	Ken Levoy, Dave Bernier, Brent Woods
Mine Rescue Officer	Manny Cabral & Danny Taillefer

=== Thunder Bay Algoma District ===
Barrick Hemlo Williams Mine

Position	Name
Captain	Glenn Young
2 Man	Russell Eagle
3 Man	Brian Greenwood
4 Man	Scott Martin
Vice Captain	Brad Brzeczka
6 Man	Brian Randell
Briefing Officer	Andrew Constantin
Coach	Terry Gregorash
Mine Rescue Officer	Denis Leduc, Duane Croswell

== List of competing technicians ==
District	Name	Company/Mine
Kirkland Lake	Remi Toupin	Primero Mining - Black Fox Mine
Onaping	Dino Buttazzoni	Glencore Sudbury Integrated Nickel Operations
Red Lake	Aaron Maki	Goldcorp - Red Lake Gold Mines
Southern	Dan Rulli	CGC - Hagarsville Mine
Sudbury	Denis Prevost	First Nickel - Lockerby Mine
Timmins	Terry Sprowl	Goldcorp - Porcupine Gold Mines
Thunder Bay / Algoma	Jason Leclair	Barrick Gold - Hemlo

== Awards ==
Award	Winner	Runner up	3rd
Provincial Champions			N/A
Equipment Technician			
Firefighting		N/A	N/A
First Aid		N/A	N/A
Special Equipment		N/A	N/A
