= 2017 Ontario Mine Rescue Provincial Competition =

The 2017 Ontario Mine Rescue Provincial Competition was held June 6-9 at Compass Minerals Goderich Mine, in Goderich, Ontario.

== List of competing teams ==
=== Kirkland Lake District ===
Kirkland Lake Gold North Complex (Holt McDermott & Taylor Mines)

Position	Name
Captain	Jonathan Boutin
2 Man	Jonathan Aubry
3 Man	Justin Arsenault
4 Man	Scott Gillett
Vice Captain	Ben Young
6 Man	Patrick Adams
Briefing Officer	Erik Barr
Coach	Terry McKnight
Mine Rescue Officer	Shawn Shail & Wayne Baker

=== Onaping District ===
Glencore - Sudbury Integrated Nickel Operations

Position	Name
Captain	Andrew Jorgensen
2 Man	Rock Carriere
3 Man	Dave Wylie
4 Man	Pat Robitaille
Vice Captain	Max Kant
6 Man	Peter Robichaud
Briefing Officer	Paul Leclair
Coach	N/A
Mine Rescue Officer	Walter Adler & Gord Sullivan

=== Red Lake District ===
Goldcorp - Musselwhite Mine

Position	Name
Captain	Chris Horde
2 Man	Andrew Legree
3 Man	Steve Godin
4 Man	Ryan Lepage
Vice Captain	Holly Robinson
6 Man	Robin Jilks
Briefing Officer	Brad Towle
Coach	Denis Leduc
Mine Rescue Officer	Grant Saunders, Mike Krell & Duane Croswell

=== Southern District ===
Canadian Gypsum Company - Hagersville Mine

Position	Name
Captain	Dan Brown
2 Man	Justin Reinbrecht
3 Man	Scott Walton
4 Man	Darren Martin
Vice Captain	Jim Winkworth
6 Man	Travis Mitchell
Briefing Officer	Shawn Hunt
Coach	N/A
Mine Rescue Officer	Dan Rulli

=== Sudbury District ===
Vale - West Mines

Position	Name
Captain	Jeff Farquharson
2 Man	Roch Berthiaume
3 Man	Nick Cecconi
4 Man	Aaron Brouse
Vice Captain	Mario Ceccon
6 Man	Dustin Hirschfeld
Briefing Officer	Lorne Belesky
Coach	Paul Frising, Shawn St-Louis
Mine Rescue Officer	Dan Davidson & Danny Taillefer

=== Timmins District ===
Tahoe Canada, Timmins West & Bell Creek Mines

Position	Name
Captain	Adam Weagle
2 Man	Sylvain Falardeau
3 Man	Nicholas Schwehr
4 Man	Pete Gagne
Vice Captain	Yannick Marchand
6 Man	Jon Beaulieu
Briefing Officer	Terry Roy
Coach	Jim Davis, Brent Woods, Pete Joliat
Mine Rescue Officer	Jason Leger

=== Thunder Bay Algoma District ===
North American Palladium Lac des Isles Mine

Position	Name
Captain	Mike Newbold
2 Man	Rylan Vesa
3 Man	Dave Chony
4 Man	Cody Vold
Vice Captain	Justin Wilson
6 Man	Cyle Wheeldon
Briefing Officer	Trevor Puumala
Coach	Mike Van Roon, Gord Paddock
Mine Rescue Officer	Duane Croswell

== List of competing technicians ==
District	Name	Company/Mine
Kirkland Lake	Norm Gannon Jr.	Kirkland Lake Gold Macassa Mine
Onaping	Simone Hensher	Glencore Sudbury Integrated Nickel Operations
Red Lake	Dave Hay	Goldcorp - Red Lake Gold Mines
Southern	Rick Reid	K+S Windsor Salt Ojibway Mine
Sudbury	Ron Weaver	Vale East Mines
Timmins	Dan Guillemette	Tahoe Canada Timmins West & Bell Creek Mines
Thunder Bay / Algoma	Steeve Pinel	Richmont Island Gold Mine

== Awards ==
Award	Winner	Runner up	3rd
Provincial Champions	Goldcorp Musselwhite Mine	Tahoe Canada, Timmins West & Bell Creek Mines	N / A
Equipment Technician	Ron Weaver, Vale East Mines	Rick Reid, K+S Windsor Salt Ojibway Mine	Simone Hensher, Glencore Sudbury INO
Firefighting	Goldcorp Musselwhite Mine	N/A	N/A
First Aid	North American Palladium, Lac des Isles Mine	N/A	N/A
Special Equipment	Goldcorp Musselwhite Mine	N/A	N/A
