= Timmins Underground Gold Mine Tour =

Tourist attraction in Timmins, Ontario

The Timmins Underground Gold Mine Tour was a tourist attraction owned and operated by the City of Timmins from 1990 to 2013.

== History ==
The tour originally opened in 1984 at the McIntyre Mine, but was relocated to its current site at the former Hollinger Mine in 1990. The site was donated in 1990 by Goldcorp, owner of Porcupine Gold Mines, to the City of Timmins to operate an Underground Gold Mine Tour, and later in 2000 GoldCorp donated an adjacent parcel of property on which to build the Shania Twain Centre.

== Location ==
Prior to demolition, the Shania Twain Centre and the Underground Gold Mine Tour were located at 1 Shania Twain Drive in the City of Timmins. Both attractions were situated on a 65-acre site, located adjacent to the former 250 acre Hollinger Mine site, approximately 1.5 km southeast of downtown Timmins.

== About the mine ==
The Timmins Underground Gold Mine Tour was an educational and interactive family attraction, dedicated to the gold mining history of Timmins and the surrounding region. The tour's move to its final site was primarily because of the cost and complexity of running a tourism attraction on an active mining property, and also because of the barriers to expansion at the McIntyre site. The current site included 12 authentic historically significant buildings situated on 65 acres, which form part of the surface tour; together with a 150-metre mine shaft which leads visitors into the underground mine. The Timmins Underground Gold Mine Tour and Museum was incorporated on January 21, 1994. At a capital cost of $2 million, an Alimak elevator lift was added in 2002, which could also transport visitors to and from the underground mine and tour, together with additional underground displays and a theatre production. In 2010, a 1940s locomotive that operated at Pamour Mine for years was relocated and restored as a fully operational locomotive at the Underground Gold Mine Tour. The surface tour was led by Junior Guides (students), while the underground tour was led by Senior Guides (retired miners). Visitors experience a "typical day" in the life of a miner, including the "Dry" where visitors suit up with protective overalls, a hard hat, and a miner's lamp and battery pack, before walking or taking the elevator into the depths of the mine to begin their "shift". During the tour, the retired miner explained the various aspects of the mining operation, equipment and safety features, while visitors are led through the tunnels. Underground tour features included: the operation of two different rock drills and a slusher; a mine rescue station; an underground rail ride; demonstrations of mining skills including scaling, loading a blast and a mock blast display; a large gold nugget, and an underground theatre where productions highlighting various aspects of mining are shown, while visitor's wait for the vertical lift. Upon surfacing, visitors could walk through time on the Prospector's Trail, via a surface tour to the various buildings, including: the last remaining Hollinger House, that was built to accommodate the miners and their families upon their arrival to Timmins; a typical Prospector's Cabin; a Sluice for Gold Panning; and the Jupiter Headframe Lookout tower; before ending their "shift" and receiving their "pay cheque for a day's wages. The attraction was open on a seasonal basis from mid May to October 31, and offered 2 tours per day in the Spring and Fall months from Wednesday to Sunday (5 days per week). The Gold Mine Tour Gallery Room was the temporary location of the Timmins Museum National Exhibition Centre from 2007 to 2010, when it relocated from its former South Porcupine address, during which time it was undergoing plans for its new location within the On-Line Services (OLS) building on Spruce Street South in downtown Timmins. From 2005 to 2008, and since the Timmins Museum's collection was removed in 2010, the Gold Mine Tour Gallery Room was utilized for meeting and event rentals.

== Ontario Mine Rescue competition ==
In June 2010, the mine was host to the Ontario Mine Rescue provincial competition. The competition was won by GoldcorpPorcupine Gold Mines.

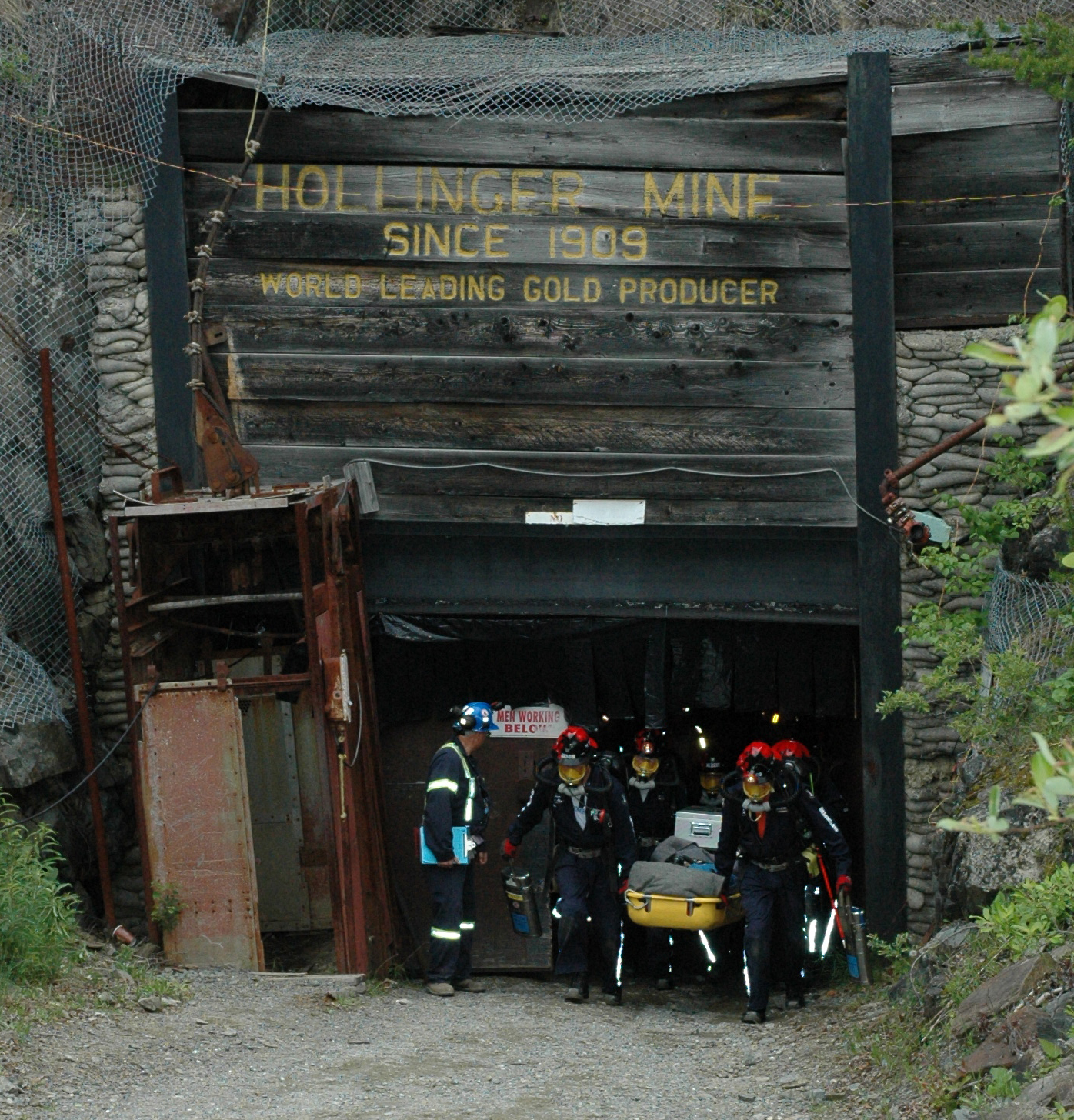
A Mine Rescue team emerges from the Timmins Underground Gold Mine Tour during the 2010 Ontario Mine Rescue Provincial Competition.
