= Dräger =

Dräger or Draeger may refer to:

- Dräger (surname)
- Dräger (company), a German company which makes breathing and protection equipment, gas detection and analysis systems, and noninvasive patient monitoring technologies
- Mount Draeger in Antarctica
