= International Mines Rescue Competition =

The International Mines Rescue Competition (IMRC) is a biennial event which facilitates the testing of underground emergency response capability across global mining and Mine Rescue jurisdictions. The competition is held by the governing mine rescue body of the host nation or jurisdiction.

The purpose of the IMRC is to present realistic simulations that will allow organizers to:

- 1. Evaluate skills required to perform rescue operations in a mining environment.
- 2. Judge participants in an open and transparent manner.
- 3. Provide feedback to all participants.
- 4. Promote Mine Rescue through improved communication, co-operation and knowledge transfer between responders, mine operators, suppliers, regulators and educators.

== International Mine Rescue Competitions ==
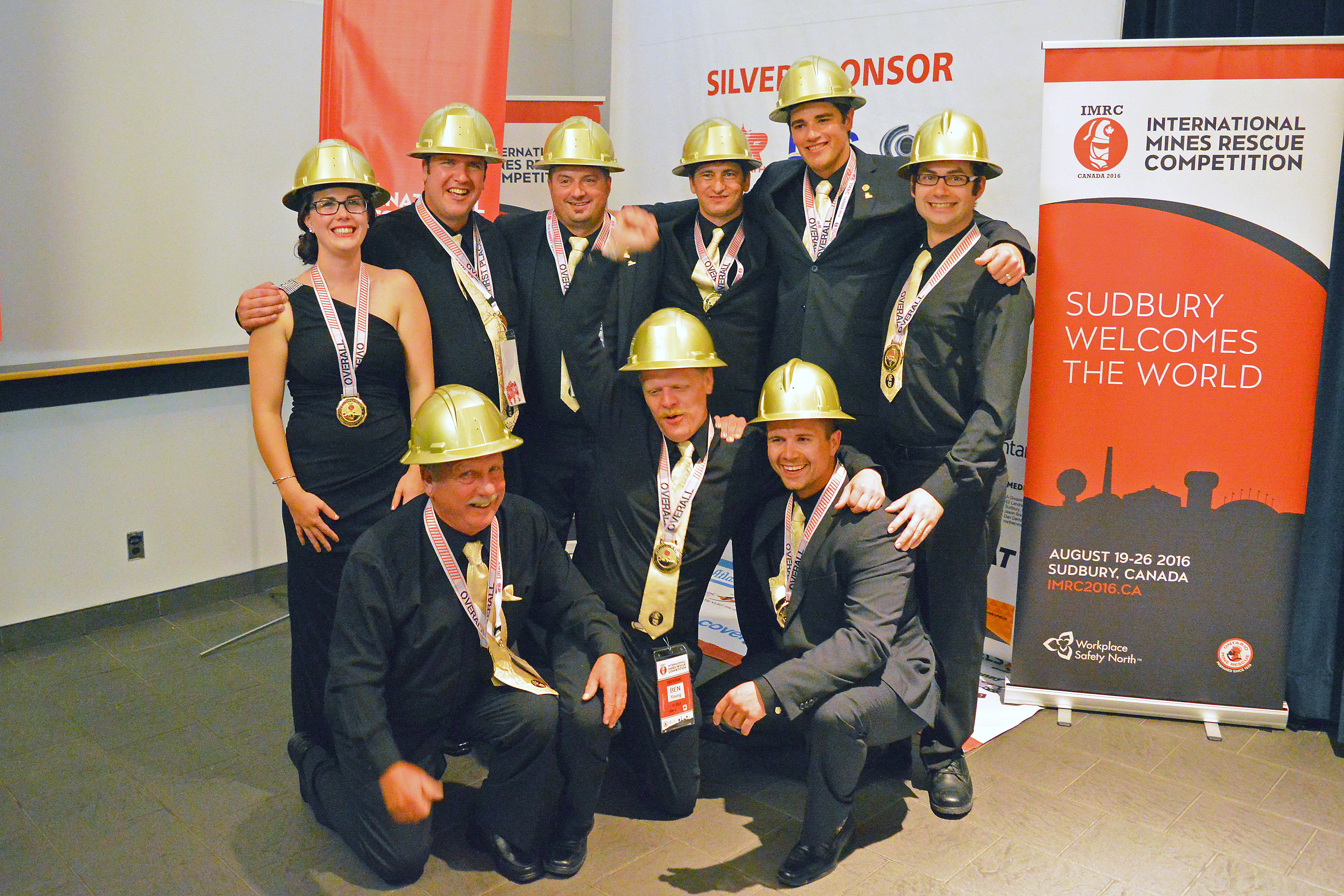
2016 International Mine Rescue Competition Overall Champions: Kirkland Lake Gold (Canada)

Year	Annual Competition	Overall Champions	2nd Overall	3rd Overall	Location	City / Venue
1998	1st	United States	TBD	TBD	United States	Louisville
2000	2nd	Poland	TBD	TBD	United States	Las Vegas
2002	3rd	United States	TBD	TBD	United States	Reno
2004	4th	Poland	TBD	TBD	Poland	Glogow
2006	5th	China	TBD	TBD	China	Pingdingshan
2008	6th	Australia	TBD	TBD	United States	Reno
2010	7th	Australia	TBD	TBD	Australia	Woonona
2012	8th	Ukraine	TBD	TBD	Ukraine	Donetsk
2014	9th	Poland - Central Mine Rescue Station - Bytom	TBD	TBD	Poland	Katowice
2016	10th	Canada - Kirkland Lake Gold	Ireland - Boliden Tara Mine	Poland - KGHM White Eagles	Canada	Sudbury
2018	11th	TBD	TBD	TBD	Russia	Novokuznetsk

=== 2016 International Mine Rescue Competition ===
Ontario Mine Rescue hosted the 10th International Mines Rescue Competition (IMRC 2016) in Sudbury, Ontario. The 2016 event marked the first time the competition was held in Canada.

Event	Participation	Overall Champions	2nd Overall	3rd Overall	Location/Venue
Technician	Optional	Russia - EMERCOM	China - Shaanxi Coal and Chemical Group	USA - MSHA	NORCAT Training Center
Theory Exam	Mandatory	Canada - Compass Minerals Goderich Mine	International - Goldcorp Americas	Canada - Vale Sudbury West Mines	Cambrian College
First Aid	Optional (Scoring)	Australia - Peabody Energy Wambo Coal	Ireland - Boliden Tara Mines	Canada - Cameco McArthur River Mine	Vale 175 Orebody (Surface)
High Angle Rope Rescue	Optional (Scoring)	Poland - KGHM White Eagles	Canada - Cameco McArthur River Mine	Canada - Vale Sudbury West Mines	Dynamic Earth Chasm
Underground Firefighting	Mandatory	Poland - Weglokoks Kraj Bytom	USA - MSHA	Canada - Cameco McArthur River Mine	Lively Underground Research Center (Underground)
Underground Mine Rescue	Mandatory	Canada - Kirkland Lake Gold	Canada - Compass Minerals Goderich Mine	Ireland - Boliden Tara Mines	Vale 114 Orebody (Underground)
Overall	N / A	Canada - Kirkland Lake Gold	Ireland - Boliden Tara Mine	Poland - KGHM White Eagles	Sudbury

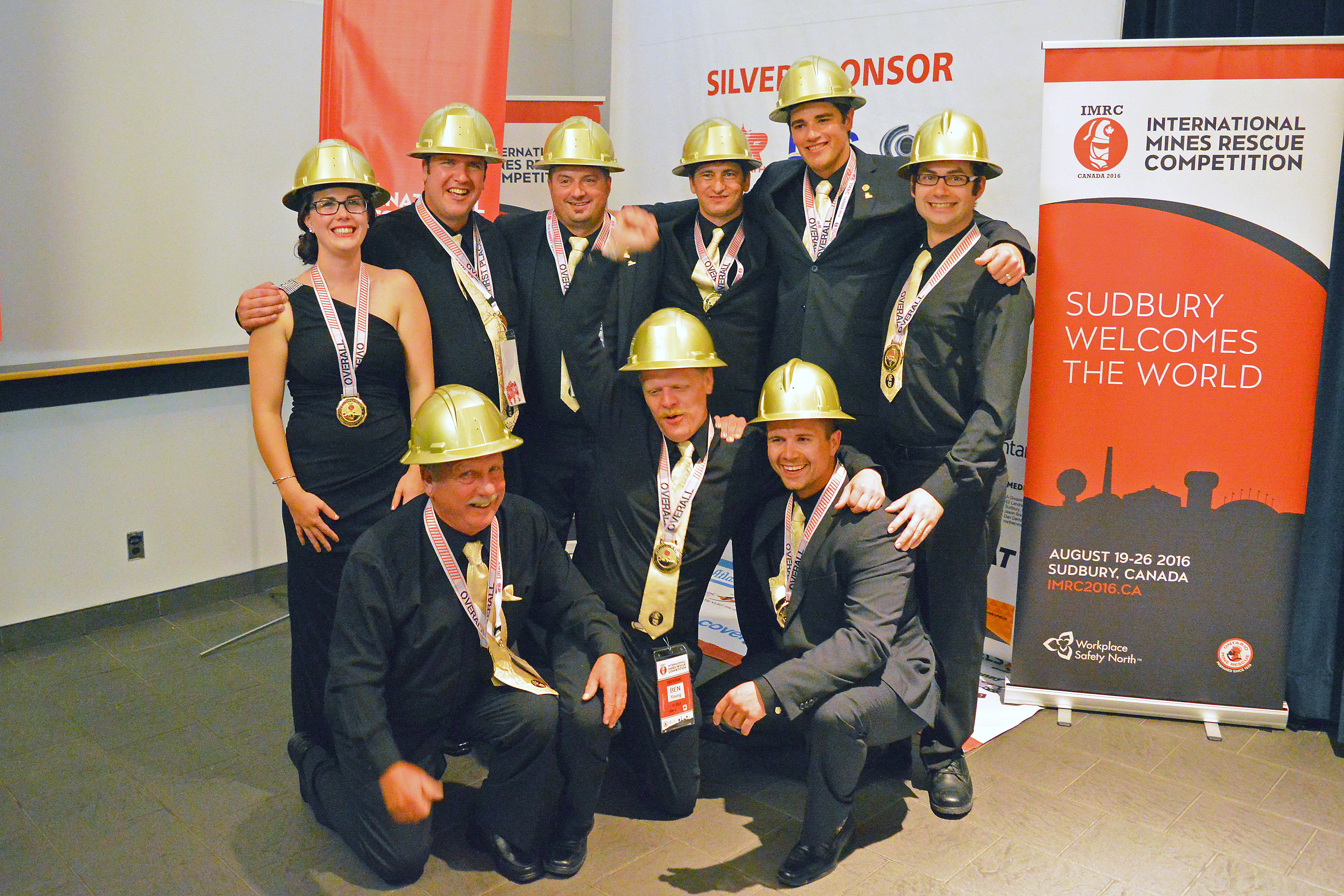
2016 International Mine Rescue Competition Overall Champions: Kirkland Lake Gold (Canada)

== See also ==
- Drägerman and Drägerwoman
