= Dräger (surname) =

Dräger or Draeger is a German surname. Notable people with the surname include:

- Alexander Bernhard Dräger (1870–1928), German engineer, industrialist and inventor
- Andreas Dräger (born 1980), German bioinformatician and systems biologist
- Anton Josef Dräger (1794–1833), German painter
- Christoph Draeger (born 1965), Swiss multimedia artist
- Donn F. Draeger (1922–1982), American teacher and practitioner of Japanese martial arts
- Guus Dräger (1917–1989), Dutch association football player
- Lisa Dräger (1920–2015), German businesswoman
- Lothar Dräger (1927–2016), German comic writer
- Marie-Louise Dräger (born 1981), German rower
- Richard Draeger (born 1937), American rower
