= Northern Ontario Heritage Fund =

Ontario government agency

The Northern Ontario Heritage Fund Corporation (NOHFC) is a Crown corporation and development agency of the Ministry of Northern Development and Mines in the Canadian province of Ontario, whose purpose is to provide funding and program support to foster economic development in the economically disadvantaged Northern Ontario region.

The NOHFC concentrates on six key funding programs: job creation, technology research and development, infrastructure and community development, youth entrepreneurship, youth internship and cooperative education, and generation and conservation of renewable energy.

== History ==
First announced in the David Peterson government's 1987 throne speech, the NOHFC's creation was included in the 1988 provincial budget, and the enabling legislation was given royal assent on June 7, 1988. At the time, it was set up as a short-term program which was slated to conclude in 1999; it has since seen periodic funding expansions and term extensions, and continues to run today, although as of 2020 the NOHFC has still not been officially converted into a permanent program.

The organization's first board, consisting of 19 representatives from various cities and towns across the region, was named in July 1988. One of the NOHFC's first large-scale investments was a $7.6 million contribution to the creation and construction of the Sudbury Neutrino Observatory.

In its earliest years, the NOHFC received some criticism focusing on allegations that it was too often used as an emergency bailout fund for failing natural resource companies rather than as a mechanism to actively encourage economic development or diversification, and that it lacked sufficient controls to prevent it from becoming misused as a vote-buying slush fund.

=== 1990s ===
In 1990, the NOHFC gave a $5 million grant to the Algoma Central Railway, which opposition Progressive Conservative leader Mike Harris alleged was a "down payment" on a secret deal to have the provincial government take over ownership and operation of the troubled company. Other investments in the early 1990s included a $1 million loan to Muscocho Explorations and McNellen Resources to fund construction of a new gold mine in Wawa, a $900 thousand loan to Brinkman and Associates, a tree-planting firm, and a $5 million loan to Bombardier Transportation to expand the company's facility in Thunder Bay.

In 1995, the Auditor General of Ontario's annual report criticized the NOHFC for not having sufficient monitoring programs in place to ensure that its investments were actually achieving their job creation goals.

In the late 1990s, the NOHFC was a key investor in new projects such as the Northern Ontario Tourism Marketing Partnership, NORCAT and the Northern Academic Health Science Network. The organization also continued to make grants or loans to existing companies or organizations to expand their operations, including grants to Cinéfest to expand its marketing and advertising, and to Science North for the creation of its F. Jean MacLeod Butterfly Gallery.

=== 2000s ===
In the early 2000s, the NOHFC invested $16 million in the creation of a fibre-optic network to improve the region's internet and telecommunications services, and made a $3.5 million grant toward the construction of Sudbury's Dynamic Earth.

In this era, the NOHFC began to receive criticism for expanding its service area to include the Muskoka District, a region outside the traditional boundaries of Northern Ontario. This decision was made by then-finance minister Ernie Eves, who was the MPP for Parry Sound—Muskoka at the time, and was later reversed by Greg Sorbara in the 2004 provincial budget.
