= Lisa Dräger =

German businesswoman

Lisa Dräger née Jansen (born August 20, 1920, in Hamburg-Rissen - February 18, 2015 in Lübeck) was a German businesswoman and patron of the arts in Lübeck.

== Life ==
After attending school in Itzehoe, she trained as a technical draftswoman in Berlin. She then found a job in the medical-technical department of Drägerwerk in 1941. In 1947, she married Heinrich Dräger. It was his third marriage. They had four children from this marriage, two daughters and two sons. The couple are credited with various initiatives for monument protection and the hiking trail on the Wakenitz ("Drägerweg").

Lisa Dräger was a co-founder of the Lübeck chapter of the Deutscher Kinderschutzbund in 1960, which later made her an honorary member. She played a major role in the establishment of a memorial for Thomas Mann and his brother Heinrich in the Buddenbrookhaus and in the preservation of the Behnhaus (Drägerhaus) as well as in the construction of the ship Lisa von Lübeck. She was associated with the German Life-Saving Society as a patron; a lifeboat is named after her, which is often used to accompany races. She was one of the founders of the Zonta International service club in Lübeck and was its local president in 1986/1987. She initiated the non-profit organization Weltkulturgut Hansestadt Lübeck, founded in 1991, which appointed her honorary chairwoman. In 1999, she endowed a visiting professorship for the Fachhochschule Lübeck. In 2008, she was the editor of a book about the development years of the Drägerwerk. In 2009, she founded the open Lisa Dräger Foundation. Its purpose is, among other things, to support cooperative educational assistance, preventive school support and the society Weltkulturgut Hansestadt Lübeck. The foundation is managed by her daughter Marianne Dräger (* 1954).

On February 18, 2015, Lisa Dräger died at the age of 94.

== Awards ==
- Medal of Honor of the University of Lübeck, then Lübeck Medical School (1977)
- Federal Cross of Merit on ribbon, awarded for her services to the cultural and social life of the city of Lübeck and the Medical School (September 1981)
- Gold commemorative coin of the Gesellschaft zur Beförderung gemeinnütziger Tätigkeit (1984)
- Senate plaque of the Hanseatic City of Lübeck (1990)
- Honorary citizenship of the Fachhochschule Lübeck (2000)
- Honorary chairmanship of the German Thomas Mann Society (2000)
- Bene Merenti Commemorative Coin (2005)
- Honorary Chairmanship of the Society World Cultural Heritage Hanseatic City of Lübeck (2009)
