= Los Filos mine =

Gold mine in Mexico

- Location: Guerrero, Mexico
- Products: Gold
- Company: Equinox Gold

The Los Filos mine is one of the largest gold mines in Mexico and in the world. The mine is located in the south of the country in Guerrero. The mine has estimated reserves of 7.43 million oz of gold and 52.54 million oz of silver. In January 2017, Goldcorp sold the mine to Leagold Mining Corporation for $438 million as part of a divestment of non-core assets. In 2020, Leagold was acquired by Equinox Gold, making Los Filos now owned by Equinox Gold.
