= Wesdome Gold Mines =

Canadian mining company, founded 1976

Wesdome Gold Mines Ltd.
- Type: Public
- Traded as: TSX: WDO
- Industry: Gold Mine
- Founded: 1976
- Headquarters: Toronto, Ontario, Canada
- Key people: Duncan Middlemiss President & CEO
- Number of employees: 130
- Website: www.wesdome.com

Wesdome Gold Mines Ltd. is a mining, exploration and development company based in Toronto, Ontario, focused primarily on gold.

== History ==
Wesdome Gold Mines Inc. was created as a joint venture in 1976 for the purpose of exploring and developing the Wesdome property in Val d'Or, Quebec, Canada. Wesdome derives its name from the joint venture between Western Quebec Mines Inc. and Dome Mines Limited.

In 1997 Western Quebec Mines bought out Dome Mines' interest.

In 1999 Wesdome Gold Mines Inc. became a publicly listed company. Wesdome Gold Mines proceeded with its advanced exploration and development on the wholly owned property.

In December 2003, Western Quebec Mines Inc. purchased the Kiena Complex and subsequently put the property into Wesdome Gold Mines Inc., completing and consolidating the Wesdome land package around Lac De Montigny. Wesdome Gold Mines' Val d'Or assets include 7,500 hectares of wholly owned property on the Kiena, Wesdome, Shawkey and Siscoe properties, as well as a 920-metre shaft, 2000 tpd CIP mill and extensive surface and underground infrastructure.

On February 1, 2006, River Gold Mines Ltd. merged with Wesdome Gold Mines Inc., to create Wesdome Gold Mines Ltd. River Gold Mines Ltd. was formed in 1994 to consolidate ownership of the Eagle River property, located 50 km west of Wawa, Ontario. In the low gold price environment from 1997 to 2002, all other known gold deposits and mining infrastructure in the Mishibishu greenstone belt were acquired. As of January 2017, the Wawa assets had produced 1.1 million ounces of gold. Wesdome Gold Mines' Wawa assets include 5200+ hectares of wholly owned property on the Eagle River and Mishi properties, a 580-metre shaft, a 1000 tpd Merril Crowe milling facility, and over 75 kilometres of underground development.

On July 10, 2007, Wesdome Gold Mines Ltd. merged with Western Quebec Mines Inc. In doing so, Wesdome added 1000 contiguous hectares to its already large Val d'Or land package, removed the controlling shareholder and simplified its corporate structure.

In January 2017 Wesdome reported a new gold discovery at its Eagle River Mine. Underground drilling returned multiple high-gold intercepts including 7.08 g/t Au uncut over 8.88 metres and 28.72 g/t Au uncut over 20.67 metres.

== Environmental Issues ==
On February 22, 2016, Wesdome Gold Mines Ltd. was convicted of discharging tailings into Mirion Creek between January 1, 2012 and May 7, 2013. These discharges were not reported to the Ministry of the Environment and Climate Change (MOECC) and were revealed by a joint investigation by the MOECC and Environment Canada. Wesdome Gold Mines Ltd. has now been placed on the MOECC's Environmental Offenders Registry.

In 2016 Wesdome Gold Mines Ltd. applied to the MOECC to use a water body adjacent to their Eagle River Milling Complex to deposit tailings waste in. The tailings will be coming from the Mishi open-pit mine, and the Eagle River Milling Complex. These are existing operations which will be expanding their production.

== Finance ==
Wesdome Gold Mines Ltd. trades on the TSX Exchange under the symbol "WDO" and has 102.0 million shares outstanding.

== Exploration ==
Wesdome reported in April 2017 it had extended the 300W Zone by 250 metres at its Eagle River mine, with highlighted intercepts including 21.2 g/t gold over 2.17 metres and 28.59 g/t gold over 2.11 metres. Surface drilling at its Mishi mine also confirmed extensions of mineralization west of the existing open pit, with intercepts including 1.95 g/t gold over 29.8 metres and 3.42 g/t gold over 7.3 metres.
