= Porcupine mine =

Gold mine in Ontario, Canada

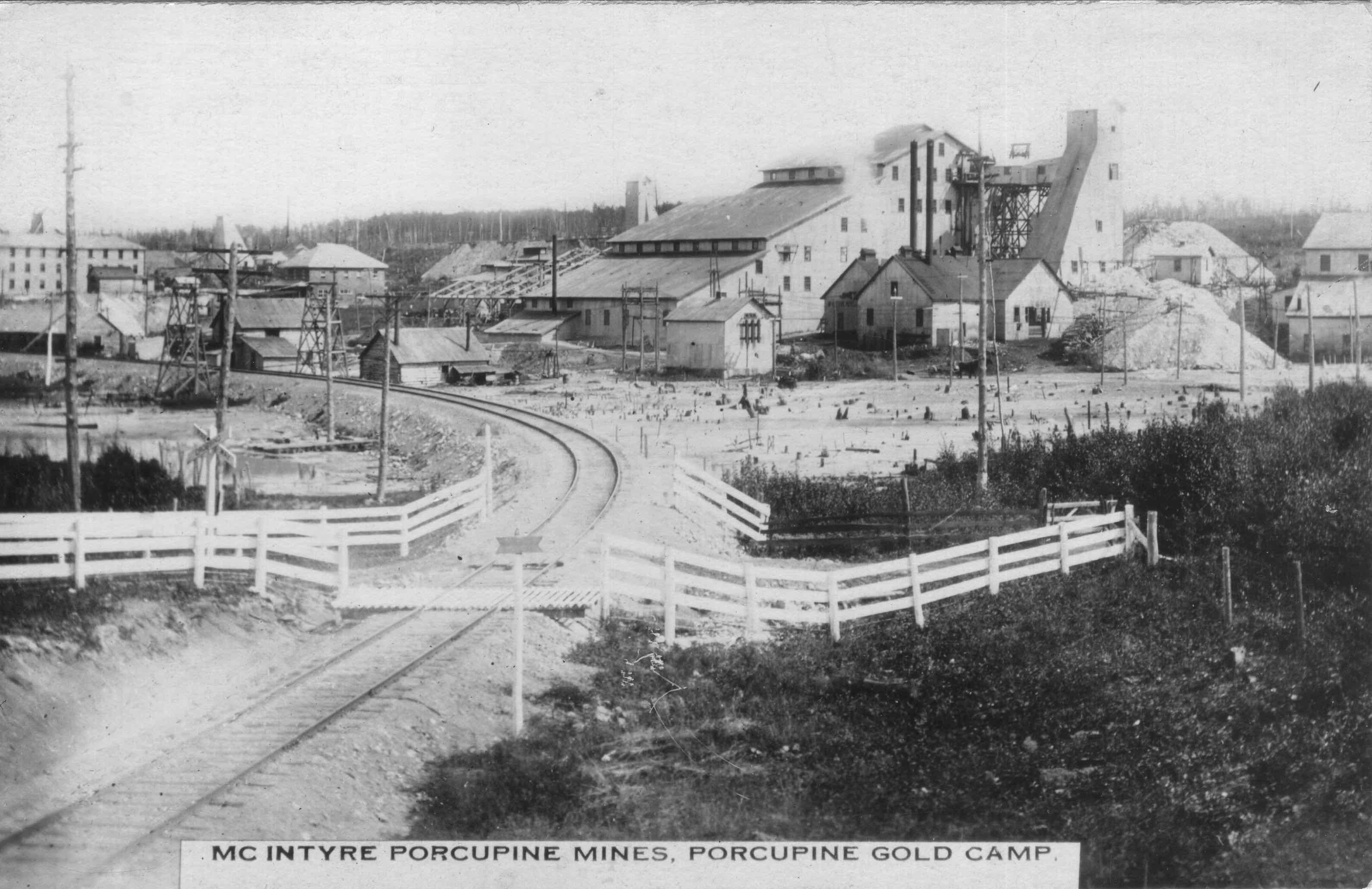
- Vintage Postcard showing operations at McIntyre Porcupine Mines

- Location in Canada
- Location: Timmins, Ontario; 48.4627°N 81.2412°W
- Products: Gold
- Company: Discovery Silver
- Website: Porcupine Operations

The Porcupine mine is one of the largest gold mines in Canada and in the world. The mine is located in Timmins, Ontario. The mine has estimated reserves of 4.35 million oz (123.32 tonnes) of gold. In January 2025, Newmont, the current owners of the mine, announced a deal to sell the mine to Discovery Silver for US$425 million. On April 16, 2025, the deal was completed.

== See also ==
- List of gold mines in Canada
