= Borden Lake mine =

Mine in Ontario, Canada

- Interactive map of Borden Lake mine
- Location: Ontario, Canada; 47.82°N 83.28°W (approx)
- Products: Gold

The Borden project located near Chapleau in Ontario, is part of Discovery Silver's Porcupine Operations. The project has the potential to further enhance the long-term economics of Porcupine. All material required permits, including the Advance Exploration permit, have been received to allow for the construction of a ramp into the deposit and the extraction of a 30,000 tonne bulk sample. The ramp design for the purpose of the bulk sample is expected to be sufficient for ultimate mining purposes. The underground platforms developed from the ramp access will further support exploration drilling of a deposit that remains open at depth and laterally. A final feasibility study is expected to occur by the end of the first quarter of 2019 after the completion of a bulk sample. With the expected ramp completion and minimal additional infrastructure required for full-scale mining, the company expects to reach commercial production six months following bulk sample extraction.
