= NORCAT =

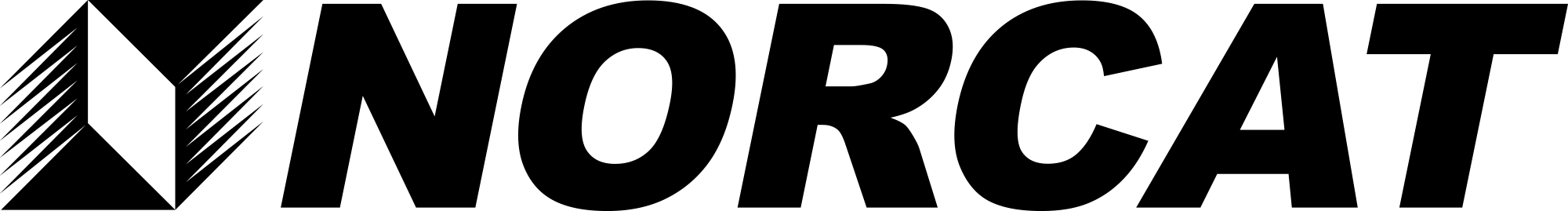

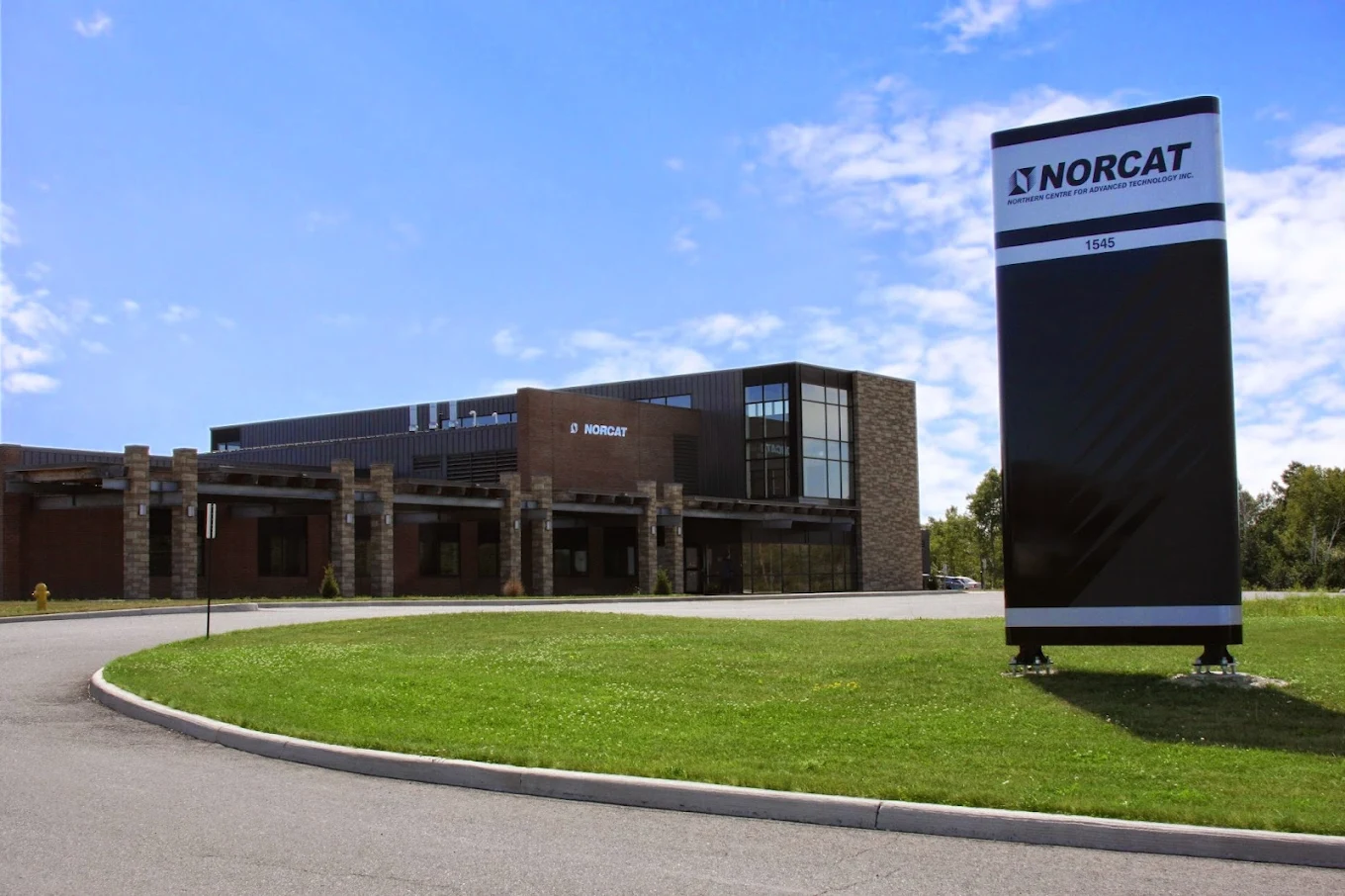
- Type: Non Profit Training and Innovation Centre
- Industry: Mining Technology
- Founded: March 28, 1995
- Founder: Darryl Lake
- Headquarters: 1545 Maley Drive, Sudbury, Ontario, Canada
- Number of locations: 6
- Area served: Sudbury Onaping Timmins GTA Thunder Bay Elko Nevada
- Services: Mine Training, Occupational Health and Safety Consultations, Mining Technology Development, Commercialization
- Website: www.norcat.org

NORCAT (known formerly as the "Northern Centre for Advanced Technology") is a not for profit technology and innovation centre headquartered in Greater Sudbury, Ontario, Canada. NORCAT provides health and safety training for the mining industry, occupational health and safety services, and product development assistance to small, medium and large industrial enterprises.

== History ==
Founding and early development (1995-2007)

NORCAT was created by Cambrian College dean Darryl Lake as part of a job-retention strategy to help employ local graduates and keep them in the Greater Sudbury area. Lake was inspired by the innovation centres in Finland, including Technopolis Oyj, and with former Cambrian College president Glenn Crombie, adapted a model to apply to Northern Ontario.

NORCAT was incorporated on March 28, 1995, operating in Cambrian College with a training centre in downtown Sudbury. In its early years, NORCAT also developed early distance-learning initiatives, including CD-based and internet-based training programs, expanding access to mining and operational health and safety training beyond traditional classroom delivery.

In 1997, NORCAT acquired the former Fecunis Adit mine in Onaping, Ontario, which later became the NORCAT Underground Centre. The facility provided a working environment for hands-on training, technology demonstrations, and mining innovation activities.

On October 23, 1998, the Honourable Chris Hodgson, Minister of Northern Development and Mines and Chair of the Northern Ontario Heritage Fund Corporation Corporation supported the opening of NORCAT's 32,000-square-foot facility, located on the Cambrian College campus. With laboratory and shop space leased at full capacity to local mine technology companies, NORCAT’s Innovation and Commercialization Centre was conceived. With donations from local mining companies and funding from the federal and provincial government, the new Innovation and Commercialization Centre opened in 2009 on the grounds of Cambrian College.

Expansion and new Headquarters (2007-2012)

In 2009, NORCAT relocated from Cambrian College and opened a brand-new 70,000 square foot facility on Maley Drive in Sudbury, which currently remains the corporate headquarters.

During this period, NORCAT expanded its innovation and commercialization activities, supporting mining technology companies through access to laboratory space, prototyping resources, and industry collaboration opportunities.

Growth and international expansion (2012-present)

In 2012, after 17 years as Chief Executive Officer, Daryl Lake announced his retirement from NORCAT. He was succeeded by Don Duval, former Vice President of Strategy and Operations at MaRS Discovery District.

During his tenure, Duval led a significant transformation of the organization, repositioning NORCAT as a global innovation hub focused on mining technology and skilled labour training. Under his leadership, NORCAT experienced more than a decade of consecutive growth, expanded from two to six locations, and extended its reach internationally, delivering projects in over 20 countries. This period also included the expansion of the NORCAT Underground Centre as a state-of-the-art training facility and a global testing and demonstration site for emerging mining technologies.

During this period, NORCAT also expanded its training model through the use of augmented and virtual reality technologies. Studio NORCAT, established in 2013, supported the development of immersive learning tools and digital training content for mining and industrial applications.

NORCAT expanded its regional presence during this period with new locations in Timmins (2014), Thunder Bay (2017), and the Greater Toronto Area (2019), extending access to training and innovation services across Ontario.

This period also included the expansion of the NORCAT Underground Centre as a state-of-the-art training facility and a global testing and demonstration site for emerging mining technologies.

In 2024, NORCAT expanded into the United States through the establishment of operations in Elko, Nevada, through a partnership with Great Basin College and support from the Nevada Governor's Office of Economic Development (GOED). The initiative focuses on mining workforce development, training, and advisory services for Nevada's mining sector.

In 2025, NORCAT announced that Don Duval would step down as Chief Executive Officer after 13 years in the role. He was succeeded by Pejman Salehi, who assumed the position in March 2026. Salehi’s appointment marked the next phase of leadership for NORCAT as it continued to expand its role in mining innovation and workforce development.

Today, NORCAT’s headquarters is a hub for innovation and workforce development, providing flexible office space for startups and small to medium-sized enterprises, access to prototyping facilities, and specialized advisory resources to support the development of new technologies and ventures.

NORCAT's Advisory Services division provides consulting and occupational health and safety support to mining and industrial organizations, including risk assessments, safety management systems, regulatory compliance support, and workplace health monitoring. These services have supported clients across North America and internationally through partnerships and industry projects.

In addition to its Sudbury headquarters, NORCAT has expanded to multiple locations across Ontario and into the United States, including Nevada, supporting a range of departments focused on innovation, training, and economic development.

== Services ==
NORCAT offers a number of services to support the different objectives of the centre. To support the technology development, occupational health and safety services and specialized mine training programs provide financial solvency for the centre.

=== Specialized mine training ===
The centre provides health and safety training programs to mining companies, contractors and other organizations, including Common Core training, Contractor Orientation and Workplace Hazardous Materials Information System training. These programs are delivered at the centre, at their Underground Mine Centre and online through blended eLearning programs that incorporate virtual and augmented reality technologies to supplement classroom and practical instruction.

=== The NORCAT Underground Centre ===
NORCAT provides access to one of the few training mines in North America. The Underground Centre was opened in November 1997, in the Falconbridge (Glencore) owned Fecunis Adit mine in Onaping, Ontario. The mine provides practical mine training, testing space for mine technology prototypes, and an underground setting for photographing and filming mine technology in a controlled underground setting.

The facility also is a technology testing and demonstration site where mining companies, equipment manufactures, and research organizations evaluate new equipment and systems under operating mine conditions.

In 2015 NORCAT made major investments in the Underground Centre, partnering with local and international mining supply companies to showcase their products, as well as upgrading their facilities to include new dries and meeting rooms for rent.

Construction of a new, 12,000 square foot surface facility was completed in 2021.

The Underground Centre is also home to Mining Transformed, a biennial mining technology exhibition launched in 2022 that showcases emerging technologies in an operating underground mine environment.

=== Occupational health and safety services ===
NORCAT’s Health and Safety Resource Centre offers consulting services and training programs. The centre provides expertise in issues ranging from toxicology, confined space awareness, handling dangerous goods and personal protection equipment. NORCAT also provides monitoring for airborne chemical hazards, indoor environmental quality assessment and monitoring of molds and bioaerosols for schools, offices, homes, and industrial workplaces.

The Advisory division also supports mining companies and other industrial organizations through health and safety management systems, regulatory compliance, operational risk assessments, and workforce development initiatives. NORCAT has delivered advisory projects for clients across Canada and internationally through partnerships with industry, government, and mining organizations.

=== Innovation and commercialization (NORCAT Innovation) ===
NORCAT assists small and medium enterprises with their development by providing access to laboratories, office space and specific expertise. This allows SMEs to build and develop their products without extensive overhead and operational constraints. The centre is a member of the Ontario Network of Entrepreneurs, a collaboration of organizations designed to help commercialize products and services with educational programs, advisory services, and financing.

In 2014, the regional innovation centre was rebranded as the “NORCAT Innovation Mill”, which continued to offer support to SMEs through the Ontario Network of Entrepreneurs. The Innovation Mill also hosts the Sudbury wing of the Entrepreneurship 101 business fundamentals course (developed by the MaRS Discovery District) as well as several business-pitch events for start-up companies to gain exposure to angel investors.

In 2018, the "NORCAT Innovation Mill" was rebranded as NORCAT Innovation.

Studio NORCAT supports the organization's workforce development activities by producing digital learning resources, multimedia content, and immersive training experiences using virtual reality (VR), augmented reality (AR), and mixed reality (XR) technologies for mining and industrial applications.
