= Dräger (company) =

German manufacturer of breathing equipment

Drägerwerk AG & Co. KGaA
- Company type: Kommanditgesellschaft auf Aktien with Aktiengesellschaft as partner with unlimited liability
- Traded as: FWB: DRW3
- Industry: Engineering, medical technology, security technology
- Founded: 1889
- Founder: J. Heinrich Dräger; Carl Adolf Gerling
- Headquarters: Lübeck, Germany
- Key people: Stefan Dräger, chairman of the executive board; Gert-Hartwig Lescow; Rainer Klug; Reiner Piske; Anton Schrofner; Stefanie Hirsch; Maria Dietz, Chairman of the Supervisory Board
- Services: Diving equipment, rebreathers, SCBA, medical ventilators and monitors, anaesthetic machines, neonatal incubators, gas detectors, breathalyzers, drug testing equipment
- Revenue: ▼€3.37 billion (2024)
- Net income: ▲€124.8 million (2024)
- Total assets: ▼€3.09 billion (2024)
- Total equity: ▲€1.54 billion (2024)
- Number of employees: ▲16,598 (2024)
- Website: www.draeger.com

Drägerwerk AG & Co. KGaA, commonly known as Dräger, is a publicly listed company based in Lübeck, Germany. It develops, manufactures, and sells devices and systems in the fields of medical and safety technology.

Rescue workers in the North American mining industry are often referred to as a Drägerman due to Dräger’s respiratory protection equipment.

== History ==
=== Founding and early years ===
The company was founded in Lübeck in 1889 as Dräger & Gerling by J. Heinrich Dräger and Carl Adolf Gerling. In the same year, the Lubeca valve, a pressure reducer, was patented. In 1899, Dräger introduced a pressure gauge for breathing gas cylinders, which is still referred to today as a finimeter. In 1902, Dräger developed the Roth-Dräger anaesthesia apparatus, named after Lübeck doctor Otto Roth, which was used in Germany until the end of World War II. Early developments also included the Dräger BG 1904/09, a helmet breathing device used in mines rescue operations.

In 1907, Dräger developed a diving rescue device for submarine crews and the emergency ventilator Pulmotor, and the company opened its first branch in the United States in the same year. In 1912, Heinrich Dräger's son, Bernhard Dräger, became the sole owner of the company. From this point on, the company was known as Drägerwerk Heinr. und Bernh. Dräger (also: Drägerwerk Lübeck. Heinr. & Bernh. Dräger).

In 1937, Dräger developed the first so-called Dräger tube, a test tube for the early measurement of carbon monoxide in the air. This system improved safety in mining by replacing the traditional use of canaries, which had previously served as early warning indicators due to their sensitivity to even small amounts of toxic gases.

=== World War II ===
During the Third Reich, forced labourers were employed at Dräger. In 1941, approximately 1,200 forced labourers were employed. In June 1944, nearly 500 women were transported from the Ravensbrück concentration camp to Dräger’s facilities in Hamburg-Wandsbek for forced labour. Until April 1945, they lived in the Hamburg-Wandsbek subcamp of the Neuengamme concentration camp in barracks on the factory grounds. They were employed in the production of gas masks and in clearing debris after bombings in Hamburg. Some of the prisoners were subjected to human experiments on survival in gas-tight air-raid shelters. Approximately 550 women were liberated in May 1945 by British soldiers and the Swedish Red Cross.

In 2010, a memorial site was opened next to the former Hamburg-Wandsbek camp, and a memorial was erected for the forced labourers. In 2022, the Initiative Stolpersteine placed five Stolpersteine in front of Dräger in Lübeck. Dräger sponsored these memorial stones, which are dedicated to five executed forced labourers and the camp inhabitants of former factories in Siems, Herrenwyk, Schlutup, and other businesses that employed forced labour during the Nazi period.

=== Product expansion and growth ===
In 1953, Dräger introduced the first alcohol test tubes, which were continuously improved and later adopted worldwide by police forces and companies. In 1998, results from measurements taken by officially approved devices became valid in court. In total, more than 30 million test tubes were produced before being replaced by electronic measuring devices, with production ending in 2016.

In 1970, Dräger became a public limited company, and its initial public offering (IPO) followed in 1979. In 1984, Heinrich Dräger's son, Christian Dräger, succeeded him as CEO after having worked at Dräger since 1961. In 2003, the aerospace division was sold to Cobham plc., and in 2004, Dräger acquired Air-Shields.

In the 1990s, Dräger developed an alcohol interlock device that could be installed in vehicles. These devices are linked to the vehicle’s ignition system and can only be started after a breath sample is provided. If alcohol is detected in the breath, the vehicle will not start. The interlock devices are primarily used in Australia, France, and the Scandinavian countries. In the following years, Dräger developed additional interlock devices.

In July 2005, Stefan Dräger became CEO of the company, representing the fifth generation in the role. In 2010, the company’s common shares were traded on the Frankfurt Stock Exchange for the first time. Previously, only non-voting preferred shares had been offered.

In the following years, Dräger acquired several start-ups. In 2015, Dräger acquired the Norwegian start-up Gassecure, which manufactures gas sensors for hydrocarbons, among other applications. The acquisition expanded the safety technology division, particularly to serve the oil, gas, and chemical industries. In 2017, Dräger took a majority stake in the Hamburg-based company Bentekk GmbH, which is active in the development of industrial gas detection devices.

=== COVID-19 pandemic ===
Due to the COVID-19 pandemic, demand for Dräger's ventilators increased significantly. In February 2020, the production capacity was doubled and was set to be doubled again by March 2020. The German federal government commissioned 10,000 devices, which were scheduled for delivery throughout 2020. Ultimately, only 1,557 devices were delivered, while the remaining orders were canceled. A significant portion of the production was sold abroad. Additionally, the production of respiratory masks was doubled. According to an article in The New York Times, Xavier Becerra (who was selected by then-President-elect Joseph R. Biden Jr. as his nominee for the Secretary of Health and Human Services in the US), stated that he planned to order approximately 1 million medical ventilators to manage the COVID-19 epidemic upon taking office. In this statement, he named Dräger as one of the potential suppliers.

In 2020, revenue increased by 22.5% to €3.4 billion. By the end of 2021, demand for COVID-19-related products declined, and production of Dräger’s COVID-19 home tests was discontinued.

=== Recent developments ===
In 2022, an increase in disruptions to the supply chain led to a temporary decline in Dräger's revenue. In 2023, the supply chains stabilised, and with growing demand from China, revenue began to rise again.

Following the Russian invasion of Ukraine and the subsequent sanctions, Dräger ceased its safety technology business in Russia. In October 2024, Rems Messtechnik GmbH & Co KG acquired Dräger MSI GmbH, which had been responsible for measurement technology within Dräger.

== Company structure ==
Drägerwerk AG & Co. KGaA acts as the holding company of the Dräger Group. Dräger products are sold in over 190 countries across all continents, and the company operates its own sales and service subsidiaries in approximately 50 countries. Additionally, Dräger has a total of 20 development and manufacturing sites. The company's headquarters is located in Lübeck. In 2024, Dräger invested approximately €333.1 million in research and development.

=== Capital structure and shareholders ===
Drägerwerk was a public limited company (AG) until 2007, after which it became a limited partnership with shares (AG & Co. KGaA). As of 2025, 71.62% of the common shares are held by the Dräger family, mainly through the Dr. Heinrich Dräger GmbH.

The family has been continuously involved in the company's leadership through the positions of CEO and Chairman of the Supervisory Board:

- Johann Heinrich Dräger (1847–1917), founder of the company and CEO from 1887 to 1912.
- Bernhard Dräger (1870–1928), CEO from 1912 to 1928.
- Heinrich Dräger (1898–1986), CEO from 1928 to 1984.
- Christian Dräger (1934–2024), CEO from 1984 to 1997.
- Theo Dräger (1938–2025), CEO from 1997 to 2005.
- Stefan Dräger (born 1963), CEO since 2005.

== Divisions and products ==
=== Medical technology ===
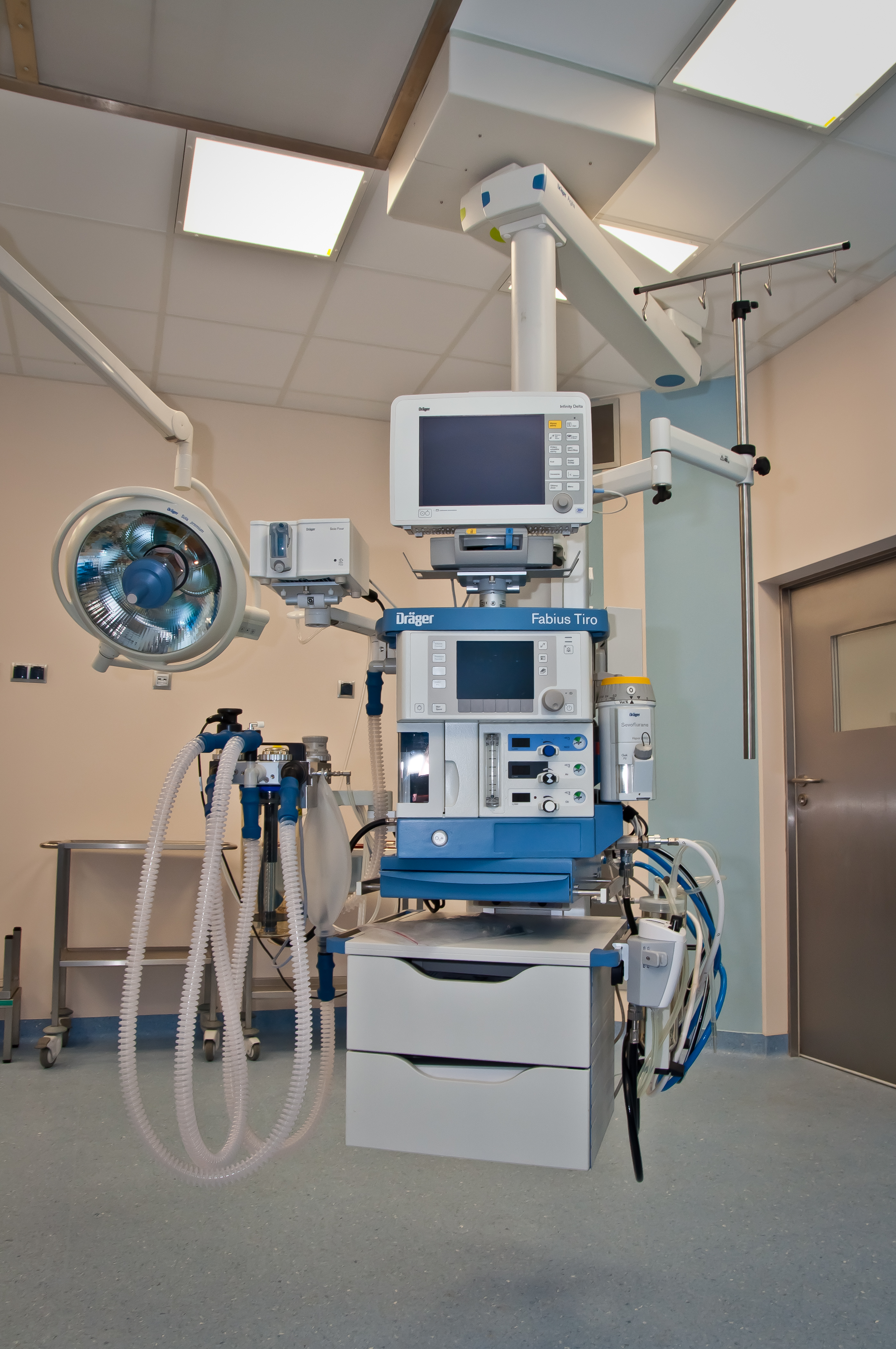
Dräger Fabius Tiro Anaesthetic machine

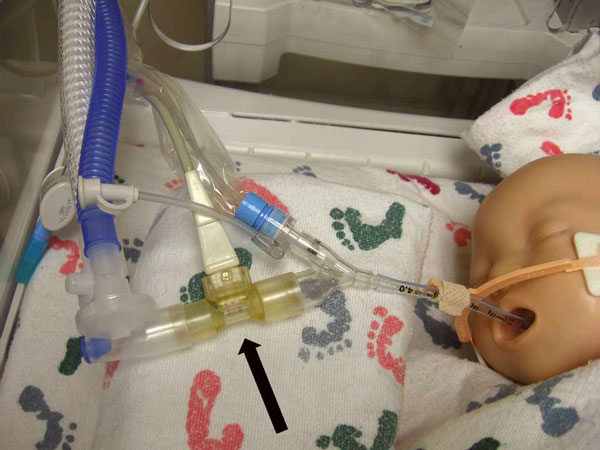
Dräger Evita v500 respirator. Arrow indicates Neoflow air flow sensor

In its medical technology division, Dräger develops and manufactures systems, devices, and services that work together in acute care medicine. Before merging with the parent company in 2015, the medical technology division operated independently under the names Dräger Medical AG & Co. KG and later as Dräger Medical GmbH. Since 2003, Drägerwerk AG held a joint venture in medical technology with Siemens AG, in which Dräger held a 75% stake and Siemens 25%. In 2009, Drägerwerk AG & Co. KGaA repurchased Siemens AG’s 25% minority stake. In 2024, the division generated revenue of €1.9 billion.

Dräger’s medical technology products include anaesthesia workstations, ventilators for intensive and emergency care, patient monitoring systems, and equipment for neonatal and preterm infant care in perinatal medicine. In 1975, Dräger introduced the Babylog ventilator for premature infants. During the 1980s, Dräger also introduced a device maintenance centre (GPZ) with separate clean and unclean sections, similar to earlier disinfection facilities. Other hospital systems include ceiling supply units, IT systems for operating theatres, and gas management systems. In 1985, Dräger introduced the Evita series, incorporating advanced screen and computer technology to improve the integration of mechanical ventilation with spontaneous breathing.

The company also developed the Babyroo warming unit, designed to support neonatal postnatal care. This system features an integrated resuscitation function that automatically regulates ventilation parameters, including oxygen concentration and Positive End-Expiratory Pressure (PEEP).

Dräger also provides various services, including manufacturer-independent maintenance, repair, and management of medical devices. Additionally, the company offers financing models for hospital equipment fleets.

=== Safety technology ===
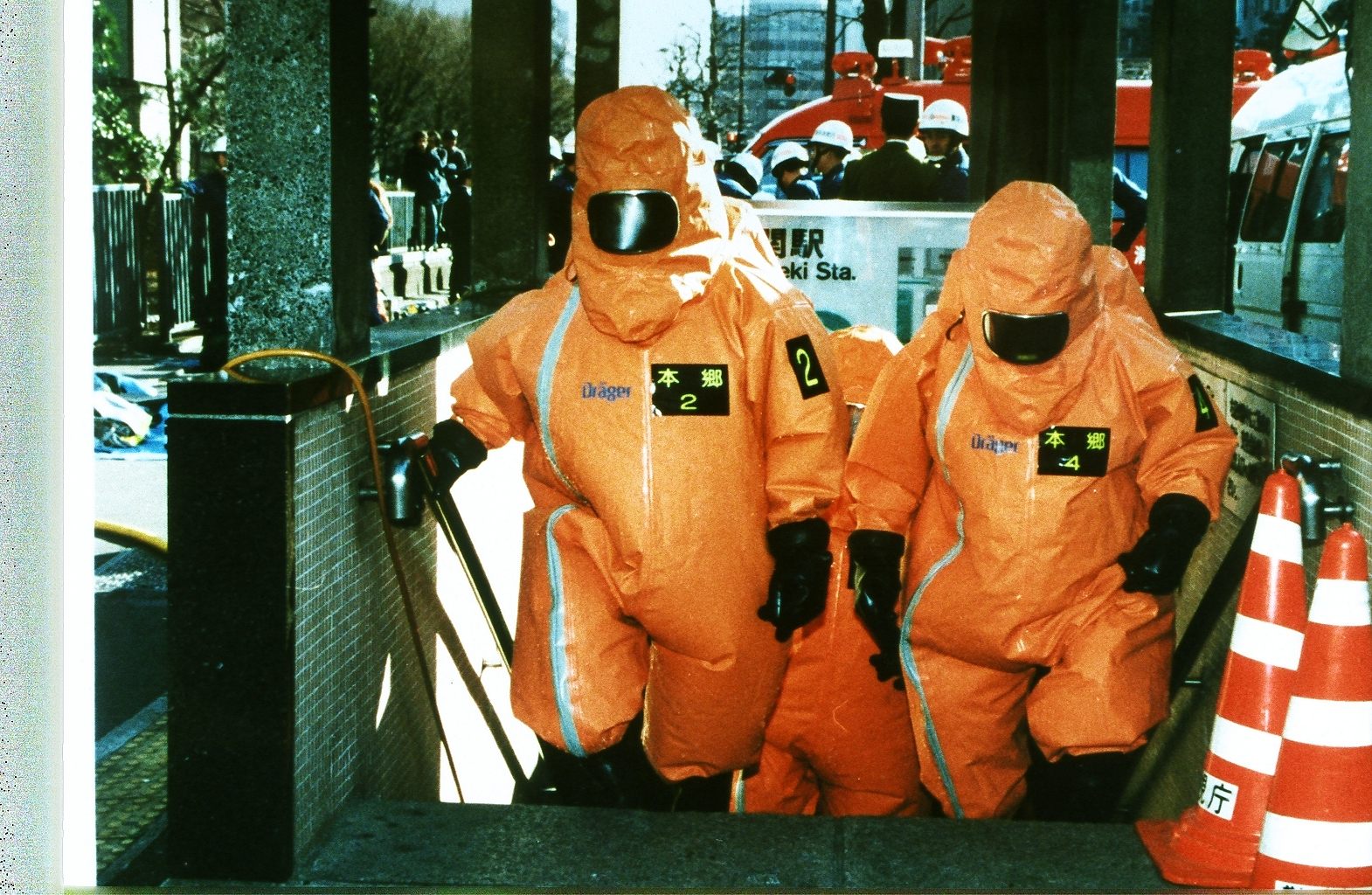
HAZMAT crews of the Tokyo Fire Department, wearing Dräger protective equipment, responded to the Tokyo subway sarin attack.

In its safety technology division, Dräger develops and manufactures equipment, systems, and services for personal protection, gas detection, and comprehensive hazard management. In 2024, the safety technology division generated revenue of €1.47 billion. Dräger operates production sites in Germany, the United Kingdom, the Czech Republic, the United States, Sweden, South Africa, and China.

The target markets include industries such as resource extraction, the chemical industry, the oil and gas sector, as well as fire and rescue services. Dräger’s safety technology product range includes respiratory protection equipment, stationary and portable gas detection systems, professional diving technology, and alcohol and drug testing devices. Additionally, the company collaborates with customers to develop comprehensive fire training facilities, training programmes, and educational concepts.

Dräger's products include powered air-purifying respirators, such as the Dräger X-plore 8700. In the field of gas detection, the company offers devices like the Dräger X-am 8000 multi-gas detector, capable of measuring oxygen levels as well as toxic or flammable gases and vapours. For mining and firefighting applications, Dräger provides the Dräger BG ProAir, a self-contained breathing apparatus designed for prolonged operations. The company also supplies the Dräger UCF FireCore thermal imaging camera for fire and rescue services.

Dräger was one of the first companies developing colorimetric gas detector tubes (also known as "detector tubes"), which are used to measure gas concentrations. In a typical colorimetric gas detector tube, a known volume of air is drawn through a tube using a pump. The tube typically contains a reactive layer that changes colour depending on the concentration of the gas passing through the tube. The length of the colour change zone varies accordingly.

Dräger also manufactured the high-altitude oxygen sets used in the 1952 Swiss Mount Everest expedition (the second, autumn expedition), and John Hunt later had adaptors made so that the 1953 British expedition could use oxygen from tanks left behind by the Swiss, particularly for their bottled oxygen "sleeping sets".

== Diving equipment ==
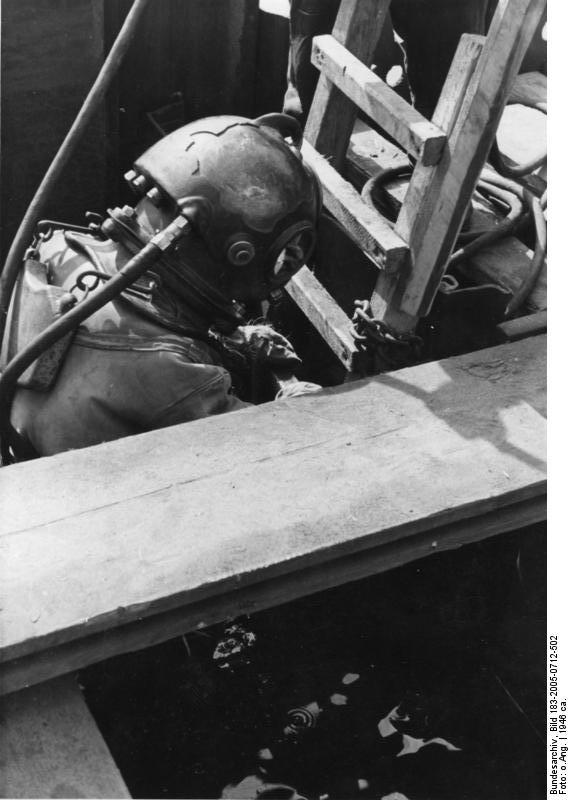
Dräger three-bolt bubikopf helmet in use for surface supplied diving

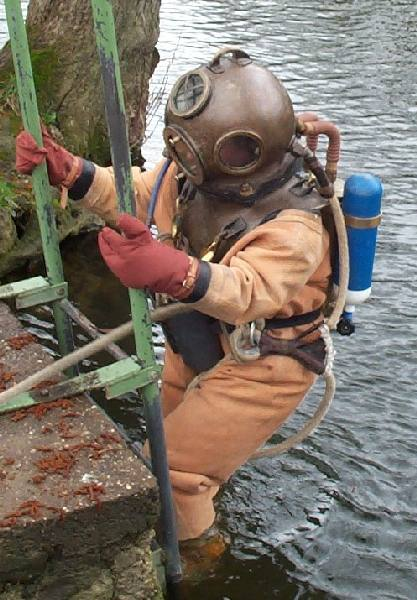
Helmeted diver entering the water. He has a back mounted Dräger DM40 rebreather system in addition to the surface supply air hose

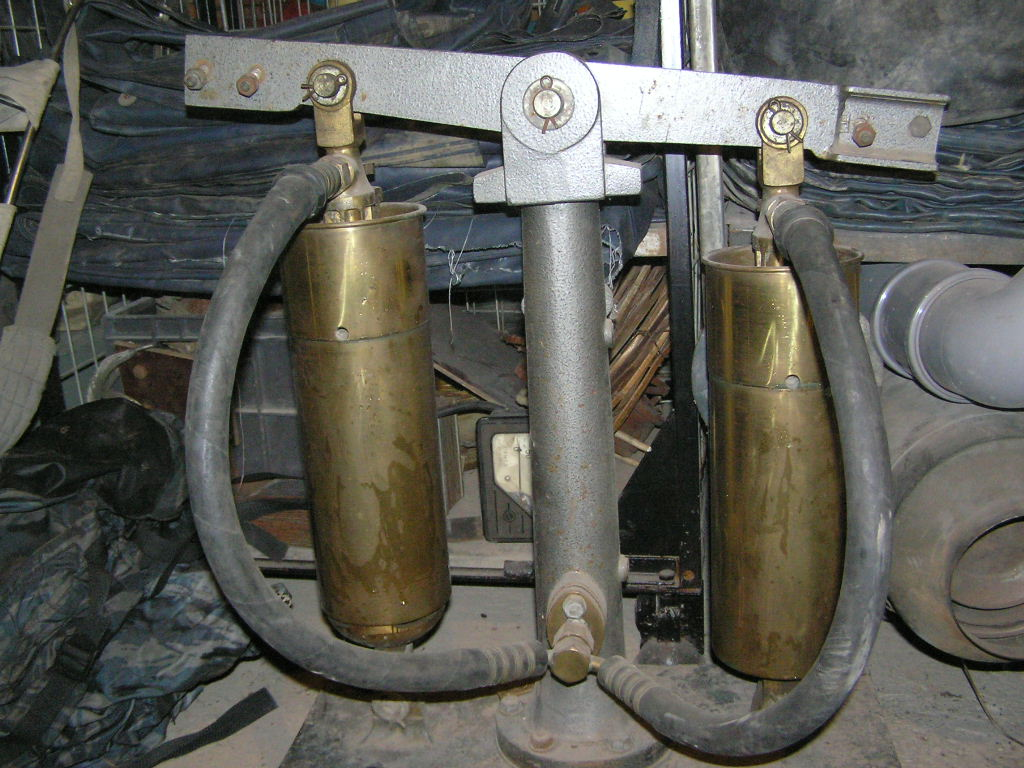
Two cylinders hand pump (presented on picture without handles) made for divers in standard diving dress by Drägerwerk AG

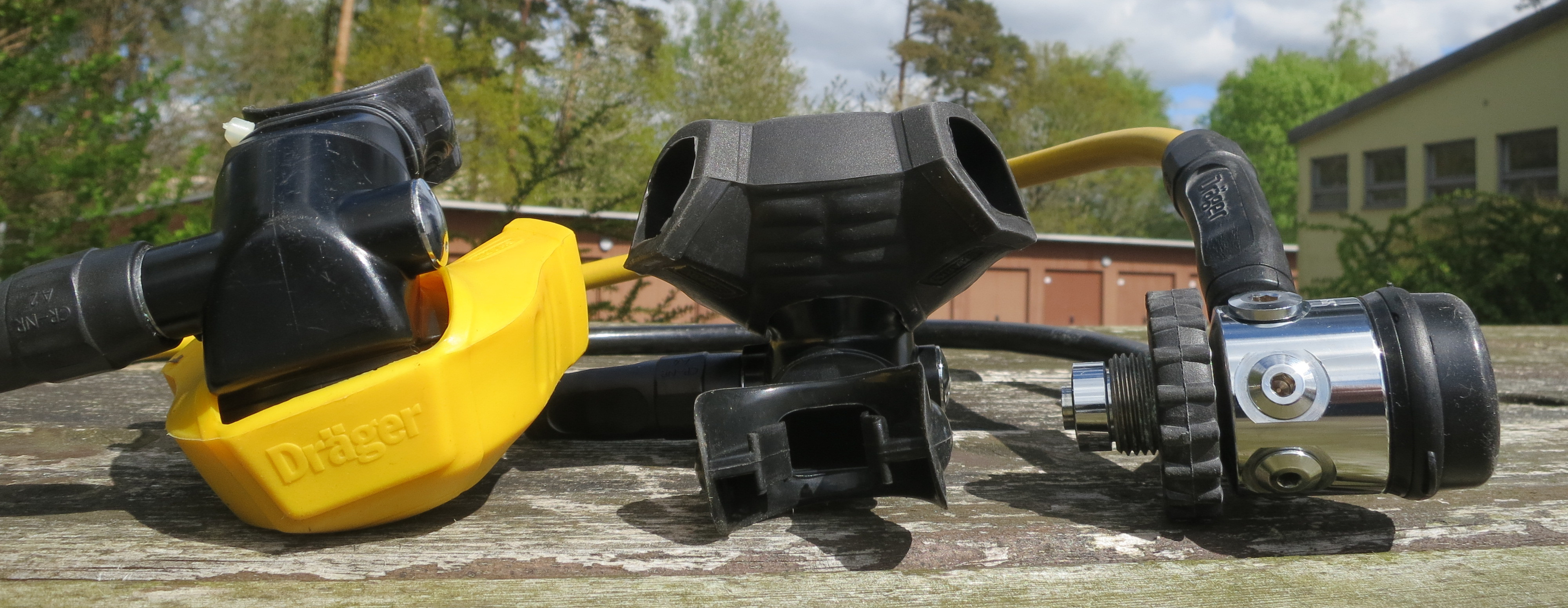
Dräger's "Shark" diving regulator from the 1990s

=== Standard diving helmets and other equipment ===
Drägerwerk manufactured heavy diving equipment in the early 20th century, including helmets and diver's air pumps.

=== Standard diving dress rebreathers ===
In 1912, Drägerwerk developed standard diving dress which did not require surface-supplied breathing gas via a diver's umbilical, as it utilized a self-contained gas supply from a rebreather. The system featured a copper diving helmet and a standard heavy diving suit with a back-mounted set of cylinders and scrubber. Two versions were available: the DM20, designed for oxygen use at depths of up to 20 metres, and the DM40, designed for nitrox use at depths of up to 40 metres. The DM40 system used both an oxygen cylinder and an air cylinder, mixing the gases as needed. The semi-closed breathing circuit used the injected gas to circulate the gas in the helmet through a scrubber, providing a significantly lower work of breathing in comparison with most other rebreathers which used the lungs of the diver to circulate gas in the loop. The Modell 1915 bubikopf helmet was designed for use with this system. The rebreather loop hoses connected to the back of the helmet below the overhanging part, and led from there to the back-mounted scrubber.

=== SCBA and SCUBA rebreathers ===
Since 1941, Hans Hass used bag-on-back rebreathers for scuba diving, originally built by Dräger for self-rescue of submarine crews (Tauchretter; like the Davis Escape Set). The first Dräger-Tauchretter had been built in 1907. In 1926 the Bade-Tauchretter was brought into service for rescuing drowning swimmers.

Dräger manufactured the Atlantis, Ray, and Dolphin lines of recreational diving semi-closed-circuit nitrox rebreathers. The company also manufactures the LAR-5 and LAR-6 military oxygen rebreathers, and the LAV-7 military rebreather which can be switched between closed-circuit and semi-closed-circuit modes.

=== Atlantis/Dolphin ===
The Dräger Dolphin, originally Atlantis is a semi-closed circuit nitrox rebreather for recreational diving using a constant mass flow injection system.

=== Ray ===
The Dräger Ray is a semi-closed circuit recreational diving rebreather designed to use standard nitrox breathing gas mixtures.

==== Construction ====
===== Harness and assembly =====
The soft harness has integrated over-the-shoulder counterlungs and buoyancy compensator bladder. The harness also carries a moderately sized scrubber canister on the upper back, and a single, transversely mounted cylinder on the lower back. The Ray delivers a constant mass flow of gas to the breathing circuit through a Dräger Shark regulator and a metering orifice which is chosen from a small range and must be matched to the chosen gas mixture.

The whole unit excepting cylinders is supplied in a carrying case.

===== Breathing loop =====
The standard unit includes a simple dive/surface valve (DSV) with a mouthpiece, but an optional DSV can be connected to the Dräger Panorama full-face mask using the standard Dräger P-port connection system, which is also used for the connections between the breathing hoses and counterlungs, as well as between the counterlungs and scrubber canister. The back-mounted scrubber has axial flow and features an auxiliary P-port on the base, which can be used to connect an optional oxygen monitor cell.

The automatic diluent valve and metering orifice are combined into a single unit that plugs into a counterlung using a standard P-port connection.

===== Gas supply =====
The standard cylinder supplied with the unit is a 4-litre, 200 bar steel cylinder, but the unit can also accommodate an 8-litre steel cylinder, which is about the same length but has a larger diameter. The standard open circuit bailout uses a Shark demand valve on the same first stage that is used for the metering and ADV. A low-pressure hose is also included to supply the buoyancy compensator.

==== Specifications ====
Recreational semi-closed circuit rebreather with constant mass flow dosage and demand gas supply, open circuit bailout on independent second stage.

- Year of design: 2000
- Scrubber capacity: approximately 1,25 kg
- Width: 450 mm
- Height: 600 mm
- Weight: approximately 15 kg
- Gas supply cylinder: 4 litre, 200 bar (standard)
- Diving depth:
  - 6 msw (100% oxygen)
  - 22 msw (EAN 50)
  - 30 msw (EAN 40)
  - 40 msw (EAN 32)
- Dive duration: approximately 70 minutes (EAN 50)
- Gas mixes: EAN 32, EAN 40, EAN 50, 100% Oxygen (require dedicated components – fixed orifice in ADV valve block)
- Flow rate (approximate):
  - EAN 40: 12 litre/minute
  - EAN 50: 8.25 litre/minute

== Sponsoring ==
Dräger supports Volunteer fire departments, the German Firefighting Museum in Fulda and, since 2019, the Made by Diversity campaign, which is committed to greater tolerance and openness in society.

== Awards (selection) ==
- 2019: Corporate Health Award, awarded by the research institute EuPD Research and Handelsblatt.
- 2021: Excellence in eSolutions Award, awarded by the German Association for Materials Management, Purchasing, and Logistics (BME).

Additionally, Dräger has been recognised with over 33 iF Design Awards. Dräger has also been repeatedly awarded by Wirtschaftswoche as the most valuable employer for the common good (Gemeinwohl) in Germany.

== Literature ==
- Haase-Lampe, W. (1917). Bei Drägers. Erinnerungen [At Dräger’s. Memories]. Die Heimat, 27(2), 26–32.
- Damals. Dräger Mitarbeiter erinnern sich [Back Then. Dräger Employees Remember]. Drägerwerk AG, Lübeck. 1989.
- Romey, S. (1994). Ein KZ in Wandsbek. Zwangsarbeit im Hamburger Drägerwerk [A Concentration Camp in Wandsbek. Forced Labour at the Hamburg Drägerwerk]. VSA-Verlag, Hamburg. ISBN 978-3-87975-613-1
- Lorenz, B. (2001). Industrieelite und Wirtschaftspolitik 1928–1950. Heinrich Dräger und das Drägerwerk [Industrial Elite and Economic Policy 1928–1950. Heinrich Dräger and the Drägerwerk]. Schöningh Verlag, Berlin. ISBN 978-3-506-75255-0
- Dräger, J. H. (2003). Welt im Wandel. Lebenserinnerungen [World in Transition. Memoirs]. Leibniz Verlag, St. Goar. (First edition: 1913). ISBN 978-3-931155-01-8
- Thoemmes, M. (2009). Heinrich Dräger. In A. Bruns (Ed.), Neue Lübecker Lebensläufe [New Lübeck Biographies] (pp. 175–182). Wachholtz Verlag, Neumünster. ISBN 978-3-529-01338-6
- Böttcher, W., & Thoemmes, M. (2011). Heinrich Dräger. Eine Biographie [Heinrich Dräger. A Biography]. Wachholtz Verlag, Neumünster. ISBN 978-3-529-06123-3
- Bahns, E. (2014). Mit dem Pulmotor fing es an. Die Geschichte der maschinellen Beatmung [It All Started with the Pulmotor. The History of Mechanical Ventilation]. Drägerwerk, Lübeck.
- Kamp, M. (2017). Bernhard Dräger: Erfinder, Unternehmer, Bürger. 1870 bis 1928 [Bernhard Dräger: Inventor, Entrepreneur, Citizen. 1870–1928]. Wachholtz Verlag, Kiel/Hamburg. ISBN 978-3-529-06369-5

== See also ==
- Breathing gas – Gas used for human respiration
- Rebreather – Portable apparatus to recycle breathing gas
- Rebreather diving – Underwater diving using self contained breathing gas recycling apparatus
