= Drägerman =

A Drägerman or Drägerwoman, also spelled Draegerman or Draegerwoman, is a common name for a rescue worker in mines.

The name originates from Alexander Bernhard Dräger, a German scientist who invented the combination of a gas mask and an oxygen inhalator as a breathing apparatus for underground rescue workers.

In 1937, Warner Bros. released the film Draegerman Courage about Drägerman rescuing people trapped in a mine.

== See also ==
- Ontario Mine Rescue
