= Dome Mines =

Canadian mining company (1910–1987)

Dome Mines Limited
- Formerly: Dome Mines Company
- Industry: Mining
- Founded: 23 March 1910
- Defunct: 13 August 1987
- Fate: Merged with Placer Development
- Successor: Placer Dome
- Headquarters: Toronto, Ontario

Dome Mines Limited was a Canadian mining company that existed from 1910 to 1987. It has been the largest gold producer in Canada and in North America.

The company was formed to operate the Dome Mine in Timmins, Ontario, and expanded to operate mines in Ontario and Quebec. Subsidiary Dome Petroleum was formed in 1950. The company was merged into Placer Dome in 1987, which in turn was acquired by Barrick Gold in 2006.

== History ==
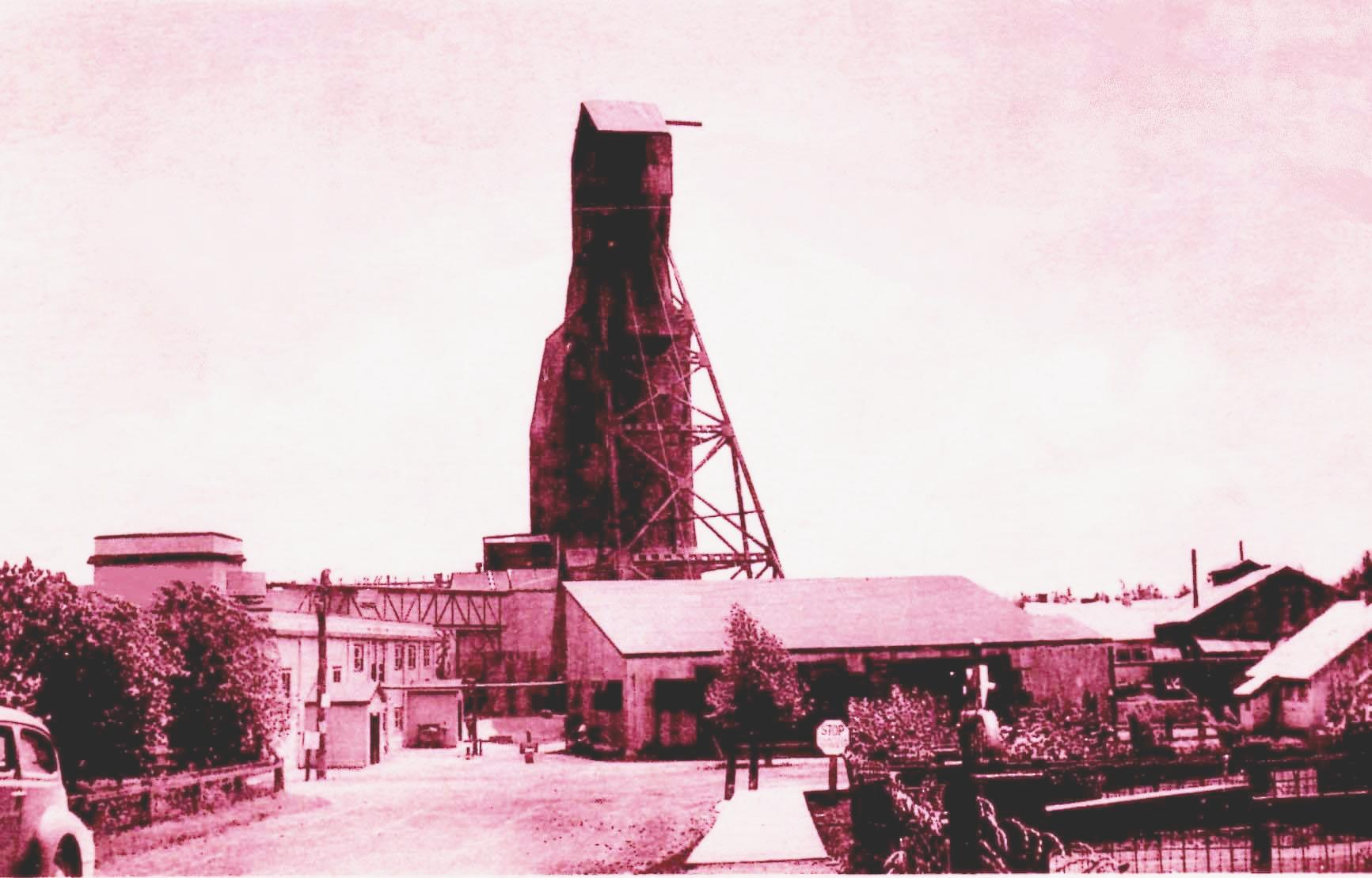
Dome mine 1938

Headquartered in Toronto, Dome was established in 1910 to operate the Dome Mine in Timmins, Ontario after a major discovery by a group working for W. S. Edwards in May 1909. The company later became Canada's largest gold producer.

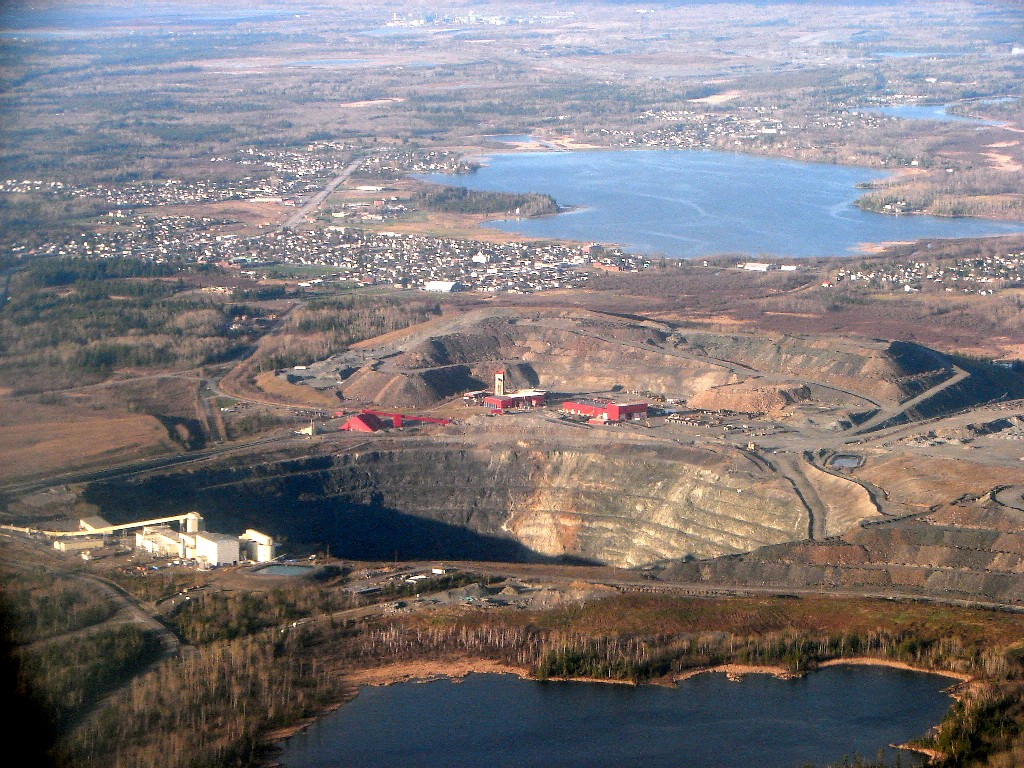
Dome Mine, 2010

For most of its existence, Dome Mines was Canada's largest gold producer.

Workers for subsidiary Dome Exploration, discovered the ore that became the Campbell Mine in Balmertown in 1944. Dome Exploration then became Campbell Red Lake Mines Limited. Other subsidiaries were Kiena Gold Mines Limited and Sigma Mines in Quebec.

The company entered the petroleum industry in 1950 with the creation of Dome Petroleum.

In 1987, under the leadership of Fraser M. Fell, Dome merged with the Vancouver mining company Placer Development to form Placer Dome. The new merged entity became the largest mining company in North America.

In 2006 Barrick Gold acquired Placer Dome.

== Leadership ==
=== President ===
1. John F. H. McCarthy, 1910
2. William S. Edwards, 1911
3. Ambrose Monell, 1912–1914
4. Joseph Raphael de la Mar, 1915–1918
5. Jules Semon Bache, 1919–1942
6. Clifford William Michel, 1943–1958
7. James Botterell Redpath, 1959–1977
8. Malcolm Auguste Taschereau, 1978–1983
9. Charles Henry Brehaut, 1983–1987

=== Chairman of the Board ===
1. Jules Semon Bache, 1943–1944
2. Clifford William Michel, 1959–1976
3. Maj-Gen Albert Bruce Matthews, 1976–1983
4. Fraser Matthews Fell, 1983–1987
