= Alexander Bernhard Dräger =

German engineer, industrialist and inventor

- Born: 14 June 1870; Howe, Hamburg
- Died: 12 January 1928 (aged 57); Lübeck
- Occupations: Engineer, industrialist and inventor

Alexander Bernhard Dräger (14 June 1870, Howe - 12 January 1928, Lübeck), was a German engineer, industrialist and inventor.

Dräger was born in the village of Howe (now part of Kirchwerder, Bergedorf, Hamburg. In 1889, Bernhard's father Johann Heinrich Dräger and Carl Adolf Gerling founded Firma Dräger und Gerling in Lübeck to exploit industrial gas technology. In 1902, Heinrich took Bernhard into partnership, and the firm's name was changed to Drägerwerk Heinr. und Bernh. Dräger. The firm specialised in self-contained breathing sets for industrial and rescue workers and for divers, and welding and cutting torches. The company still exists today, as Drägerwerk AG.

Bernhard filed at least one patent application for his developments.
