= Goldcorp =

Canadian mining company

Goldcorp Inc.
- Type: Subsidiary
- Traded as: TSX: NGT
- Industry: Gold Mining
- Founded: 1994; 32 years ago
- Founder: Rob McEwen
- Headquarters: Vancouver, British Columbia, Canada
- Key people: Ian Telfer (chairman); David Garofalo (president and CEO)
- Products: Gold
- Revenue: ▼$3,510.00 million (2016)
- Operating income: ▲$369.00 million (2016)
- Net income: ▲$162.00 million (2016)
- Total assets: ▲$21.5 billion (2016)
- Number of employees: 15,800 (2015)
- Parent: Newmont Mining Corporation
- Website: goldcorp.com

Goldcorp Inc. was a gold production company headquartered in Vancouver, British Columbia, Canada. The company stood among the largest gold producers in the world, employed about 15,800 people worldwide, engaged in gold mining and related activities including exploration, extraction, processing and reclamation. Goldcorp’s operating assets included eleven mines in North and South America.

In 2019, Goldcorp merged with Newmont Mining Corporation, the world’s second-largest producer of gold.

In June 2016, Goldcorp was named one of Corporate Knights magazine's Best 50 Corporate Citizens in Canada. In the same year, the company was also ranked among Canada's Top 100 Employers. Goldcorp has repeatedly been accused of harming the environment, livestock, and public health in multiple studies by advocacy groups and activists, contaminating areas with toxic heavy metals by its mining activities. These allegations have been denied by the company and none have been proven in a court of law. The company's track record around transparency, policies and practices has improved since a damning 2010 study accused the company of human rights violations.

== Operations ==
=== Operating locations ===
Goldcorp’s operating assets included mines in Canada, Mexico, Central and South America. Goldcorp also has a number of projects including the Coffee, Cochenour and Borden projects in Canada, and NuevaUnión (formerly known as Project Corridor), a joint venture with Teck Resources in Chile.

=== Mines ===
1. Red Lake mine (Canada)
2. Porcupine mine (Canada)
3. Musselwhite mine (Canada)
4. Éléonore mine (Canada)
5. Peñasquito mine (Mexico)
6. Cerro Negro mine (Argentina)
7. Marlin mine (Guatemala)
8. Pueblo Viejo mine (Dominican Republic - 40% ownership)
9. Alumbrera mine (Argentina - 37.5% ownership)
10. Coffee project (Canada)
11. Cochenour project (Canada)
12. Borden project (Canada)
13. NuevaUnión project (Chile - 50% ownership)
14. Hollinger Mines (Canada)

In 2017, Goldcorp announced it had formed a 50/50 joint venture with Barrick Gold to consolidate the Maricunga Gold Belt in the Atacama Region of northern Chile. On June 9, Goldcorp acquired the minority 25% interest held by Kinross Gold in Cerro Casale and 100% interest in the Quebrada Seca exploration project for US$260 million and a 1.25% royalty interest in favour of Kinross on 25% of gross revenues from payable metal from Cerro Casale and Quebrada Seca, with Kinross foregoing the first $10 million payable, a contingent payment of $40 million payable after a construction decision at Cerro Casale, and assumption of a $20 million obligation to Barrick payable on commercial production at Cerro Casale.

In April 2017, Goldcorp closed on the sale of its Los Filos gold mine Guerrero State, Mexico to Leagold Mining for US$350 million. The transaction included US$279 million in cash and $71 million in common shares of Leadgold. Goldcorp also nominated Russell Ball, the Leagold's board of directors.

In June 2017, Goldcorp announced it had formed a 50/50 joint venture with Barrick Gold to develop the Maricunga District in Chile. The transaction included the acquisition of Exeter Resource Corp. along with a US$260 million payment at closing to Kinross Gold. Goldcorp also granted Kinross a 1.25% royalty on the Cerro Casale and Quebrada Seca deposits.

A week-long protest and blockade disrupted operations at the Peñasquito mine during the first week of October 2017.

== Financial ==
=== 2017 ===
In Q2 2017, Goldcorp reported net earnings of US$135 million and production of 635,000 ounces of gold.

In Q1 2017, Goldcorp reported net earnings of US$170 million and production of 655,000 ounces of gold.

=== 2016 ===
In 2016, Goldcorp produced 2.873 million ounces of gold at all-in sustaining costs of $856 per ounce.

=== 2015 ===
In 2015, production totalled 909,400 ounces for the fourth quarter and 3,464,400 ounces for the full year 2015, compared to 890,900 ounces and 2,871,299 ounces, respectively, in 2014.

Financials (US $ Millions)	2015	2014
Revenues	$4,375	$3,436
Adjusted Net Earnings	($88)	$498
Cash Flow from Operations	$1,430	$1,014
Cash & Cash Equivalents	$326	$482
Total assets at Dec 31	$21,428	$27,866

== History ==
Goldcorp was officially incorporated in 1994. Following a period of M&A activity, the company quickly grew to become a leading gold producer. The company is focused on responsible mining practices with safe, low-cost production in areas of low political risk. Through the consistent application of its business strategy, Goldcorp has achieved significant growth, industry recognition, and numerous awards.

In 2000, Goldcorp founder Rob McEwen launched the Goldcorp Challenge, sharing with the public the company’s geological data with the offer of $575,000 in prizes to those who could help locate Red Lake mine’s next six million ounces of gold. The challenge was successful, with more than 110 sites identified and more than 80 percent of sites yielding significant gold reserves. The challenge helped turn the company from a struggling enterprise into one of the most profitable in the industry.

As of the third quarter of 2014, Goldcorp was the world's fourth-largest producer of gold.

In January 2017, Goldcorp announced it had divested two non-core assets through the sales of the Cerro Blanco Gold Project in Guatemala to Bluestone Resources, as well as the Los Filos Mine in Mexico to Leagold Mining.

In January 2017, Goldcorp reported preliminary full year 2016 production totaling 2.873 million ounces of gold at all-in sustaining costs of around $850 per ounce. The Company expects to increase total annual gold production by over 20% over the next five years to more than three million ounces annually.

In February 2017, Goldcorp announced it had purchased New Gold's 4% gold stream on the El Morro deposit. The El Morro deposit is part of NuevaUnión, a 50/50 joint venture with Teck Resources that combines the Relincho and El Morro deposits.

On 14 January 2019, Goldcorp agreed to a merger acquisition by Newmont Mining Corporation, the world’s second-largest producer of gold, with the merged "Newmont Goldcorp" to be the world’s largest producer. In 2020, the merged company's name was shortened to Newmont.

== Environmental impact ==
The environmental, economic and human impact of the company’s Latin American mines has been a controversial topic for a number of years.

=== San Martin Mine, Honduras ===
A study by Italian activist Flaviano Bianchini in 2006 found dangerous levels of arsenic and lead in the blood of Hondurans living downstream from Goldcorp's San Martín mine, located in the Siria Valley. While people living in the valley had equated their health problems with the mine's operations since it opened in 1999, both the company and the Honduran government disputed the study's findings. Honduran authorities, the company said, took water samples during three visits in 2008 and all pH measurements were normal. They also reviewed and approved the mine's closure plan. Both Goldcorp and the Honduran government have been accused of a cover-up.

In 2009, two studies commissioned by the UK-based advocacy group CAFOD have found the company's methods to extract gold from low-grade deposits also releases other toxic heavy metals such as arsenic, mercury and lead, contaminating streams and groundwater. The first study from Newcastle University detected acidic mine drainage, whereby sulphides in the rock are exposed to oxygen and water and produce sulphuric acid, which can have devastating effects on animals and plants. A follow-up study by the same university found evidence of "severe" contamination in the form of highly acidic and metal-rich water from the mine site flowing into a stream used by villagers for agriculture and domestic purposes.

Since the closure of San Martin mine in 2008, the 1,500 hectare former mine site has been reclaimed into agricultural farmland and the former camp facilities remodeled into an ecotourism hotel. These developments have since provided employment, skills training and new investment to the area.

=== Marlin Mine, Guatemala ===
An investigative report by the CTV Television Network's W5, published on their website on April 17, 2010, reported criticism by human rights workers about the damage they believe mining companies were doing to the people, the land, and the culture of Guatemala. The same news program ran a four-part documentary entitled "Paradise Lost" which explored some of the controversy surrounding Goldcorp's Marlin mine operation, and investigated the economic, environmental, and social costs and benefits of Canadian mining operations in Central America.

At the request of Goldcorp shareholders, an independent human rights impact assessment (HRIA) was conducted by external auditors in 2010. Goldcorp has since implemented all recommendations from the HIRA, including the publishing of an official Human Rights Policy in 2010.

On 15 July 2012, the self-organized International Peoples’ Health Tribunal, a panel of twelve "judges" with backgrounds in science, health, ecology, and human rights met in Guatemala to hear testimony relating to the effects of Goldcorp's South American mines. After the two-day tribunal, the panel found Goldcorp financially liable for health and ecological damages to the communities near its mines in Honduras, Guatemala, and Mexico.

=== Pueblo Viejo, Dominican Republic ===
The Pueblo Viejo mine is an open-pit gold and silver mine in the Sánchez Ramírez Province of the Dominican Republic where mining operations started in 2012 and expect to cease in 2041. It is the largest gold mine in Latin America and 13th largest gold mine in the world. The mine is run by Pueblo Viejo Dominicana Corporation (PVDC), which is 60% owned by Barrick Gold Corporation and 40% owned by Newmont Corporation.

Pueblo Viejo employs approximately 2,350 employees and 2,500 contractors. The economic activities of the mine represent 2% of the Dominican Republic’s gross domestic product and Pueblo Viejo is the largest corporate taxpayer in the country.

The mine has generated an environmental conflict, because pollution from the tailings dam and windblown particulates have contaminated rivers and killed local livestock who ingested the toxins. Local communities say that the mine has ruined their lives and caused many health problems: skin lesions are common; children are sickened by chemical vapors; and agricultural land is no longer productive. Local people have asked to be relocated away from the mine since 2013, but neither the government nor the company have responded to their requests.

The company proposed to expand the mine in 2019, meeting with fierce resistance from communities in Yamasá who would be impacted by the expansion.

== See also ==
- Gold as an investment
- Gold mining
