= Dome Mine =

Canadian gold and silver mine (1910–2017)

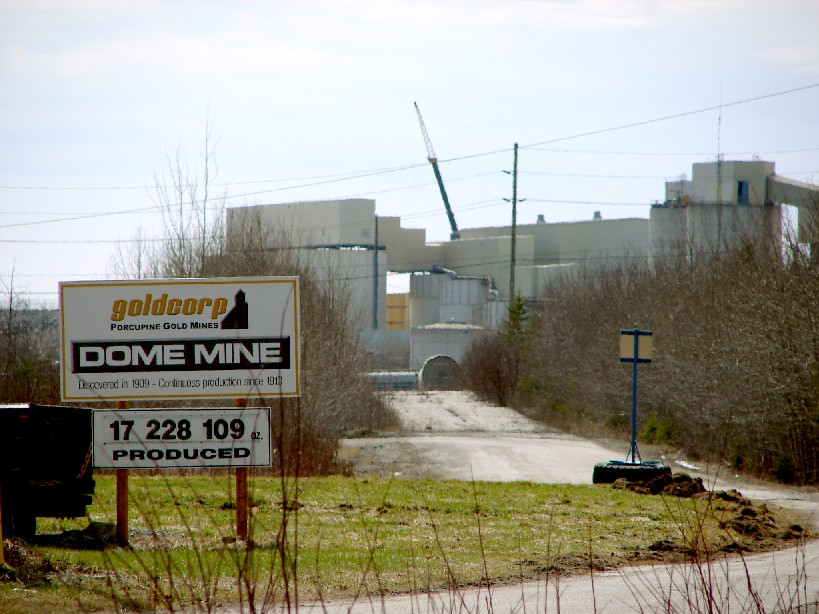
- Entrance to the Dome Mine

- Location in Ontario
- Location: Timmins, Ontario, Canada; 48°27′N 081°14′W
- Products: Silver, Gold
- Discovered: 1909
- Opened: 1910 by Dome Mines (company created to develop the mine)
- Closed: 2017
- Company: Discovery Silver
- Website: https://discoverysilver.com/projects/porcupine/dome-mine/
- Acquired: 2025 (purchase by Discovery Silver)

Dome Mine is situated in the City of Timmins, Ontario, Canada; and was developed during the Porcupine Gold Rush. Last operated by Canadian company Goldcorp, before it became a subsidiary of American company Newmont. In 2025, Newmont sold its entire Porcupine Complex to Discovery Silver Corp., transferring ownership of the Dome Mine along with the Hoyle Pond, Hollinger, Pamour, and Borden operations.

The original Dome Mine was discovered by Jack Wilson of the Harry Preston crew in 1909, one of the crews whose successful finds launched the Porcupine Gold Rush. The vein Preston discovered dripped with gold and was referred to as the "Golden Staircase".

A new company, Dome Mines Limited, was capitalized in 1910 to develop the namesake Dome Mine, producing 247 tons of high-grade ore its first year. The company built a community, also called Dome, of approximately 60 houses leased to miners with families. The mine was developed using open-pit mining for the first 200 feet, then resorted to underground mining methods.

After the Great Porcupine Fire of 1911 ravaged communities and mining infrastructure throughout the region, the mine was rebuilt such that by March 1912, a 40-stamp mill was processing 400 tons a day. The mine was incorporated in 1912 and acquired Dome Extension in 1916. Through its early years, Ambrose Monell, Joseph Delamar, and Jules Bache served as presidents of Dome Mines Limited. A rich ore body was discovered at the 23-level of the Dome Extension in 1933.

Goldcorp ceased the mining operations on December 31, 2017, after 107 years of production, at that time "the longest continuously operating mine in Canada". An enormous discontinued open pit (Super Pit), huge man-made mountain of waste rock and working mill are in place at the location.

== See also ==
- List of mines in Ontario

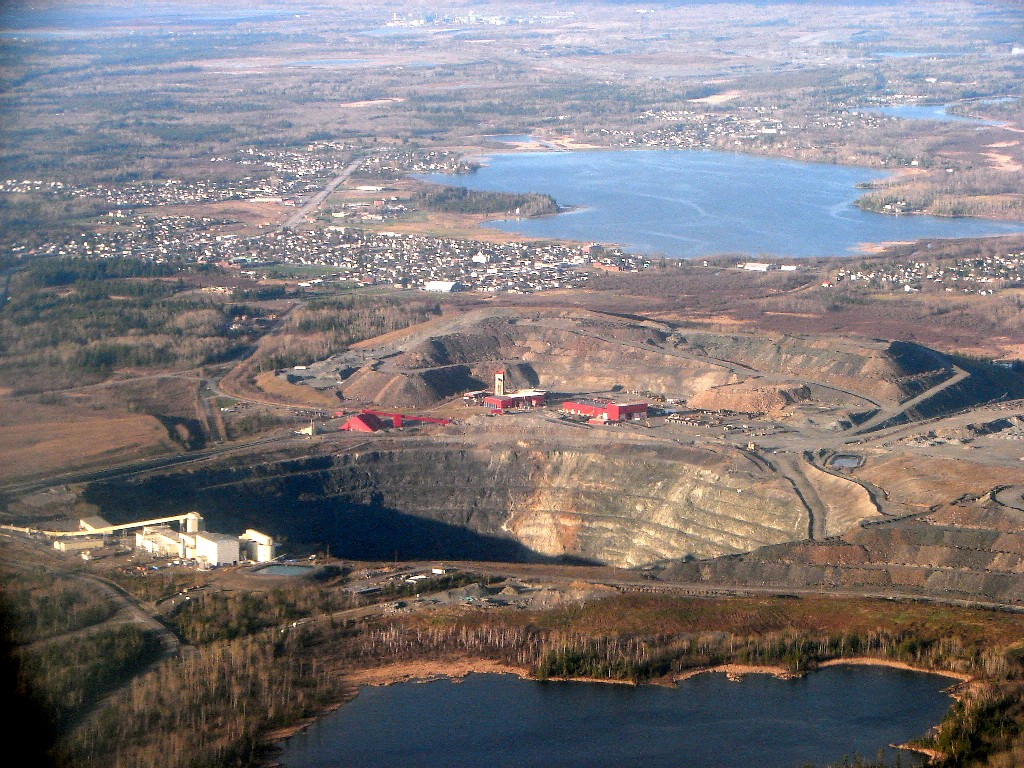
Dome Mine open pit, 2010

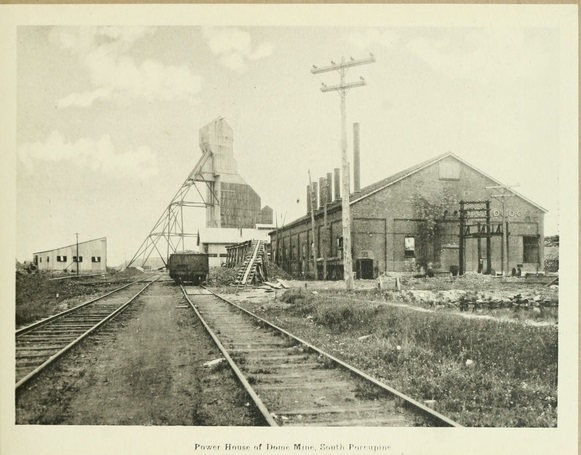
Power House of Dome Mine, South Porcupine, early 1900s

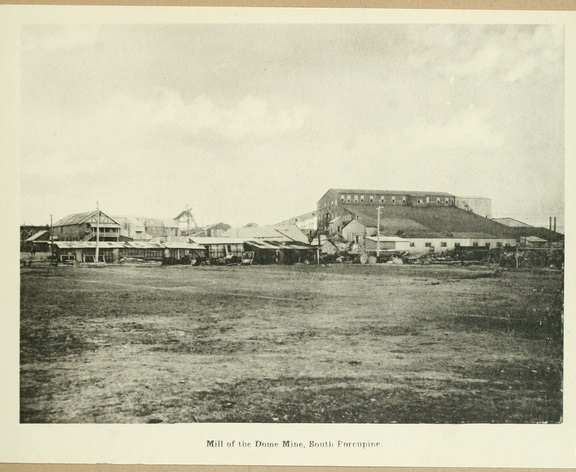
Mill at Dome Mine, South Porcupine, early 1900s
