= Musselwhite mine =

Gold mine in Ontario, Canada

Musselwhite Mine
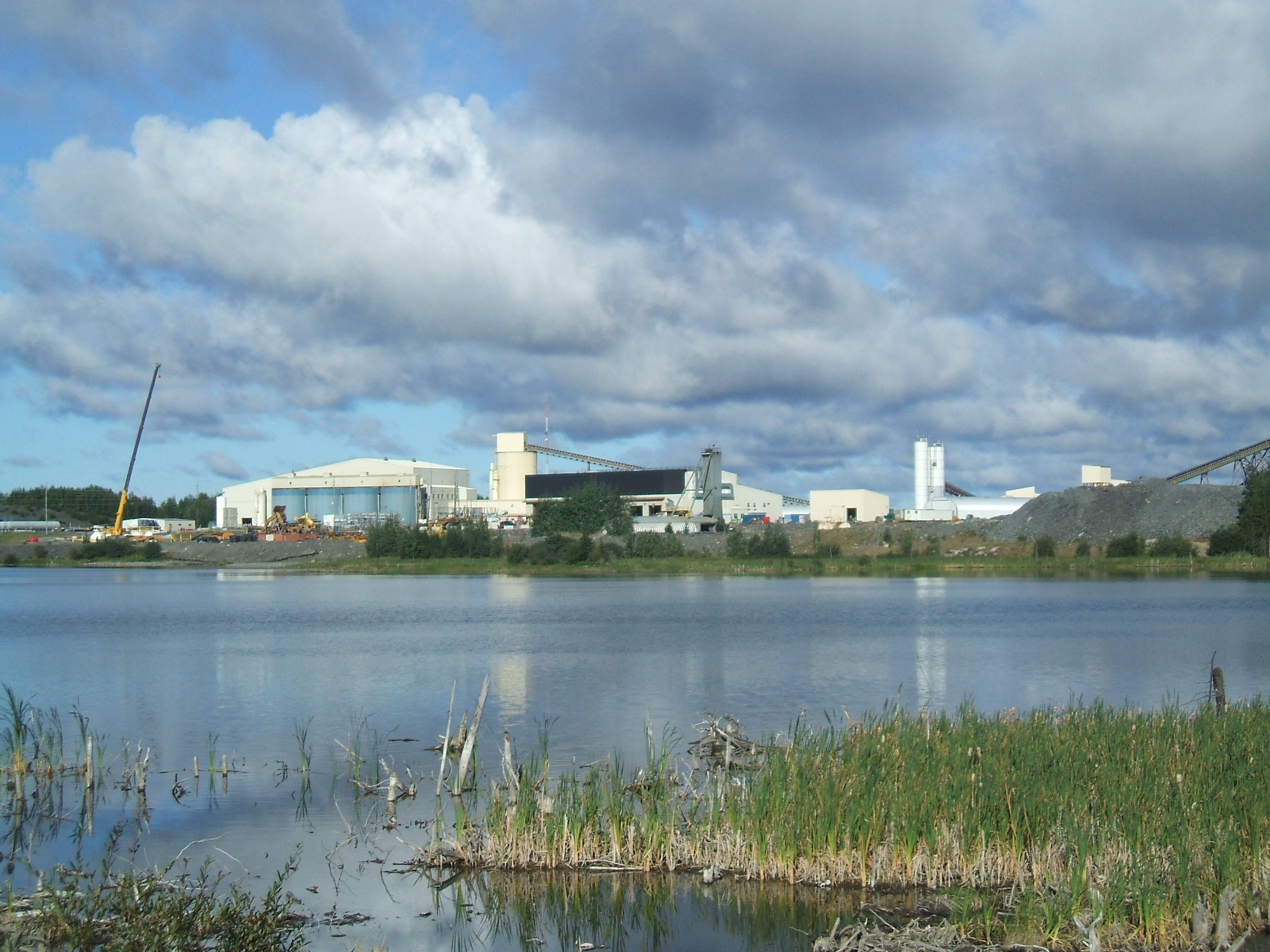

- Location within Ontario
- Location: Kenora District, Ontario, Canada; 52°36′45″N 90°22′00″W
- Products: Gold
- Opened: 1997
- Closed: 2032 (current estimate)
- Company: Equinox Gold
- Website: www.equinoxgold.com

The Musselwhite mine is one of the largest gold mines in Canada and in the world. The mine is located in the centre of the country in Ontario. The mine has estimated reserves of 2.29 million ounces (65 t) of gold.

== Operation ==
Musselwhite mine uses a gold cyanidation and CIP (carbon in pulp) extraction process. Ore is extracted via a blast hole process and moved via a series of scoop-trams and underground dump trucks to one of 3 rockbreakers, either on the surface, at a 400 or 1170 meter level. The ore then travels once through a jaw crusher and through a series of conveyor belts and continuously along a cone crusher rock sizing circuit. When the ore reaches a specific size it is transported to the mill building where the ore passes once through a rod mill and multiple times through a ball mill until the slurry is ground to approximately 10 μm. The slurry is then thickened, exposed to a cyanide treatment to extract it from the ore and into the solution, absorbed from the solution with activated carbon, rinsed off the carbon, passed through an electrowinning process and finally melted in a furnace and poured into 25 kg bars. The leftover tailings are passed through an INCO/SO_{2} cyanide destruction process. The remaining tailings are sent through a final thickening stage and are pumped into the tailings pond composed of approximately 85% solids and very little cyanide. Twice a year the excess water is drained off the tailings pond where it flows naturally through a series of polishing ponds and a freshwater marsh. By the time the runoff reaches the natural watershed system the cyanide content is drastically reduced and poses no environmental or safety hazard. The total recovery of this process is approximately 96%. Electrical power is provided by a 115 kV line running from Ear Falls to Pickle Lake and a private line from there to the site. Due to the provided utility's capacity, the site only has access to about 19.5 MW, stalling further development plans such as a mine shaft. Additional power as required or in the event of an outage is provided by a series of large diesel generators on site.

== Safety ==
Due to its remote nature (approximately 197 km from the nearest town, Pickle Lake, Ontario) safety is a major priority. An air ambulance may take upwards of 2 or more hours to transport an injured worker to Thunder Bay, due to this time factor and the general health of the 300–500 workers at the site an Occupational Health Nurse and an Occupational Medicine Physician Assistant is on site and trained in the treatment of any foreseen incident, such as the administration of sodium thiosulfate and hydroxocobalamin in the event of cyanide poisoning. In addition the mine was the first gold mine in Canada to sign the International Cyanide Management Code. All who may work in areas where contact with cyanide is a possibility are required to undergo treatment training for cyanide poisoning, due to the speed which cyanide can kill a victim prompt first aid treatment with amyl nitrite is essential until the victim can be treated with injections of sodium thiosulfate and hydroxocobalamin. The "Musselwhite mine" surface repair shops are also home to a tire cage large enough to handle the tires from the CAT 990 loader or any comparable large tire when maintenance is required on them.

== Transportation ==
Musselwhite is a fly-in fly-out operation using the Opapimiskan Lake Airport. The rotations for production and maintenance crews are generally 12-hour days 14-in 14-out. Due to the mine being a year-round operation these rotations entitle 168 working hours every 28 days, comparable to a standard 40-hour work week. This is in contrast to seasonal jobs in logging, oil drilling and mineral exploration where the rotations have longer "in" times but only run for part of the year. Transportation of personnel is contracted to Wasaya Airways. The Dash 8 300 series was purchased by the airway specifically for the transportation of personnel from Thunder Bay to the mine. Other service points to the mine include Pickle Lake and Sioux Lookout. Material (fuel, parts, explosives, reactants for processing, etc.) transportation is done by truck from the south. Due to the remote nature of the area any vehicles coming to the mine are required to contact a member of the security team before leaving Pickle Lake and embarking onto the Northern Ontario Resource Trail. Approximately 150 km from Pickle Lake traffic leaves the Northern Ontario Resource Trail and enters the mine road, travelling the remaining 43 km to the mine. Traffic arriving at the site then notifies the security team of their arrival, due to non-existent cellphone reception at the site or along the road a log of traffic must be kept. If a traveller has been out on the road for an unusual amount of time (generally 3 hours during the summer months) and cannot be reached by radio it is assumed they have encountered difficulty and a team is sent out to find them. The process is reversed for road traffic travelling the other direction. This procedure is vital in the winter months where the temperatures can drop to below −30 °C (−22 °F) and a driver experiencing engine trouble could otherwise be in a disabled vehicle without heat until another vehicle passes.
