= Murray Costello =

Canadian ice hockey player and administrator (1934–2024)

Murray Costello OC
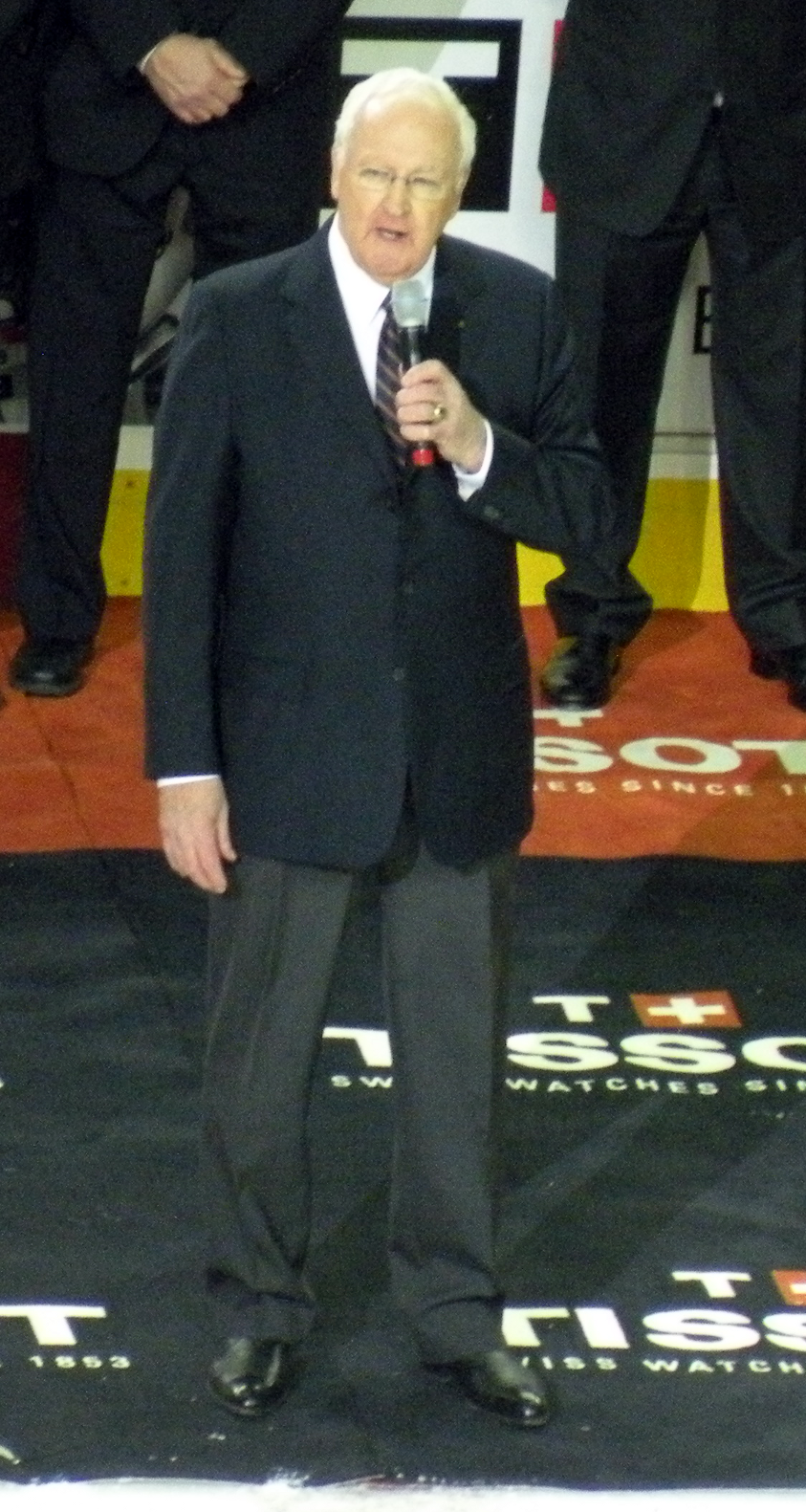
- Costello at the 2012 World Junior Hockey Championships
- Born: February 24, 1934; South Porcupine, Ontario, Canada
- Died: July 27, 2024 (aged 90)
- Education: Assumption University, University of Ottawa Faculty of Law
- Occupations: Ice hockey executive Lawyer
- Years active: 1959–2012
- Known for: Hockey Canada; Canadian Amateur Hockey Association; International Ice Hockey Federation
- Family: Les Costello
- Awards: Hockey Hall of Fame; IIHF Hall of Fame; Canada's Sports Hall of Fame; Order of Hockey in Canada; Ottawa Sport Hall of Fame
Ice hockey career
- Hockey Hall of Fame, 2005 (Builder)
- Height: 6 ft 3 in (191 cm)
- Weight: 190 lb (86 kg; 13 st 8 lb)
- Position: Centre
- Shot: Right
- Played for: Chicago Black Hawks; Boston Bruins; Detroit Red Wings
- Playing career: 1950–1965

James Murray Costello OC (February 24, 1934 – July 27, 2024) was a Canadian ice hockey player, executive, and administrator. He played four seasons in the National Hockey League and was the younger brother of Les Costello. He was a lawyer by trade and president of the Canadian Amateur Hockey Association (CAHA) from 1979 to 1994. After facilitating the CAHA merger with Hockey Canada, he continued as president until 1998.

Costello helped establish the program of excellence for the Canada men's national junior ice hockey team. He also oversaw the foundation of the Canada women's national ice hockey team and the inaugural 1990 IIHF Women's World Championship. In addition to his work on Canadian national hockey, he spent 15 seasons as an executive in the Western Hockey League, and another 14 years as an International Ice Hockey Federation council member. He was inducted into the Hockey Hall of Fame, the IIHF Hall of Fame, the Ottawa Sport Hall of Fame, and the Canada's Sports Hall of Fame, was an Officer of the Order of Canada, and a recipient of the Order of Hockey in Canada.

== Early life ==
Costello was born on February 24, 1934, in South Porcupine, Ontario. His given name was James. He grew up in Schumacher, Ontario, in a household with three brothers, one sister, and a father who worked at the Dome Mine. Costello was the younger brother of professional hockey player Les Costello. While playing hockey as a 15-year-old, Costello recalled that he once skated four miles along an ice-covered road to get home from a game, when it was unsafe to drive.

== Playing career ==
Playing in the NHL was a very special time in the sense you still traveled by train. It was the old six-team league, and the players and teams were close because we played each other so often. Just having the privilege of playing with and against players like Maurice Richard and Jean Beliveau in Montreal and Gordie Howe and Ted Lindsay in Detroit and Fernie Flaman and Leo Labine in Boston, were great times.

— Murray Costello, 2012

Costello was noticed by scouts as a teen and was convinced by his older brother, Les, to enroll at St. Michael's College School, to play hockey to pay for his education. He played three seasons of junior ice hockey with the Toronto St. Michael's Majors in the Ontario Hockey Association, reaching the J. Ross Robertson Cup finals in the 1952–53 OHA season.

Costello was signed by the Chicago Black Hawks in 1953, and was assigned to their affiliate team, the Galt Black Hawks, for the 1953–54 OHA season. Costello made his professional debut in the 1953–54 NHL season, playing 40 games with Chicago. He finished the season with the Hershey Bears in the American Hockey League, reaching the Calder Cup finals in the 1953–54 AHL season. He was traded to the Boston Bruins for Frank Martin on October 4, 1954. Costello played 54 games for the Bruins in the 1954–55 NHL season, and 41 games in the 1955–56 NHL season, when he and Lorne Ferguson were traded to the Detroit Red Wings, in exchange for Real Chevrefils and Jerry Toppazzini on January 17, 1956. After 27 games for Detroit without any points, Costello was sent down to the Edmonton Flyers early in the following season, where he finished his professional career. He played 162 games in four NHL seasons, scoring 13 goals, 19 assists, and 32 points.

Costello felt that he had the skills to play in the NHL, but not "the mindset to be an NHL player, the way they sacrificed their bodies". Costello finished his playing career with the Windsor Bulldogs in OHA senior hockey, while he earned a Bachelor of Arts degree from Assumption University in 1959.

== From Seattle to Ottawa ==
After graduation, Costello moved to Seattle, working as the marketing director of the Seattle Totems, and stayed for 15 years. He later became publicity director for the Western Hockey League. Costello rose the ranks to become director of hockey operations for the Totems, and his team won consecutive Lester Patrick Cup championships in 1967, and 1968. He moved to Ottawa in 1973, did contract work with the Canadian Amateur Hockey Association teaching and working on coaching certification programs, worked as a scout for the Phoenix Roadrunners, and studied at the University of Ottawa Faculty of Law. He completed his law degree in 1977, then worked in the legal department of the Canadian Radio-television and Telecommunications Commission, and later as an arbitrator for the World Hockey Association Players' Association. Costello was formally called to the bar on April 9, 1979.

== Canadian Amateur Hockey Association president ==
Hired by the CAHA

I was the right guy in the right spot at the right time. Changes were in the air with amateur hockey in Canada. We were among the first team sports to recognize that we had to become more corporate-like in our approach.

— Murray Costello, 2017

Costello was recruited to become the first paid staff to lead the Canadian Amateur Hockey Association (CAHA) in 1979, when the membership voted to have a full-time president instead of a volunteer executive committee. He was chosen because he had previously worked for the CAHA on contract work, and had a legal background. He succeeded Gord Renwick as CAHA president. When he originally accepted the job, he understood it to be a five-year commitment, but that evolved into a lifetime career.

=== Program of Excellence ===
The first major project by Costello was to address the lack of success by the Canada men's national junior ice hockey team at the IIHF World U20 Championship. In 1977 Canada won a silver medal, and then a bronze medal in 1978, and from 1979 to 1981, Canada placed no higher than fifth place. The CAHA had usually sent the defending Memorial Cup champion, to save on cost, but often those teams had lost graduating players and were not as strong of a team that won the championship. The CAHA wanted to send the best team possible but also feared that by not sending a team, the IIHF would turn to the rival Hockey Canada instead.

Costello proposed a "Program of Excellence" at the 1981 CAHA annual general meeting in St. John's, which entailed Canada sending the best eligible junior players from the Quebec Major Junior Hockey League, Ontario Hockey League, Western Hockey League, to a summer evaluation camp, and lending the same players during Christmas holidays to create a true Team Canada. The program also included creating under–17, and under–18 programs to feed into the juniors (under–20), and inviting eligible Canadian players from other leagues such as the USHL, or NCAA hockey. Teams were concerned about losing their best players in the middle of the season, younger players for regional development tournaments, and potential injuries. Costello said, "They didn't want to give up their best players over the holidays because that's when most of the teams would experience their best crowds. We worked hard at trying to convince them because they could show what their league is to the world, not just Canada." Costello found key allies in Ed Chynoweth, and Sherwood Bassin. The Canadian Hockey League was also assured of participating in the Program of Excellence policy committee.

Once the new program was accepted, it achieved immediate success with Canada winning the gold medal at the 1982 World Junior Ice Hockey Championships. It also proved to create player loyalty to the program, when they wanted to return to play for the Canada men's national ice hockey team. From 1988 until 2024, Canada won 18 IIHF World U20 Championships, which was credited for a return to success in ice hockey at the Olympic Games. Costello stated, "The program got us out the gate and brought us back to respectability. We had to teach our kids to play the tenacious Canadian game, but always with control and discipline".

=== Canada women's national ice hockey team ===
In 1990, the International Olympic Committee led by Juan Antonio Samaranch, was looking for ways to increase the number of events in the Winter Olympics for women, and suggested to IIHF president Günther Sabetzki, with the promise that if it was successful, Samaranch would fast-track the sport into the Olympics. Sabetzki asked Costello if the CAHA would stage a women's world championship, and he agreed as long as it could be hosted close to CAHA offices in Ottawa, to keep expenses down. Costello oversaw the formation of the Canada women's national ice hockey team, and the inaugural 1990 IIHF Women's World Championship, which led to the development of women's hockey in Canada.

== Hockey Canada president ==
The CAHA and Hockey Canada agreed to merge their organizations in 1994, following negotiation between Costello and Bill Hay. Originally known as the Canadian Hockey Association name, the merged organization operated as Hockey Canada since 1998. Combining the two groups allowed for the profits from Hockey Canada events such as the Canada Cup, and the Summit Series, to be used at the grassroots level, and it also allowed access by professionals in the NHL to international competitions such as the Ice Hockey World Championships, and eventually the Olympics.

Speaking out against violence in sports, Costello was a member of the fair play advisory committee for Ontario Hockey Association. In the wake of the Graham James scandal in 1997, Hockey Canada implemented a screening program with background checks for hockey staff and teamed up with the Canadian Red Cross to create the Speak Out against bullying and harassment, which evolved into the Respect In Sport Program. As president of Hockey Canada, he recognized the volunteers who helped in the development of minor hockey in Canada.

Costello wanted playing hockey to be affordable for youth. He felt that "there is a tendency in Canada for parents to want their kids to play up in higher competition, thinking they will learn more", and that "we really cater to the upper half of our society". He felt that year-round training for youth would lead to burn out, and advocated for youth to play other sports during summer month to benefit their skill sets.

Costello retired as president of Hockey Canada, effective July 1, 1998, at the annual general meeting. He was succeeded by vice president Bob Nicholson, who said that Costello was a great mentor, and "made every decision based on what he thought was the best interest of the sport".

== IIHF council member ==
Costello was a member of the International Ice Hockey Federation (IIHF) council from 1998 to 2012, after retiring from Hockey Canada. He served as chairman of the medical committee for 14 years, chairman of the under-20 committee from 1998 to 2003, chairman of the technical/arena committee from 2003 to 2008, vice president of the IIHF from 2008 to 2012, chairman of the competition committee from 2008 to 2012, sat on the IIHF Hall of Fame committee, and the statutes and bylaws committee. As part of the committees, he oversaw the inspection of Winter Olympic Games ice hockey facilities on behalf of the International Olympic Committee, helped organize international under-20 tournaments, oversaw random drug testing, and promoted the growth of ice hockey worldwide. Costello resigned as vice president of the IIHF, effective September 30, 2012. He later remarked, "the IIHF is very much a European organization. I don't think they would give it [the presidency] to a North American or Russian. It would give Canada too much power."

== Impact on women's hockey ==
The 1990 Women's World Cup succeeded in creating media coverage that was lacking for the women's game. Costello says it was partially due to the decision to wear pink jerseys, but he was prouder to have showcased the talent in the women's game to the International Olympic Committee. The championship game of the event drew over 9,500 fans, and the winning goal by Geraldine Heaney, was highlighted as one of the best 10 goals of the year by Hockey Night In Canada. The event's success helped the introduction of the women's game into the 1998 Winter Olympics. As of 2013, registration grew to roughly 90,000 Canadian women. While with the IIHF, Costello promised $2 million to help promote women's hockey worldwide at the 2010 World Hockey Summit. Costello is credited with growing the game worldwide, specifically in the United States. He facilitated the spread of knowledge and ideas for ice hockey and collaborated with USA Hockey on coaching education. He was honoured with the Wayne Gretzky International Award in 2012, which was established by the United States Hockey Hall of Fame, for international individuals that made major contributions to the growth and advancement of hockey in the United States.

== Personal life ==
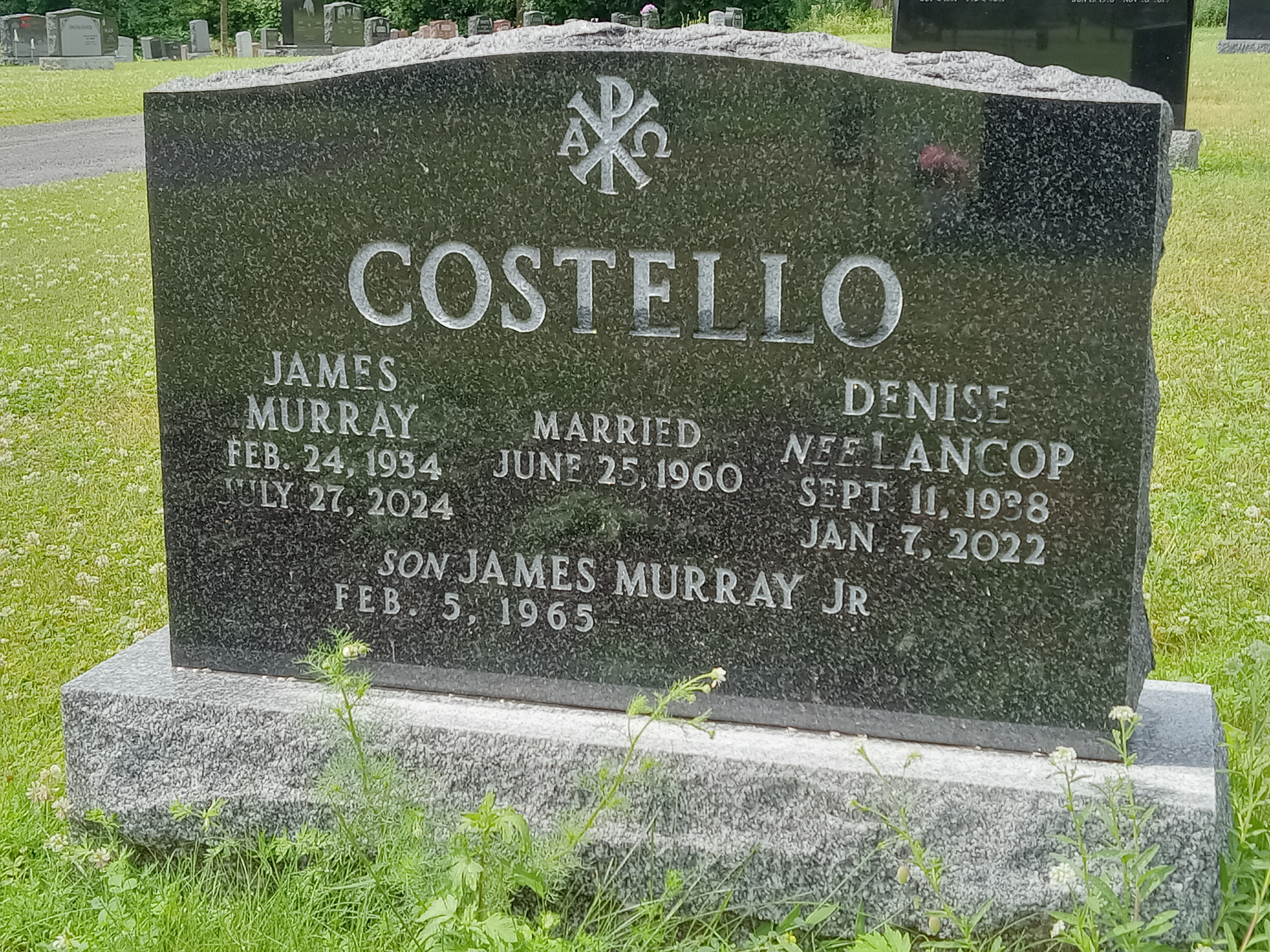
Costello's grave marker at St. Patrick's Fallowfield cemetery

Costello resided in Ottawa with his wife Denise, and they had six children. They met while attending school together in Windsor, and spent their honeymoon in Seattle, when he moved there for work. His older brother Les played with the Toronto Maple Leafs, was an ordained priest, founded the Flying Fathers in 1963, and died in 2002. Costello's wife Denise died in 2022.

Costello was on the board of directors for the Hockey Hall of Fame for 17 years and was also on the selection committee. He had also spoken out against the rising cost of minor competitive hockey, calling it an elitist sport. Costello himself was able to reach the NHL coming from a poor background by using hand-me-down equipment, but he feared that "hockey is becoming an opportunity only for the people who can pay their way in", and suggested a return to wooden sticks for minors.

Costello died at age 90 from heart failure, on July 27, 2024. His funeral was held on August 20, 2024, at St. Patrick's Fallowfield Roman Catholic Church, in Nepean, Ontario.

== Honours and awards ==
Wayne Gretzky International Award
— from USA Hockey

I was more than a little surprised because it's not often you get recognized by a nation other than your own and, for a Canadian, any award with the name Gretzky attached to it makes it that much more special.

— Murray Costello, 2012

Year	Honour / award
2005	Hockey Hall of Fame – builder category
2006	Hockey Heritage North
2008	University of Windsor Sport Achievement Award
2012	Wayne Gretzky International Award
2012	IIHF Lifetime Member
2013	Officer of the Order of Canada
2013	Canada's Sports Hall of Fame
2014	IIHF Hall of Fame
2017	Order of Hockey in Canada
2023	Ottawa Sport Hall of Fame

== Career statistics ==
=== Regular season and playoffs ===
			Regular season					Playoffs
Season	Team	League	GP	G	A	Pts	PIM	GP	G	A	Pts	PIM
1950–51	Toronto St. Michael's Majors	OHA	50	18	16	34	24	—	—	—	—	—
1951–52	Toronto St. Michael's Majors	OHA	51	16	27	43	18	8	5	8	13	4
1952–53	Toronto St. Michael's Majors	OHA	51	30	28	58	38	17	7	8	15	13
1953–54	Galt Black Hawks	OHA	3	1	0	1	0	—	—	—	—	—
1953–54	Chicago Black Hawks	NHL	40	3	2	5	6	—	—	—	—	—
1953–54	Hershey Bears	AHL	26	7	13	20	10	11	4	4	8	9
1954–55	Boston Bruins	NHL	54	4	11	15	25	1	0	0	0	2
1955–56	Boston Bruins	NHL	41	6	6	12	19	—	—	—	—	—
1955–56	Detroit Red Wings	NHL	24	0	0	0	4	4	0	0	0	0
1956–57	Detroit Red Wings	NHL	3	0	0	0	0	—	—	—	—	—
1956–57	Edmonton Flyers	WHL	65	19	26	45	37	7	0	2	2	12
1958–59	Windsor Bulldogs	OHA-Sr.	35	14	20	34	26	—	—	—	—	—
1959–60	Windsor Bulldogs	OHA-Sr.	43	18	20	38	23	17	5	7	12	12
NHL totals			162	13	19	32	54	5	0	0	0	2

== Bibliography ==
- Ferguson, Bob (2005). Who's Who in Canadian Sport, Volume 4. Markham, Ontario: Fitzhenry & Whiteside Ltd. ISBN 1-55041-855-6.
- Joyce, Gare (2011). Thirty Years of the Game at Its Best. Toronto, Ontario: Viking Books Canada. ISBN 978-0-670-06594-3.
- McKinley, Michael (2014). It's Our Game: Celebrating 100 Years of Hockey Canada. Toronto, Ontario: Viking Books Canada. ISBN 978-0-670-06817-3.
- Podnieks, Andrew (1998). Red, White, and Gold: Canada at the World Junior Championships 1974–1999. Toronto, Ontario: ECW Press. ISBN 1-55022-382-8.
- Young, Scott (1989). 100 Years of Dropping the Puck. Toronto, Ontario: McClelland & Stewart. ISBN 0-7710-9093-5.
