= Greig Hicks =

Canadian ice hockey player (1933–2022)

- Born: August 10, 1933; Schumacher, Ontario, Canada
- Died: June 7, 2022 (aged 88)
- Height: 5 ft 8 in (173 cm)
- Weight: 145 lb (66 kg; 10 st 5 lb)
- Position: Center
- Shot: Left
- Played for: Chicoutimi Sagueneens; Cleveland Barons; Buffalo Bisons
- Playing career: 1950–1962

Greig Hicks (August 10, 1933 – June 7, 2022) was a Canadian professional hockey player who played 285 games for the Chicoutimi Sagueneens in the Quebec Hockey League between 1954 and 1959. He was the league's leading scorer in the 1958–59 season, with 86 points. He also played for the Cleveland Barons and Buffalo Bisons of the American Hockey League. Hicks died on June 7, 2022, at the age of 88.
