= Timmins Square =

Coordinates: 48.474°N 81.38°W

- Location: Timmins, Ontario, Canada
- Opened: 1976
- Manager: Bayfield Property Management Inc.
- Owner: Bayfield Realty Advisors Inc.
- Num. of stores: 50
- Num. of anchor tenants: 4
- Floor area: 281,168 square feet (26,121.4 m^{2})
- Floors: 1
- Website: http://timminssquare.com/

Timmins Square is a shopping centre in the Mountjoy neighbourhood of Timmins, in Northeastern Ontario, Canada. It has 281,168 square feet (26,121.4 m^{2}) of space. It has approximately 50 stores. Characterized as a regional shopping centre, Timmins Square draws customers from a surrounding area whose population is about 150,000.

Built and initially owned by Multi Malls, Timmins Square opened in 1976. Campeau Corporation bought the mall in 1982. The mall was expanded in 1989 to accommodate Sears as an anchor tenant. Other anchor tenants over the years have included Walmart, Kmart, Dominion Stores, Zellers, Winners, and Sport Chek. In 2000, an outpost of the Timmins Museum: National Exhibition Centre opened in the mall; items believed to be particular tourist draws included an outfit Shania Twain wore for the 1999 Country Music Association Awards.

As of 1999, the mall was owned by Laing Property Corporation, which is based in Vancouver. The mall was purchased by RioCan in May 2001. In 2006 a renovation was completed, the first major updates since the mall opened 30 years prior.

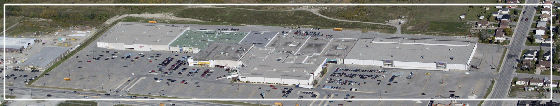
