= Exhibition game =

Disconnected sporting event

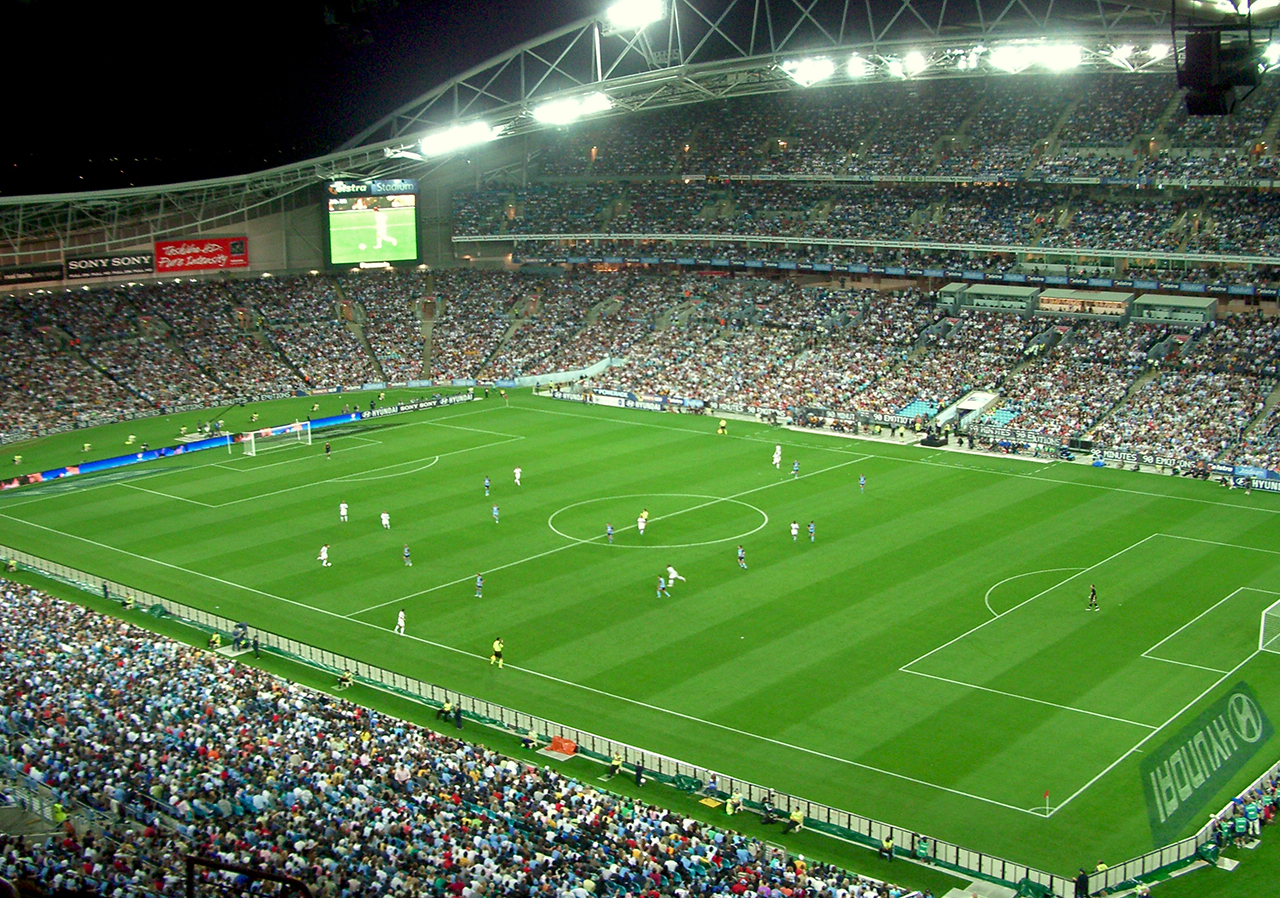
Sydney FC playing a friendly match against the Los Angeles Galaxy at ANZ Stadium in November 2007

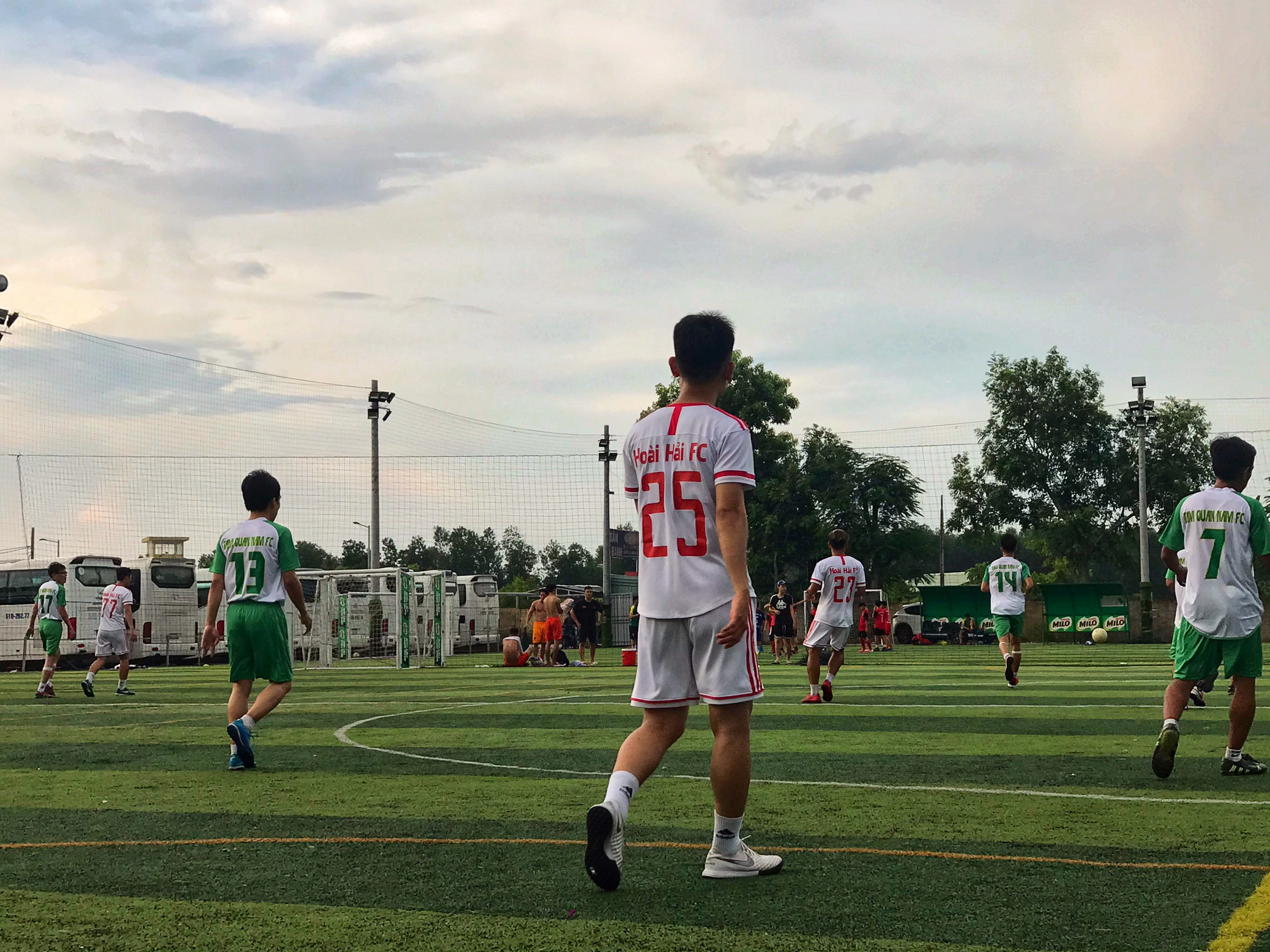
A friendly match in Vietnam

An exhibition game (also known as a friendly, scrimmage, demonstration, training match, pre-season game, warmup match, or preparation match, depending at least in part on the sport) is a sporting event whose prize money and impact on the player's or the team's rankings are either zero or otherwise greatly reduced. Exhibition games often serve as "warm-up matches", particularly in many team sports where these games help coaches and managers select and condition players, before the competitive matches of a league season or tournament. If the players usually play on different teams in other leagues, exhibition games offer an opportunity for the players to learn to work with each other. The games can be held between separate teams or between parts of the same team.

An exhibition game may also be used to settle a challenge, to provide professional entertainment, to promote the sport, to commemorate an anniversary for a famous player, as part of a goodwill tour, or to raise money for charities. Several sports leagues hold all-star games to showcase their best players against each other, while other exhibition games may pit participants from two different leagues or countries to unofficially determine who would be the best in the world. International competitions like the Olympic Games may also hold exhibition games as part of a demonstration sport.

== Association football ==
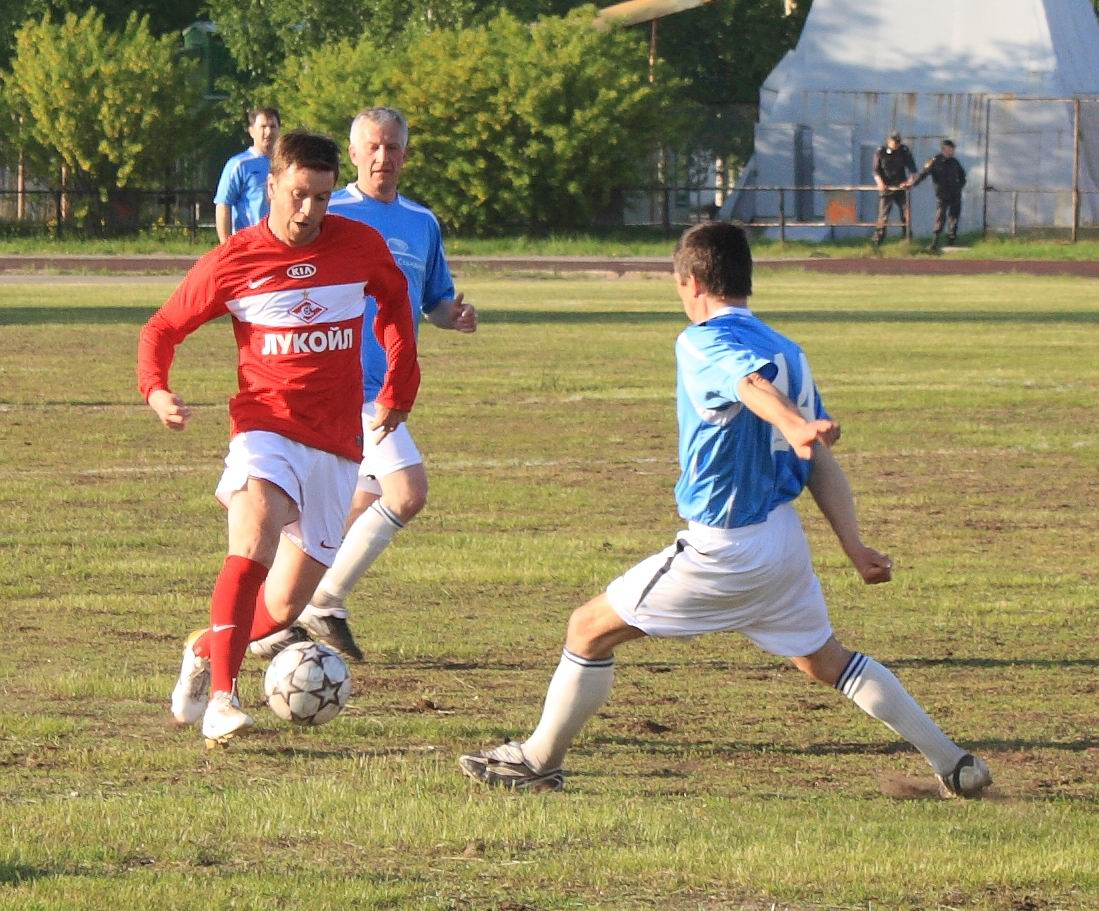
Exhibition game of veterans of FC Spartak Moscow against a team from Severodvinsk in Russia

In the early days of association football, friendlies were the most common type of match. However, with the development of The Football League in England in 1888, league and cup tournaments became the primary methods of competition. The significance of friendly matches thus declined since the 19th century: by 2000, national leagues were established in almost every country throughout the world, with local or regional leagues for lower-level teams.

=== Club football ===
Since the introduction of league football, most club sides play a number of friendlies before the start of each season (called pre-season friendlies). Friendly football matches are considered to be non-competitive and are mostly used to "warm up" players for a new season/competitive match. Some rules may be changed or experimented with, such as unlimited substitutions (which allow teams to play less experienced players). Frequently such games take place between a large club and nearby smaller clubs, such as those between Newcastle United and Gateshead, or on a large club on an international tour against local opponents. Since the 2000s, friendlies played in the United States have become increasingly lucrative for European teams.

Although most friendlies are simply one-off matches arranged between the clubs in which a certain amount is paid by the challenger club to the incumbent club, some teams do compete in short tournaments, such as the Emirates Cup, Teresa Herrera Trophy, International Champions Cup and the Amsterdam Tournament. Although these events may involve sponsorship deals, a trophy, and television broadcasts, there is little prestige attached to them. In addition, club teams may tour other continents as part of global branding campaigns.

=== International football ===
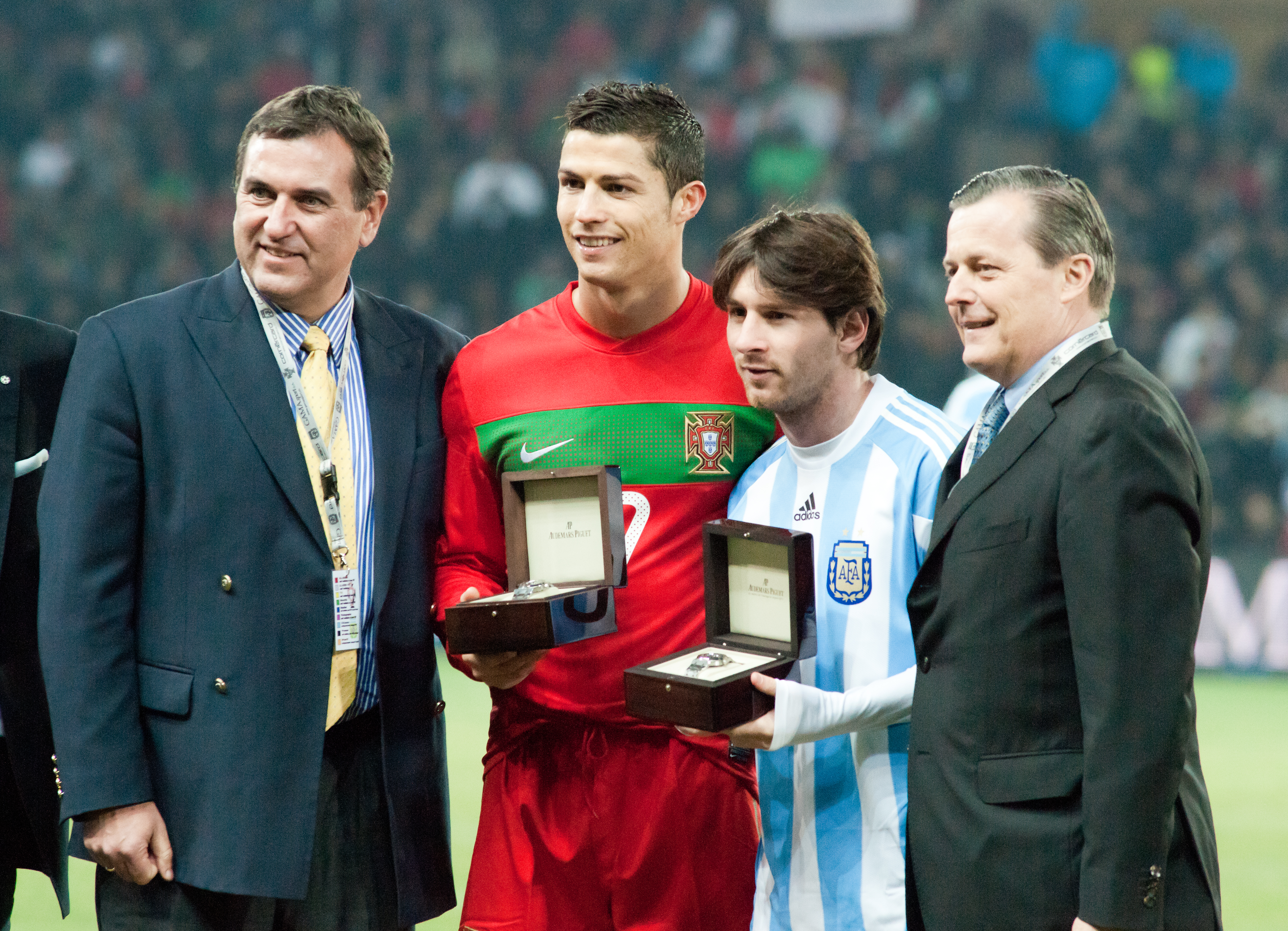
Cristiano Ronaldo and Lionel Messi taking part in ceremonies before a Portugal–Argentina friendly in Switzerland, 2011

International teams also play friendlies, generally in preparation for the qualifying or final stages of major tournaments. This is essential, since national squads generally have much less time together in which to prepare. The biggest difference between friendlies at the club and international levels is that international friendlies mostly take place during club league seasons, not between them. This has on occasion led to disagreement between national associations and clubs as to the availability of players, who could become injured or fatigued in a friendly.

International friendlies give team managers the opportunity to experiment with team selection and tactics before the tournament proper, and also allow them to assess the abilities of players they may potentially select for the tournament squad. Players can be booked in international friendlies, and can be suspended from future international matches based on red cards or accumulated yellows in a specified period. Caps and goals scored also count towards a player's career records. The results can play a part in affecting the country's FIFA ranking. In 2004, FIFA ruled that substitutions by a team be limited to six per match in international friendlies in response to criticism that such matches were becoming increasingly farcical with managers making as many as 11 substitutions per match. An international match loses its official status if this regulation is breached.

Matches in multinational football tournaments such as the King's Cup, the Kirin Cup, Intercontinental Cup and the China Cup are usually considered international friendlies by FIFA.

=== Fundraising game ===
In the UK and Ireland, "exhibition match" and "friendly match" refer to two different types of games. The types described above as friendlies are not termed exhibition matches, all-star matches such as those held in the US Major League Soccer, Japan's J.League or South Korea's K League are called exhibition matches rather than friendly matches. A one-off match for charitable fundraising, usually involving one or two all-star teams, or a match held in honor of a player for contribution to their club, may also be described as exhibition matches but they are normally referred to as charity matches (Soccer Aid, Team UNICEF etc..) and testimonial matches respectively.

=== Training game ===
A training game is generally a non-competitive football match played between two sides usually as part of a training exercise or to give players match practice. Managers may also use bounce games as an opportunity to observe a player in action before offering a contract. Usually these games are played on a training ground rather than in a stadium with no spectators in attendance.

== American football ==
=== Professional football ===
The National Football League teams play three preseason games a year, with the exception of two teams each year who play a fourth game, the Pro Football Hall of Fame Game (previously before the 2021 season expansion, four games). These exhibition games, most of which are held in the month of August, are played for the purpose of helping coaches narrow down the roster from the offseason limit of 90 players to the regular season limit of 53 players. While the scheduling formula is not as rigid for preseason games as they are for the regular season, there are numerous restrictions and traditions that limit the choices of preseason opponents; teams are also restricted on what days and times they can play these games. Split-squad games, a practice common in baseball and hockey, where a team that is scheduled to play two games on the same day splits their team into two squads, are prohibited.

The NFL has played exhibition games in Europe, Japan, Canada, Australia (including the American Bowl in 1999) and Mexico to spread the league's popularity (a game of this type was proposed for China but, due to financial and logistical problems, was eventually canceled). The league has tacitly forbidden the playing of non-league opponents, with the last interleague game having come in 1972 between the NFL's New York Jets and the Seaboard Football League's Long Island Chiefs and the last game against a team other than an NFL team (the all-NFL rookie College All-Stars) was held in 1976.

Exhibition games are quite unpopular with many fans, who resent having to pay regular-season prices for two home exhibition games as part of a season-ticket package. Numerous lawsuits have been brought by fans and classes of fans against the NFL or its member teams regarding this practice, but none have been successful in halting it. The Pro Bowl, traditionally played after the end of the NFL season (since 2010 played the week prior to the Super Bowl), is also considered an exhibition game.

The Arena Football League briefly had a two-game exhibition season in the early 2000s, a practice that ended in 2003 with a new television contract. Exhibition games outside of a structured season are relatively common among indoor American football leagues; because teams switch leagues frequently at that level of play, it is not uncommon to see some of the smaller leagues schedule exhibition games against teams that are from another league, about to join the league as a probational franchise, or a semi-pro outdoor team to fill holes in a schedule.

=== College and high school football ===
After their spring practice, many college football teams play a public intramural exhibition game commonly called a "spring game." The purpose of this game is to promote the team and give new recruits an early chance at public game action. Many of these spring games are nationally televised, though not to the same level of prominence as intercollegiate play. True exhibition games played by college football teams are usually limited to teams playing at the Division III level, with their opponents usually consisting of universities from Japan, Canadian Junior Football League teams, or professional teams in Europe.

True exhibition games between opposing colleges at the highest level do not exist in college football; due to the importance of opinion polling in the top level of college football, even exhibition games would not truly be exhibitions because they could influence the opinions of those polled. Intramural games are possible because a team playing against itself leaves little ability for poll participants to make judgments, and at levels below the Football Bowl Subdivision (FBS), championships are decided by objective formulas and thus those teams can play non-league games without affecting their playoff hopes.

Since the 2024 season, some sportswriters have referred to the Army–Navy Game as an exhibition because it is played after the College Football Playoff selection and does not affect either American Athletic Conference standings or postseason bids.

High school football teams frequently participate in controlled scrimmages with other teams during preseason practice, but full exhibition games are rare because of league rules and concerns about finances, travel and player injuries, along with enrollments not being registered until the early part of August in most school districts under the traditional September–June academic term. Some states hold preseason events known as "jamborees" in which several pairs of high school football squads take turns playing one half (usually 24 minutes of game time) to give players some experience before the first official game. Another high school football exhibition contest is the all-star game, which usually brings together top players from a region. These games are typically played by graduating seniors after the regular season or in the summer. Many of these games, which include the U.S. Army All-American Bowl and Under Armour All-America Game, are used as showcases for players to be seen by colleges and increase their college recruiting profile, or for athletes to confirm their choice and sign their National Letter of Intent outside of National Signing Day.

=== Teams outside North America ===
Outside North America, teams will sometimes organize exhibition games as part of their pre season preparations – German Football League teams for example often schedule games against second or third tier opponents ahead of their regular season. Exhibition games are also sometimes scheduled between teams from different countries which would otherwise never play each other – including on occasion between non-North American teams and North American college teams. As a result of the COVID-19 pandemic leading to the cancellation of regular league play in many places, some teams scheduled exhibition games instead, including the Dresden Monarchs hosting the Wroclaw Panthers on September 20, 2020.

== Canadian football ==
Teams in the Canadian Football League play two exhibition games each year, in May. Exhibition games in the CFL have taken on great importance to coaching staff and players alike in that they are used as a final stage of training camp and regular season rosters are finalized after the exhibition games, which are generally referred to as "pre-season" play.

== Australian rules football ==
Australian rules football has been introduced to a wide range of places around Australia and the world since the code originated in Victoria in 1859. Much of this expansion can be directly attributed to exhibition matches by the major leagues in regions and countries where the code has been played as a demonstration sport.

== Rugby union ==
During the amateur era, there was only a limited number of rugby union competitions between national teams. Therefore, matches between national teams are never considered "exhibitions" or "friendlies", as they always have Test match status.

National teams sometimes play exhibition matches versus invitational teams like the Barbarian F.C. and Barbarian Rugby Club. Also, rugby union clubs sometimes play preseason matches.

== Baseball ==
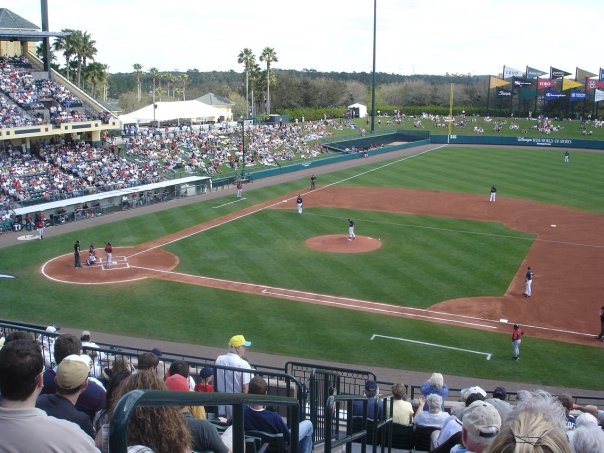
A spring training game between the Atlanta Braves and the Mets, 2008

The Major League Baseball's preseason is also known as spring training. All MLB teams maintain a spring-training base in Arizona or Florida. The teams in Arizona make up the Cactus League, while the teams in Florida play in the Grapefruit League. Each team plays about 30 preseason games against other MLB teams. They may also play exhibitions against a local college team, a minor-league team from their farm system, or even a national baseball team representing a country. Some days feature the team playing two games with two different rosters evenly divided up, which are known as "split-squad" games.

Several MLB teams used to play regular exhibition games during the year against nearby teams in the other major league, but regular-season interleague play has made such games unnecessary. The two Canadian MLB teams, the Toronto Blue Jays of the American League and the Montreal Expos of the National League, met annually to contest the Pearson Cup; this tradition ended when the Expos moved to Washington DC for the 2005 season. Similarly, the New York Yankees played in the Mayor's Trophy Game against various local rivals from 1946 to 1983.

It also used to be commonplace to have a team play an exhibition against Minor League affiliates during the regular season, but worries of injuries to players, along with travel issues, have made this very rare. Exhibitions between inter-city teams in different leagues, like Chicago's Crosstown Classic and New York's Subway Series which used to be played solely as exhibitions for bragging rights are now blended into interleague play. The annual MLB All-Star Game, played in July between players from AL teams and players from NL teams, had long been considered an exhibition match, though between 2003 and 2016 this status was questioned because the league whose team won the All-Star game had been awarded home field advantage for the upcoming World Series (prior to 2003 the leagues alternated which one of them had home field advantage; starting in 2017 the team with the better regular season record would be given home field advantage).

Another exhibition game, the Hall of Fame Game/Classic which was played in Cooperstown, New York on the weekend of inductions to the Baseball Hall of Fame, was also ended in 2008 due to interleague play and teams playing only substitutes.

== Basketball ==
=== Professional basketball ===
National Basketball Association teams usually play eight preseason games per year, with the number rarely being lower than seven. Today, NBA teams almost always play each other in the preseason but often at neutral sites within their market areas in order to allow those who can not usually make a trip to a home team's arena during the regular season to see a game close to home; for instance, the Minnesota Timberwolves will play games in arenas in North and South Dakota, while the Phoenix Suns schedule one exhibition game outdoors at Indian Wells Tennis Garden in Indian Wells, California, yearly, the only such instance an NBA game takes place in an outdoor venue. Exhibition games have also been held on occasion outside the US and Canada.

However, from 1971 to 1975, NBA teams played preseason exhibitions against American Basketball Association teams with the ABA winning the series 80 to 75 games. In the early days of the NBA, league clubs sometimes challenged the legendary barnstorming Harlem Globetrotters, with mixed success. The Minneapolis Lakers beat the Globetrotters seven games to one. The NBA has played preseason games in Europe and Asia. Beginning in 2015, the league has scheduled NBA Africa Games with players of direct African descent against players from the rest of the league; the NBA has also played against teams in Australia's National Basketball League. In the 2006 and 2007 seasons, the NBA and the primary European club competition, the Euroleague, conducted a preseason tournament featuring two NBA teams and the finalists from that year's Euroleague. In the 1998–99 and 2011–12 seasons, teams were limited to only two preseason games due to lockouts.

The annual NBA All-Star Game is an exhibition game.

Women's National Basketball Association teams play up to three preseasons games per year. WNBA teams will play each other and will also play women's national basketball teams. Most years, the WNBA also stages an All-Star Game, but this game is canceled if pre-empted by major international competitions such as the Olympic Games.

=== College basketball ===
Traditionally, major college basketball teams began their seasons with a few exhibition games. They played traveling teams made up of former college players on teams such as Athletes in Action or a team sponsored by Marathon Petroleum. On occasion before 1992, when FIBA allowed professional players on foreign national teams, colleges played those teams in exhibitions. However, in 2003, the National Collegiate Athletic Association banned games with non-college teams. Some teams have begun scheduling exhibition games against teams in NCAA Division II, NCAA Division III and the NAIA, or even against colleges and universities located in Canada. Major college basketball teams still travel to other countries during the summer to play in exhibition games, although a college team is allowed only one foreign tour every four years and a maximum of ten games in each tour.

== Bandy ==
Before the establishment of the Bandy World Championship in 1957, annually held friendly games were the main events for national teams of the sport. International friendlies are still often held.

== Ice hockey ==
Prior to the 1917–18 NHL season, an exhibition game was played on 15 December, between the Montreal Canadiens and the Montreal Wanderers. The game was played as a benefit to aid victims of the Halifax explosion.

Under the 1995–2004 National Hockey League collective bargaining agreement, teams were limited to nine preseason games. From 1975 to 1991, NHL teams sometimes played exhibition games against teams from the Soviet Union in the Super Series, and in 1978, played against World Hockey Association teams also in preseason training. Like the NFL, the NHL sometimes schedules exhibition games for cities without their own NHL teams, often at a club's minor league affiliate (e.g. Carolina Hurricanes games at Time Warner Cable Arena in Charlotte, North Carolina, home of their AHL affiliate the Charlotte Checkers; Los Angeles Kings games at Citizens Business Bank Arena in Ontario, California, home of their AHL affiliate the Ontario Reign; Montreal Canadiens games at Colisée Pepsi in Quebec City, which has no pro hockey but used to have an NHL team until 1995; Washington Capitals at 1st Mariner Arena in the Baltimore Hockey Classic; Buffalo Sabres at Pegula Ice Arena on the campus of owner Terrence Pegula's alma mater Penn State University; various Western Canada teams at Credit Union Centre in Saskatoon, a potential NHL expansion venue; and the St. Louis Blues in Kansas City, Missouri at T-Mobile Center, also a potential expansion venue that is currently considered part of the Blues' television market).

Before the Vegas Golden Knights entered the NHL in 2017, the Kings would traditionally play an annual game known as Frozen Fury in Las Vegas in a partnership with the MGM Grand Las Vegas. The game was then played at Delta Center in Salt Lake City, Utah, before it ended in 2024 due to the arrival of the expansion Utah Mammoth. Today, all teams must play six, seven, or eight preseason games. Each preseason game must have at least eight veterans dressed, except during the World Cup of Hockey. In the 1994–95 season and the 2012–13 season, no preseason games were played due to lockouts.

Since the 2000s, some preseason games have been played in Europe against European teams, as part of the NHL Challenge and NHL Premiere series. In addition to the standard preseason, there also exist prospect tournaments such as the Vancouver Canucks' YoungStars tournament and the Detroit Red Wings' training camp, in which NHL teams' younger prospects face off against each other under their parent club's banner.

In 1992, goaltender Manon Rhéaume played in a preseason game for the Tampa Bay Lightning, becoming the first woman to suit up for an all-male pro sports team in North America.

The Flying Fathers, a Canadian group of Catholic priests, regularly toured North America playing exhibition hockey games for charity. One of the organization's founders, Les Costello, was a onetime NHL player who was ordained as a priest after retiring from professional hockey. Another prominent exhibition hockey team is the Buffalo Sabres Alumni Hockey Team, which is composed almost entirely of retired NHL players, the majority of whom (as the name suggests) played at least a portion of their career for the Buffalo Sabres.

American college hockey teams occasionally play exhibition games against Canadian college teams as well as against USA or Canadian national teams. (In men's hockey, the senior national teams are selected from NHL and other pro players, and college teams would be overmatched against those teams even if they were allowed to play them. However, the national under-18 teams are made up of amateurs, allowing college squads to play them.)

== Auto racing ==
Various auto racing organizations hold non-championship exhibition events; these events usually award no championship points to participants, but they do offer prize money to participants. The NASCAR Cup Series holds two exhibition events annually – the Cook Out Clash, held at Bowman Gray Stadium at the start of the season, and the All-Star Race, held at Dover Motor Speedway midway through the season. Both events carry a hefty purse of over US$1,000,000. NASCAR has also held exhibition races at Suzuka Circuit and Mobility Resort Motegi in Japan and Calder Park Raceway in Australia.

Other historical examples of non-championship races include the Marlboro Challenge in IndyCar racing and the TOCA Touring Car Shootout in the British Touring Car Championship. Until the mid-1980s there were also a significant number of non-championship Formula One races.

The National Hot Rod Association Pro Stock teams will have a preseason drag meet held before the traditional start in Pomona. The Pro Stock Showdown is a preseason drag meet held for the Pro Stock teams held at The Strip at Las Vegas Motor Speedway.

== Boxing ==
Exhibition fights were once common in boxing. Jack Dempsey fought many exhibition bouts after retiring. Joe Louis fought a charity fight on his rematch with Buddy Baer, but this was not considered an exhibition as it was for Louis' world Heavyweight title, and as a championship fight, it counted on both boxers' records. Muhammad Ali fought many exhibitions, including one with Lyle Alzado. In more modern times, Mike Tyson, Julio César Chávez, Jorge Castro, and Floyd Mayweather Jr. have been involved in exhibition fights.

Although not fought for profit, amateur bouts (usually) and sparring sessions are not considered to be exhibition fights.

== Sumo ==
In sumo wrestling, official tournaments (honbasho) are held six times per year, in the cities of Tokyo, Osaka, Nagoya, and Fukuoka. In between the tournaments, regional tours known as jungyō (巡業) are undertaken to bring sumo wrestling to more regions of Japan. In addition to exhibition bouts, there are "demonstrations of hairdressing, comedy sumo and sumo singing", as well as opportunities for fans to meet with wrestlers and for sumo stables to find new recruits.

== See also ==
- Criterium
- Sparring
