= Nancy Baxter =

Canadian surgeon and researcher

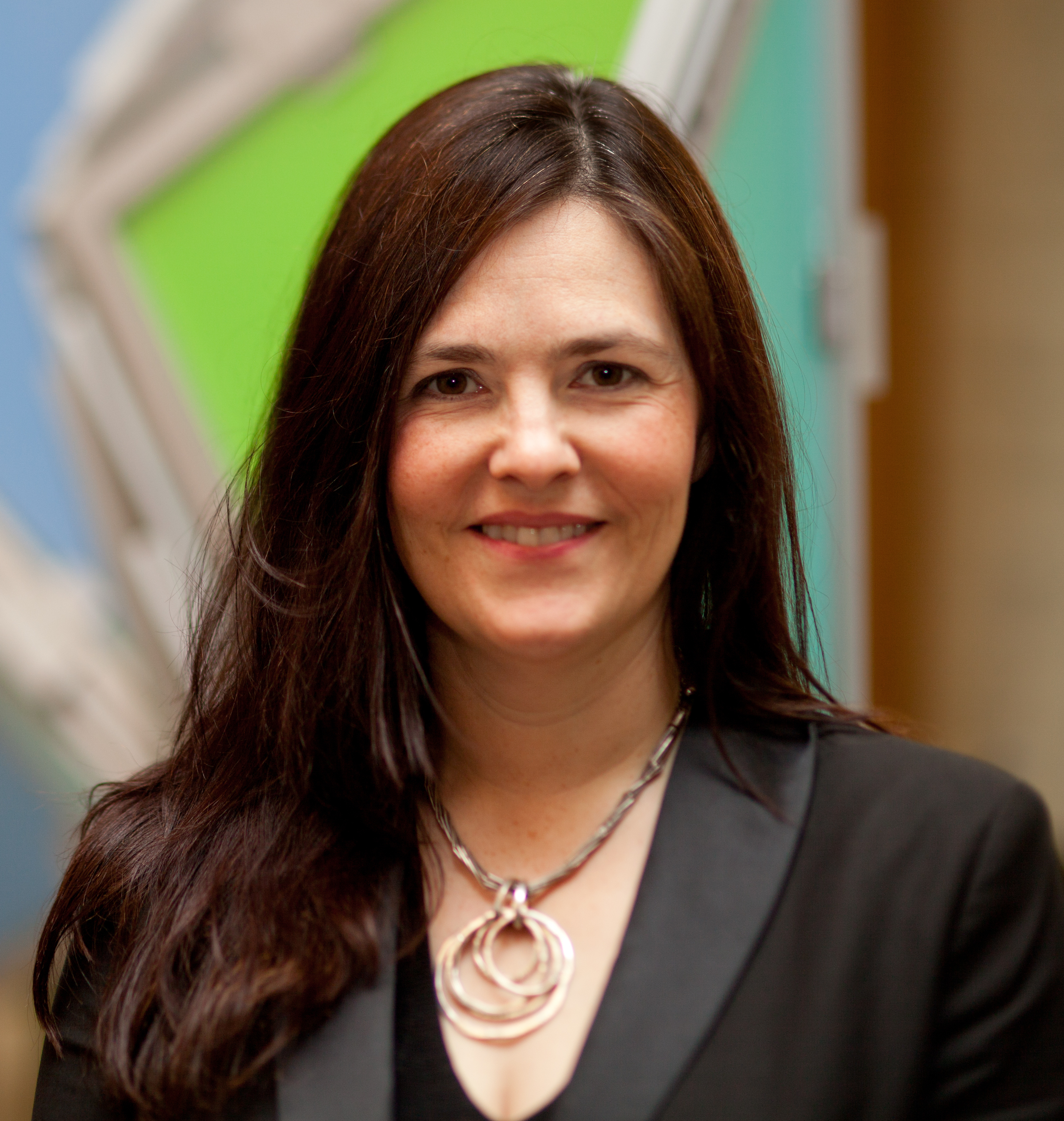
Baxter in 2014

Nancy Baxter is a Canadian surgeon and academic who is Vice-President and Dean of the Faculty of Health Sciences at McMaster University. She was previously the Deputy Executive Dean (Research Centres) of the University of Sydney's Faculty of Medicine and Health from 2024 to 2026, Head of Melbourne University's School of Population and Global Health from 2020 to 2024 and continues to maintain her appointment as Professor of Surgery in the Department of Surgery and the Institute of Health Policy, Management and Evaluation at the University of Toronto. She is a scientist with the Li Ka Shing Knowledge Institute and is a senior scientist in the Cancer Theme Group with the Institute for Clinical Evaluative Sciences (ICES). Baxter has board certifications through the American Board of Surgery (2000) and the American Board of Colon and Rectal Surgery (2002). She is a Fellow of the American College of Surgeons, the Royal College of Physicians and Surgeons of Canada, and the American Society of Clinical Oncology.

Baxter was the associate dean, academic affairs at the Dalla Lana School of Public Health from 2016 to 2020. She was Provincial GI Endoscopy Lead for Ontario at Cancer Care Ontario from 2013 to 2020.

== Biography ==
Baxter was born in South Porcupine, Ontario. She obtained her medical doctorate (1990) and PhD in clinical epidemiology (1998) from the University of Toronto. She completed her general surgery residency training at the University of Toronto from 1991 to 1999, followed by a fellowship in colorectal surgery at the Mayo Clinic in 2001. From 2002 to 2005, she held the rank of Assistant Professor of Surgery at the University of Minnesota and a staff position as a colorectal surgeon at the University of Minnesota Fairview Hospital. Baxter relocated back to Toronto in 2006 with the academic rank of assistant professor at the University of Toronto and staff colorectal surgeon at St. Michael's Hospital, and was promoted to the rank of Associate Professor of Surgery in 2008. In 2013, she was selected as the American College of Surgeons (ACS) Traveling Fellow to Australia and New Zealand (ANZ). She has been a full professor at the University of Toronto since 2015.

In September 2016, Baxter was inducted as a Fellow of the Canadian Academy of Health Sciences.

== Research ==
Baxter's primary research focus as a clinical epidemiologist and health services researcher is the effectiveness of colorectal cancer screening, long-term outcomes of cancer survivors and quality of surgical care. She also applies the use of linked health administrative data and cancer registry data to evaluate long-term consequences of cancer care for adults.

Baxter has published more than 350 peer-reviewed publications in journals including New England Journal of Medicine (NEJM), Journal of the American Medical Association (JAMA), Journal of Clinical Oncology, Annals of Internal Medicine , British Medical Journal (BMJ) and Canadian Medical Association Journal.

Prof Baxter has established expertise in the evaluation of cancer screening with a reputation for "out of the box" thinking. With the Canadian Task Force on Preventative Health Care, she conducted a systematic review of the literature regarding the effectiveness of breast self-examination and produced guidelines recommending against the routine teaching of breast self-examination – the systematic review found that routine teaching of breast self-examination did not improve survival from breast cancer but was associated with an increased number of physician visits and benign breast biopsies. The guidelines generated marked controversy at the time of publication, but the conclusions have gained widespread acceptance and have helped lead to a change in Canadian recommendations for breast cancer screening.

Baxter N, with The Canadian Task Force on Preventive Health Care. Preventive health care update: Should we routinely teach breast self-examination to screen for breast cancer. Can Med Assc J 2001; 164:1837-1847.

In 2008, Baxter led a study that found colonoscopy was less effective at finding cancers on the right side and therefore reduced mortality only from left-side tumors.

In 2014, the Canadian Cancer Society announced funding for a project led by Baxter to create a clinical decision-making tool designed to help young cancer patients make choices about preserving their fertility after cancer treatment.

In 2015, Baxter led a study that showed that patients having elective surgery during the day fare no better or worse if the doctor operating has worked the night before.

A 2016 study led by Baxter showed that organ transplant recipients have a higher-than-average risk of dying from cancer, possibly warranting increased prevention and screening measures.
