= Les Costello =

Canadian ice hockey player and Catholic priest

Father Les Costello
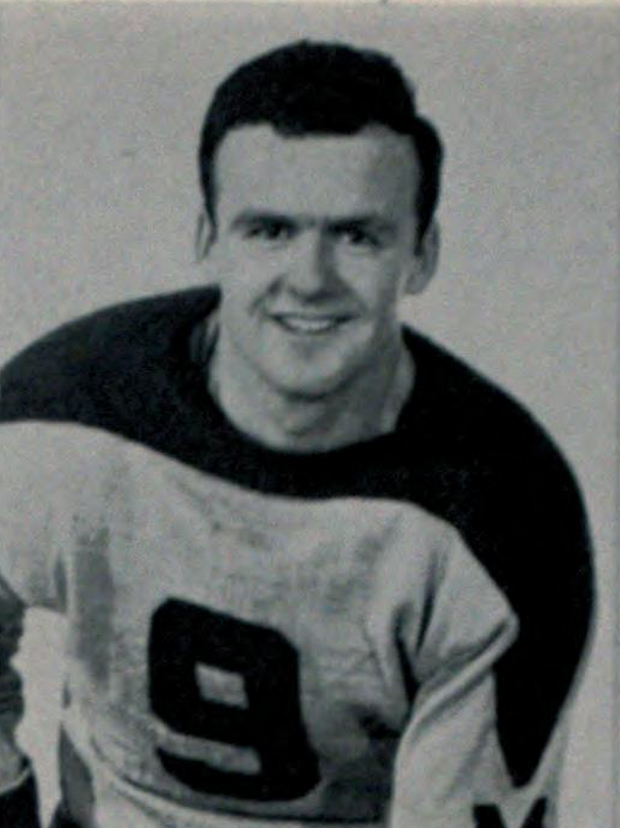
- Costello at St. Michaels, c. 1947
- Born: February 16, 1928 South Porcupine, Ontario, Canada
- Died: December 10, 2002 (aged 74) Toronto, Ontario, Canada
- Height: 5 ft 8 in (173 cm)
- Weight: 158 lb (72 kg; 11 st 4 lb)
- Position: Left wing
- Shot: Left
- Played for: Toronto Maple Leafs
- Playing career: 1946–1950

Fr. Leslie John Thomas Costello (February 16, 1928 – December 10, 2002) was a Canadian ice hockey player and Catholic priest.

== Early life and education ==
He was born in South Porcupine, Ontario, a neighbourhood of Timmins, and played hockey as a teenager, eventually joining Toronto's St. Michael's Majors in the 1940s, winning the Memorial Cup twice with the team in 1945 and 1947. He subsequently played two years in the National Hockey League for the Toronto Maple Leafs, including the 1948 Stanley Cup championship team. His brother Murray was also a professional hockey player.

Costello retired from professional hockey in 1950 to pursue seminary studies at St. Augustine's Seminary, and was ordained in 1957. After serving briefly in Cobalt and Kirkland Lake, he took a parish in his hometown of Timmins, where he was widely respected for both his flamboyant, fun-loving demeanor and his tireless commitment to social justice and charity work.

== Flying Fathers ==
In 1963, Costello and colleague Brian McKee founded the Flying Fathers, a group of Catholic priests who played exhibition hockey.Originally intended as a one-time charity event, The Fathers became a phenomenon, regularly touring North America to raise money for charity, and were still active as of 2005.

In 1979, Costello got lost for over 24 hours on a camping trip and subsequently had several toes amputated due to frostbite. Although his disability significantly impaired his skating ability, he continued his involvement with the team, stuffing rolled-up socks into the toes of his skates. Costello began referring to his remaining three toes as "The Father, the Son and the Holy Ghost". The incident also attracted international media attention, including coverage in People magazine and on the television show Real People.

As a result of the media coverage, Francis Ford Coppola offered the Fathers a movie option. He brought Wayne Gretzky to Hollywood to audition for the role of Costello, but the film fell apart when Gretzky's acting ability proved unable to carry a film. (However, it was on that trip that Gretzky first met his future wife, Janet Jones.)

For the 25th anniversary of Costello's ordination in 1982, friends and parishioners took up a collection to buy Costello a truck for use in his charity work. Instead, Costello sold the vehicle and used the money to buy furniture and food for needy families.

== Death and legacy ==
During a Flying Fathers hockey game in Kincardine in 2002, Costello had a puck stuck in his skates, making him fall backward and hit his head on the ice. Still feeling unwell the following day, he was admitted to hospital, where he slipped into a coma and died a week later on December 10.

As his parish was unable to accommodate the crowds expected for his funeral, the service was held in Timmins' McIntyre Arena. Thousands from all over the country were reputed to have been at the funeral. Timmins native Shania Twain paid tribute to Costello:

Father Costello has been there for my family many times over the years. Whether it was to find my grandmother a second-hand fridge; marry my parents; give our family funeral services – including our beloved Mom and Dad; or just plain joining in on a good joke. He's always quick to smile and share his zest for life. The goodness of God is with this very special man and he shares that spirit with everyone around him. We all love him.

Writer and politician Charlie Angus published a biography of Costello, Les Costello: Canada's Flying Father, in 2005.

A foundation to raise funds for food banks, homeless shelters, and other anti-poverty charities in Northern Ontario was also launched in Costello's memory the same year. A major street in the city's Schumacher neighbourhood was renamed Father Costello Drive. The hockey arena in the town of Cobalt is named for Father Costello.

Costello was posthumously inducted into the Timmins Sports Heritage Hall of Fame in 2014, and a 36-inch bronze statue was erected there in his honour in April 2024.

== Career statistics ==
=== Regular season and playoffs ===
			Regular season					Playoffs
Season	Team	League	GP	G	A	Pts	PIM	GP	G	A	Pts	PIM
1943–44	South Porcupine Porkies	NOHA	—	—	—	—	—	—	—	—	—	—
1944–45	Toronto St. Michael's Majors	OHA	17	11	8	19	4	9	7	7	14	7
1944–45	Toronto St. Michael's Majors	M-Cup	—	—	—	—	—	14	8	8	16	14
1945–46	Toronto St. Michael's Majors	OHA	24	17	23	40	17	11	8	10	18	12
1946–47	Toronto St. Michael's Majors	OHA	29	29	33	62	78	9	9	7	16	13
1946–47	Barrie Flyers	M-Cup	—	—	—	—	—	10	12	9	21	13
1947–48	Pittsburgh Hornets	AHL	68	32	22	54	40	2	0	0	0	2
1947–48	Toronto Maple Leafs	NHL	—	—	—	—	—	5	2	2	4	2
1948–49	Pittsburgh Hornets	AHL	46	13	19	32	63	—	—	—	—	—
1948–49	Toronto Maple Leafs	NHL	15	2	3	5	11	—	—	—	—	—
1949–50	Pittsburgh Hornets	AHL	70	18	31	49	69	—	—	—	—	—
1949–50	Toronto Maple Leafs	NHL	—	—	—	—	—	1	0	0	0	0
AHL totals			184	63	72	135	172	2	0	0	0	2
NHL totals			15	2	3	5	11	6	2	2	4	2
