= Flying Fathers =

Hockey team made up of Canadian Roman Catholic priests

The Flying Fathers are a group of Canadian Roman Catholic priests who regularly tour North America as an ice hockey team, playing exhibition games against local teams to raise money for charities. The team had the motto "praying and playing".

== History ==
The organization was founded in 1963 by Brian McKee and Les Costello, two priests from Northern Ontario. Costello was a former professional hockey player, who played for the Toronto Maple Leafs in the 1940s, last playing 15 games during the 1948–49 season before his ordination as a priest.

Costello was in North Bay in 1963 when he heard stories about a boy who had lost use of one eye, with his single mother unable to cover medical costs. He organized some priests to play a charity game against "guys who were in worse shape" to raise funds for the family. From the game's revenues, the team donated about CA$5,000 (equivalent to $50,994 in 2025) to the mother.

The original team had no name, with the members eventually choosing between "Flying Fathers" and "Puckster Priests". A 1987 article in the Chicago Tribune described the team as "[trying] to do for hockey what the Harlem Globetrotters did for basketball". By 1987, about 100 priests had played at least one game as a member of the team.

In December 2002, Costello fell to the ice during the pre-game warmup of a Flying Fathers game after a puck got caught in his skates. He hit his head on the ice, skipped that night's game and the subsequent game, soon fell into a coma, and died six days later when his family took him off life support at St. Michael's Hospital. The team disbanded in 2009 from a lack of hockey player priests. In the early 2010s, seminarians from St. Augustine's Seminary in Toronto organized an eight-team tournament that was soon referred to as the "Father Costello Classic".

The team was re-formed in February 2019 for three benefit games in Ontario and Quebec with the hopes of a more long-term revival. It consisted of 12 priests drawn from the dioceses of Hamilton, Kingston, Ottawa, Peterborough, St. Catharines, and Toronto. The re-creation of the team was ascribed to several purposes: the Canadian cultural attachment to the game; evangelizing for the Roman Catholic Church in Canada, and to provide insight into the priesthood.

In early 2020, the Ontario State Council of the Knights of Columbus proposed that its local councils financially support the re-creation of the team so that it could embark on charity tours within the province, and later internationally to support local charities. The funds would be used to pay for tour travel expenses, which are otherwise covered by gate receipts.

== Charity ==
Originally intended as a one-off event, the Fathers became a popular phenomenon and were active until 2009. The Flying Fathers had played over 907 games, losing only 6 of these, and had raised over $4 million. Their single-game fundraising record is $240,000 at a game in Toronto.

Some of the charities to which the revenues from exhibition games were donated included the Canadian National Institute for the Blind, the Heart and Stroke Foundation of Canada, Habitat for Humanity, and the Salvation Army. The team has played exhibition games against local and recreational teams to raise funds for local parishes, retirement homes, hospices, and pregnancy crisis centres. It has also played high-school teams to raise funds for their schools.

== Games ==
According to Reverend Kris Schmidt, the games featuring the Flying Fathers are intended to be more "entertainment than playing a real hockey game", incorporating gags and other antics throughout the game, but the game must also exhibit the skill of the players. Many of the antics common during their games were established in their first game.

The first player to score for the opposing team would result in the Flying Fathers holding a faux ordination for that player, then counting his goal for the Flying Fathers instead of the opposing team. They would also have referees assess a penalty to opposing players for "acting like a Protestant".

Backup goaltenders for the team included two horses, named Patience and Penance, who were mounted by a clown and wore goalie pads. One of the player priests would ask the horse "Why are we going to win?", with the horse's response to kneel as if praying.

Every game would feature the appearance of Sister Mary Shooter, in which one of the player priests would don nun's habit and would play very aggressively, including cross-checking and slashing opposing players.

== Legacy ==
The team is the subject of the book Holy Hockey: The Story of Canada’s Flying Fathers written by Frank Cosentino.
