= Neighbourhoods in Timmins =

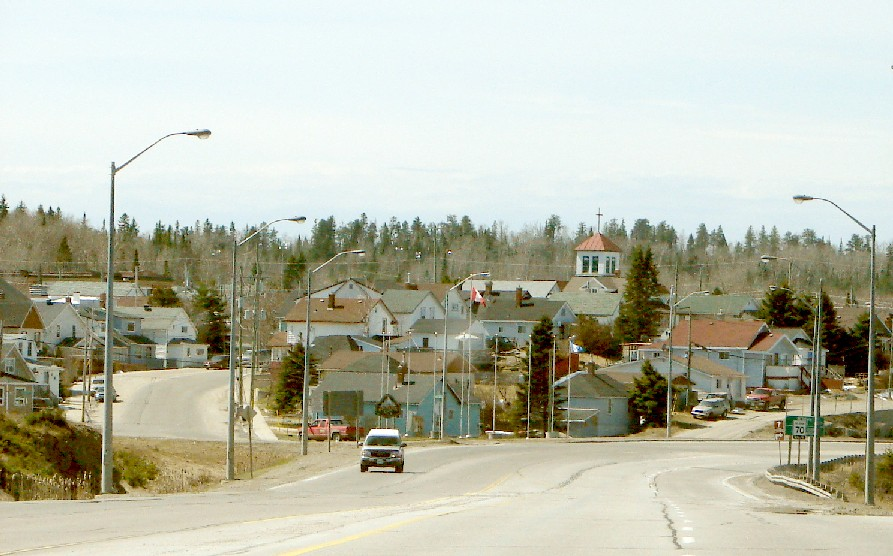
Schumacher

The city of Timmins, Ontario, Canada contains many named neighbourhoods. Some former municipalities that were merged into Timmins continue to be treated as distinct postal and telephone exchanges from the city core.

According to Barnes, "With the staking of the three great properties, The Porcupine came alive as hundreds of canoes bearing prospectors...Golden City and Pottsville sprang up, with South Porcupine soon to follow."

== Barbers Bay ==
Barbers Bay is located on the southern shore of Frederick House Lake along the municipal boundary with Iroquois Falls. It also includes an area of bays dotted with cottages to the south, and just north of Kettle Lakes Provincial Park. Recently Barber's Bay has seen a growth in its year-long residents, most notably around the densely developed Finn Bay.

== Connaught ==
A small village just west of Barbers Bay, where the Frederick House River flows into Frederick House Lake. Sometimes all of the extreme eastern portion within Timmins' city limits (Barbers Bay, Hoyle and Connaught) is referred to as Connaught because the village contains the only post office in the area. It borders both Iroquois Falls and Black River-Matheson.

Connaught was also the location of the Frederick House outpost of the Hudson's Bay Company.

== Hill District ==
Located in the northeast portion of Timmins, it is north of Algonquin Boulevard and generally East of the streets with names of trees. It does not really have any precise boundaries, but much of it is located on a hill, thus its name. Both Gillies Lake and the Timmins and District Hospital are located here. The neighbourhood has some of the oldest houses in Timmins and used to be where the wealthiest people lived including mine managers.

== Hoyle ==
Hoyle is a tiny hamlet and a series of farms located just north of Highway 101 near the Porcupine River approximately 15 km (9.3 mi) east of South Porcupine.

== Kamiskotia ==
Located Northeast of Highway 101, Kamiskotia is home to Mount Jamieson Resort, as well as many residential homes, and some cottages/camps located on Kamiskotia Lake and other smaller lakes. Due to the long winters in Timmins, Mount Jamieson Resort is a very popular winter attraction among residents and tourists.

== Mattagami Heights ==
One of the early neighbourhoods in Timmins, it was first developed along the east bank of the Mattagami River in the 1910s by prospector Charles M Auer. It is distinctive because all of it is on a hill overlooking the river, and the streets are somewhat hilly, unlike much of Timmins. It is north of Algonquin Boulevard West and mainly west of Thériault Boulevard up to Vimy Avenue. The McChesney Lumber Mill (now owned by EACOM) is located in this neighbourhood on the river.

== Melrose ==
It is the northernmost subdivision in the urban core of Timmins, bounded by Jubilee Avenue, MacLean Drive and Airport Road. Originally, the older upper section located east of College Street was known as "Melrose Heights" or "Westmount" and the newer lower area west of it "Melrose Gardens."

== Moneta ==
The area of Timmins south of downtown. It has a high concentration of people of Italian descent. Flora Macdonald Public School was originally called Moneta Public School. There is a Moneta Avenue and the Moneta Hotel, a bar/restaurant located on Pine Street South both within Moneta.

== Mountjoy ==
Mountjoy, which comprises all of the city's populated area lying west of the Mattagami River, includes the Timmins Square shopping mall, Home Depot, Canadian Tire, Mark's, Best Buy, Staples and a Walmart Supercentre. Franco-Ontarians make up the vast majority of Mountjoy's population. It was originally known as "Mountjoy Township" and was separate from Timmins until amalgamation in 1973. Also found in the Mountjoy, Le Domaine Beaurivage or more commonly known as Bonaventure Drive, is one of the city's most prominent neighbourhoods and is located on the riverbank of the Mattagami River.

== Porcupine ==
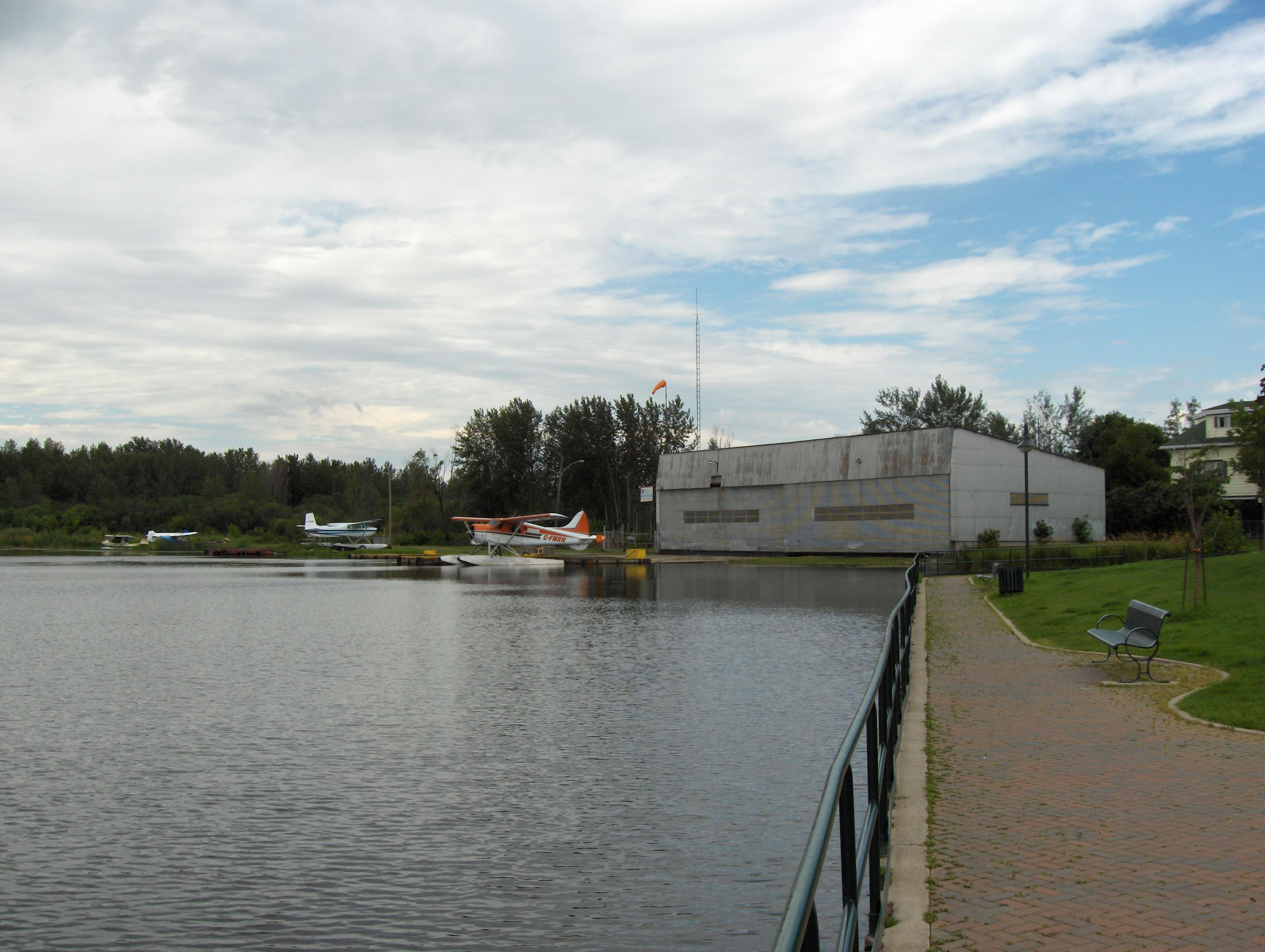
Porcupine Lake Water Aerodrome, destroyed by fire in 2015

Situated at the eastern end of Porcupine Lake, just northeast of the community of South Porcupine. Porcupine represents the easternmost part of the city's urban core. It was originally known as "Golden City" in its early days. A fire devastated the area in 1911. The great fire engulfed communities from the Porcupine to Cochrane. People fled to the lake to survive. It was founded at the beginning of the Porcupine Gold Rush. Porcupine, Pottsville and South Porcupine were the three towns making up the 19 km (12 mi) portion of gold-bearing land known as the Porcupine Camp.

=== Pottsville ===
Located on the northwest portion of Porcupine Lake west of the bridge over the Porcupine River. Located between Porcupine and South Porcupine, it constituted one of three towns making up the Porcupine camp during the Porcupine Gold Rush.

It was not originally considered to be part of Porcupine but is today. Some people consider newer neighbourhoods (Melview and Woodlands subdivisions) located to the west within Whitney Township behind the Porcupine Mall to be part of Pottsville but many disagree. The Ontario Government Complex which services the Timmins area is located here.

== Schumacher ==
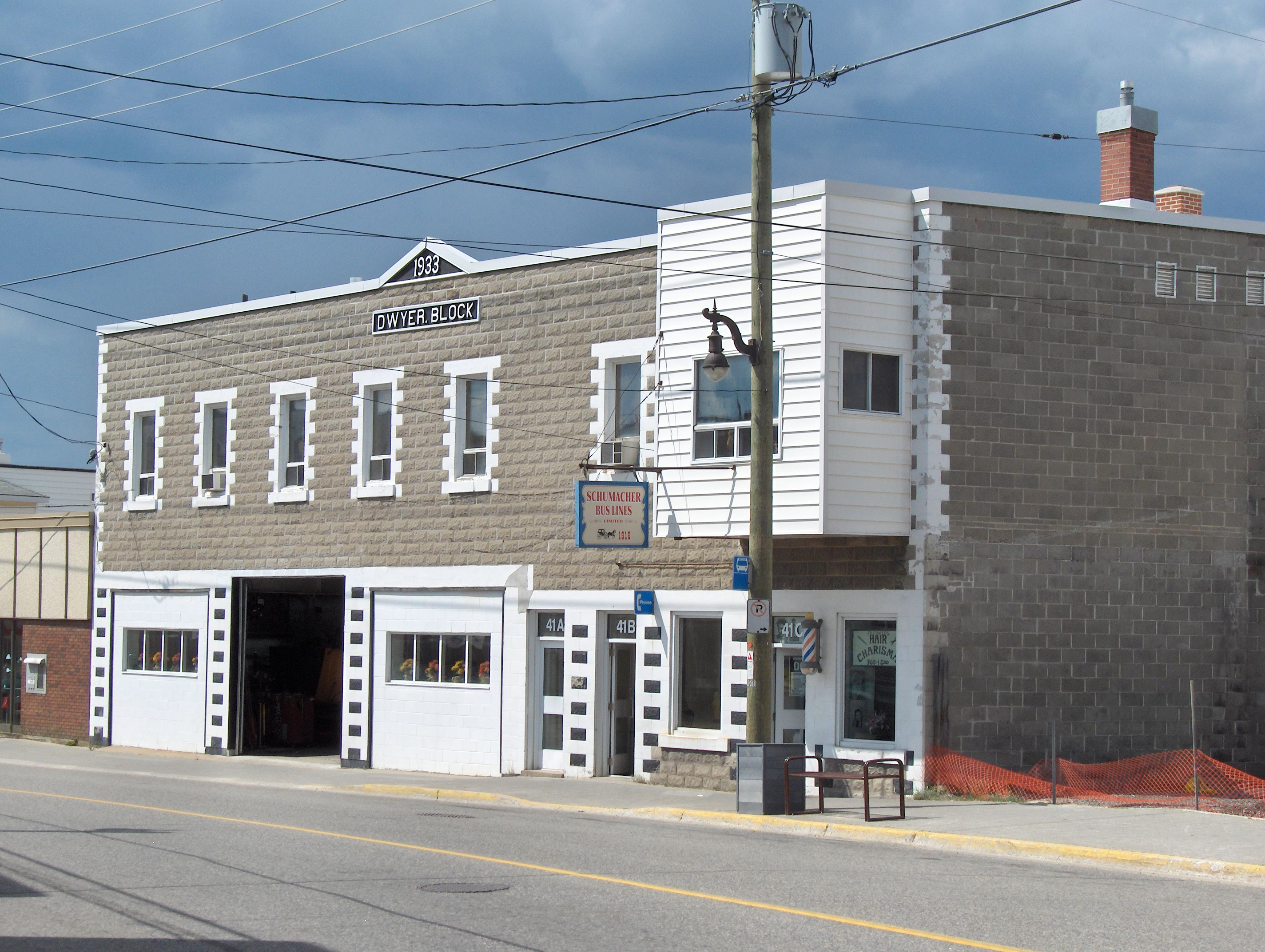
Father Costello Block in Schumacher

Schumacher, once known as Aura Lake, is named after early settler and mining prospector Frederick W. Schumacher, who sank the first mine shaft in the community during the Porcupine Gold Rush. It was once home to one of Canada's largest Croatian communities. Although it still has many people of Croatian and other European descent, more recently, many people of Aboriginal heritage (mainly Cree) have taken up residence. Schumacher was part of Tisdale Township until the township was amalgamated into the City of Timmins in 1973.

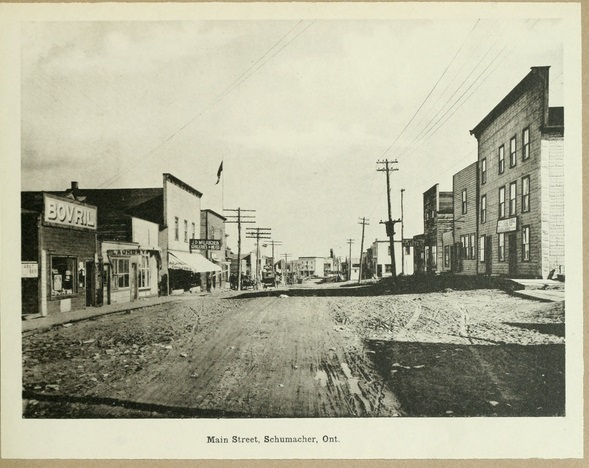
Main Street, Schumacher, Ont., early 1900s

Porcupine Gold Mines is currently engaged in a surface diamond drilling program on the previous Hollinger and McIntyre properties. This activity aims to better determine the location and extent of underground mine workings in the area, which have caused sinkholes to appear. In addition, it is done to evaluate the potential to mine remnant gold mineralization as part of a possible future open-pit mining operation. The ongoing evaluation of the properties is part of the closure planning process that Porcupine Gold Mines is completing for the Ministry of Energy, Northern Development and Mines. Preliminary indications show the possibility of more than 4 million ounces of gold in the area.

The area is also home to the McIntyre mine and the McIntyre Community Building, the primary sporting facility in Timmins, both of which were named for another early prospector, Sandy McIntyre. The McIntyre arena is also where Schumacher's most famous resident first donned his skates; Frank Mahovlich, a recipient of the Order of Canada, a Senator for the Liberal Party of Canada, and a Hockey Hall of Fame member, was born in Schumacher. Mahovlich's National Hockey League (NHL) contemporary, Dean Prentice, was also born in Schumacher.

This arena was also where Canada's own Barbara Ann Scott taught figure skating in the 1950s.

=== Gold Centre ===
Gold Centre is a small planned town site situated just 500 m (1,600 ft) southeast of Schumacher. The town site though small is still an active community of less than 100 residents today. Although still identified by its name, many consider it to be a part of Schumacher.

== South Porcupine ==
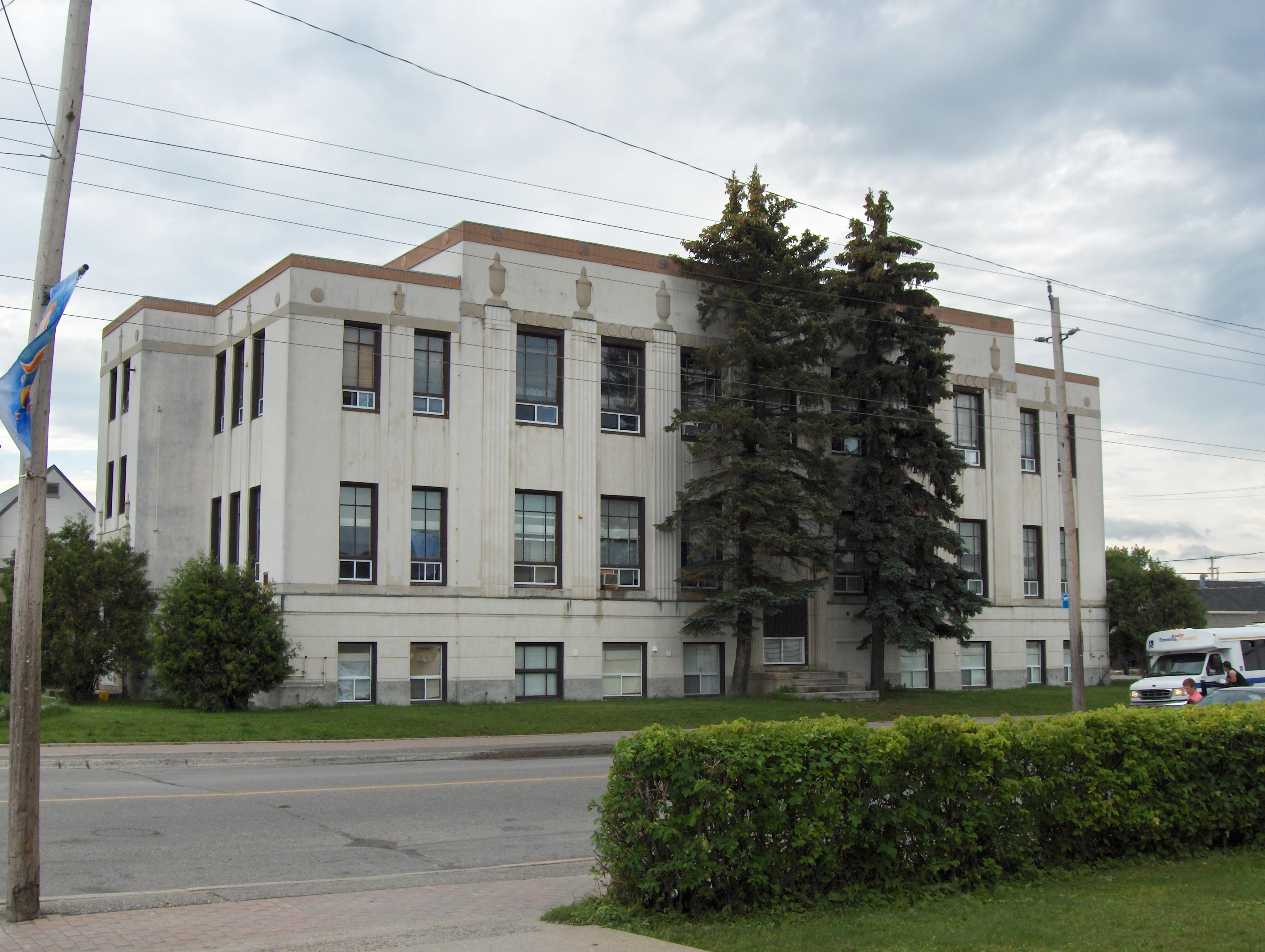
Old Tisdale Township Municipal Building in South Porcupine

South Porcupine was founded on the southwestern shore of Porcupine Lake, due to its proximity to the mines. Locally, South Porcupine is traditionally known as "South End" and also more recently called "SoPo".

The arrival of the Temiskaming and Northern Ontario Railway (T&NO) rail system in 1911 accelerated the growth of the area; until then, the trek to the South Porcupine was done by canoe and by foot from Haileybury. That same year, (two days after the first train arrived in the South Porcupine), the entire area was destroyed in the fire of 1911. Because of the importance of the gold discoveries, very few people abandoned the area and it was rebuilt in two months.

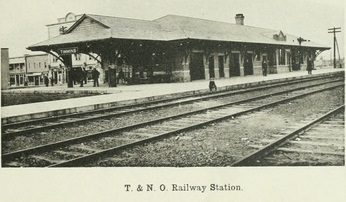
T&NO railway station in South Porcupine

The Township of Tisdale, which later included the townsite of Schumacher (established in 1911) and the town of South Porcupine, was incorporated in 1909. The Township was later amalgamated and became part of Timmins.

=== Notable people ===
- Pete Babando, ice hockey player
- Nancy Baxter, surgeon and researcher
- Danny Belisle, ice hockey player and coach
- James Connelly, ice hockey player and olympian
- Murray Costello, ice hockey player and administrator
- Les Costello, ice hockey player and Catholic priest
- Don Lever, ice hockey player
- Jim Prentice, 16th premier of Alberta
- Bob Nevin, ice hockey player
- Bruce McCaffrey, politician
- Gordon Thiessen, 6th governor of the Bank of Canada

=== Connaught Hill ===
A neighbourhood found within South Porcupine at its southernmost portion. It is located near the southwestern part of Porcupine Lake. It is not to be confused with the village of Connaught located within city limits on Frederick House Lake. It was built on a small hill as its name suggests. A railroad station once existed at the bottom of the hill.

== Mining property neighbourhoods ==
=== Buffalo Ankerite ===
Buffalo Ankerite is an old mining area and there are some homes. There is also a lake near by. If you continued down the road you would reach the GoldCorp mining area.

== Former neighbourhoods demolished due to mining activity ==
=== Dome Extension ===
Often called "Dome Ex", it was an abandoned residential community which surrounded the Dome Mine. It was "abandoned" due to the company evicting the residents in order to open pit mine the area

=== Hallnor Mine Town site ===
The Hallnor Mine Site was a small settlement, which housed workers of the nearby Pamour mine. In the late 1990s and early 2000s, the residents of the houses were evicted due to the expansion of the open pit mining operation.

=== Pamour ===
Pamour was a small settlement, which housed workers of the nearby Pamour mine. Through the 1980s and 1990s, the houses were abandoned and then razed due to the expansion of the open pit mining operation. The site was eventually entirely engulfed by the pit.

== Notable people ==
- Jim Prentice, 16th Premier of Alberta. September 15, 2014 – May 24, 2015. (South Porcupine)

== Climate ==
Timmins is near the northern periphery of the hemiboreal humid continental climate (Dfb). Timmins has cold and snowy winters, being located in Northern Ontario. Temperatures in late summer and autumn tend to be among the coolest for any non-coastal major city in Canada. During the late spring and summer, temperatures can rise considerably, sometimes accompanied by high humidity and unstable air masses. The highest temperature ever recorded in Timmins was 39.4 °C (103 °F) on July 12, 1936. The coldest temperature ever recorded was −45.6 °C (−50 °F) on February 1, 1962.

Climate data for Timmins (Timmins Victor M. Power Airport) WMO ID: 71739; coordinates 48°34′11″N 81°22′36″W; elevation: 294.7 m (967 ft); 1991–2020 normals, extremes 1913–present
Month	Jan	Feb	Mar	Apr	May	Jun	Jul	Aug	Sep	Oct	Nov	Dec	Year
Record high humidex	7.7	10.7	29.4	32.1	41.1	43.0	42.4	42.0	40.1	30.7	25.1	11.8	43.0
Record high °C (°F)	8.3 (46.9)	12.2 (54.0)	27.9 (82.2)	29.9 (85.8)	35.3 (95.5)	38.8 (101.8)	39.4 (102.9)	36.7 (98.1)	36.1 (97.0)	29.3 (84.7)	22.0 (71.6)	14.2 (57.6)	39.4 (102.9)
Mean maximum °C (°F)	1.9 (35.4)	4.0 (39.2)	12.3 (54.1)	20.3 (68.5)	29.0 (84.2)	31.5 (88.7)	31.5 (88.7)	30.9 (87.6)	27.5 (81.5)	21.6 (70.9)	11.8 (53.2)	4.3 (39.7)	33.1 (91.6)
Mean daily maximum °C (°F)	−10.4 (13.3)	−7.6 (18.3)	−0.7 (30.7)	7.2 (45.0)	16.8 (62.2)	22.4 (72.3)	24.4 (75.9)	22.8 (73.0)	17.8 (64.0)	9.1 (48.4)	0.8 (33.4)	−6.5 (20.3)	8.0 (46.4)
Daily mean °C (°F)	−16.4 (2.5)	−14.4 (6.1)	−7.5 (18.5)	0.9 (33.6)	9.7 (49.5)	15.3 (59.5)	17.7 (63.9)	16.2 (61.2)	11.7 (53.1)	4.5 (40.1)	−3.2 (26.2)	−11.2 (11.8)	1.9 (35.4)
Mean daily minimum °C (°F)	−22.3 (−8.1)	−21 (−6)	−14.4 (6.1)	−5.3 (22.5)	2.5 (36.5)	8.1 (46.6)	10.9 (51.6)	9.6 (49.3)	5.5 (41.9)	−0.1 (31.8)	−7.1 (19.2)	−15.9 (3.4)	−4.1 (24.6)
Mean minimum °C (°F)	−37.0 (−34.6)	−35.3 (−31.5)	−30.1 (−22.2)	−17.4 (0.7)	−5.3 (22.5)	−0.8 (30.6)	3.3 (37.9)	1.6 (34.9)	−2.9 (26.8)	−7.8 (18.0)	−20.0 (−4.0)	−31.3 (−24.3)	−38.5 (−37.3)
Record low °C (°F)	−44.2 (−47.6)	−45.6 (−50.1)	−38.9 (−38.0)	−29.4 (−20.9)	−13.9 (7.0)	−5.6 (21.9)	−1.1 (30.0)	−3.3 (26.1)	−6.7 (19.9)	−19 (−2)	−33.9 (−29.0)	−43.9 (−47.0)	−45.6 (−50.1)
Record low wind chill	−54.2	−53.7	−45.8	−37.1	−18.8	−8.5	0.0	−4.0	−9.3	−20.4	−38.0	−53.1	−54.2
Average precipitation mm (inches)	49.0 (1.93)	39.9 (1.57)	48.3 (1.90)	61.7 (2.43)	69.9 (2.75)	80.4 (3.17)	78.7 (3.10)	75.6 (2.98)	81.2 (3.20)	86.2 (3.39)	68.9 (2.71)	56.6 (2.23)	796.2 (31.35)
Average rainfall mm (inches)	4.0 (0.16)	1.1 (0.04)	14.3 (0.56)	35.3 (1.39)	63.5 (2.50)	77.9 (3.07)	84.8 (3.34)	77.0 (3.03)	81.7 (3.22)	66.8 (2.63)	28.1 (1.11)	8.7 (0.34)	543.1 (21.38)
Average snowfall cm (inches)	59.2 (23.3)	47.9 (18.9)	43.2 (17.0)	25.3 (10.0)	3.1 (1.2)	0.2 (0.1)	0.0 (0.0)	0.0 (0.0)	0.5 (0.2)	13.7 (5.4)	50.8 (20.0)	63.8 (25.1)	307.6 (121.1)
Average precipitation days (≥ 0.2 mm)	18.6	15.4	14.8	12.3	13.0	15.0	14.8	14.0	15.3	17.1	19.1	19.9	189.3
Average rainy days (≥ 0.2 mm)	1.6	0.89	3.7	7.1	12.1	14.6	14.7	14.3	14.9	14.1	6.5	2.9	107.4
Average snowy days (≥ 0.2 cm)	18.1	14.0	11.6	6.1	1.7	0.11	0.0	0.0	0.42	5.6	15.6	18.6	91.8
Average relative humidity (%) (at 1500 LST)	70.4	61.7	52.9	48.9	45.7	48.8	53.1	55.5	60.4	67.1	75.1	76.9	59.7
Average dew point °C (°F)	−19.0 (−2.2)	−17.9 (−0.2)	−12.8 (9.0)	−6.2 (20.8)	1.7 (35.1)	8.4 (47.1)	12.0 (53.6)	11.3 (52.3)	7.8 (46.0)	1.2 (34.2)	−5.6 (21.9)	−13.3 (8.1)	−2.6 (27.3)
Source 1: Environment and Climate Change Canada
Source 2: weatherstats.ca (for dewpoint and monthly/yearly average absolute maximum/minimum temperature)
