= Clarington Municipal Council =

Governing body of Clarington, Ontario

Type
- Type: Municipal Council
- Term limits: None

Leadership
- Mayor of Clarington: Tom Dingwall

Structure
- Seats: 7
- Length of term: 4 years (2006–present); 3 years (1982–2003)

Elections
- Last election: October 26, 2026 (7 seats)
- Next election: October 28, 2030 (7 seats)

Meeting place
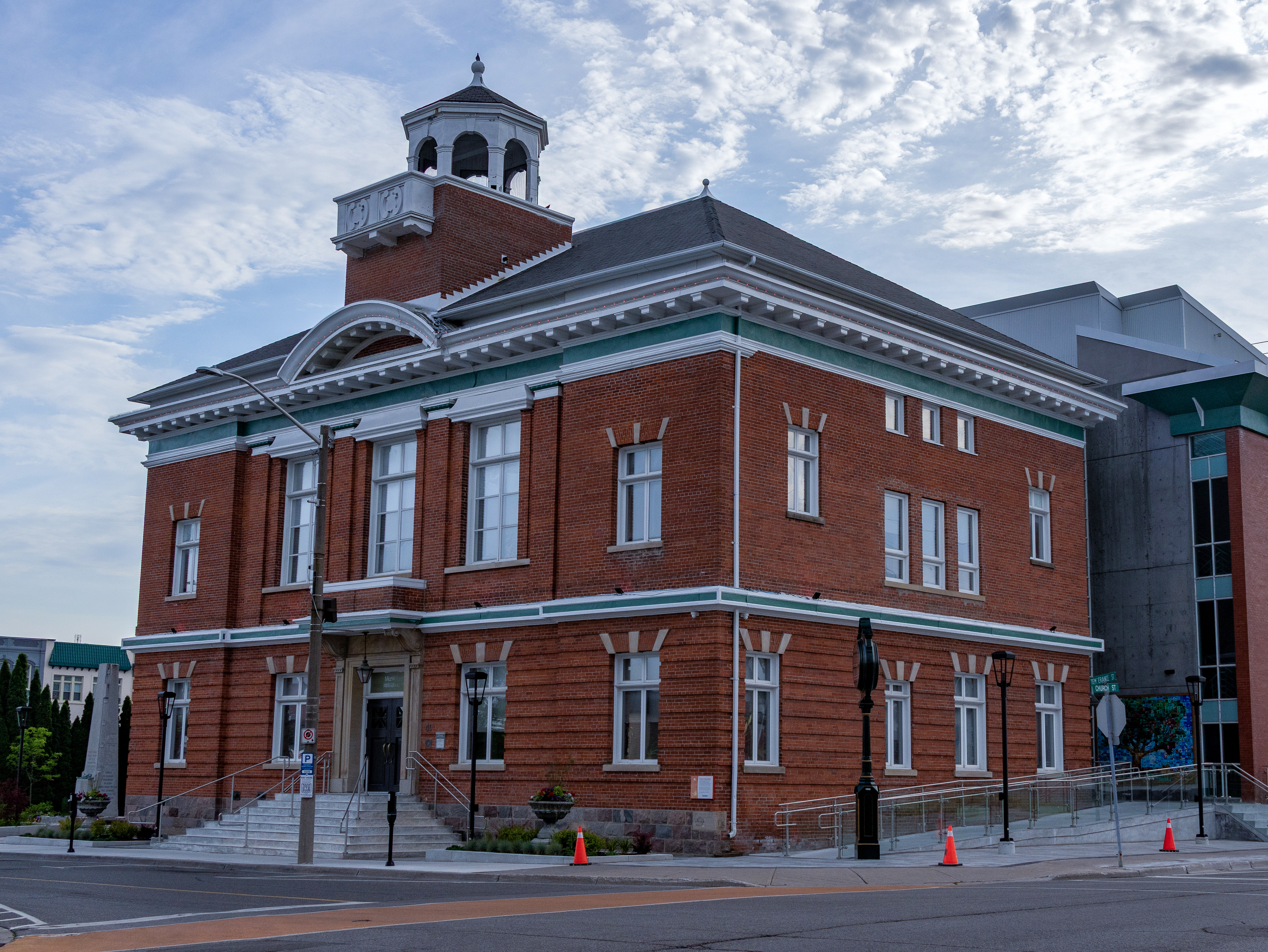
- Council Chamber; Clarington Town Hall; Bowmanville, Ontario; 43.913055°N 78.689017°W

Website
- Official website

Clarington Municipal Council is the governing body of the municipality of Clarington, Ontario, since 1993. There are 7 members on council, including the Mayor and local councillors. The current municipal body was established in 1974 when the Village of Newcastle merged with the town of Bowmanville and the townships of Clarke and Darlington, to form the town of Newcastle. In 1993, the municipality was renamed Clarington. In 1982, terms went from 2, to 3 years in length. Beginning in 2006, terms went from 3 years, to the current 4.

Council meetings are open for the general public to attend.

== 1991 Special Ballot ==
In 1991, voters were asked if they wanted to keep the name Town of Newcastle. Residents voted in favour of a name change.

"Are you in favour of retaining the name Town of Newcastle?"
Decided on November 12, 1991

Position	Name
YES	5,470
NO	7,873

== Members ==
=== Clarington ===
2026–2030 Council
Current council, Elected on October 26, 2026

Position	Name
Mayor	Tom Dingwall
Regional Councillor, Wards 1 & 2	Granville Anderson
Regional Councillor, Wards 3 & 4	Willie Woo
Local Councillor, Ward 1	Joe Neal
Local Councillor, Ward 2	Kathleen Flynn
Local Councillor, Ward 3	Corinna Traill
Local Councillor, Ward 4	Denise Robinson

2022–2026 Council
Elected on October 24, 2022

Position	Name
Mayor	Adrian Foster
Regional Councillor, Wards 1 & 2	Granville Anderson
Regional Councillor, Wards 3 & 4	Willie Woo
Local Councillor, Ward 1	Sami Elhajjeh
Local Councillor, Ward 2	Lloyd Rang
Local Councillor, Ward 3	Corinna Traill
Local Councillor, Ward 4	Margaret Zwart

2018–2022 Council
Elected on October 22, 2018

Position	Name
Mayor	Adrian Foster
Regional Councillor, Wards 1 & 2	Joe Neal
Regional Councillor, Wards 3 & 4	Granville Anderson
Local Councillor, Ward 1	Janice Jones
Local Councillor, Ward 2	Ron Hooper
Local Councillor, Ward 3	Corinna Traill
Local Councillor, Ward 4	Margaret Zwart

2014–2018 Council

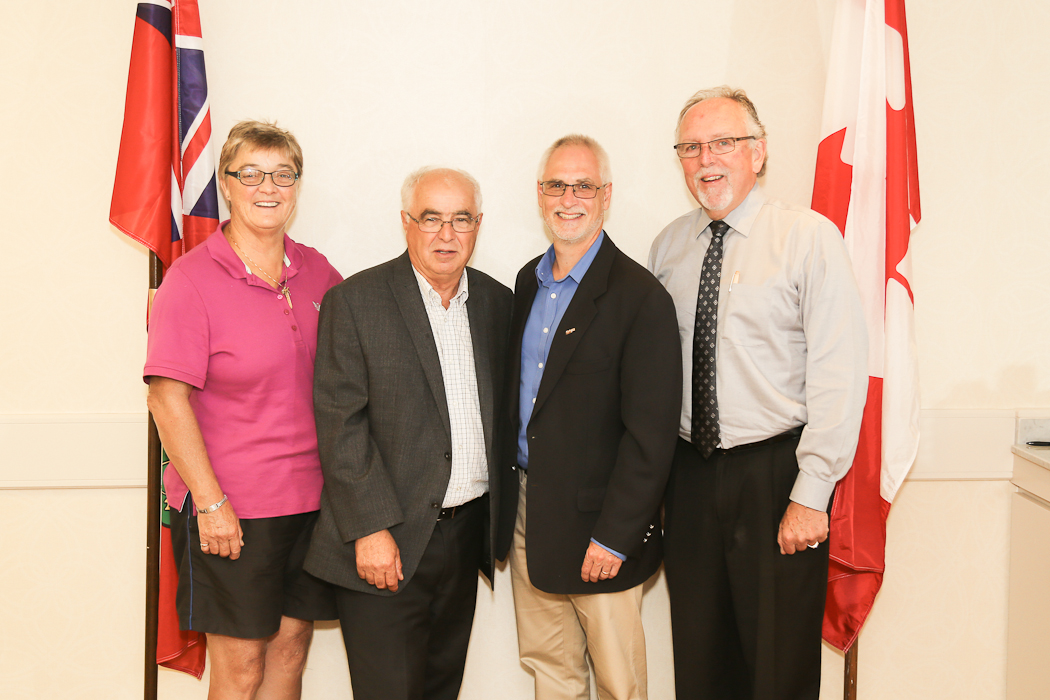
Mayor Foster (centre-right) with Wendy Partner (left) and Ron Hooper (right).

Elected on October 27, 2014

Position	Name
Mayor	Adrian Foster
Regional Councillor, Wards 1 & 2	Joe Neal
Regional Councillor, Wards 3 & 4	Willie Woo
Local Councillor, Ward 1	Steven Cooke
Local Councillor, Ward 2	Ron Hooper
Local Councillor, Ward 3	Corinna Traill
Local Councillor, Ward 4	Wendy Partner

2010–2014 Council

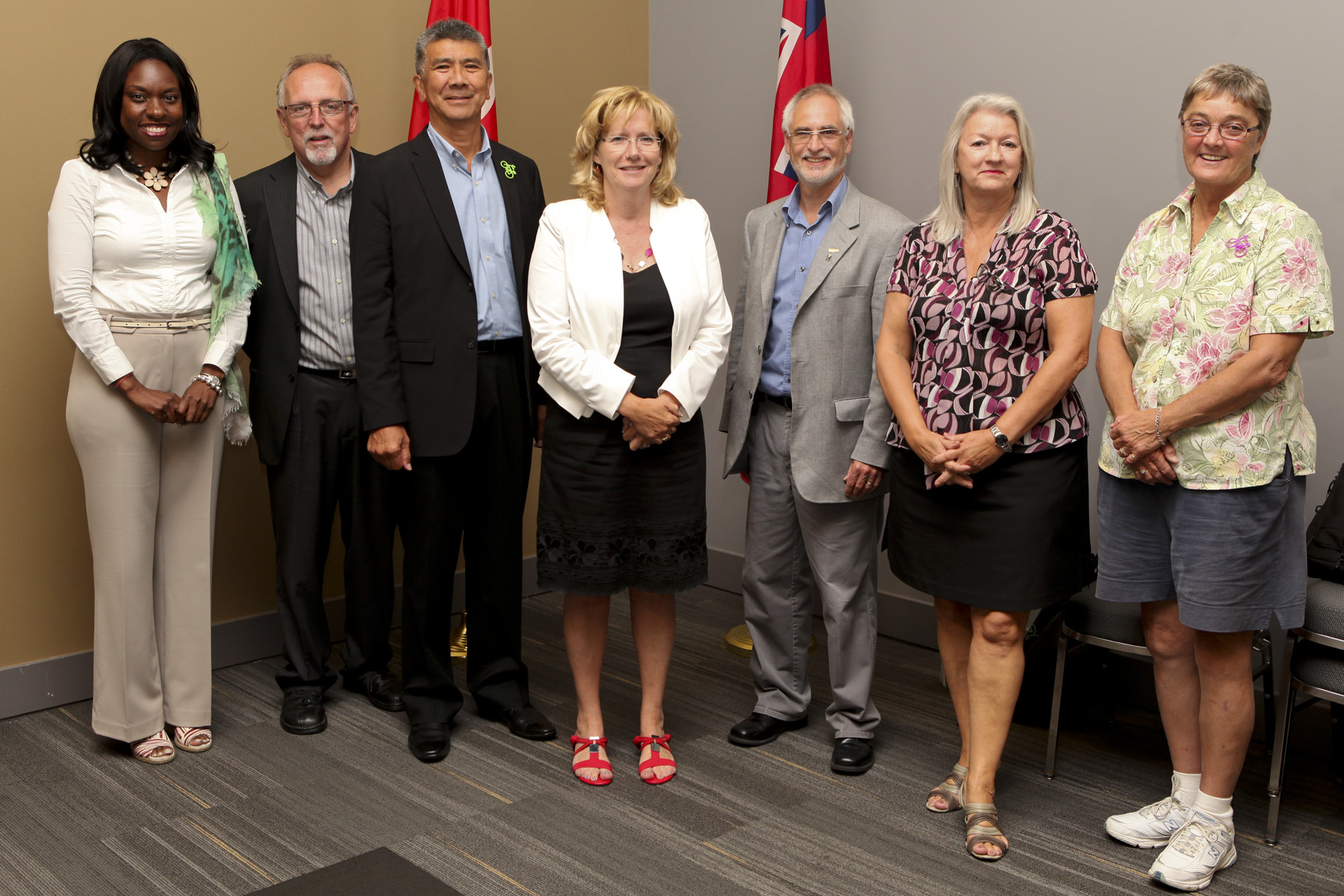
Members of Clarington council with Ontario Municipal Affairs and Housing, 2013.

Elected on October 25, 2010

Position	Name
Mayor	Adrian Foster
Regional Councillor, Wards 1 & 2	Mary Novak
Regional Councillor, Wards 3 & 4	Willie Woo
Local Councillor, Ward 1	Joe Neal
Local Councillor, Ward 2	Ron Hooper
Local Councillor, Ward 3	Corinna Traill
Local Councillor, Ward 4	Wendy Partner

2006–2010 Council
Elected on November 13, 2006

Position	Name
Mayor	Jim Abernethy
Regional Councillor, Wards 1 & 2	Mary Novak
Regional Councillor, Wards 3 & 4	Charlie Trim
Local Councillor, Ward 1	Adrian Foster
Local Councillor, Ward 2	Ron Hooper
Local Councillor, Ward 3	Willie Woo
Local Councillor, Ward 4	Gord Robinson

2003–2006 Council
Elected on November 13, 2006

Position	Name
Mayor	John Mutton
Regional Councillor, Wards 1 & 2	Jim Schell
Regional Councillor, Wards 3 & 4	Charlie Trim
Local Councillor, Ward 1	Adrian Foster
Local Councillor, Ward 2	Don MacArthur
Local Councillor, Ward 3	Pat Pingle
Local Councillor, Ward 4	Gord Robinson

2000–2003 Council

Elected on November 13, 2000

Position	Name
Mayor	John Mutton
Regional Councillor, Wards 1 & 2	Jim Schell
Regional Councillor, Wards 3 & 4	Charlie Trim
Local Councillor, Ward 1	Jane Rowe
Local Councillor, Ward 2	Don MacArthur
Local Councillor, Ward 3	Pat Pingle
Local Councillor, Ward 4	Gord Robinson

1997–2000 Council
Elected on November 10, 1997

Position	Name
Mayor	Diane Hamre
Regional Councillor, Wards 1 & 2	Mary Novak
Regional Councillor, Wards 3 & 4	John Mutton
Local Councillor, Ward 1	Jane Rowe
Local Councillor, Ward 2	Jim Schell
Local Councillor, Ward 3	Troy Young
Local Councillor, Ward 4	Charlie Trim

1994-1997 Council
Elected on November 14, 1994

Position	Name
Mayor	Diane Hamre
Regional & Local Councillor, Ward 1	Larry Hannah
Regional & Local Councillor, Ward 2	John O'Toole
Regional & Local Councillor, Ward 3	Ann Dreslinski
Local Councillor, Ward 1	Mark Novak
Local Councillor, Ward 2	Pat Pingle
Local Councillor, Ward 3	David Scott

=== Town of Newcastle ===
1991–1994 Council

Elected on November 12, 1991

Position	Name
Mayor	Diane Hamre
Regional & Local Councillor, Ward 1	Larry Hannah
Regional & Local Councillor, Ward 2	Ken Hooper
Regional & Local Councillor, Ward 3	Ann Dreslinski
Local Councillor, Ward 1	Mark Novak
Local Councillor, Ward 2	John O'Toole
Local Councillor, Ward 3	David Scott

1988–1991 Council
Elected on November 14, 1988

Position	Name
Mayor	Marie Hubbard
Regional & Local Councillor, Ward 1	Larry Hannah
Regional & Local Councillor, Ward 2	Ken Hooper
Regional & Local Councillor, Ward 3	Diane Hamre
Local Councillor, Ward 1	Arnot Wotten
Local Councillor, Ward 2	Patrick Deegan
Local Councillor, Ward 3	Frank Stapleton

1985–1988 Council
Elected on November 12, 1985

Position	Name
Mayor	John Winters
Regional & Local Councillor, Ward 1	Ann Cowman
Regional & Local Councillor, Ward 2	Marie Hubbard
Regional & Local Councillor, Ward 3	Diane Hamre
Local Councillor, Ward 1	Arnot Wotten
Local Councillor, Ward 2	Hal McKnight
Local Councillor, Ward 3	Frank Stapleton

1982–1985 Council

Elected on November 8, 1982

Position	Name
Mayor	Garnet B. Rickard
Regional & Local Councillor, Ward 1	Ann Cowman
Regional & Local Councillor, Ward 2	Marie Hubbard
Regional & Local Councillor, Ward 3	Diane Hamre
Local Councillor, Ward 1	Bruce Taylor
Local Councillor, Ward 2	Ivan M. Hobbs
Local Councillor, Ward 3	Keith D. Barr

1980–1982 Council
Elected on November 10, 1980

Position	Name
Mayor	Garnet B. Rickard
Regional Councillor, Ward 1	Ann Cowman
Regional Councillor, Ward 2	Marie Hubbard
Regional Councillor, Ward 3	Diane Hamre
Area Councillor, Ward 1	Bruce Taylor
Area Councillor, Ward 2	Maurice Prout
Area Councillor, Ward 3	Ted Woodyard

1978–1980 Council
Elected on November 13, 1978

Position	Name
Mayor	Garnet B. Rickard
Regional Councillor, Ward 1	Ann Cowman
Regional Councillor, Ward 2	Ivan Hobbs
Regional Councillor, Ward 3	Bill Clarke
Area Councillor, Ward 1	Jasper W. Holliday
Area Councillor, Ward 2	Maurice Prout
Area Councillor, Ward 3	Keith Barr

1976–1978 Council
Elected on December 6, 1976

Position	Name
Mayor	Garnet B. Rickard
Regional Councillor, Ward 1	R. Bruce Taylor
Regional Councillor, Ward 2	Robert Dykstra
Regional Councillor, Ward 3	Edward R. Woodyard
Area Councillor, Ward 1	Jasper W. Holliday
Area Councillor, Ward 2	Don Allin
Area Councillor, Ward 3	Alfred Gray

1974–1976 Council
Appointed on January 3, 1974

Position	Name
Mayor	Garnet B. Rickard
Regional Councillor, Ward 1	Bruce Tink
Regional Councillor, Ward 2	Ivan Hobbs
Regional Councillor, Ward 3	Ken Lyall
Area Councillor, Ward 1	Don Wearn (1974–1975); Ann Cowman (1975–1976)
Area Councillor, Ward 2	Don Allin
Area Councillor, Ward 3	Kirk Entwisle

== Mayors ==
=== Clarington (1993–present) ===
No.	Photo	Mayor (Birth–Death)	Terms of office	Took office	Left office	Notes
4		Diane Hamre (1939–2017)	3	December 1, 1991	November 30, 2000	• Newcastle Recreation Complex renamed in her honour, after her death in 2017.
5		John Mutton (b. 1966)	2	December 1, 2000	November 30, 2006	
6		Jim Abernethy (b. 1952)	1	December 1, 2006	November 30, 2010	
7		Adrian Foster (b. 19??)	4	December 1, 2010	Incumbent	• Longest serving mayor of Clarington by time in office, as of 2022.
8		Tom Dingwall	1	November 15, 2026	Incumbent	
