= 2000 Ontario municipal elections =

- November 13, 2000
- Turnout: 41%

Municipal elections were held in Ontario November 13, 2000.

== Elected mayors ==
- Ajax: Steve Parish
- Barrie: Jim Perri
- Belleville: George Zegouras
- Brampton: Susan Fennell
- Brantford: Chris Friel (details)
- Burlington: Robert MacIsaac
- Cambridge: Doug Craig
- Chatham-Kent: Bill Erickson
- Clarington: John Mutton
- Cornwall: Brian Sylvester
- Greater Sudbury: Jim Gordon (details)
- Guelph: Karen Farbridge (details)
- Haldimand County: Lorraine Bergstrand
- Halton Hills: Kathy Gastle
- Hamilton: Bob Wade (details)
- Kawartha Lakes: Art Truax (details)
- Kingston: Isabel Turner
- Kitchener: Carl Zehr
- London: Anne Marie DeCicco
- Markham: Don Cousens
- Mississauga: Hazel McCallion easily defeated a Rod Stewart impersonator with the same name.
- Newmarket: Tom Taylor
- Niagara Falls: Wayne Thomson
- Norfolk County: Rita Kalmbach (details)
- North Bay: Jack Burrows (details)
- Oakville: Ann Mulvale
- Oshawa: Nancy Diamond
- Ottawa: Bob Chiarelli (details)
- Peterborough: Sylvia Sutherland (details)
- Pickering: Wayne Arthurs
- Richmond Hill: William Bell
- Sarnia: Mike Bradley
- Sault Ste. Marie: John Rowswell
- St. Catharines: Tim Rigby (details)
- Thunder Bay: Ken Boshcoff
- Timmins: Jamie Lim
- Toronto: Mel Lastman (details)
- Vaughan: Lorna Jackson (details)
- Waterloo: Lynne Woolstencroft
- Welland: Cindy Forster
- Whitby: Marcel Brunelle
- Windsor: Michael Hurst (details)
