= List of mayors of Clarington =

Municipal post

Mayor of Clarington

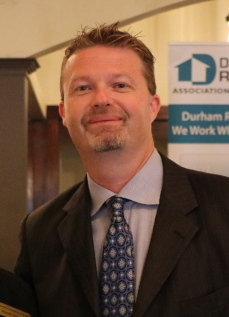
- Incumbent; Tom Dingwall since November 15, 2026
- Style: His Worship; Mayor (informal)
- Member of: Municipal Council
- Reports to: Clarington Municipal Council
- Residence: Clarington
- Seat: Clarington Town Hall
- Appointer: Directly elected by the residents of Clarington
- Term length: 4 years
- Formation: 1974; 52 years ago
- First holder: Garnet Rickard
- Website: www.clarington.net/en/town-hall/Mayor-and-Council.aspx

This is a list of mayors of the municipality of Clarington, Ontario, from its inception in 1974 until the present day. Mayors of townships prior to merger are also listed.

== Townships ==
=== Town of Bowmanville ===
No.	Photo	Mayor (Birth–Death)	Terms of office	Took office	Left office	Notes
1		James McFeeters (1813–1897)	2	1858	1859	
2		Frederic Cubitt	1	1860		
3		James McFeeters	1	1861		
4		George Haines	3	1862	1865	
5		Frederic Cubitt	9	1866	1874	
6		Francis McArthur	1	1875		
7		William Thompson	4	1876	1879	
8		Francis McArthur	4	1880	1883	
9		Robert Lascombe	2	1884	1885	
10		William Horsey	2	1886	1887	
11		Abraham Younie	2	1888	1889	
12		John Galbraith	1	1890		
13		William Allen	13	1890	1902	
14		Moses James	2	1903	1904	
15		Archibald Tait	2	1905	1906	
16		Thomas Spry	2	1907	1908	
17		J. J. Mason	2	1909	1910	
18		John Mitchell	2	1911	1912	
19		Soloman Hillier	3	1913	1915	
20		John Mitchell	3.5	1916	June 1919	
21		Arthur McMillan	0.5	June 2 1919	1919	
22		H. L. Quinn	4	1920	1923	
23		Thomas Holgate (1882–1935)	5	1924	1928	
24		Milton Elliot	3	1929	1931	
25		Geo. W. James	2	1932	1933	
26		Ross Strike	4	1934	1937	
27		Reginald O. Jones	4	1938	1941	
28		Alex Edmondstone	0.5	January 1942	July 1942	
29		C. G. Morris	0.5	July 1942	December 1942	Became acting mayor upon the departure of Alex Edmondstone.
30		Reginald O. Jones	1	1943		
31		C. G. Morris	3	1944	1946	
32		Sidney Little	2	1947	1948	
33		Lawrence C. Mason	3	1949	1951	
34		Sidney Little	1	1952		Elected in 1952.
35		Morley Vanstone	2	1953	1954	Elected in 1953. Acclamation in 1954.
36		Nelson E. Osborne	4	1955	1958	Acclaimed in 1955, 1956, 1957.
37		Wilfred Carruthers (1904–1969)	3	1959	1961	Acclaimed in 1959, 1960
38		Ivan M. Hobbs (1912–1998)	13	1962	1974	Acclaimed

=== Darlington Township ===
No.	Photo	Mayor (Birth–Death)	Terms of office	Took office	Left office	Notes
		Roy W. Nichols	1	1959	1960	
		Garnet B. Rickard (1916–1994)	1	1960	1962	
		A.L. Blanchard	1	1963	1966	
		Harold C. Muir	1	1967	1969	
		Carl Down	1	1970	1972	
		Garnet B. Rickard (1916–1994)	1	1973	1974	

=== Clarke Township ===
No.	Photo	Mayor (Birth–Death)	Terms of office	Took office	Left office	Notes
		James T. Brown	1	1959	1960	
		H. E. Walkey	1	1961	1964	
		John Stone	1	1965	1966	
		Roy A. Foster	1	1967	1969	
		John Stone	1	1970	1972	
		Ed Woodyard	1	1973	1974	

== Municipality (1974–present) ==
=== Town of Newcastle (1974–1993) ===
No.	Photo	Mayor (Birth–Death)	Terms of office	Took office	Left office	Notes
1		Garnet Rickard (1916–1994)	5	January 3, 1974	November 30, 1985	• The Garnet B. Rickard Recreation Complex in Bowmanville, ON is named in his honour.
2		John Winters	1	December 1, 1985	November 30, 1988	
3		Marie Hubbard (1935–2022)	1	December 1, 1988	November 30, 1991	• Served as councillor from 1980 to 1982. • First female mayor of the municipality. • Appointed to the Ontario Municipal Board in 1997, Appointed Interim Chair in 2003.

=== Clarington (1993–present) ===
No.	Photo	Mayor (Birth–Death)	Terms of office	Took office	Left office	Notes
4		Diane Hamre (1939–2017)	3	December 1, 1991	November 30, 2000	• Newcastle Recreation Complex renamed in her honour, after her death in 2017.
5		John Mutton (b. 1966)	2	December 1, 2000	November 30, 2006	Also known as "Mr. X" for his role in Ontario's greenbelt scandal.
6		Jim Abernethy (b. 1952)	1	December 1, 2006	November 30, 2010	
7		Adrian Foster (b. 19??)	4	December 1, 2010	November 15, 2026	• Longest serving mayor of Clarington by time in office.
8		Tom Dingwall	1	November 15, 2026	Incumbent	
