= 2022 Clarington municipal election =

2022 Clarington Mayoral election
← 2018	October 24, 2022	2026 →
- Turnout: 28.05%
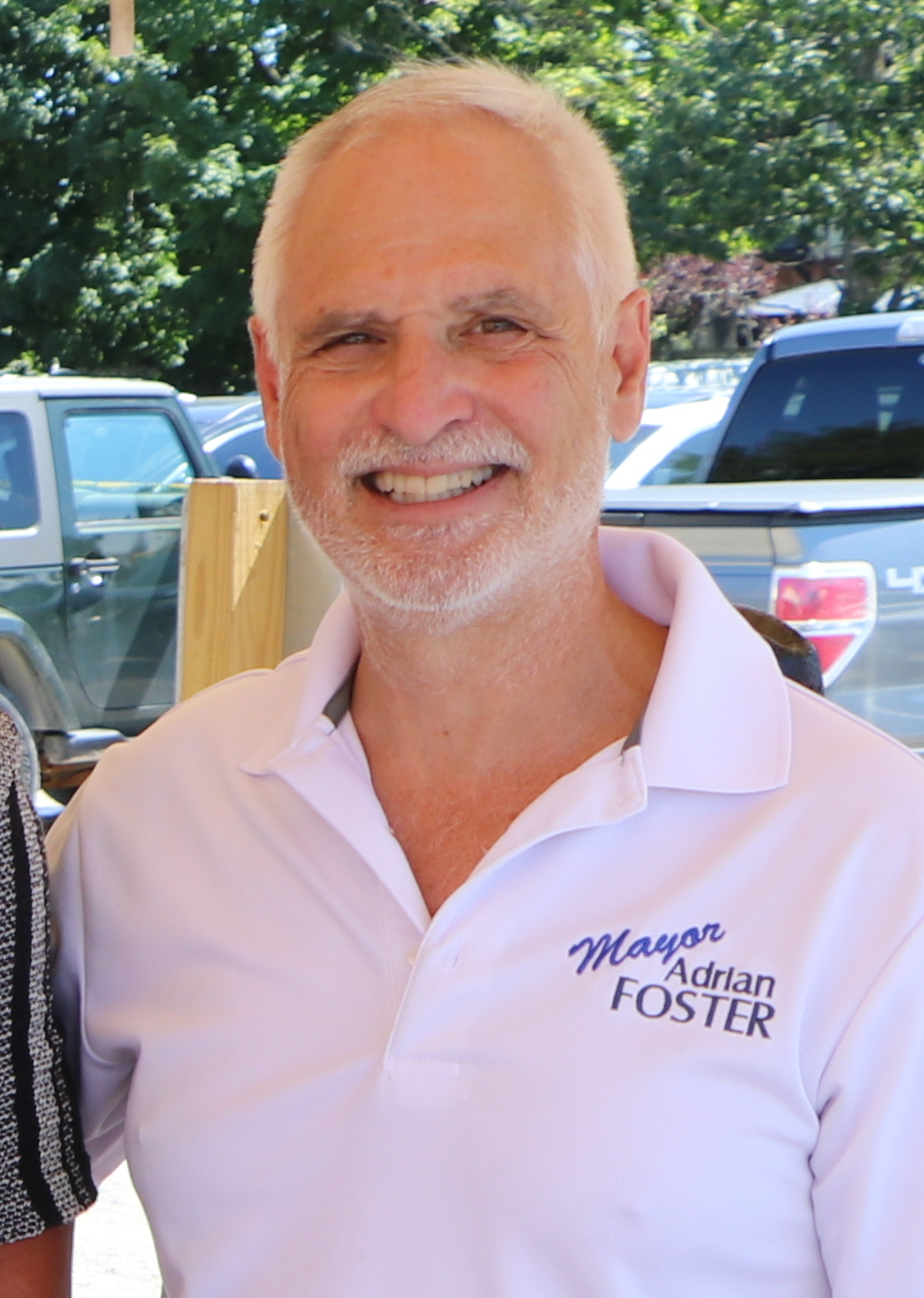

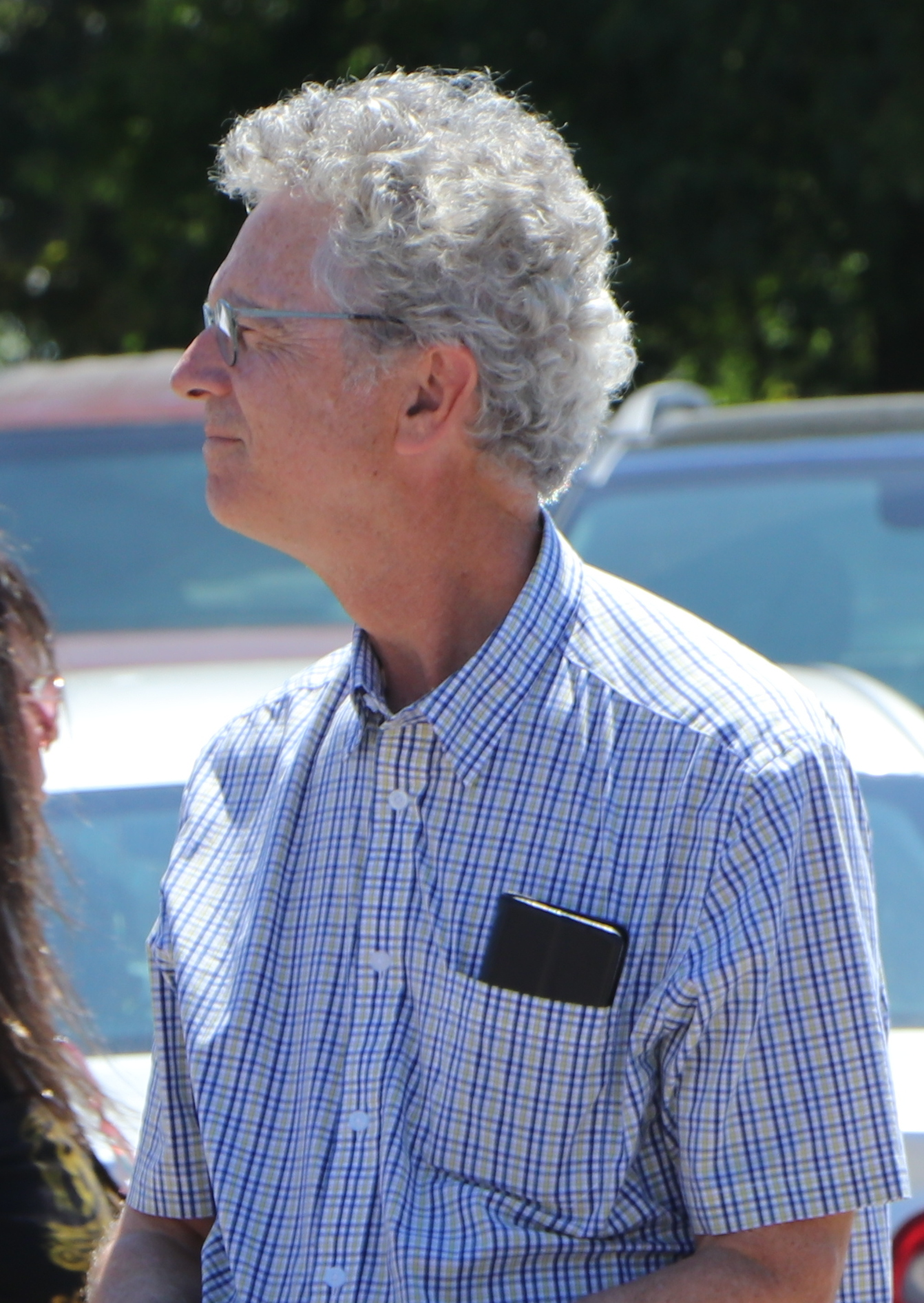

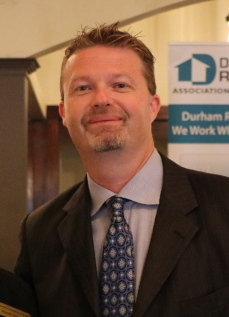
Candidate	Adrian Foster	Joe Neal	Tom Dingwall
Popular vote	8,607	6,053	5,451
Percentage	42.49%	29.88%	26.91%
Mayor before election
Adrian Foster
Elected mayor
Adrian Foster

The 2022 Clarington municipal election was held from Tuesday, October 18–24, 2022, to elect a mayor, local councillors and school trustees to the Clarington Municipal Council in Clarington, Ontario, Canada. 2022 was the first year that Clarington used electronic voting. Adrian Foster, the incumbent mayor was re-elected for his fourth term, with 42% of the vote.

20,606 voters of 73,471 eligible voters (28%) cast a ballot.

== Mayoral election ==
2022 Clarington Mayoral election
Candidate	Votes	%
Adrian Foster (X)	8,607	42.49
Joe Neal	6,053	29.88
Tom Dingwall	5,451	26.91
Mirko Pejic	145	0.72
Total	20,505	100.00
Abstained	249	1.2

== Regional Councillor ==
=== Wards 1 and 2 ===
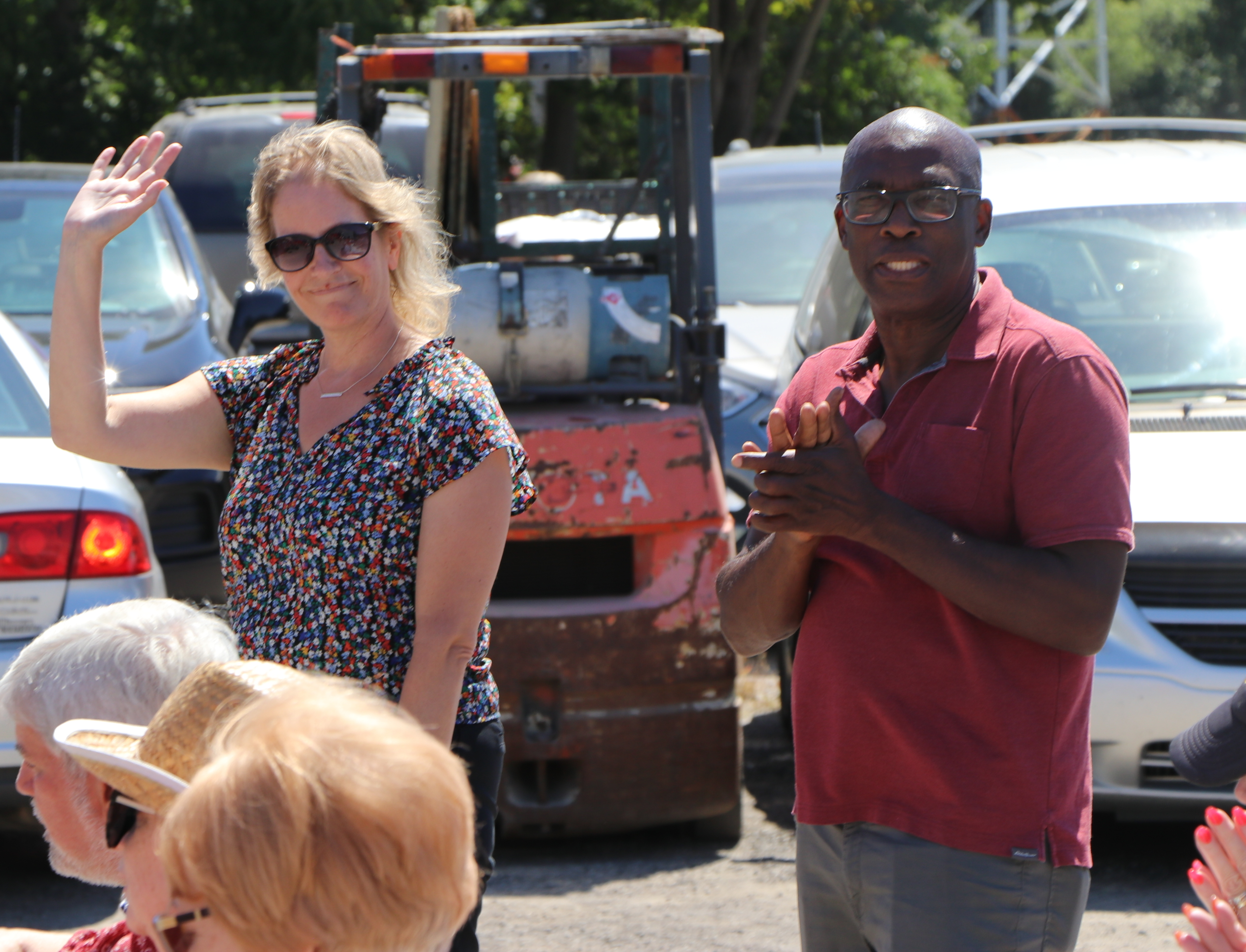
Anderson was elected councillor, winning by less than 150 votes in close race against Jones.

Regional Councillor, Wards 1 and 2
Candidate	Votes	%
Granville Anderson	5,290	44.17
Janice Jones	5,143	42.94
Bernard Sanchez	1,543	12.88
Total	12,403	100.00
Abstained	427	3.4

=== Wards 3 and 4 ===
Regional Councillor, Wards 3 and 4
Candidate	Votes	%
Willie Woo	Acclaimed	

== Local Councillor ==
=== Ward 1 Courtice ===
Local Councillor, Ward 1
Candidate	Votes	%
Sami Elhajjeh	2,800	47.69
Steven Conway	1,391	23.69
Robert Livingstone	1,022	17.41
Larey Reynolds	658	11.21
Total	6442	100.00
Abstained	571	8.9

=== Ward 2 Bowmanville-West ===
Local Councillor, Ward 2
Candidate	Votes	%
Lloyd Rang	2,795	52.27
Ryan Kerr	2,552	47.73
Total	5961	100.00
Abstained	614	10.3

=== Ward 3 Bowmanville-East ===
Local Councillor, Ward 3
Candidate	Votes	%
Corinna Traill (X)	2,115	55.12
Marven Whidden	1,073	27.96
Glenn Baswick	649	16.91
Total	3978	100.00
Abstained	141	3.5

=== Ward 4 Newcastle ===
Local Councillor, Ward 4
Candidate	Votes	%
Margaret Zwart (X)	2,103	52.18
Jim Abernethy	1,581	39.23
Christy Gunaratnam	346	8.59
Total	4124	100.00
Abstained	94	2.3

== Durham Regional Chair ==
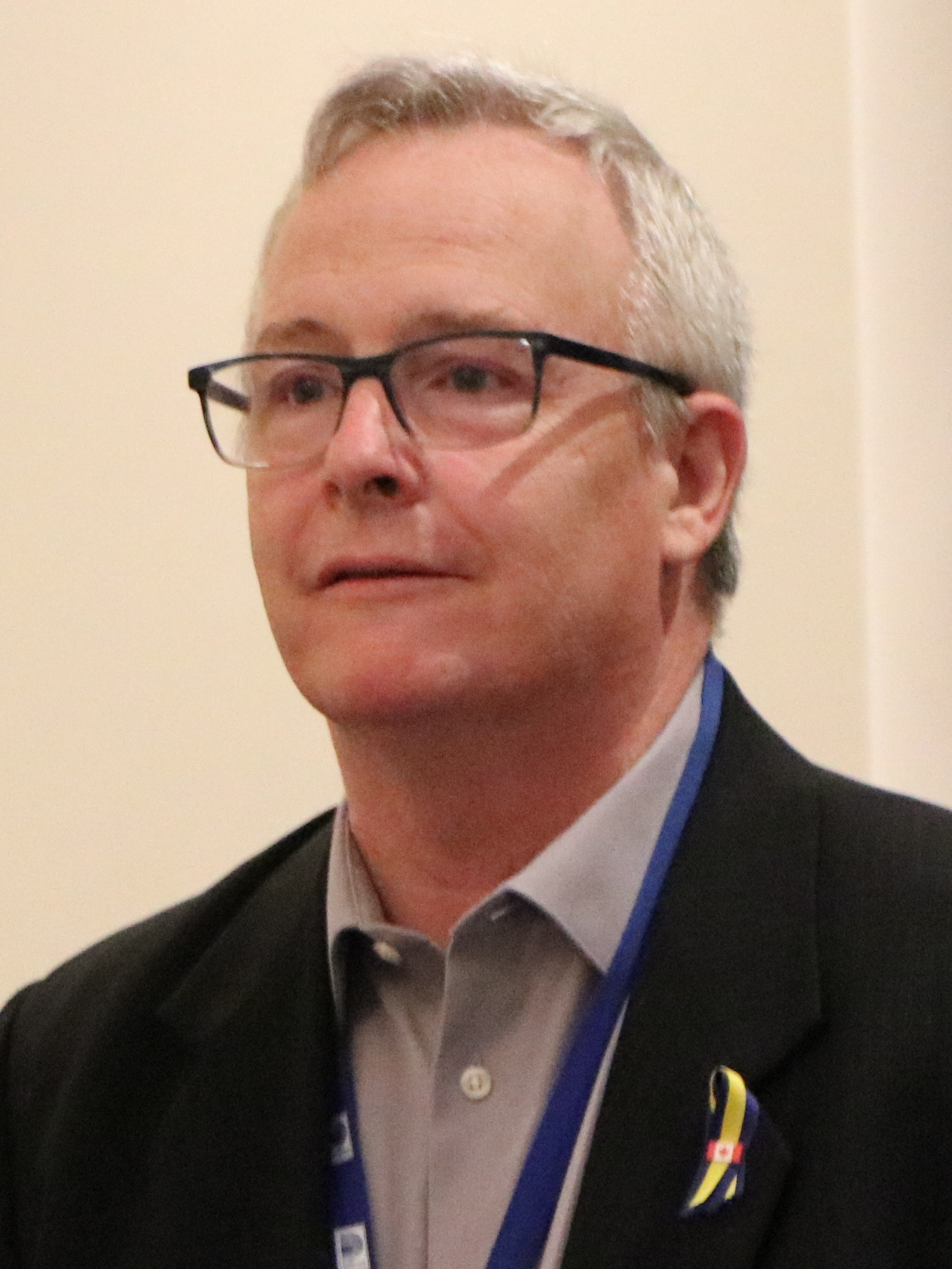
Henry was re-elected with 64.4% of the vote.

Regional Chair, Regional Municipality of Durham
Candidate	Votes	%
John Henry	11,869	64.4
Laurie Blaind Mackie	2938	15.9
Peter Neal	2725	14.8
Kurdil-Telt Patch	901	4.9
Total	20,505	100.00
Abstained	2072	10.1

== School Trustee elections ==
=== Kawartha Pine Ridge District School Board ===
Kawartha Pine Ridge District School Board Trustees
Candidate	Votes	%
Cathy Abraham	8702	25.1
Kathleen Flynn	5919	17.0
Paul Brown	4066	11.7
Michael Barret	3719	10.7
Gail Nyberg	3442	9.9
Tenzin Shomar	3201	9.2
Pranay Gunti	2179	6.3
Terry Rekar	1514	4.4
Kyle Fehr	1083	3.1
Sheikh Hossain	898	2.6
Total	17,281	100.00
Abstained	2971	17.2

=== Peterborough Victoria Northumberland and Clarington Catholic District School Board ===
Peterborough Victoria Northumberland and Clarington Catholic District School Board Trustees
Candidate	Votes	%
Kevin Mackenzie	1558	37.5
Joshua Glover	1363	32.8
Alphonse Ainsworth	1233	29.7
Total	3040	100.00
Abstained	397	13.1

=== Conseil scolaire Viamonde Trustee ===
Conseil scolaire Viamonde Trustee
Candidate	Votes	%
Serge Paul	23	62.2
Kristine Dandavino	14	37.8
Total	46	100.00
Abstained	9	19.6
