= Lindsey Park =

Canadian politician

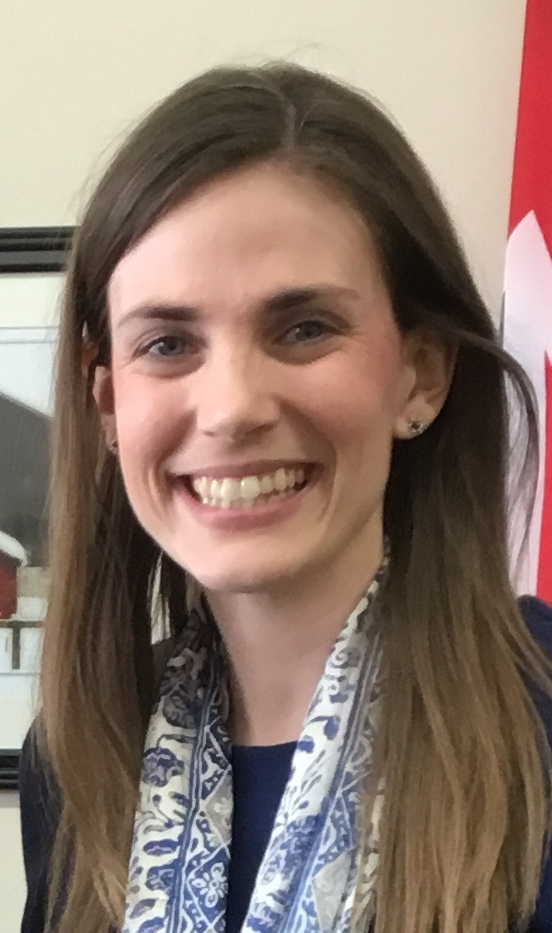
- Park in 2019

Parliamentary Assistant to the Attorney General
- In office June 29, 2018 – October 1, 2021
- Minister: Caroline Mulroney; Doug Downey
- Preceded by: Position established
- Succeeded by: Vacant

Member of the Ontario Provincial Parliament for Durham
- In office June 7, 2018 – May 3, 2022
- Preceded by: Granville Anderson
- Succeeded by: Todd McCarthy

Personal details
- Party: Independent
- Other political affiliations: Progressive Conservative (2017–2021)
- Parent: Jim Park
- Education: Wayne State University, University of Ottawa
- Occupation: Lawyer

Lindsey E. Park is a Canadian politician from Ontario. She was elected to the Legislative Assembly of Ontario in the 2018 provincial election to represent the riding of Durham, initially as a member of the Progressive Conservative Party of Ontario before resigning from the caucus in October 2021. She sat as an independent MPP for the remainder of her term and did not seek re-election in the 2022 election.

== Background ==
Park is the daughter of former professional hockey goalie Jim Park. She grew up in Thornhill, Ontario, and earned a Bachelor of Science at Wayne State University, where she was a goaltender for the NCAA Division I Wayne State Warriors women's ice hockey team, finishing her collegiate career in 2010 as Wayne State's then-all-time leader in career save percentage (.912) and goals-against average. She later studied law at the University of Ottawa, where she got her start in politics working for then-Thornhill MP and Minister of the Environment Peter Kent, and then practiced civil litigation in Durham Region.

== Politics ==
Park was elected to the Legislative Assembly of Ontario as a Progressive Conservative MPP in the 2018 provincial election for the electoral district of Durham on June 7, 2018.

On June 29, 2018, Park was named parliamentary assistant to the attorney general, Caroline Mulroney.

On October 1, 2021, Park was removed from her role as parliamentary assistant to the attorney general after the government house leader Paul Calandra alleged that Park had "misrepresented her vaccination status".

On October 22, 2021, Park released a statement denying Calandra's claim and accusing him of issuing a "false statement". Citing a "breakdown in trust", Park also announced her resignation from the Progressive Conservative Party caucus. Park did not seek re-election in 2022.

Golden Girls Act, 2019

MPP Park’s Golden Girls Act, 2019 advocated for reducing barriers for seniors who want to co-live in a “Golden Girls” style housing arrangement. It passed 2nd reading in the Ontario Legislature with all party support but did not pass into law before the end of the 42nd Parliament.

Support for Nuclear Energy

In 2020, Park introduced a motion that called on the Ontario government to add the next generation of nuclear technology known as Small Modular Reactors to its environment and energy plans and policies. Since the motion passed, the Ontario government has announced they are supporting the building of 4 Small Modular Reactors in the province at the Darlington site.

Strategy to Reduce Loneliness and Social Isolation

Park introduced the Connected Communities Act, 2022 calling on the government to implement a strategy to reduce loneliness and social isolation that would need to be updated every 5 years. This bill passed 2nd reading with all party support but did not pass into law before the end of the 42nd Parliament.

== Electoral record ==
2018 Ontario general election: Durham
Party	Candidate	Votes	%	±%
Progressive Conservative	Lindsey Park	28,575	46.99	+14.38
New Democratic	Joel Usher	19,253	31.66	+3.22
Liberal	Granville Anderson	10,237	16.84	–17.35
Green	Michelle Corbett	2,360	3.88	–0.05
Libertarian	Ryan Robinson	382	0.63	–0.21
Total valid votes		60,807	99.01	
Total rejected, unmarked and declined ballots		609	0.99	–0.83
Turnout		61,416	59.94	+4.23
Eligible voters		102,471		
Progressive Conservative notional gain from Liberal		Swing		+15.87
Source: Elections Ontario
