= 2000 Vaughan municipal election =

The City of Vaughan 2000 Municipal Election took place on 13 November 2000. One mayor, two regional councillors and five local councillors were elected for the city of Vaughan, Ontario, Canada. In addition, local school trustees were elected to the York Region District School Board, York Catholic District School Board, Conseil scolaire de district du Centre-Sud-Ouest and Conseil scolaire de district catholique Centre-Sud. These elections were held in conjunction with all other municipalities across Ontario. (see 2000 Ontario municipal elections).

Following the death of Mayor Lorna Jackson on April 5, 2002, Michael Di Biase was appointed by Vaughan council as interim mayor by virtue of his position as one of two regional councillors representing Vaughan. Gino Rosati, a Vaughan local councillor, was subsequently appointed by Vaughan Council to fill Di Biase’s position as regional councillor and a by-election was held on June 14, 2002 to fill Rosati’s local councillor’s position which was won by Linda Jackson.

== Candidates ==
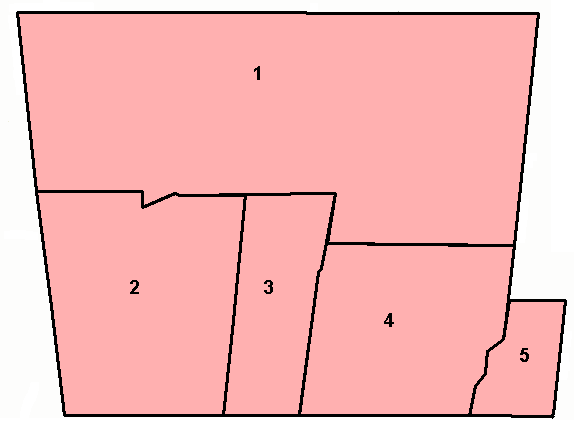
Map of Vaughan's 5 Wards

=== Mayor ===
Candidate	Votes	%
Lorna Jackson (incumbent)	29,616	
Franco E. Cavaliere	8,340	

=== Regional Council ===
Candidate	Votes	%
Michael Di Biase (incumbent)	27,839	
Joyce Frustaglio (incumbent)	23,668	
Phil Aiello	5,222	
Fil Folino	4,743	

Because Michael Di Biase received the highest vote count among the candidates for Regional Councillor, he was styled as the acting Mayor in cases where the Mayor is unavailable. However commonly confused, this is a different role than being the Deputy Mayor

=== Local Council ===
==== Ward 1 ====
Candidate	Votes	%
Mario Ferri (incumbent)	7,571	
Noe Quatela	895	

==== Ward 2 ====
Candidate	Votes	%
Gino Rosati (incumbent)	7,441	
Frank Galati	1,460	
Ernie Cutone	949	

==== Ward 3 ====
Candidate	Votes	%
Bernie DiVona (incumbent)	5,349	
Luigi Vescio	1,728	

==== Ward 4 ====
Candidate	Votes	%
Mario Racco (incumbent)	Acclaimed	

==== Ward 5 ====
Candidate	Votes	%
Susan Kadis (incumbent)	5,164	
Bernie Green	2,103	

==== Ward 2 By-election ====
Held on June 14, 2002

Candidate	Votes	%
Linda Jackson	1,551	23.52
Tony Carella	1,343	20.37
Dino Giuliani	1,137	17.25
Nick Pinto	948	14.38
Marcello Reda	357	5.41
Frances D’Aversa	312	4.73
Andrew Conti	259	4.47
Frank Galati	233	3.53
Rob Falbo	170	2.58
Americo Mazzoli	120	1.82
Claudio Chiappetta	96	1.46
Antonio Azzoli	31	0.47

Preceded by 1997 Vaughan municipal election	List of Vaughan municipal elections	Succeeded by 2003 Vaughan municipal election
