= 2003 Vaughan municipal election =

Municipal election

The City of Vaughan 2003 Municipal Election took place on 10 November 2003. One mayor, three regional councillors and five local councillors have been elected for the city of Vaughan, Ontario, Canada. In addition, local school trustees have been elected to the York Region District School Board, York Catholic District School Board, Conseil scolaire de district du Centre-Sud-Ouest and Conseil scolaire de district catholique Centre-Sud. These elections were held in conjunction with all other municipalities across Ontario. (see 2003 Ontario municipal elections).

Following the resignation of Ward 5 local councillor, Susan Kadis on July 9, 2004, a by-election was held on November 25, 2004.

== Candidates ==
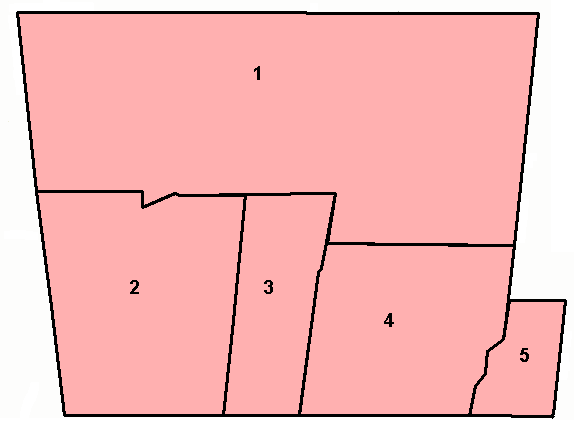
Map of Vaughan's 5 Wards

=== Mayor ===
Candidate	Votes	%
Michael Di Biase(incumbent via appointment)	26,113	62.98
Robert Craig	15,351	37.02

=== Regional Council ===
Candidate	Votes	%
Mario Ferri	20,767	21.07
Linda Jackson	20,368	20.67
Joyce Frustaglio(incumbent)	19,891	10.18
Gino Rosati (incumbent via appointment)	19,349	12.9
Bernie Green	9,719	9.86
Joanna Lionti	8,466	8.59

Because Mario Ferri received the highest vote count among the candidates for Regional Councillor, he was styled as the acting Mayor in cases where the Mayor is unavailable. However commonly confused, this is a different role than being the Deputy Mayor

=== Local Council ===
==== Ward 1 ====
Candidate	Votes	%
Peter Meffe	7,061	63.82
Fabio Gesufatto	2,263	20.45
Ian Holland	1,740	15.73

==== Ward 2 ====
Candidate	Votes	%
Tony Carella	5,693	54.48
Nick Pinto	4,756	45.52

==== Ward 3 ====
Candidate	Votes	%
Bernie DiVona (incumbent)	4,110	64.35
Lou Bruno	1,382	21.64
Paolo Fabrizio	364	5.7
Joseph Bonavota	311	4.87
Anthony Cortese	220	3.44

==== Ward 4 ====
Candidate	Votes	%
Sandra Yeung-Racco	2,315	33.04
Victor Schiralli	1,818	25.95
Ben Steinfeld	1,428	20.38
Erlinda Insigne	976	13.93
Charanjit Singh Mandle	314	4.48
Michael Ricchio	84	1.20
Helen Meszen-Saddler	71	1.01

==== Ward 5 ====
Candidate	Votes	%
Susan Kadis (incumbent)	Acclaimed	

==== Ward 5 By-election ====
Held on November 25, 2004

Candidate	Votes	%
Alan Shefman	1,267	
Bernie Green	947	
David Chapley	784	
Erlinda Insigne	375	
Dina Taub	237	
Yehuda Shahaf	208	
Joshua Katchen	161	
Carlos Laredo	148	
Elliott Silverstein	133	
Elliott Frankl	70	
Russell Korus	57	
Joel Ginsberg	39	
Harold Moskoff	20	

Preceded by 2000 Vaughan municipal election	List of Vaughan municipal elections	Succeeded by 2006 Vaughan municipal election
