= 2026 Durham Region municipal elections =

Municipal elections in Ontario, Canada

Elections were held in the Regional Municipality of Durham in Ontario, on October 26, 2026, in conjunction with municipal elections across the province.

Candidates marked with an (X) indicates they were the incumbent for that position.

== Durham Regional Council ==
Position	Elected
Chair
Kevin Ashe (appointed by provincial government)
Ajax
Mayor	Marilyn Crawford
Regional Councillor, Ward 1	Rob-Tyler Morin
Regional Councillor, Ward 2	Ranjith Paranivasagam
Regional Councillor, Ward 3	Stephanie Ashton
Brock
Mayor	Michael Jubb
Regional Councillor	Peter Frank
Clarington
Mayor	Tom Dingwall
Regional Councillor, Wards 1 & 2	Granville Anderson
Regional Councillor, Wards 3 & 4	Willie Woo
Oshawa
Mayor	Tito-Dante Marimpetri
Regional Councillor, Ward 1	Christopher Biancaniello
Regional Councillor, Ward 2	Cameron Anderson
Regional Councillor, Ward 3	Bob Chapman
Regional Councillor, Ward 4	Jack O'Donnell
Regional Councillor, Ward 5	Brian Charles Nicholson
Pickering
Mayor	Kevin Ashe (Note: As Ashe was appointed Regional Chair, the City of Pickering will appoint another person as Regional Councillor.)
Regional Councillor, Ward 1	Maurice Brenner
Regional Councillor, Ward 2	Linda Cook
Regional Councillor, Ward 3	David Pickles
Scugog
Mayor	Ian McDougall
Regional Councillor	Patricia Conlin
Uxbridge
Mayor	Dave Barton
Regional Councillor	Bruce Garrod
Whitby
Mayor	Elizabeth Roy
Regional Councillor, Ward 1	Rhonda Mulcahy
Regional Councillor, Ward 2	Deidre Newman
Regional Councillor, Ward 3	Niki Lundquist
Regional Councillor, Ward 4	Steve Yamada

== Durham Regional Chair ==
Following the passage of the "Better Regional Governance Act", the provincial government will appoint the chair of the Region. The position had previously been elected by popular vote.

== Ajax ==
Ajax elected 1 mayor, 3 regional councillors in 1 of 3 wards, and 3 local councillors in 1 of 3 wards.

The following are the official results from the Town of Ajax.

=== Mayor ===
2026 Ajax Mayoral election
- October 26, 2026
- Turnout: 32.36% (▲9.88pp)
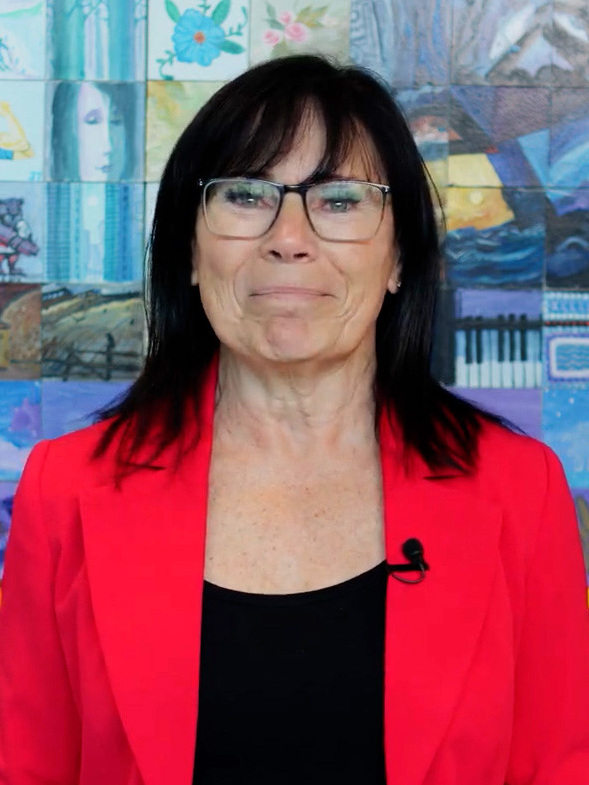
		AK
Candidate	Marilyn Crawford	Ashmeed Khan
Popular vote	19,763	6,615
Percentage	61.02%	20.42%
	RH	CF
Candidate	Richard Hinds	Carion Fenn
Popular vote	3,296	2,242
Percentage	10.18%	6.92%
Mayor before election
Shaun Collier
Elected mayor
Marilyn Crawford

Mayor Shaun Collier will did not run for re-election. Regional councillor Marilyn Crawford won the election, defeating former councillor Ashmeed Khan alongside Carion Fenn, Richard Hinds and Vian Persad.

Candidate	Vote	%
Marilyn Crawford	19,763	61.02
Ashmeed Khan	6,615	20.42
Richard Hinds	3,296	10.18
Carion Fenn	2,242	6.92
Vian Persad	473	1.46

=== Regional Councillors ===
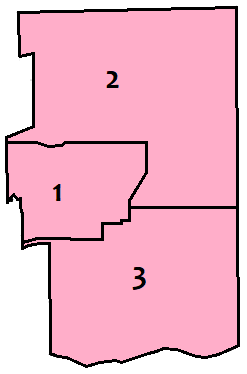
Map of Ajax's three wards

Candidate	Vote	%
Ward 1
Rob Tyler-Morin	5,325	53.06
Stephen Sullivan	2,781	27.71
Aqsa Asif Malik	1,930	19.23
Ward 2
Ranjith Paranivasagam	2,793	24.30
Doug Glass	2,445	21.27
Sterling Lee (X)	2,405	20.92
Muhammad Asif Malik	1,811	15.75
Asad Ali	1,056	9.19
Arthur Augustine	985	8.57
Ward 3
Stephanie Ashton	3,022	29.79
Lynn MacDonald	1,978	19.61
Rob Chopowick	1,819	18.04
Donna Edwards	1,592	15.79
Angie Papas	1,316	13.05
Errol Massiah	358	3.55

=== Local Councillors ===
Candidate	Vote	%
Ward 1
Kristy McDonald	3,362	33.96
Malcolm Andre Barrington	2,771	27.99
Rob Ford	1,354	13.68
Nabeel Ilyas Choudhry	1,226	12.38
Kelly Miller	873	8.82
Jai Shahak	315	3.18
Ward 2
Nancy Henry (X)	4,157	36.49
Andras Adaikkalam	2,718	23.86
Jay Hayles	2,371	20.81
Azhar Khan	2,145	18.83
Ward 3
Nick Papalambropoulos	4,183	41.08
Lisa Patel	3,925	38.54
Muzammil Yazdani	622	6.11
Santosh Gaddam	507	4.98
Bhanuteja Somarouthu	487	4.78
Bosh Bope	459	4.51

== Brock ==
Brock will elect 1 mayor, 1 regional councillor, and 5 local councillors in 1 of 5 wards.

The following are the official results from the Township of Brock.

=== Mayor ===
2026 Brock Mayoral election
- October 26, 2026
- Turnout: 40.50% (▲3.00pp)
	MJ	BT
Candidate	Michael Jubb	Brenda Thyne
Popular vote	3,994	399
Percentage	90.92%	9.08%
Mayor before election
Michael Jubb
Elected mayor
Michael Jubb

Mayor Michael Jubb, who was acclaimed in a 2025 mayoral by-election, won re-election.

Candidate	Vote	%
Michael Jubb (X)	3,994	90.92
Brenda Thyne	399	9.08

=== Regional Councillor ===
Map of Brock's five wards

Candidate	Vote	%
Peter Frank	2,734	63.08
Cria Pettingill (X)	1,600	36.92

=== Local Councillors ===
Candidate	Vote	%
Ward 1
Claire Doble	432	43.86
Beth Josephson	397	40.30
Peter Teolis	85	8.63
John Rush	71	7.21
Ward 2
Diana Vessel	559	81.37
Ron Den Braasem	128	18.63
Ward 3
Mike Samis	383	37.59
Glenda Nicholson	332	32.58
Chris Shier	304	29.83
Ward 4
Sally Morgan	459	57.23
Ronald Hodgson (X)	343	42.77
Ward 5
Ted Smith	415	51.62
Anthony Macoretta	389	48.38

== Clarington ==
Clarington elected 1 mayor, 2 regional councillors in 1 of 2 wards, and 4 local councillors in 1 of 4 wards.

The following are the official results from the Municipality of Clarington.

=== Mayor ===
2026 Clarington Mayoral election
- October 26, 2026
- Turnout: 33.98% (▲4.93pp)
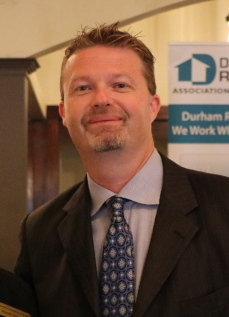

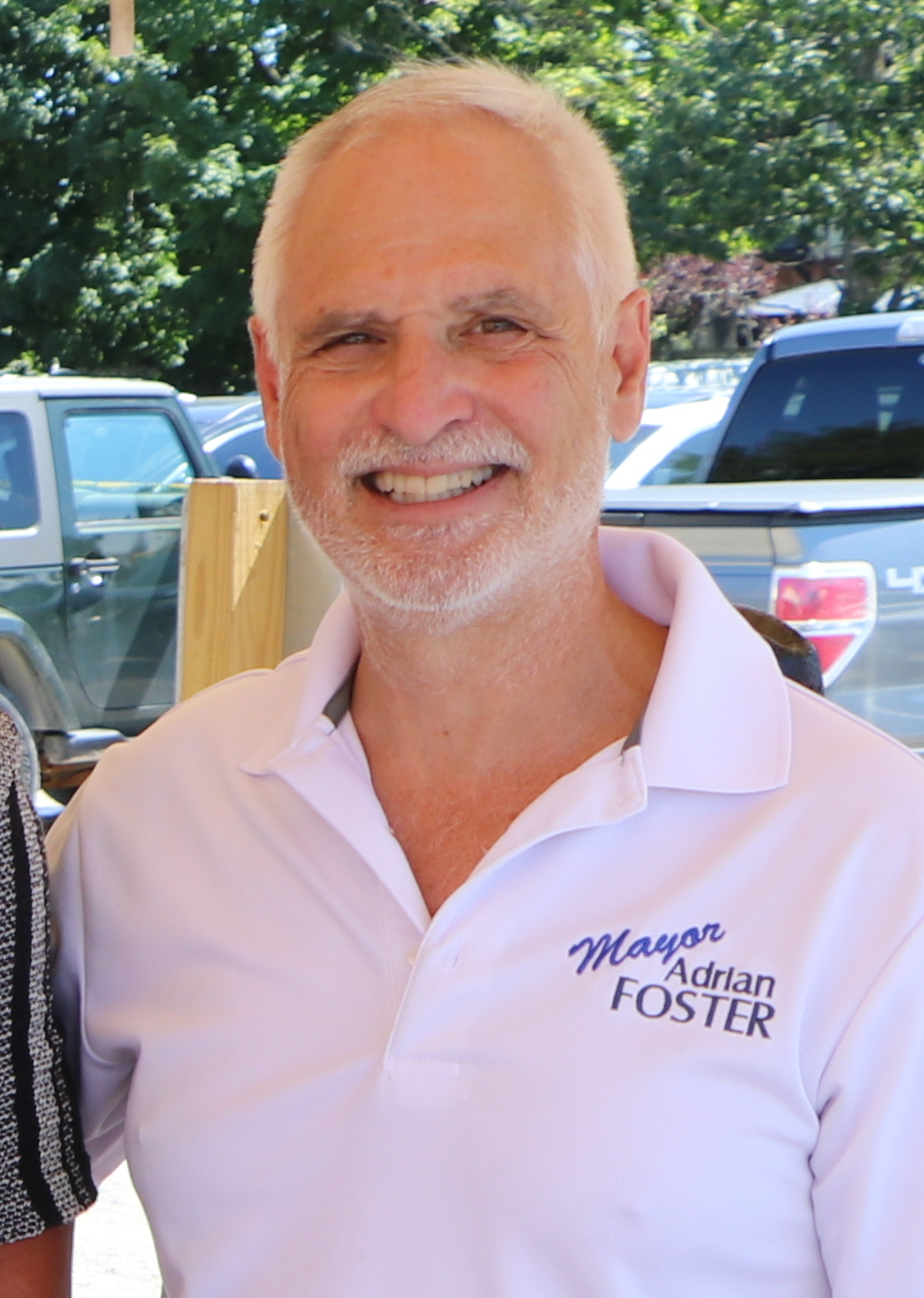
Candidate	Tom Dingwall	Adrian Foster
Popular vote	15,273	13,498
Percentage	53.08%	46.92%
Mayor before election
Adrian Foster
Elected mayor
Tom Dingwall

Incumbent Mayor Adrian Foster lost to retired police officer and 2022 mayoral candidate Tom Dingwall. Clarington elected its first new mayor in 16 years.

Candidate	Vote	%
Tom Dingwall	15,273	53.08
Adrian Foster (X)	13,498	46.92

=== Regional Councillors ===
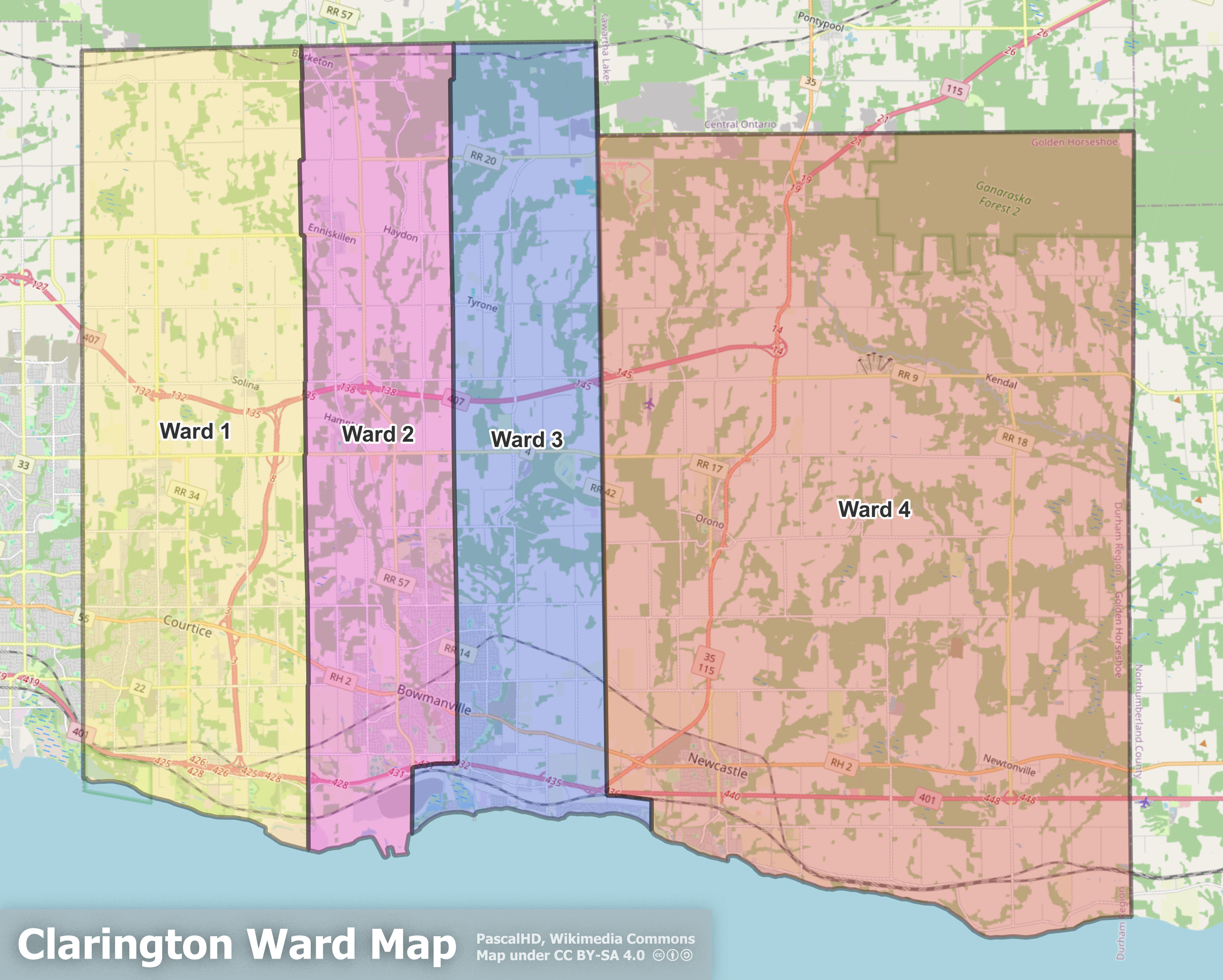
Map of Clarington's four wards

Candidate	Vote	%
Wards 1 & 2
Granville Anderson (X)	8,811	51.72
Melissa Whitefield	8,226	48.28
Wards 3 & 4
Willie Woo (X)	7,420	67.56
Kevin Taylor	2,795	25.45
Kannan Nair	768	6.99

=== Local Councillors ===
Candidate	Vote	%
Ward 1
Joe Neal	4,226	50.05
Sami Elhajjeh (X)	4,218	49.95
Ward 2
Kathleen Flynn	2,947	34.17
Bernard Sanchez	1,664	19.29
Jason Kay	1,603	18.59
Chris Aucoin	1,589	18.43
Joshua Glover	821	9.52
Ward 3
Corinna Traill (X)	2,379	45.50
Kyle Templeton	1,039	19.87
Thomas Zekveld	980	18.74
Mike Mokhtar	831	15.89
Ward 4
Denise Robinson	2,415	43.47
Margaret Zwart (X)	2,247	40.45
Andrew McVey	893	16.08

== Oshawa ==
Oshawa elected 1 mayor, and two city councillors in each of the city's five wards, with one of the two ward councillors also serving on regional council.

The following are the official results from the City of Oshawa.

=== Mayor ===
2026 Oshawa Mayoral election
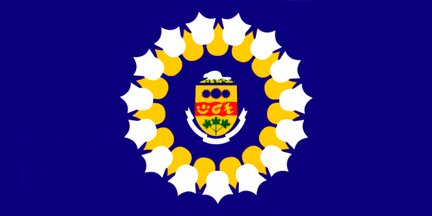
- October 26, 2026
- Turnout: 26.92% (▲8.50pp)
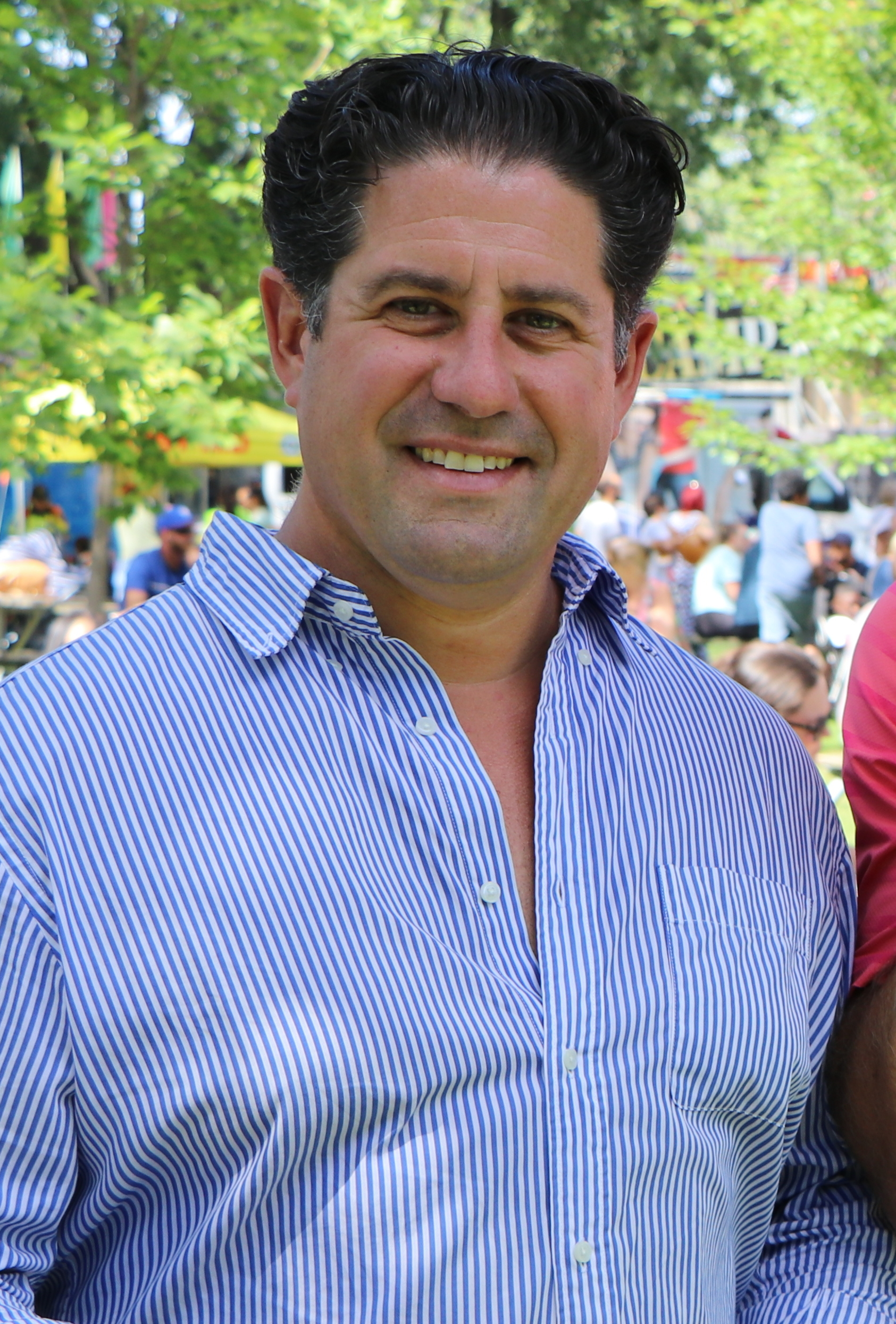

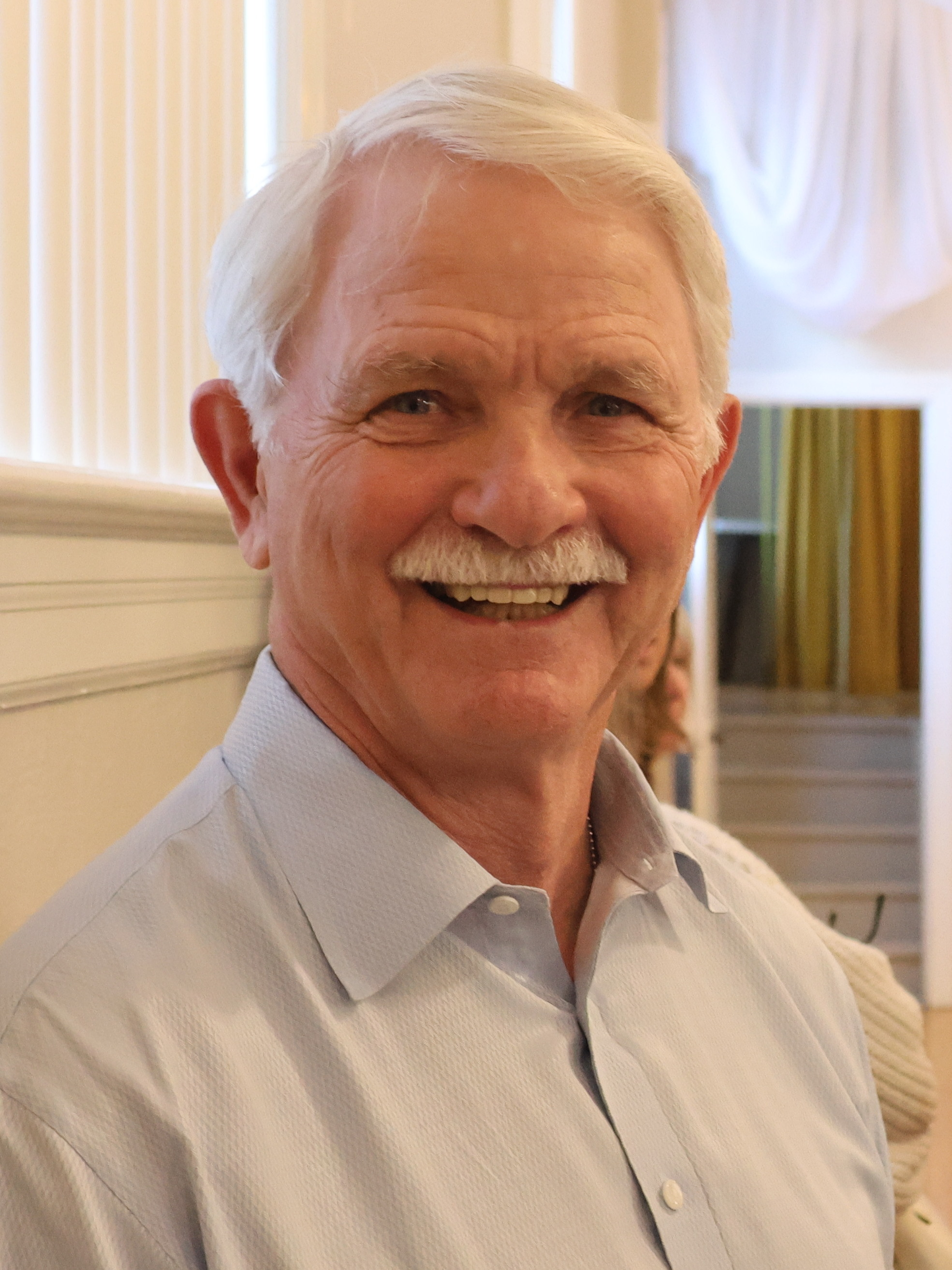

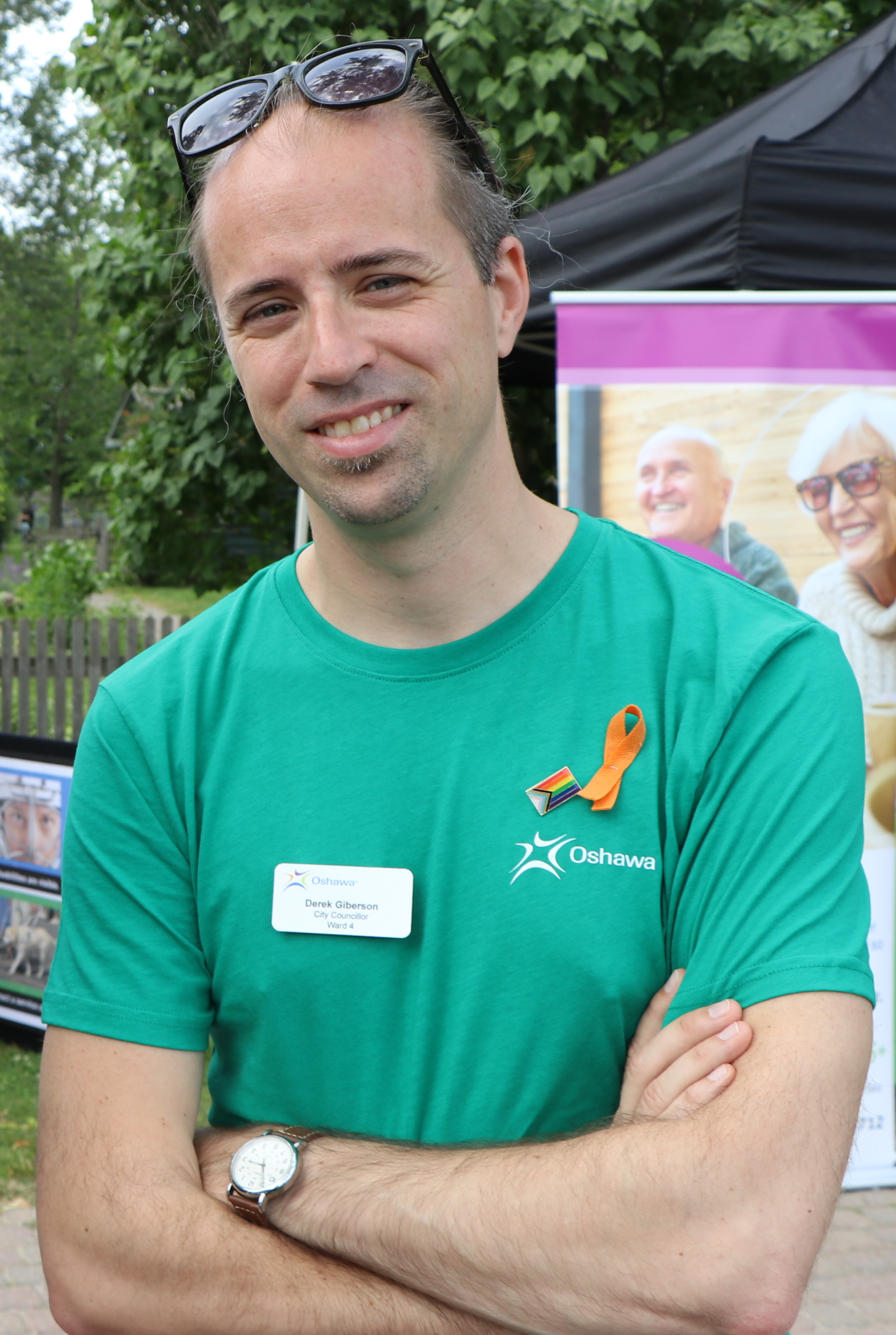
Candidate	Tito-Dante Marimpietri	Jim Lee
Popular vote	15,400	8,939
Percentage	38.26%	22.31%
Candidate	Derek Giberson	Dave Westlake
Popular vote	6,656	5,497
Percentage	16.53%	13.66%
Mayor before election
Dan Carter
Elected mayor
Tito-Dante Marimpietri

Oshawa mayor Dan Carter did not run for re-election. Ward 2 city and regional councillor Tito-Dante Marimpietri won the election, defeating Ward 2 city councillor Jim Lee and Ward 4 city councillor Derek Giberson.

Candidate	Vote	%
Tito-Dante Marimpietri	15,400	38.26
Jim Lee	8,939	22.21
Derek Giberson	6,656	16.53
Dave Westlake	5,497	13.66
Henry Onwuachu	1,714	4.26
Sherland Chhangur	675	1.68
Michael Coons	648	1.61
Jeremy Large	547	1.36
Joseph Tomlins	180	0.45

=== Regional & City Councillors ===
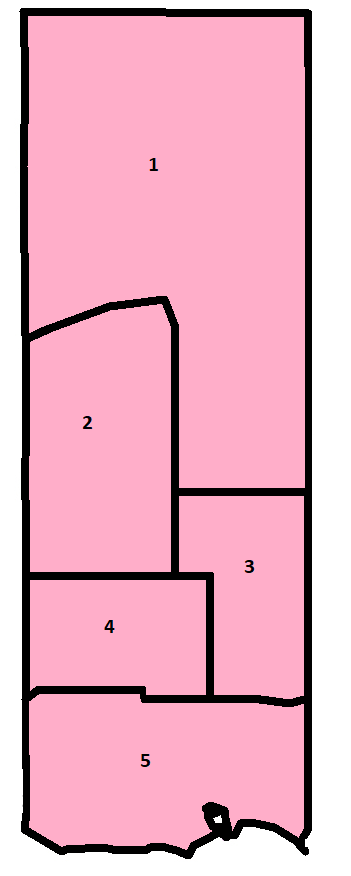
Map of Oshawa's five wards

Candidate	Vote	%
Ward 1
Christopher Biancaniello	1,652	30.75
Martin Franssen	1,634	30.42
Nadea Calrke	1,448	26.95
Selvan Sinnadurai	638	11.88
Ward 2
Cameron Anderson	4,219	54.94
Bradley Marks	3,460	45.06
Ward 3
Bob Chapman (X)	5,262	53.31
Katherine Pollard	3,102	31.43
Timothy Dobson	754	7.64
Rizwan Javed	753	7.63
Ward 4
Jack O'Donnell	3,861	42.16
Rick Kerr (X)	2,216	24.19
Doug Sanders	2,117	23.11
Jeff Davis	965	10.54
Ward 5
Brian Charles Nicholson (X)	3,627	57.37
Kristen McKinnon	2,695	42.63

=== City Councillors ===
Candidate	Vote	%
Ward 1
Rosemary McConkey (X)	3,220	57.99
Omar Wisdom	1,165	20.98
Danjeza Danglli	543	9.78
A. Salam Shinwary	386	6.95
Olaleye Afolabi Oluwaolorunlanke	239	4.30
Ward 2
Jane Hurst	3,115	39.78
Sarah Chiapparro	2,472	31.57
Liam Fraser	1,133	14.47
Avik Bannerjee	792	10.11
John R. E. Sturdy	318	4.06
Ward 3
Roger Bouma	2,912	29.17
Shailene Panylo	2,327	23.31
Matthew Schaffer	1,856	18.59
Sam Howes	1,235	12.37
Sylwia Lesner	1,042	10.44
Rahul Padmini Soumian	336	3.37
Miguel Araujo	275	2.75
Ward 4
Deb Oldfield	1,682	18.41
Domenic Albis	1,575	17.24
Dave Thompson	1,373	15.03
Lisa Freeman	1,355	14.83
Eric Guernsey	1,139	12.47
Theresa Grant	1,053	11.53
Jose Morales	562	6.15
Pauline Mwangi	326	3.57
Edouard Nwaha Gwet	69	0.76
Ward 5
John Gray (X)	3,310	52.37
Christeen Elizabeth Thornton	1,386	21.93
Sid Goyal	629	9.95
Todd Forbes	467	7.39
Adedeji Ibinayo	307	4.86
Scheshawna Lemaire	222	3.51

== Pickering ==
Pickering elected 1 mayor, 3 regional councillors in 1 of 3 wards, and 3 city councillors in 1 of 3 wards.

The following are the official results from the City of Pickering.

=== Mayor ===
2026 Pickering Mayoral election
- October 26, 2026
- Turnout: 39.41% (▲12.17pp)
	KA	LR	JF
Candidate	Kevin Ashe	Lisa Robinson	Janice Frampton
Popular vote	13,038	8,867	4,917
Percentage	36.48%	24.81%	13.76%
- Map showing the winning candidate's vote strength in each of the 3 wards. The wards shaded in Blue voted a plurality for Kevin Ashe. Pie Charts indicate the total votes received by each candidate per Ward.
Mayor before election
Kevin Ashe
Elected mayor
Kevin Ashe

Mayor Kevin Ashe won re-election.

Candidate	Vote	%
Kevin Ashe (X)	13,038	36.48
Lisa Robinson	8,867	24.81
Janice Frampton	4,917	13.76
Doug Cornell	3,479	9.73
Shaun Rickard	3,301	9.25
Zargham Rasool	1,482	4.15
Andrea Wood	654	1.83

=== Regional Councillors ===
Map of Pickering's three wards

Candidate	Vote	%
Ward 1
Maurice Brenner (X)	Acclaimed	
Ward 2
Linda Cook (X)	5,959	50.25
Nancy van Rooy	4,829	40.72
Bushra Rasool	1,071	9.03
Ward 3
David Pickles (X)	4,839	63.18
Azmat Mujeeb	2,820	36.82

=== City Councillors ===
Candidate	Vote	%
Ward 1
James Blair	6,177	39.85
Priya Vadivel	3,360	21.67
Abdullah Mir	3,151	20.33
Jamie Nye	1,227	7.92
Michael Samlalsingh	917	5.92
Jeremy Steinhausen	521	3.36
Zubahir Mohamed	149	0.96
Ward 2
Mara Nagy (X)	3,782	31.41
Sam Snyders	3,073	25.53
John Meloche	2,545	21.14
Stacey Lepine-Fisher	1,559	12.95
Vince Viapiana	1,080	8.97
Ward 3
Shaheen Butt (X)	4,874	64.35
Rajkumar Nada	2,700	35.65

== Scugog ==
Scugog elected 1 mayor, 1 regional councillor, and 5 local councillors in 1 of 5 wards.

The following are the official results from the Township of Scugog.

=== Mayor ===
2026 Scugog Mayoral election
- October 26, 2026
- Turnout: 41.30%
	IM	MC
Candidate	Ian McDougall	Mike Coll
Popular vote	3,326	1,971
Percentage	39.36%	23.33%
	WW	JD
Candidate	Wilma Wotten	Jack Doak
Popular vote	1,673	1,044
Percentage	19.80%	12.36%
Mayor before election
Wilma Wotten
Elected mayor
Ian McDougall

Regional Councillor Ian McDougall won the election, defeating Mike Coll and incumbent Mayor Wilma Wotten.

Candidate	Vote	%
Ian McDougall	3,326	39.36
Mike Coll	1,971	23.33
Wilma Wotten (X)	1,673	19.80
Jack Doak	1,044	12.36
David Whitfield	369	4.37
Charles Deane	67	0.79

=== Regional Councillor ===
Map of Scugog's five wards

Candidate	Vote	%
Patricia Conlin	2,515	30.98
Allan Honey	2,304	28.39
Terry Coyne	2,191	27.00
Richard Park	1,107	13.64

=== Local Councillors ===
Candidate	Vote	%
Ward 1
David Le Roy (X)	1,158	79.75
Scott Blachar	294	20.25
Ward 2
Alisa Cole	1,294	78.76
Richard Hinton	349	21.24
Ward 3
Rosario Greco	383	42.04
Sean Taylor	356	39.08
Don Kett	172	18.88
Ward 4
Brad Martyn	1,192	67.73
Harold Wright (X)	568	32.27
Ward 5
Janna Guido	1,231	49.52
Stephen Kotyk	828	33.31
Marion Meyers	427	17.18

== Uxbridge ==
Uxbridge elected 1 mayor, 1 regional councillor, and 5 local councillors in 1 of 5 wards.

The following are the official results for the Township of Uxbridge.

=== Mayor ===
2026 Uxbridge Mayoral election
- October 26, 2026
- Turnout: 49.37%
	DB	IG	TE
Candidate	Dave Barton	Ian Giffin	Ted Eng
Popular vote	5,861	1,967	1,310
Percentage	64.22%	21.48%	14.30%
Mayor before election
Dave Barton
Elected mayor
Dave Barton

Mayor Dave Barton won re-election.

Candidate	Vote	%
Dave Barton (X)	5,881	64.22
Ian Giffin	1,967	21.48
Ted Eng	1,310	14.30

=== Regional Councillor ===
Map of Uxbridge's five wards

Candidate	Vote	%
Bruce Garrod (X)	6,762	77.49
Jeff Mittman	1,964	22.51

=== Local Councillors ===
Candidate	Vote	%
Ward 1
Pamela Beach (X)	737	43.90
Colin Thacker	516	30.73
Lori Kennedy	328	19.54
Karen Kenyon	64	3.81
Victoria Devenport	34	2.03
Ward 2
Gordon Shreeve (X)	1,311	79.45
Janet Betts	339	20.55
Ward 3
Craig Marlatt	1,162	67.13
Jacquie Hermans	569	32.87
Ward 4
Willie Popp (X)	1,920	81.42
Alex Orr	438	18.58
Ward 5
Christine McKenzie	1,098	76.25
W. David Ward	342	23.75

== Whitby ==
Whitby elected 1 mayor, and two councillors in each of the town's four wards, with one of the two ward councillors also serving on regional council.

The following are the official results for the Town of Whitby.

=== Mayor ===
2026 Whitby Mayoral election
- October 26, 2026
- Turnout: 30.83% (▲7.57pp)
	ER	CL
Candidate	Elizabeth Roy	Chris Leahy
Popular vote	19,177	16,122
Percentage	51.87%	43.60%
Mayor before election
Elizabeth Roy
Elected mayor
Elizabeth Roy

Mayor Elizabeth Roy defeated regional councillor Chris Leahy.

Candidate	Vote	%
Elizabeth Roy (X)	19,177	51.87
Chris Leahy	16,122	43.60
Harshini Rajmohan	1,674	4.53

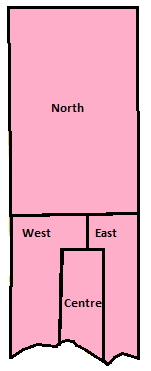
Map of Whitby's four wards

=== Regional Councillors ===
Following a 2025 council vote, Whitby's regional councillors will now be elected by ward, rather than at-large as had been the case in the previous election.

Candidate	Vote	%
Ward 1 North
Rhonda Mulcahy (X)	5,031	61.44
Christine Thatcher	1,803	22.02
Tracy Brown	1,159	14.15
Ikramah Mohhy-Ud-din	196	2.39
Ward 2 West
Deirdre Newman	8,277	74.17
Debbie Lewis	2,883	25.83
Ward 3 Centre
Niki Lundquist	3,749	60.04
Melissa Heckbert	2,495	39.96
Ward 4 East
Steve Yamada (X)	5,867	58.47
Maleeha Shahid (X)	3,762	37.49
Zartasha Zainab Chaudhry	405	4.04

=== Town Councillors ===
Candidate	Vote	%
Ward 1 North
Jay White	3,288	39.93
Steve Lee (X)	2,956	35.90
Anastasia Brown	1,991	24.18
Ward 2 West
Matt Cardwell (X)	3,967	34.21
Judith Tait	3,201	27.61
Lori Lopes	2,127	18.34
Michelle Arseneault	1,237	10.67
Mehmood Kohistani	577	4.98
Yar.M Naeme	486	4.19
Ward 3 Centre
Bob Baker	2,161	34.26
John Rinella	1,113	17.64
Laura McCarney	979	15.52
Scott Templeton	900	14.27
Akuah Frempong	865	13.71
Dave Sansom	290	4.60
Ward 4 East
Victoria Bozinovski (X)	5,771	59.14
Walter Perdigao	2,131	21.84
Saima Hammad	1,358	13.92
Shah Hosein	499	5.11
