= Garnet Rickard =

Former Mayor of the Town of Newcastle

CM Garnet B. Rickard
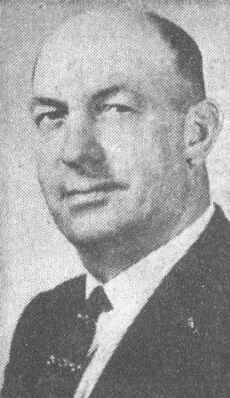
- Rickard, c. 1968

1st Mayor of Town of Newcastle
- In office January 3, 1974 – November 30, 1985
- Preceded by: new position
- Succeeded by: John Winter

Reeve for Darlington Township
- In office January 1, 1960 – January 1, 1963
- Preceded by: Roy W. Nichols
- Succeeded by: A.L. Blanchard
- In office January 1, 1973 – January 1, 1974
- Preceded by: Carl Down
- Succeeded by: position dissolved

Personal details
- Born: 1916 Bowmanville, Ontario
- Died: June 23, 1994 (aged 77–78) Bowmanville, Ontario
- Party: Progressive Conservative (Federal)
- Other political affiliations: Independent (Municipal)
- Spouse(s): Annabelle Erskine Hendry (m. 1941)
- Profession: Agriculture; Politician

Garnet Baker Rickard CM (1916 – June 23, 1994) was a Canadian politician who served as the first mayor of the Town of Newcastle from 1974 to 1985. Garnet was well known for his endeavours in agriculture and would later become a leader in the field, being active in societies and education.

== Personal life ==
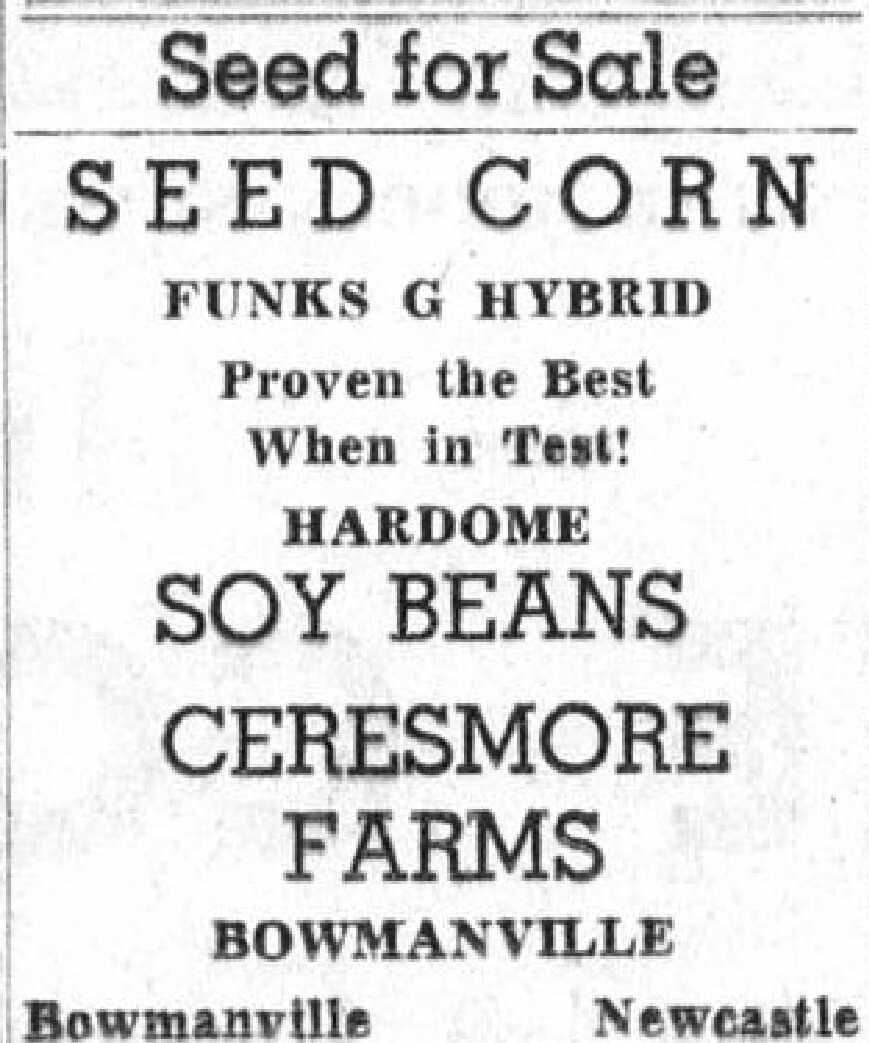
An ad in the Canadian Statesmen for Ceresmore Farms, c. 1966

Rickard was born in 1916 on a 100-acre farm near Bowmanville, Ontario. From a young age, Rickard had interest in seed growing. He began judging seeds for the Junior Farmers' Club. This lead him to establishing a seed-cleaning and fertilizer-blending operation at his farm in 1940. Later that year, he took first place at the CNE in a seed competition at the age of 24. He also received awards for his oats, winning a reserve championship at the Chicago International Show in 1946, and the Royal Winter Fair in 1948.

Rickard was active in several local agriculture organizations, including the Durham County Agricultural Society and the Durham County Federation of Agriculture. He served as president of the Soil and Crop Improvement Association in 1945, and the county association in 1950. With the help of his sons, Jim and Don, they operated the Ceresmore farms, in the Village of Newcastle. They specialized in purebred cattle, pigs, wheat, oats, barley, soybeans, white beans, pumpkins, cash crops and an apple orchard.

He married Annabelle Erskine Hendry, on September 6, 1941, at the United Church, in Newcastle, Ontario.

Rickard was an active Mason. He received the ranks of Worshipful Master (1952), Grand Junior Warden (1968-1969), and member of the Board of General Purposes (1973-1978). He was also active in the Rotary Club of Bowmanville.

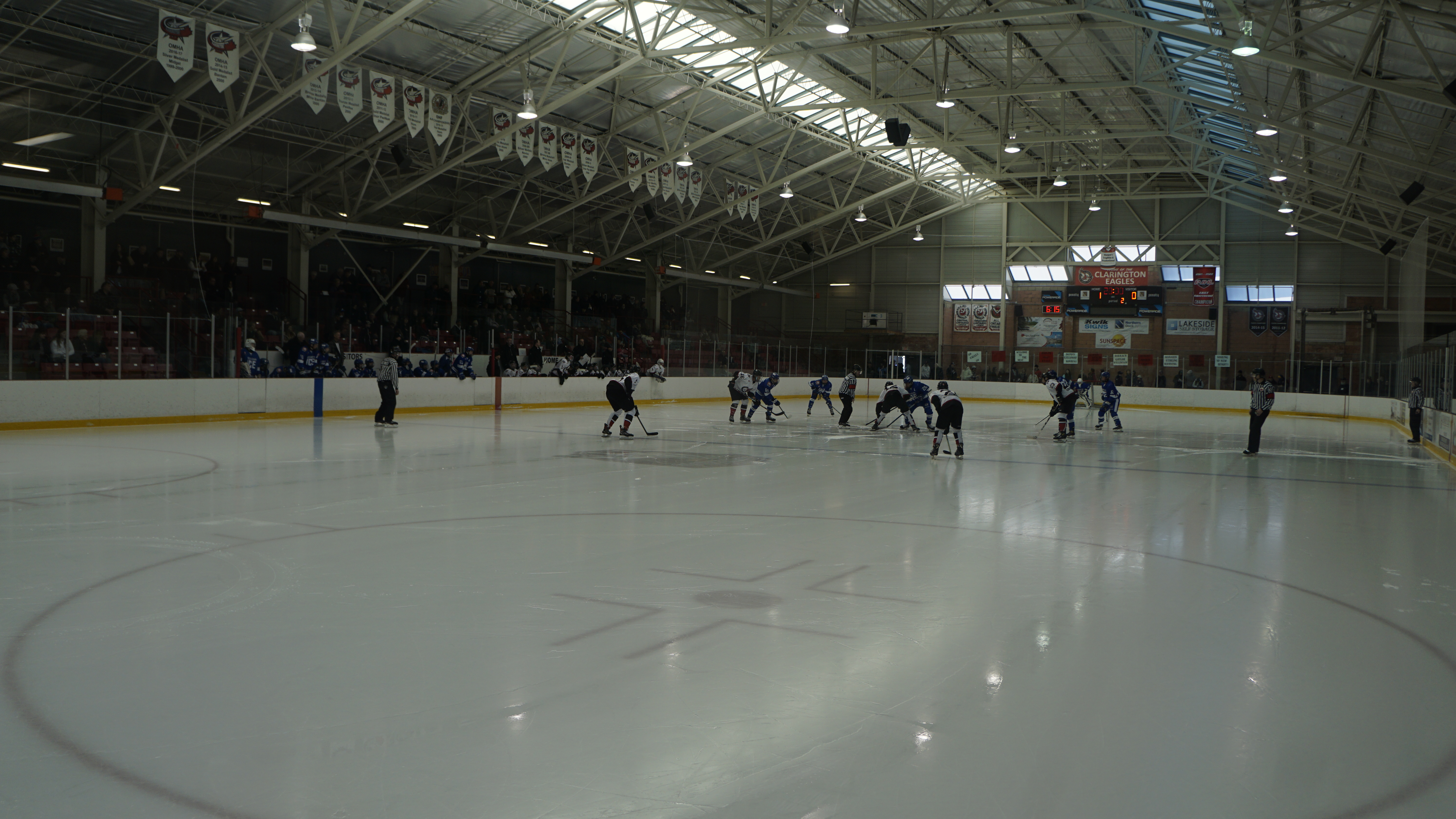
Ice rink at the Garnet B. Rickard Recreation Complex, located in Bowmanville, Ontario.

He was chairman of the Skate '88 committee, a group to raise money for a new recreation Centre in Bowmanville, going on to raise 1.8 million dollars.

Rickard died on June 23, 1994, at the age of 79. Funeral services were held on June 27, 1994 at the Newcastle United Church. The Bowmanville Recreation Complex, which he had helped raise money for, was renamed in his honour in a ceremony held October 28, 1994, to the Garnet B. Rickard Recreation Complex.

== Politics ==
Rickard was first appointed as Darlington councillor in 1949. He was elected as Deputy Reeve of Darlington Township in 1953, winning with 761 votes over 571 against Harold Skinner. In 1957, he ran for the position of Warden for United Counties of Northumberland and Durham. In 1959, he was elected as Reeve for Darlington Township, defeating the incumbent Roy Nichols. Rickard was re-elected by acclamation, in 1960 and 1961. In 1963, he left his position as Reeve to run for Member of Parliament for Durham, but ultimately lost to Russell Honey. He ran again in 1965, but was yet again unsuccessful.

Rickard returned to municipal politics in 1970, when he was elected Deputy Reeve of Darlington Township. In 1972 he was elected Reeve for Darlington Township, defeating the incumbent Carl Down. He held this position for one year, until he was appointed mayor of the newly established township of Town of Newcastle, in January 1974.

On December 20, 1982, he was invested into the Order of Canada. He was appointed to the order on April 20, 1983, by Governor General Ed Schreyer, for his contributions to agriculture.

== Electoral record ==
Town of Newcastle Mayoral Election (1982)
Candidate	Votes	%
Garnet Rickard	5700	50.6
Harry Wade	4255	37.8
Thomas Vanderende	1292	11.4

Town of Newcastle Mayoral Election (1980)
Candidate	Votes	%
Garnet Rickard	5031	53.9
Bill Hulsman	4290	46.0

Town of Newcastle Mayoral Election (1978)
Candidate	Votes	%
Garnet Rickard	6657	58.6
Robert Dykstra	4693	41.3

Town of Newcastle Mayoral Election (1976)
Candidate	Votes	%
Garnet Rickard	5771	61.3
Kenneth Lyall	3643	38.7

Darlington Township Reeve Election (1972)
Candidate	Votes	%
Garnet Rickard	1096	53.91
Carl Down	937	46.09

Darlington Township Deputy Reeve Election (1970)
Candidate	Votes	%
Garnet Rickard	955	68.85
Richard Gibbs	432	31.15

1965 Canadian federal election: Durham
Party	Candidate	Votes	%	±%}
Liberal	Russell Honey	8,017	42.49	-3.73
Progressive Conservative	Garnet Rickard	6,725	35.64	-7.21
New Democratic	John Anthony Cheyne Ketchum	3,948	20.93	+10.85
Social Credit	Wilbur N. Grandall	177	0.94	+0.08
Liberal hold		Swing		+1.74

1963 Canadian federal election: Durham
Party	Candidate	Votes	%	±%}
Liberal	Russell Honey	8,720	46.22	+2.06
Progressive Conservative	Garnet Rickard	8,084	42.85	+0.17
New Democratic	Eileen Ethel Coutts	1,901	10.08	-2.21
Social Credit	Wilbur N. Crandall	161	0.85	-0.02

Darlington Township Reeve Election (1959)
Candidate	Votes	%
Garnet Rickard	1510	63.87
Roy W. Nichols	854	36.13
