= Adrian Foster (politician) =

7th mayor of Clarington

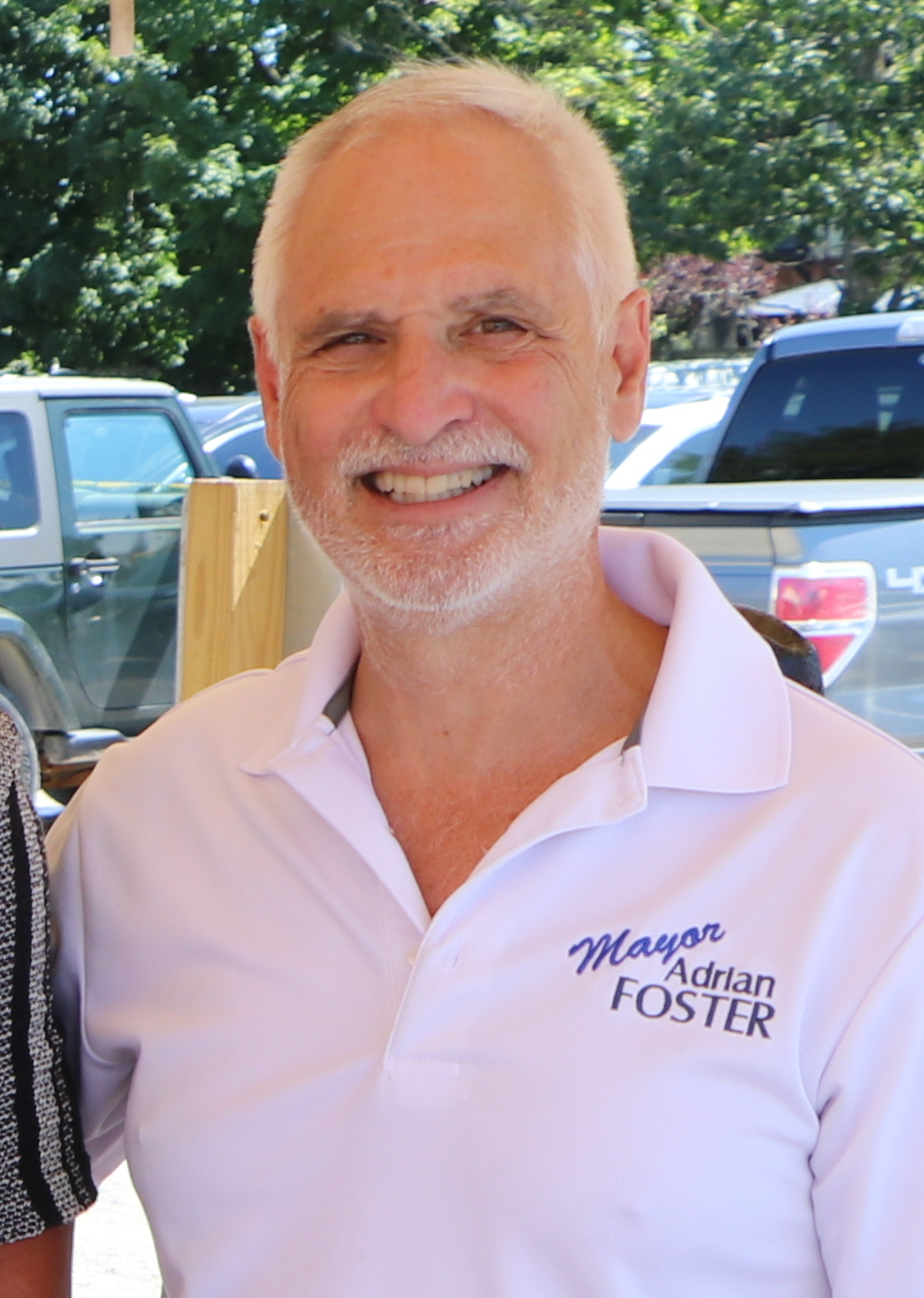
- Foster in 2022

7th Mayor of Clarington
- In office December 1, 2010 – November 15, 2026
- Preceded by: Jim Abernethy
- Succeeded by: Tom Dingwall

Clarington Municipal Councillor for Ward 1
- In office December 1, 2003 – December 1, 2010
- Preceded by: Jane Rowe
- Succeeded by: Joe Neal
- Constituency: Ward 1

Personal details
- Party: Independent
- Spouse: Deborah Foster
- Education: University of Toronto (BA)
- Profession: Politician; investment advisor
- Website: Mayor's profile

Adrian Foster is a Canadian politician who served as the 7th mayor of Clarington from 2010 to 2026. As mayor, he also sat on Durham Regional Council.

== Education ==
Foster was educated at the Scarborough campus of the University of Toronto, where he studied psychology and French, and received a Bachelors of Arts degree in 1983. After graduating, he worked as a counsellor for developmentally disabled children and their families. He then worked as an investment advisor for 26 years. He also served as the President of the Clarington Board of Trade. He was awarded with the Queen Elizabeth II Golden Jubilee Medal in 2002 and the Queen Elizabeth II Diamond Jubilee Medal in 2012.

== Political career ==
Foster first entered politics upon being elected to Clarington's municipal council in 2003, defeating Suzanne Elston by just over 200 votes in Ward 1. He was re-elected to council in 2006, winning two-thirds of the vote against Oudit Rai. He ran on the need for a "central defining feature" for the ward's main community of Courtice, and the need to "get a handle on the planning of the Highway 2 corridor".

Foster was first elected as Clarington's mayor in the 2010 municipal elections, defeating incumbent mayor Jim Abernethy by fewer than 900 votes, in a close three-way race. He campaigned promising "working together for a change", and his number one priority was preventing the construction of a garbage incinerator in the municipality. He was re-elected in 2014 in a close race against former Progressive Conservative MPP John O'Toole, the father of future Conservative Party leader Erin O'Toole. Foster's priorities in 2014 included expanding GO Transit, job creation, bettering quality of life, and developing deeper relationships with other levels of government. Foster was easily re-elected for a third term in 2018, winning over two-thirds of the vote against Mark Canning. His priorities have been trying to extend the GO Train to the municipality, renovating Lakeridge Health Bowmanville and building a hospice in Newcastle. In 2022, he was re-elected for his fourth term, with 42% of the vote. As of 2022, Foster is the longest serving Mayor of Clarington, surpassing 12 years in office.

As mayor, he has sat as the chair of Durham Region Finance, and as the Chair of the Canadian Association of Nuclear Host Communities. During his time as mayor, he has led the municipality though rapid growth.

Foster endorsed the Ontario Progressive Conservative Party in the 2025 Ontario general election.

Foster lost re-election to retired police officer and 2022 candidate Tom Dingwall in the 2026 municipal elections.

== Personal life ==
Foster's wife, Deborah is an ordained United Church of Canada minister.

== Electoral record ==
Mayor, Municipality of Clarington (2026)
Candidate	Votes	%
Tom Dingwall	15,273	53.1
Adrian Foster	13,498	46.9

Mayor, Municipality of Clarington (2022)
Candidate	Votes	%
Adrian Foster	8607	42.5
Joe Neal	6053	29.9
Tom Dingwall	5451	26.9
Mirko Pejic	145	0.7

Mayor, Municipality of Clarington (2018)
Candidate	Votes	%
Adrian Foster	12,507	68.06
Mark Canning	5,259	28.62
Matthew Marshall	610	3.32

Mayor, Municipality of Clarington (2014)
Candidate	Votes	%
Adrian Foster	10,093	53.62
John O'Toole	8,731	46.38

Mayor, Municipality of Clarington (2010)
Candidate	Votes	%
Adrian Foster	6,905	35.51
Jim Abernethy	6,135	31.55
Paul Adams	5,740	29.52
Jeremy Woodcock	664	3.42

Local Councillor - Ward 1, Municipality of Clarington (2006)
Candidate	Votes	%
Adrian Foster	3,978	66.68
Oudit Rai	1,988	33.32

Local Councillor - Ward 1, Municipality of Clarington (2003)
Candidate	Votes	%
Adrian Foster	1,411	27.85
Suzanne Elston	1,202	23.73
Jim Vinson	1,190	23.49
Oudit Rai	1,073	21.18
Gail Syme	190	3.75
