= John Mutton (Canadian politician) =

Canadian politician and consultant

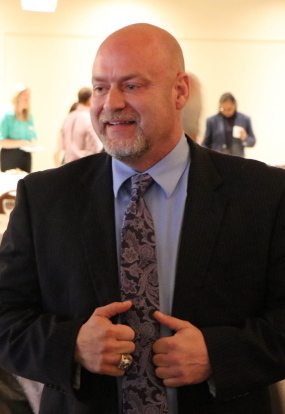
- Mutton in 2018

5th Mayor of Clarington
- In office December 1, 2000 – November 30, 2006
- Preceded by: Diane Hamre
- Succeeded by: Jim Abernethy

Clarington Regional Councillor for Ward 4
- In office December 1, 1997 – November 30, 2000

John William Mutton (born c. 1966) is a Canadian consultant, former municipal politician, and athlete. He served as Mayor of Clarington from 2000 to 2006 and was identified in 2023 as "Mr. X" in Ontario’s Greenbelt scandal, which led to a two‑year lobbying ban issued in 2025.

== Early life and athletic background ==
Mutton was born in 1966 and raised in Bowmanville, Ontario. His father, Ronald John Mutton (1939–2022), operated a local service station and was involved in motorsports activities at Mosport.

Mutton has competed in Brazilian Jiu‑Jitsu (BJJ), participating in various master‑level tournaments. He holds a blue belt and represents Oshawa BJJ.

== Political career ==
=== Regional Councillor (1997–2000) ===
Mutton served as Regional Councillor for Ward 4 in the Municipality of Clarington from 1997 to 2000.

=== Mayor of Clarington (2000–2006) ===
Mutton was elected Mayor of Clarington in 2000 and re‑elected in 2003.

== Post‑mayoral career ==
=== Municipal Solutions ===
In 2006, Mutton founded Municipal Solutions, a consulting firm based in Oshawa, Ontario. The company provides advisory services to municipalities and development‑sector clients.

=== 2018 Durham Regional Chair campaign ===
In the 2018 municipal election, Mutton ran for the position of Durham Regional Chair. He campaigned on infrastructure and service delivery, and participated in local debates. He placed third with 13.23% of the vote.

== Greenbelt lobbying investigation ==
In August 2023, Ontario's Integrity Commissioner released a report about an unnamed lobbyist - referred to as "Mr. X" - who had allegedly lobbied to remove protected lands from the Greenbelt without registering under Ontario’s Lobbyists Registration Act.

Media investigations subsequently identified "Mr. X" as John Mutton.

The Queen’s Park Observer further described him as “the Maserati-driving, jiu jitsu-fighting former mayor of Clarington,” and reported that sources confirmed the two-year lobbying ban was imminent as of mid-April 2025.

In April 2025, the Integrity Commissioner imposed the two-year ban on Mutton’s lobbying activities, effective until April 2027.

== Commentary and public activity ==
In 2008, Mutton published a letter criticizing then‑Clarington Mayor Jim Abernethy for alleged violations of the Municipal Act, citing procedural concerns and conflict‑of‑interest issues.

In 2022, Mutton appeared alongside Harley Guindon at an April campaign event for PC MPP David Piccini. According to PressProgress, Guindon has “documented ties” to the Hells Angels and Satan’s Choice, and credited Mutton with introducing him to “the moguls of politics, media, marketing, franchise owners, billionaire developers, producers and much more.”

Local media also noted the trio’s public appearance together. InSauga reported that Piccini was “endorsed by Hells Angels, Satan’s Choice affiliated Oshawa businessman” in a story referencing Guindon and Mutton.

In 2024, Mutton voiced criticism of a municipal recreation centre proposal in Bowmanville, arguing the cost outweighed projected benefits.

In June 2025, he demanded an apology from Clarington Mayor Adrian Foster following public allegations linking Mutton to a leaked confidential council document.

== Personal life ==
Mutton is married to Ana Condic, a business partner at Municipal Solutions. He has two daughters from a previous marriage. One of his daughters, Janine Mocaiber (née Mutton), is a Brazilian Jiu‑Jitsu black belt and instructor.

=== Assault allegations ===
In 2006, Mutton was charged with assault in connection with an incident involving his then-wife and their daughter. The case went to trial in October 2007, where his daughter testified that he had not intended to cause harm. His then-wife also recanted key elements of her earlier statement. The court found insufficient evidence to convict and acquitted Mutton of all charges.

Following the trial, Mutton stated that the charges were the result of a “malicious prosecution” and emphasized that he had “always maintained his innocence.”

More than a decade later, during the 2018 Durham Regional Chair election campaign, the case re-entered public discourse when his ex-wife, Jennifer Lane, posted renewed allegations on Facebook. In response, Mutton described the revival of the accusations as politically motivated “mud-slinging” and reiterated that the matter had been resolved in court.

== See also ==
- Greenbelt scandal
- Clarington
- Durham Region
