= 2000 Kawartha Lakes municipal election =

The 2000 Kawartha Lakes municipal election was held on November 13, 2000, to elect a mayor, councillors, and school trustees in the city of Kawartha Lakes, Ontario, Canada.

== Results ==
2000 Kawartha Lakes election, Mayor of Kawartha Lakes
Candidate	Total votes	% of total votes
Art Truax	10,982	35.14
Joe McGuire	9,354	29.93
John Macklem	5,964	19.08
Greg Lewis	3,235	10.35
Art Field	1,718	5.50
Total valid votes	31,253	100.00

2000 Kawartha Lakes election, Councillor, Ward One
Candidate	Total votes	% of total votes
Lloyd Robertson	1,215	66.10
Ross Radway	553	30.09
Tommy Thompson	70	3.81
Total valid votes	1,838	100.00

2000 Kawartha Lakes election, Councillor, Ward Two
Candidate	Total votes	% of total votes
Andy Luff	713	41.05
Fred Brecht	488	28.09
Ken Diebel	305	17.56
Peter White	231	13.30
Total valid votes	1,737	100.00

2000 Kawartha Lakes election, Councillor, Ward Three
Candidate	Total votes	% of total votes
John Huke	718	41.29
Jack MacDonald	356	20.47
John Byrne	238	13.69
Noni Campbell	236	13.57
Audrey Thrasher	175	10.06
Egils Dukers	16	0.92
Total valid votes	1,739	100.00

2000 Kawartha Lakes election, Councillor, Ward Four
Candidate	Total votes	% of total votes
Wayne Teel	522	24.42
Don Money	481	22.50
Barb Kelly	439	20.53
Tom Thomson	346	16.18
George Davidson	215	10.06
Rae Fleming	135	6.31
Total valid votes	2,138	100.00

2000 Kawartha Lakes election, Councillor, Ward Five
Candidate	Total votes	% of total votes
Faye McGee	978	50.23
Elizabeth Luzak	818	42.01
Lucy Lizotte	151	7.76
Total valid votes	1,947	100.00

2000 Kawartha Lakes election, Councillor, Ward Six
Candidate	Total votes	% of total votes
Sandra Barrett	977	41.91
Carl Quaranto	472	20.25
Roger Bellwood	367	15.74
Al Breedon	367	15.74
Dave Thibault	78	3.35
Bob Somers	70	3.00
Total valid votes	2,331	100.00

2000 Kawartha Lakes election, Councillor, Ward Seven
Candidate	Total votes	% of total votes
Cliff White	928	57.35
Andy Millar	690	42.65
Total valid votes	1,618	100.00

2000 Kawartha Lakes election, Councillor, Ward Eight
Candidate	Total votes	% of total votes
Donna Villemaire	620	31.11
Annie Hall	433	21.73
Gary Marquis	331	16.61
Ruth Lyons	326	16.36
Clifford Eige	190	9.53
Charles Olito	93	4.67
Total valid votes	1,993	100.00

2000 Kawartha Lakes election, Councillor, Ward Nine
Candidate	Total votes	% of total votes
Sal Polito	1,272	54.90
Jerry Ford	1,045	45.10
Total valid votes	2,317''	100.00

2000 Kawartha Lakes election, Councillor, Ward Ten
Candidate	Total votes	% of total votes
Howard Robinson	1,029	58.93
Stephen Morgan	717	41.07
Total valid votes	1,746	100.00

2000 Kawartha Lakes election, Councillor, Ward Eleven
Candidate	Total votes	% of total votes
Pat O'Reilly	1,553	62.47
Tom Crowe	933	37.53
Total valid votes	2,486	100.00

2000 Kawartha Lakes election, Councillor, Ward Twelve
Candidate	Total votes	% of total votes
Sandra Jack	960	48.83
Tim Pearson	564	28.69
Bill Beatty	442	22.48
Total valid votes	1,966	100.00

2000 Kawartha Lakes election, Councillor, Ward Thirteen
Candidate	Total votes	% of total votes
Pat Warren	696	35.38
George Thomson	388	19.73
Margot Brown	311	15.81
Phil How	308	15.66
Wendy Hall	119	6.05
Carl Demoe	88	4.47
Denny Oliver	57	2.90
Total valid votes	1,967	100.00

2000 Kawartha Lakes election, Councillor, Ward Fourteen
Candidate	Total votes	% of total votes
Lloyd Ashmore	944	42.35
Gord Lawder	858	38.49
Walter Jancsik	427	19.16
Total valid votes	2,229	100.00

- Lloyd Ashmore (died September 30, 2004) was a beef farmer and veteran municipal politician in central Ontario. He was first elected as one of four councillors in Emily Township, Ontario in the early 1950s, receiving 331 votes and earning ninety-two dollars for his first year of public service. He served in municipal politics on and off until his death, and was at different times Emily's reeve and deputy reeve. He supported the community's amalgamation into Kawartha Lakes in 2000. The 2000 election was his last campaign; he did not seek re-election in 2003. Ashmore was known for his gentle demeanour and his encyclopedic knowledge of local politics. He died at age eighty-four after collapsing in his barn, after either a heart attack or dizzy spell. His memorial service was at the Cambridge Street United Church in Lindsay. His daughter, Mary Smith, is also a municipal politician.

2000 Kawartha Lakes election, Councillor, Ward Fifteen
Candidate	Total votes	% of total votes
Gerald McGregor	858	47.69
Frank Hickey	638	35.46
David Wellman	303	16.84
Total valid votes	1,799	100.00

2000 Kawartha Lakes election, Councillor, Ward Sixteen
Candidate	Total votes	% of total votes
David Marsh	1,023	62.42
Glen Staples	616	37.58
Total valid votes	1,639	100.00

Source: "Election Results," Lindsay Daily Post, 15 November 2000, p. 3.
