= John O'Toole =

Canadian politician

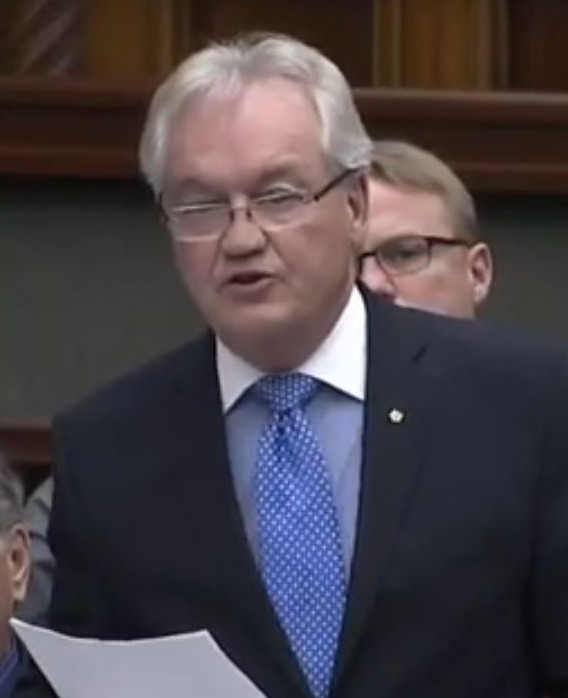
- O'Toole in 2013

Member of the Ontario Provincial Parliament for Durham (Durham East 1995—1999)
- In office June 8, 1995 – June 13, 2014
- Preceded by: Gord Mills
- Succeeded by: Granville Anderson

Personal details
- Born: 1944 (age 81–82) Peterborough, Ontario, Canada
- Party: Progressive Conservative
- Spouses: Mollie Hall (d. 1982); Peggy O'Toole
- Children: Erin O'Toole
- Occupation: Business manager

John O'Toole (born c. 1944) is a retired politician in Ontario, Canada. He was a member of the Legislative Assembly of Ontario from 1995 to 2014, representing the riding of Durham for the Progressive Conservative Party.

== Background ==
O'Toole is the son of Ruth Annabel (Driscoll) and Claire Michael O'Toole. His ancestors arrived in Canada in 1845, fleeing the Great Famine of Ireland. He was born in Peterborough, Ontario, and has a Bachelor of Arts degree from the University of Toronto. After graduation he worked in upper management for General Motors of Canada in Ontario and Quebec. With his English-born late wife, Molly (Hall), his son is politician Erin O'Toole, former leader of the Conservative Party, who was elected to the House of Commons of Canada in a by-election on November 26, 2012, to represent the federal riding of Durham.

== Politics ==
O'Toole was elected as a school trustee in the Peterborough-Victoria-Northumberland district in 1982, and in the Newcastle district in 1988. In 1991, O'Toole was elected as a municipal councillor in Bowmanville, Ontario, and in 1994, he was elected as councillor for Durham Region.

O'Toole scored a significant victory over incumbent New Democrat Gord Mills in the provincial election of 1995, scoring 62 per cent of the popular vote. He was re-elected in the 1999 election, again without difficulty. He was appointed as parliamentary assistant to several ministers including Consumer and Commercial Relations, Finance, and Health and Long-Term Care.

The Progressive Conservatives were defeated in the 2003 provincial election, although O'Toole managed to retain his own riding. In 2004, O'Toole endorsed John Tory's successful bid to lead the Progressive Conservative party (even though his riding is adjacent to that of Tory's main rival, Jim Flaherty).

In February 2014, O'Toole announced that he would not run for re-election.

In September 2014, O'Toole announced his intentions to run for mayor of Clarington in the 2014 municipal election. He officially filed his papers just before the deadline on September 2, 2014. On October 27, he was defeated by incumbent mayor Adrian Foster by 1,362 votes.

=== Middle-finger incident ===
On May 12, 2003, O'Toole was caught on camera in the Ontario Legislature making a middle-finger gesture at NDP House Leader Peter Kormos. He initially denied what he did to media, only to apologize minutes later after he learned it was caught on the legislature video broadcast feed.

== Electoral record ==
2014 Clarington Municipal Election, Mayor of Clarington
Candidate	Votes	%
Adrian Foster	10,093	53.62
John O'Toole	8,731	46.38
Total	18,824	100.00

2011 Ontario general election: Durham
Party	Candidate	Votes	%	±%
Progressive Conservative	John O'Toole	22,393	49.07	+2.14
Liberal	Betty Somerville	13,394	29.35	−2.83
New Democratic	James Terry	8,027	17.59	+5.53
Green	Edward Yaghledjian	1,221	2.68	−6.15
Libertarian	Blaize Barnicoat	424	0.93	
Freedom	David Strutt	172	0.38	
Total valid votes		45,631	100.0	−0.41
Total rejected, unmarked and declined ballots		173	0.38	−0.14
Turnout		45,804	49.74	−4.60
Eligible Voters		92,906		+9.62
Progressive Conservative hold		Swing		+2.49
Source(s) "Summary of valid votes cast for each candidate – October 6, 2011 General Election" (PDF). Elections Ontario. Nov 18, 2011. "Election Summary" ( XLS Spreadsheet). Elections Ontario. Oct 1, 2013.

2007 Ontario general election: Durham
Party	Candidate	Votes	%	±%
Progressive Conservative	John O'Toole	21,515	46.96	−0.14
Liberal	Betty Somerville	14,730	32.15	−4.61
New Democratic	Catherine Robinson	5,521	12.05	−0.36
Green	June Davies	4,053	8.85	+6.51
Total valid votes		45,819	100.0	−9.39
Total rejected ballots		240	0.52	−0.22
Voter turnout		46,059	54.34	−4.06
Eligible voters		84,755		−2.85
Sources: "Summary of valid votes cast for each candidate – October 10, 2007 General Election" (PDF). Elections Ontario. Aug 14, 2008. "Statistical Summary — General Elections 2007" (PDF). Elections Ontario. May 8, 2008.

2003 Ontario general election: Durham
Party	Candidate	Votes	%	±%
Progressive Conservative	John O'Toole	23,814	47.09	−9.98
Liberal	Garry Minnie	18,590	36.76	+4.64
New Democratic	Teresa Williams	6,274	12.41	+3.15
Green	Gordon H. Macdonald	1,183	2.34	+1.32
Freedom	Cathy McKeever	707	1.40	
Total valid votes		50,568	100.0	+10.55
Total rejected ballots		378	0.74	+0.19
Voter turnout		50,946	58.40	−0.11
Eligible voters		87,237		+10.98
Sources: "Summary of Valid Ballots by Candidate – General Election of October 2, 2003". Elections Ontario. "Statistical Summary — General Elections of October 2, 2003". Elections Ontario.

1999 Ontario general election: Durham
Party	Candidate	Votes	%
Progressive Conservative	John O'Toole	26,103	57.07
Liberal	Garry Minnie	14,694	32.12
New Democratic	Jim Morrison	4,235	9.26
Green	Gail Thompson	467	1.02
Natural Law	Jacinthe Millaire	242	0.53
Total valid votes		45,741	100.0
Total rejected ballots		253	0.55
Voter turnout		45,994	58.51
Eligible voters		78,608	
Sources: "Summary of Valid Ballots by Candidate – General Election June 3 1999". Elections Ontario. "Statistical Summary — General Election of June 3 1999". Elections Ontario.
