= Granville Anderson =

Canadian politician

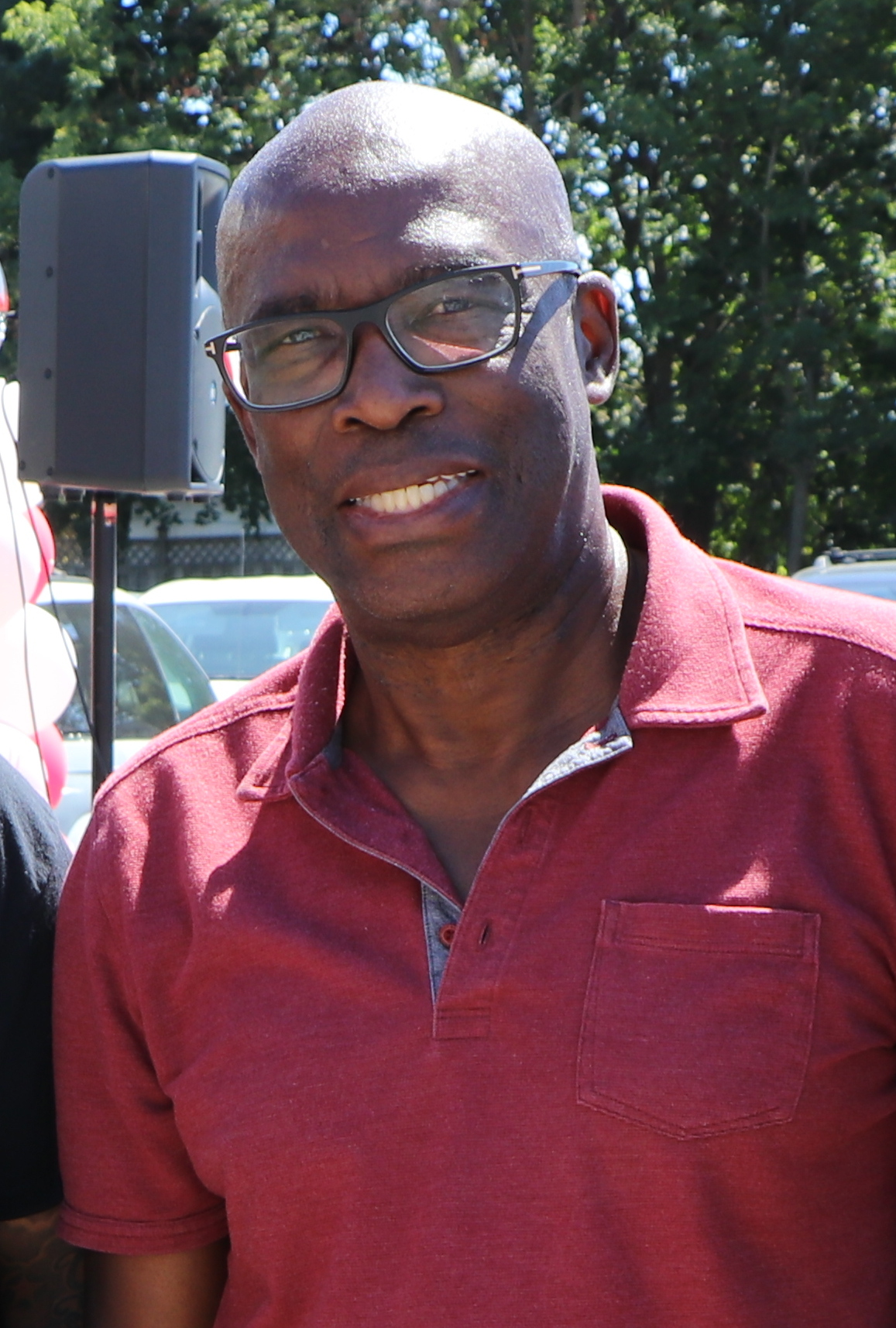
- Anderson in 2022

Member of the Ontario Provincial Parliament for Durham
- In office June 12, 2014 – June 7, 2018
- Preceded by: John O'Toole
- Succeeded by: Lindsey Park

Personal details
- Born: Granville Earl Anderson; 1960 (age 65–66) Jamaica
- Party: Liberal
- Education: University of Windsor
- Profession: Mediator

Granville Earl Anderson (born c. 1960) is a Canadian politician in Ontario, Canada. He was a Liberal member of the Legislative Assembly of Ontario from 2014 to 2018 who represented the riding of Durham. Anderson served as Regional Councillor for Wards 3 & 4 on the municipal council in Clarington, from 2018 to 2022. He is currently Regional Councillor for Wards 1 & 2 of Clarington.

== Background ==
Anderson was born in Jamaica and moved to Canada with his family when he was 13. He attended the University of Windsor where he obtained a certificate in mediation law, and earned a business administration diploma through Seneca College. He was elected as a separate school trustee in 2003, and was eventually elected as the chair of Peterborough, Victoria, Northumberland, and Clarington Catholic District School Board. He owns his own company specializing in mediation services. Prior to entering politics Granville Anderson worked as a mediator at the Workplace Safety and Insurance Appeals Tribunal.

== Politics ==
He ran in the 2014 provincial election as the Liberal candidate in the riding of Durham. He defeated Progressive Conservative candidate Mike Patrick by 1,236 votes.

He served as Parliamentary Assistant to the Minister of Children and Youth Services and as the Parliamentary Assistant to the Minister of Education (Ontario).

Anderson was defeated in the 2018 Ontario general election.

In 2018, Anderson ran for election in the Municipality of Clarington as Regional Councillor for Wards 3 & 4, winning with 34.11% of the vote.

Anderson ran as the Ontario Liberal Party candidate for the riding of Durham in the 2022 Ontario general election, but lost to Progressive Conservative Todd McCarthy.

In 2022, Anderson ran for election in the Municipality of Clarington as Regional Councillor for Wards 1 & 2, winning in a close race with 44.2% of the vote.

== Electoral record ==
=== Provincial ===
2022 Ontario general election: Durham
Party	Candidate	Votes	%	±%
Progressive Conservative	Todd McCarthy	22,614	45.85	–1.14
Liberal	Granville Anderson	12,276	24.89	+8.06
New Democratic	Chris Borgia	9,168	18.59	–13.07
Green	Mini Batra	1,981	4.02	+0.14
New Blue	Spencer Ford	1,898	3.85	–
Independent	Tony Stravato	697	1.41	–
Ontario Party	Lou Devuono	686	1.39	–
Total valid votes		49,320	99.51	
Total rejected, unmarked and declined ballots		242	0.49	–0.50
Turnout		49,562	43.71	–16.23
Eligible voters		113,389		
Progressive Conservative hold		Swing		▼4.60
Source: Elections Ontario

2018 Ontario general election: Durham
Party	Candidate	Votes	%	±%
Progressive Conservative	Lindsey Park	28,575	46.99	+14.38
New Democratic	Joel Usher	19,253	31.66	+3.22
Liberal	Granville Anderson	10,237	16.84	–17.35
Green	Michelle Corbett	2,360	3.88	–0.05
Libertarian	Ryan Robinson	382	0.63	–0.21
Total valid votes		60,807	99.01	
Total rejected, unmarked and declined ballots		609	0.99	–0.83
Turnout		61,416	59.94	+4.23
Eligible voters		102,471		
Progressive Conservative notional gain from Liberal		Swing		+15.87
Source: Elections Ontario

2014 Ontario general election: Durham
Party	Candidate	Votes	%	±%
Liberal	Granville Anderson	19,816	36.45	+7.10
Progressive Conservative	Mike Patrick	18,640	34.29	–14.79
New Democratic	Derek Spence	13,094	24.08	+6.49
Green	Halyna Zalucky	2,382	4.38	+1.71
Libertarian	Conner Toye	434	0.80	–0.13
Total valid votes		54,366	98.18	
Total rejected, unmarked and declined ballots		1,010	1.82	+1.45
Turnout		55,376	55.71	+5.97
Eligible voters		99,404		
Liberal gain from Progressive Conservative		Swing		+10.94
Source: Elections Ontario

=== Municipal ===
2022 Clarington election, Regional Councillor Wards 1 & 2
Candidate	Votes	%
Granville Anderson	5,290	44.2
Janice Jones	5,143	42.9
Bernard Sanchez	1,543	12.9

2018 Clarington election, Regional Councillor Wards 3 & 4
Candidate	Votes	%
Granville Anderson	2,675	34.11
Steven Cooke	2,205	28.12
Wendy Partner	2,083	26.56
Peter Vogel	879	11.21

2010 Clarington election, PVNCCDSB School Board Trustee
Candidate	Votes	%
Granville Anderson	1,345	32.68
Peggy O'Toole	1,168	28.38
Barbara Malone	861	20.92
Nicholle Stanisz	417	10.13
John Slemko	325	7.90

2006 Clarington election, PVNCCDSB School Board Trustee
Candidate	Votes	%
Maureen Day	1,909	38.15
Granville Anderson	1,337	26.72
Barbara Malone	1,325	26.48
Andrew Bennion	433	8.65

2003 Clarington election, PVNCCDSB School Board Trustee
Candidate	Votes	%
Granville Anderson	Acclaimed	
George Ashe	Acclaimed	
