= The Canadian Statesman =

Newspaper in Ontario

- "Our Town And County First: The World Afterwards"
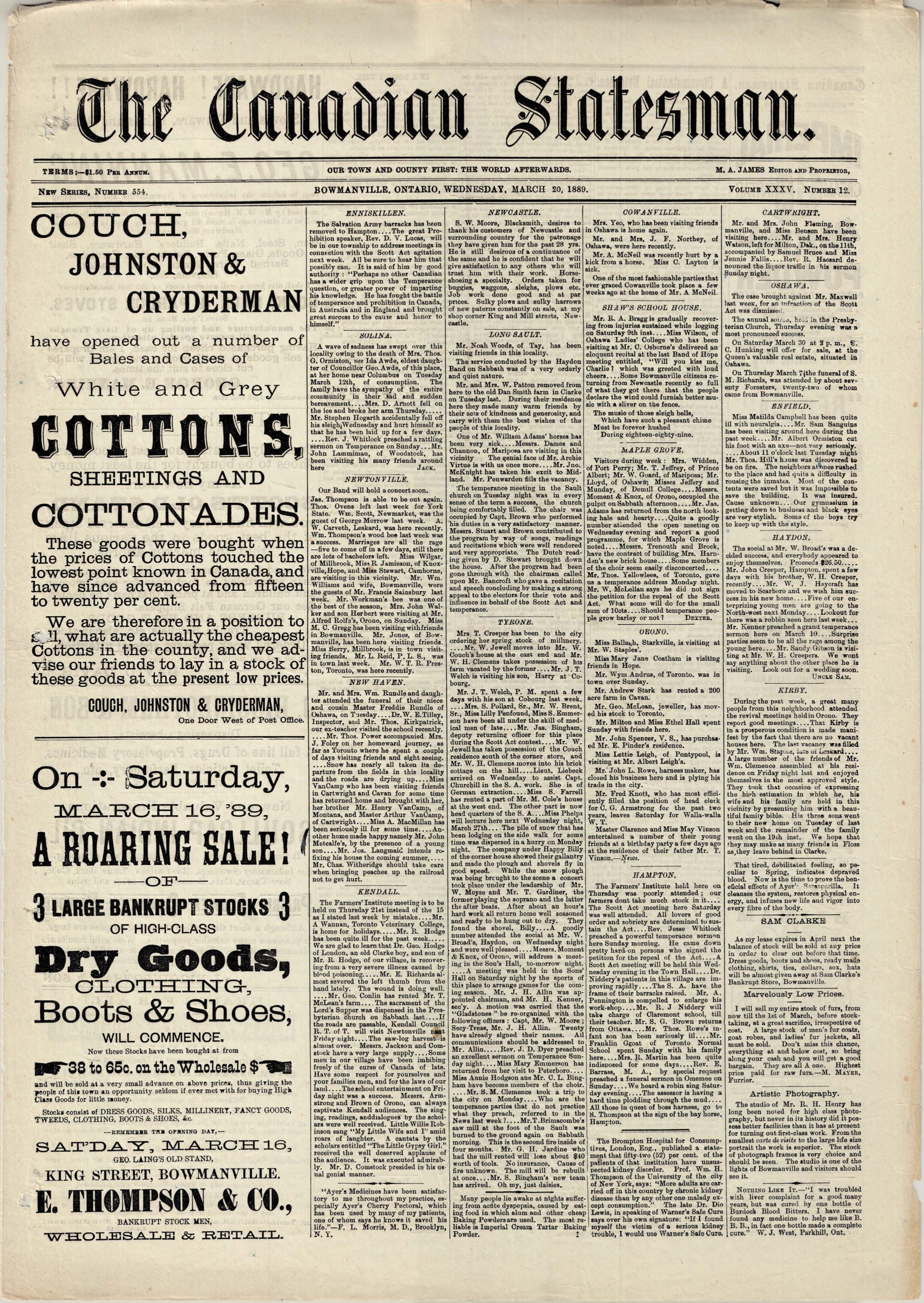
- Front page of a March 1889 issue.
- Type: Weekly newspaper
- Founder: Reverend John M. Climie
- Founded: 1854
- Ceased publication: December 2008
- ISSN: 0834-5651

The Canadian Statesman was a weekly newspaper published in Bowmanville, Ontario, from 1868 to 2008.

== History ==
The Canadian Statesman was started by Reverend John M. Climie, a Scotchman and avid Son of Temperance.The earliest version of the Statesman is as The Messenger, a paper started by James E. McMillan and Alexander Begg as early as 1851. Both gentleman disposed of their interests in the paper in the mid to late 1850s, and Reverend Climie passed it on to his son William.

The paper historically served the communities of Manvers, Cavan, Cadmus, Burketon, Maple Grove, Starkville, Wesleyville, Zion (Hope Township), Port Hope, Clarke, Kirby, Nestleton Station, Leskard, Haydon, Pontypool, Bethany, Hampton, Cartwright, Courtice, Newcastle, Solina, Enfield, Tyrone, Newtonville, Long Sault, Enniskillen, Yelverton, Darlington, Blackstock, Elizabethville, Clarington and Bowmanville. Upon absorption of the Orono News, the paper dedicated a number of columns to just that topic, and similarly for the Newcastle Independent.

During the ownership of W. R., the paper experienced a serious fire in 1895. A thoroughly Tory sheet, the paper claimed Orangeman Harcourt P. Gowan, son of Ogle R., as an editor during this period. Climie married Elizabeth Sanderson in March 1864 and edited the paper until August 1, 1878, when it was purchased by Moses Aaron James for the sum of $3000.

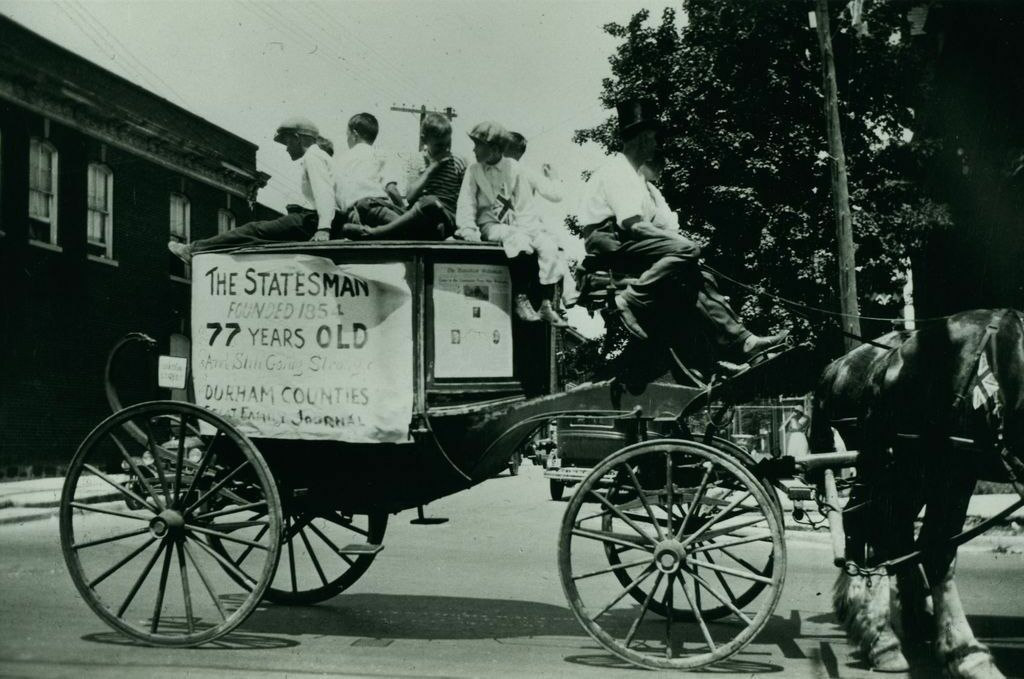
Canadian Statesman in a Parade, Bowmanville c. 1931

Moses was born January 14, 1848, in the parish of Bradworthy, Devonshire, England, the son of John James and Elizabeth Oke. He married Mary Jane Bray (1845 - 1927) and had 3 adult children. In the late 1800s, the Statesman was being printed out of the Bible Christian Publishing House, owned by Cephas Barker of The Bowmanville Merchant and Observer. William McKowan was the foreman for the Statesman, printing a four-page double Royal sheet which sold for $1 per annum. In 1903/1904, Moses was the mayor of Bowmanville, having been a Reeve and town councillor before that. The elder James published the paper until January 1919, when his sons Norman S. B. and George W. S. succeeded him to head of the James Publishing House. M. A. would continue as chief editor, with help from "editress" Elizabeth E. Haycraft. Moses would pass away on November 22, 1935.

"Durham County's Great Family Journal" earned its name over the years, as Norman James would run the mechanical side of the paper, while brother George would inherit the editorship, both as equal members in the M. A. James & Sons company. When Norman passed suddenly in 1929 at the age of 47, his widow became a silent partner. George served as Mayor of Bowmanville 25 years after his father, nominated by the same gentleman. After the brothers would come John M. James, who published the paper, including his son Rick in the business starting in 1980, until it was purchased by the Metroland Printing and Publishing in 1999. The paper was discontinued in December 2008, becoming absorbed into the Clarington This Week publication as a tabloid in 2007. The James family continues to operate a printing business in Bowmanville.

== See also ==
- List of newspapers in Canada

Correct the spelling of Cadmus, Ontario
