= Orono, Ontario =

Orono
- Unincorporated community
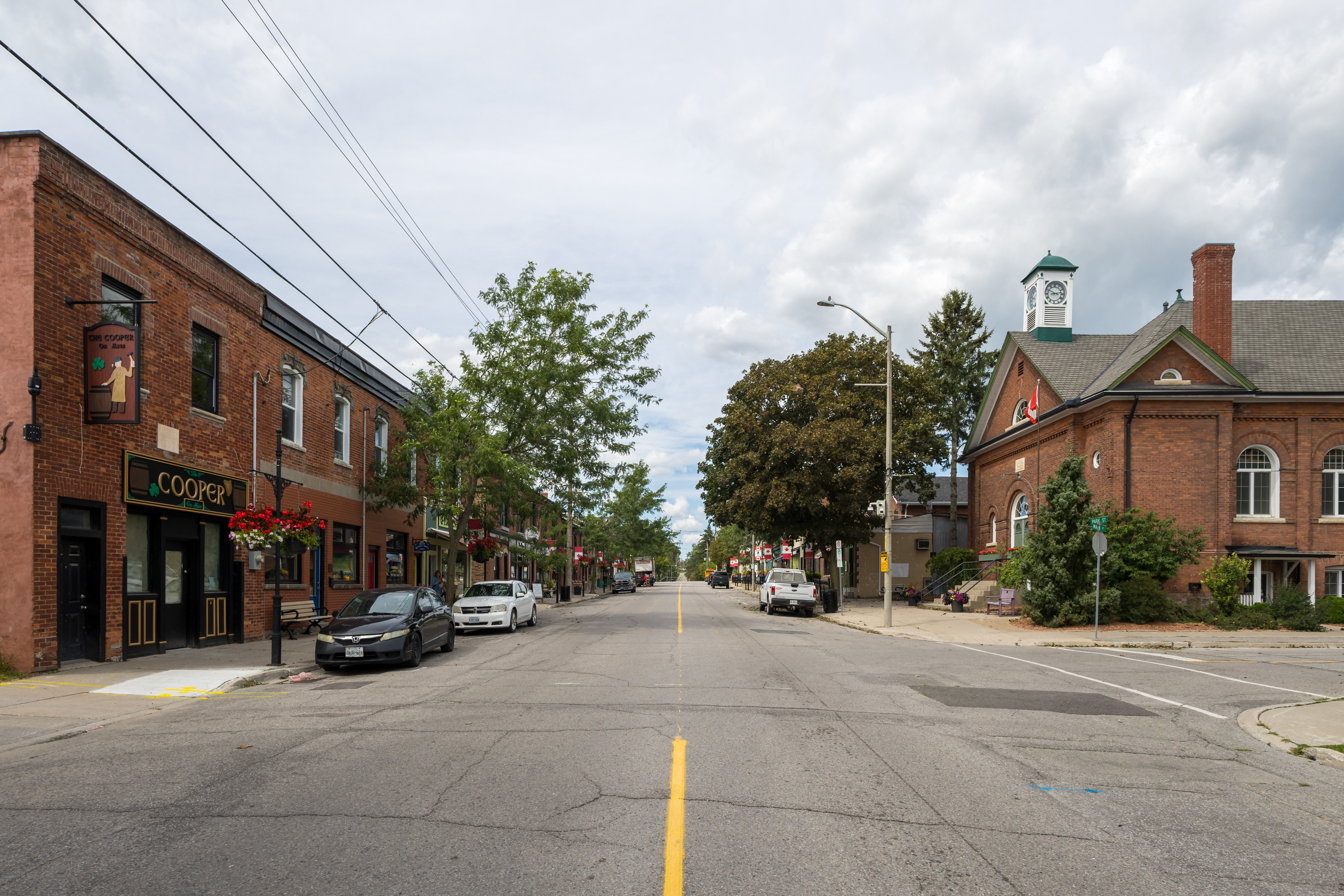
- Main Street, Downtown Orono

- Location within Southern Ontario
- Coordinates: 43°58′47″N 78°37′2″W
- Settled: 1832

Population (2016)
  - Total: 1,105
- Time zone: UTC-5 (EST)
  - Summer (DST): UTC-4 (EDT)
- Forward sortation area: L0B 1M0
- Area codes: 905 and 289
- NTS Map: 30M15 Oshawa
- GNBC Code: FDMMS

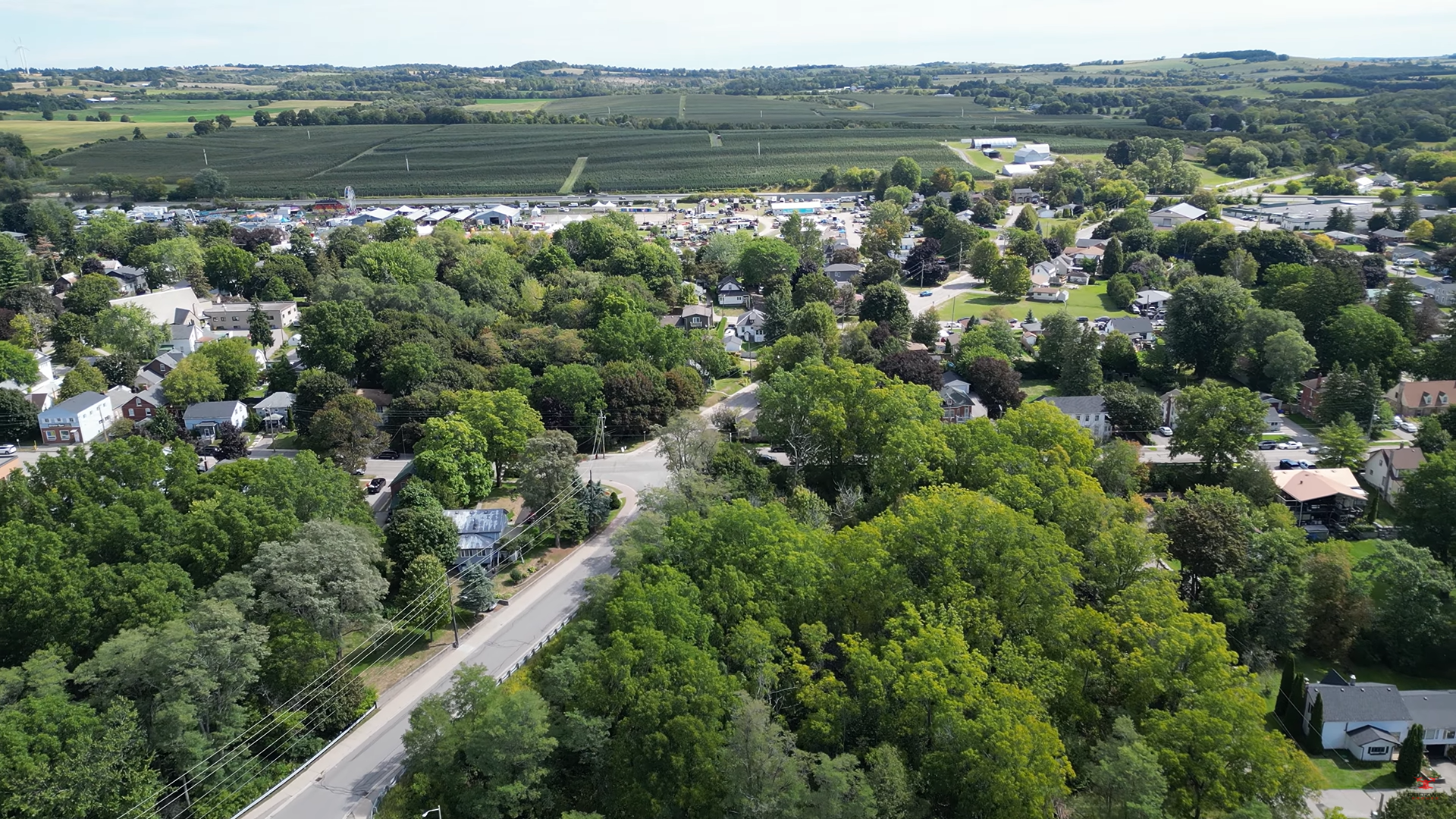
Aerial view of Orono in 2025

Orono is a community in the Municipality of Clarington, Ontario, Canada. It is located on the southern stretch of Highway 35/115, approximately 87 km (54 mi) east of Toronto.

== History ==
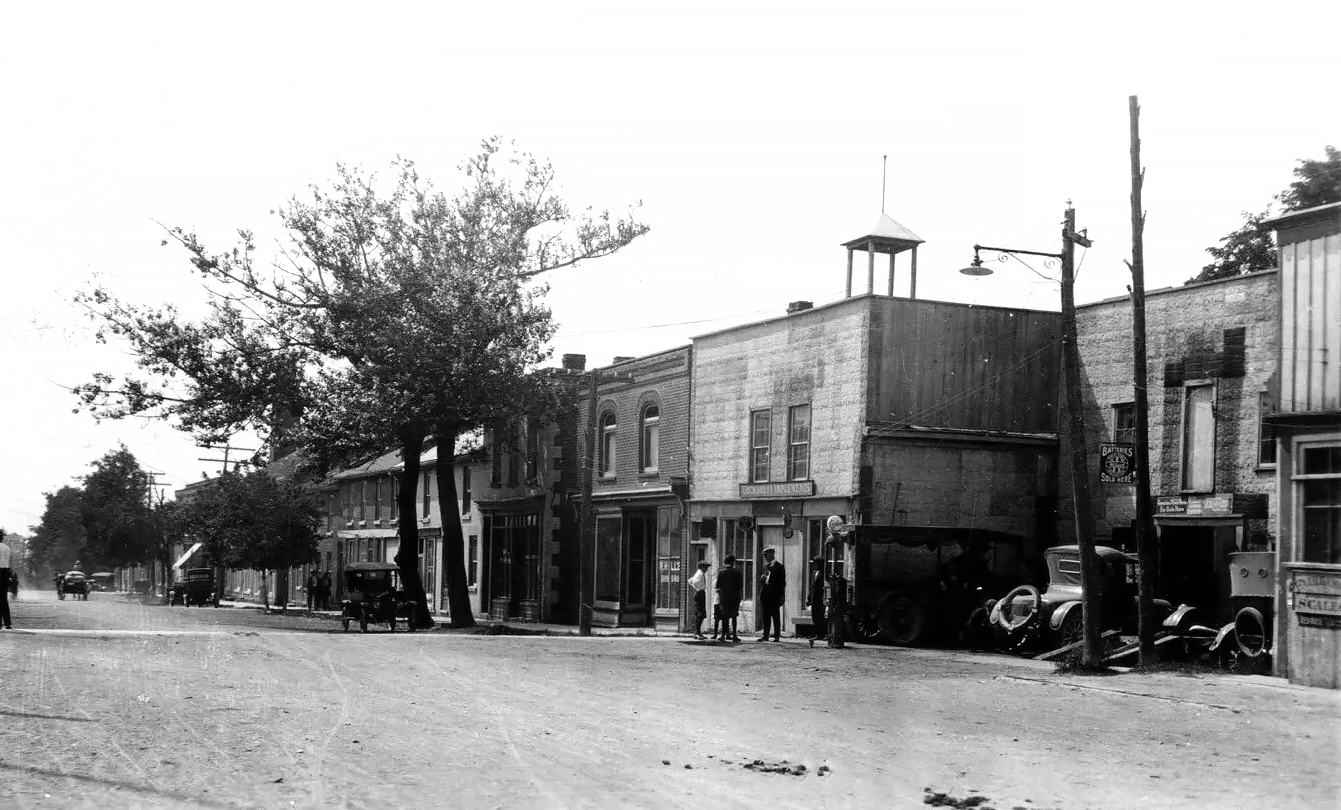
Main Street in Orono, c. 1910s

The town was founded in 1832. A post office was opened at Orono in July 1852 (postmaster: Joseph Tucker), when the village contained about 200 residents, and was named after Orono, Maine since the landscape seemed similar. The name for the post office is said to have been selected in 1852 when a visitor from Maine suggested Orono— the name of a town near Bangor, Maine. Declared a police village in 1854, the village remained small but vibrant. Significant to the village's growth in the opening decades of the twentieth century was the arrival of the Canadian Northern Railway in 1911. Farming was, and remains, an important economic activity in the area. Many motorists stopped in the town on their way from Lindsay to Newcastle before the 35/115 was built. The population is approximately 1800.

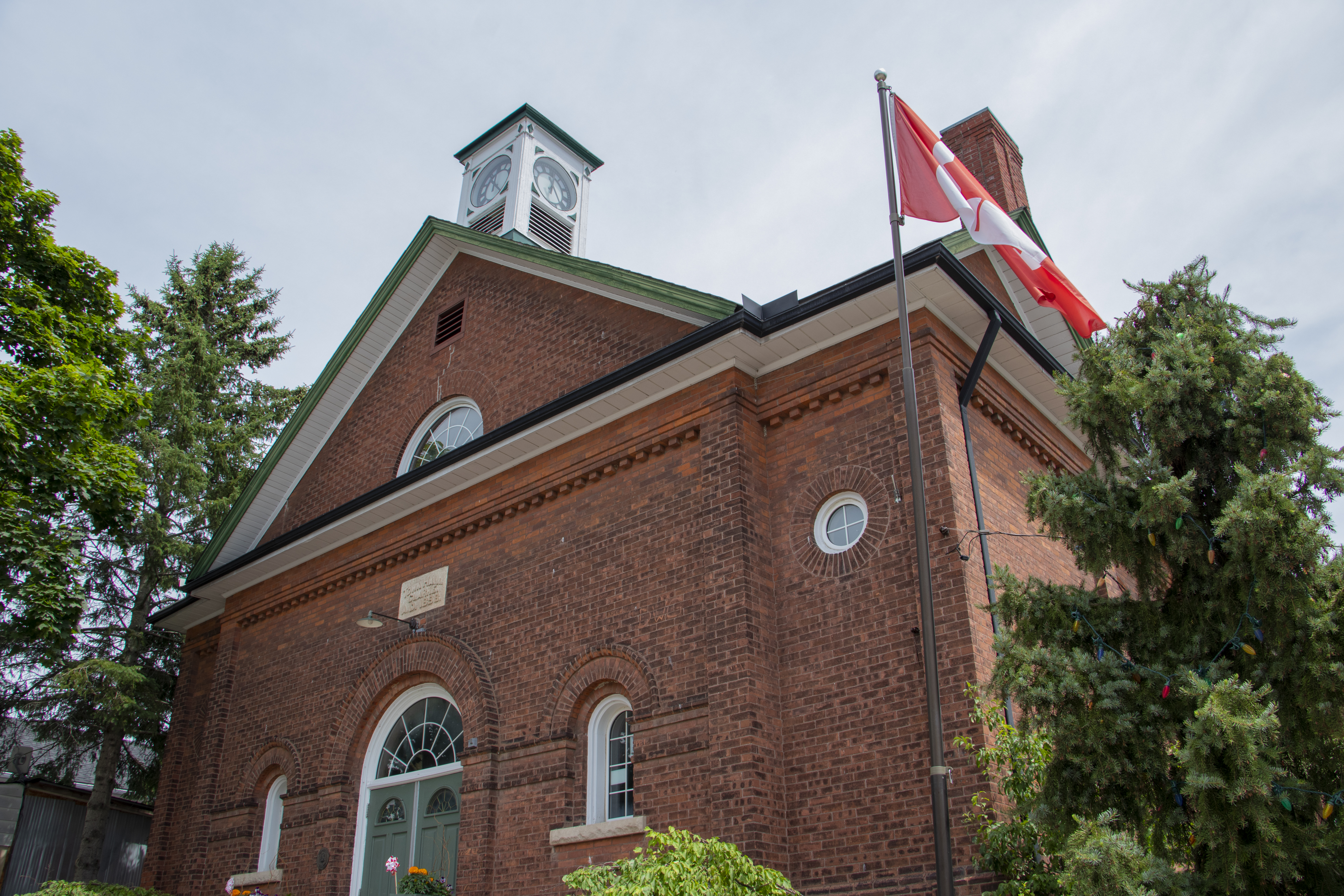
Orono Town Hall, erected in 1898 to serve as Town Hall for Clarke Township

The Municipality of Clarington, in which Orono is located, was formed through the union of the Townships of Clarke and Darlington. Historically, Orono was the seat of government for Clarke Township. Now Clarington's fourth largest urban community, Orono is attractive to those who prefer a quiet, more rural lifestyle. The downtown consists of several small shops and a central town hall that are typical of villages throughout Ontario and the northern United States.

Most of Orono's youth residents who attend Orono public school move onto The Pines and Clarke High School, located just off the Highway 115 on the border of Newcastle; both are among the oldest active Middle and Secondary schools in the area.

The Clarke Raiders, who are the local high school hockey team, are one of the best in the district. The team boasts AAA players, and players from the local clubs of Newcastle and Orono.

The Orono Leafs, the local CC hockey club, began in the late 1990s, and still have a popular program that is successful.

== Tourism ==
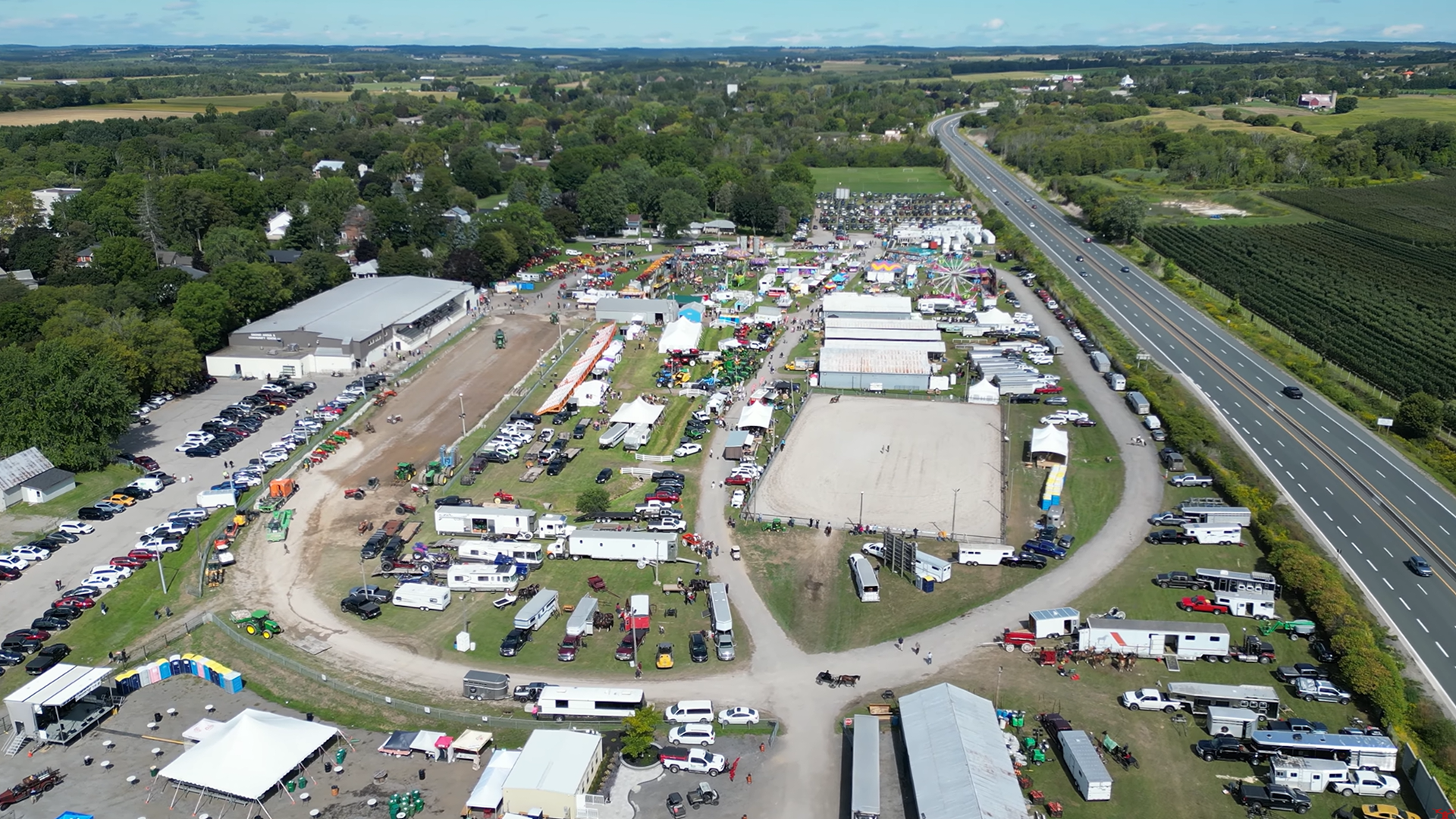
Orono Fair in 2025

Orono is the locale for several yearly events in Clarington: the Orono Fair hosted by the Orono Agricultural Society the first weekend after Labour Day every year. The fair draws nearly 30,000 annually to celebrate the area's agricultural roots and features equestrian events, Livestock shows, School and Children's exhibits, Agricultural Education, Art Show Competition, Pie and Cake Auction, Woodworking, Cooking Demonstrations, Live Entertainment, Truck and Tractor Pulls, Horse Pulls, Demolition Derby and much more.

There were previously 4 antique stores in the downtown core of the village, which caused Orono become an antiquing Mecca, drawing people from far and wide to shop for antique and vintage treasures.

Notable landmarks include:

- Orono Country Cafe
- Jungle Cat World
- Orono Fairgrounds
- Orono Masonic Lodge - Orono No. 325
- The Apple Blossom Shop
- The Trillium Morgan Horse Farm
- Ray's Barber Shop
- Orono Community Centre (Hockey Rink)
- Mosque Masjid Alwadood
- Terrens Wellness Centre
- Orono Antique Market (located in the old Orono Armoury)
- Main Thru Church Antique Mall

Producing millions of evergreen seedlings annually for restoring Ontario's forests, the Orono Forestry Station (founded in 1922) was a prominent feature in the town until it closed down in 1996. The trails that snake throughout the station are walked daily be residents and geocachers alike.

At the centre of the village, residents and tourists enjoy the Sydney B. Rutherford Woods Walk Park, one of the many wooded areas in the village. Orono is surrounded by several pastoral hamlets, such as Kirby, Kendal, Newtonville, Leskard, Starkville; and larger towns like Newcastle and Bowmanville.

Despite its size, Orono boasts a popular zoo called Jungle Cat World, located on the north side of Orono, as well as the Orono Fair which draw people from miles around.

The nearby Brimacombe (Oshawa Ski Club), locally known as the Kirby Ski Hill, is a popular winter attraction, and has a dramatic landscape view of the Oak Ridges Moraine's rolling hills and farmlands at the top of the hill in the Summer season. The ski hill boasts 4 chairs, and one T-Bar. The club also provides 8 green runs, 6 blue runs, 8 black runs and two terrain parks for the paying public to use. There is also a summer camp after the skiing season.

== In film ==
Orono has been a popular filming location for many years:

- Deranged (1974), used one farm at 3926 Concession Rd 6
- Dead Zone (1983), used Orono Town Hall in the film's finale
- Wind at My Back (1996), used various buildings in the village
- ...First Do No Harm (1997), television film starring Meryl Streep
- Patrick Lussier's Dracula 2000
- 11.22.63, 2015 Hulu series starring James Franco
- Anne with an E, 2017 television series
- American Gods (TV series), 2017 Starz series based on Neil Gaiman's 2001 novel of the same name
- Polar, 2019 Netflix film starring Mads Mikkelsen and Vanessa Hudgens

== Notable people ==
- Bryan Bickell, former NHL player
- Jeramy Dodds, poet and 2007 recipient of CBC Literary Award for poetry
- Dan O'Toole, sports anchor and former co-host of SC With Jay and Dan on TSN
- Bev Oda, former Canadian Member of Parliament
- Rachel Bonnetta, reporter and television host currently working for NFL Network.
