= Clarington =

- Municipality (lower-tier)
- Municipality of Clarington
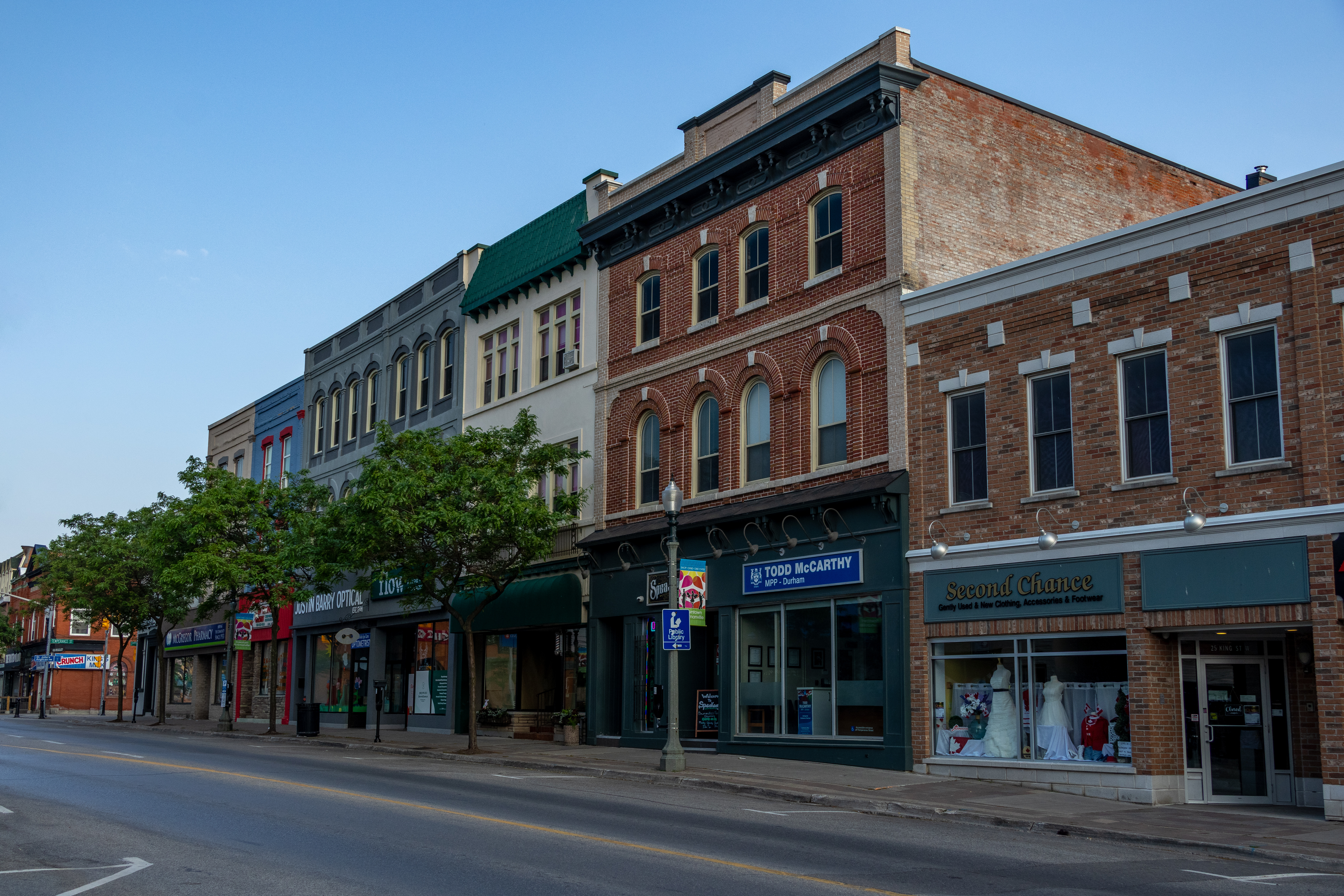
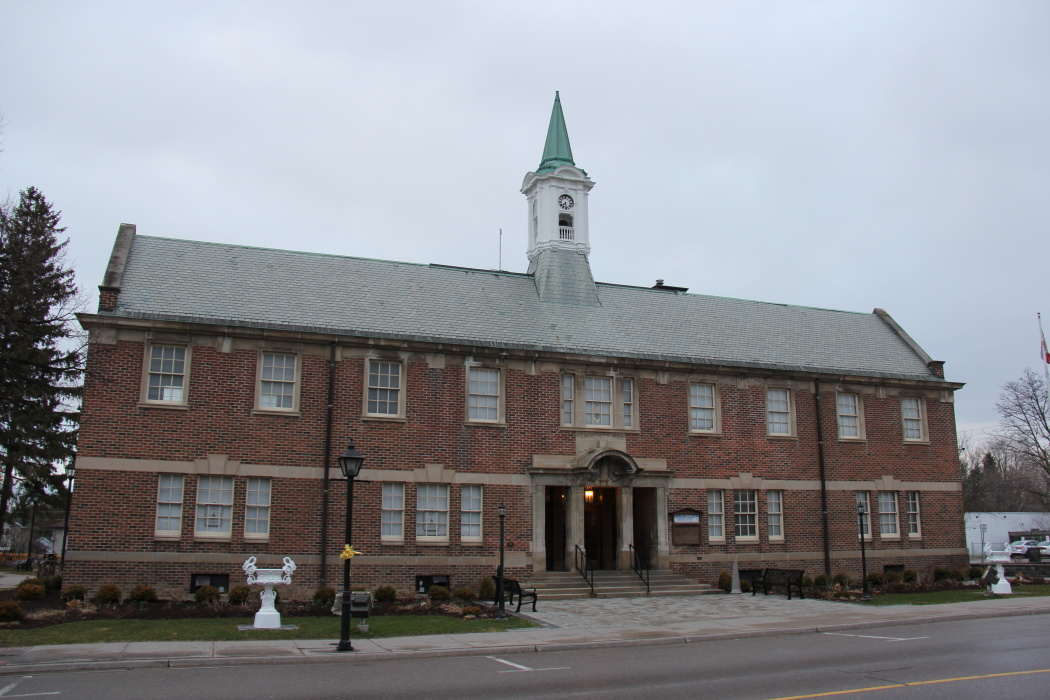
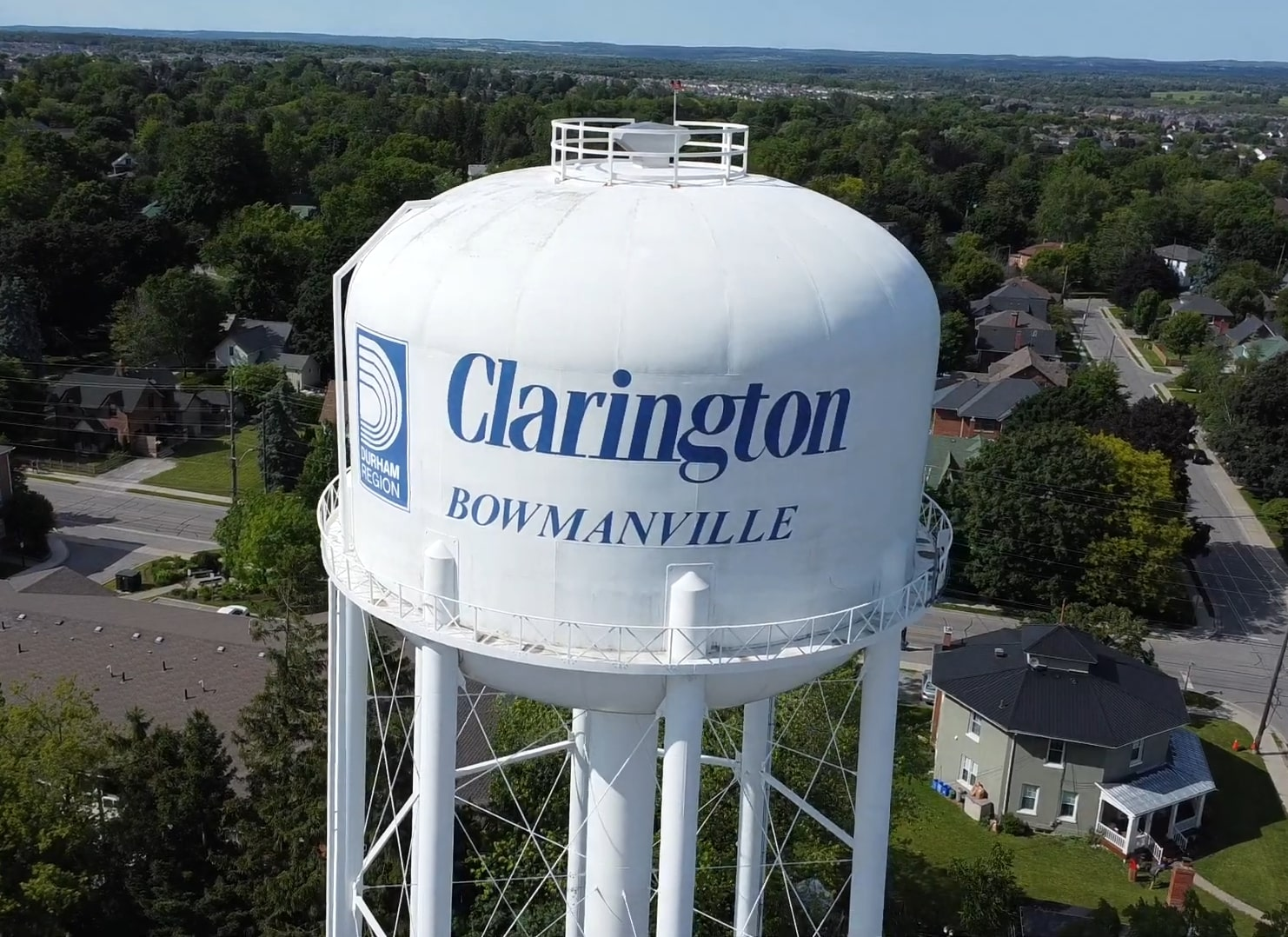
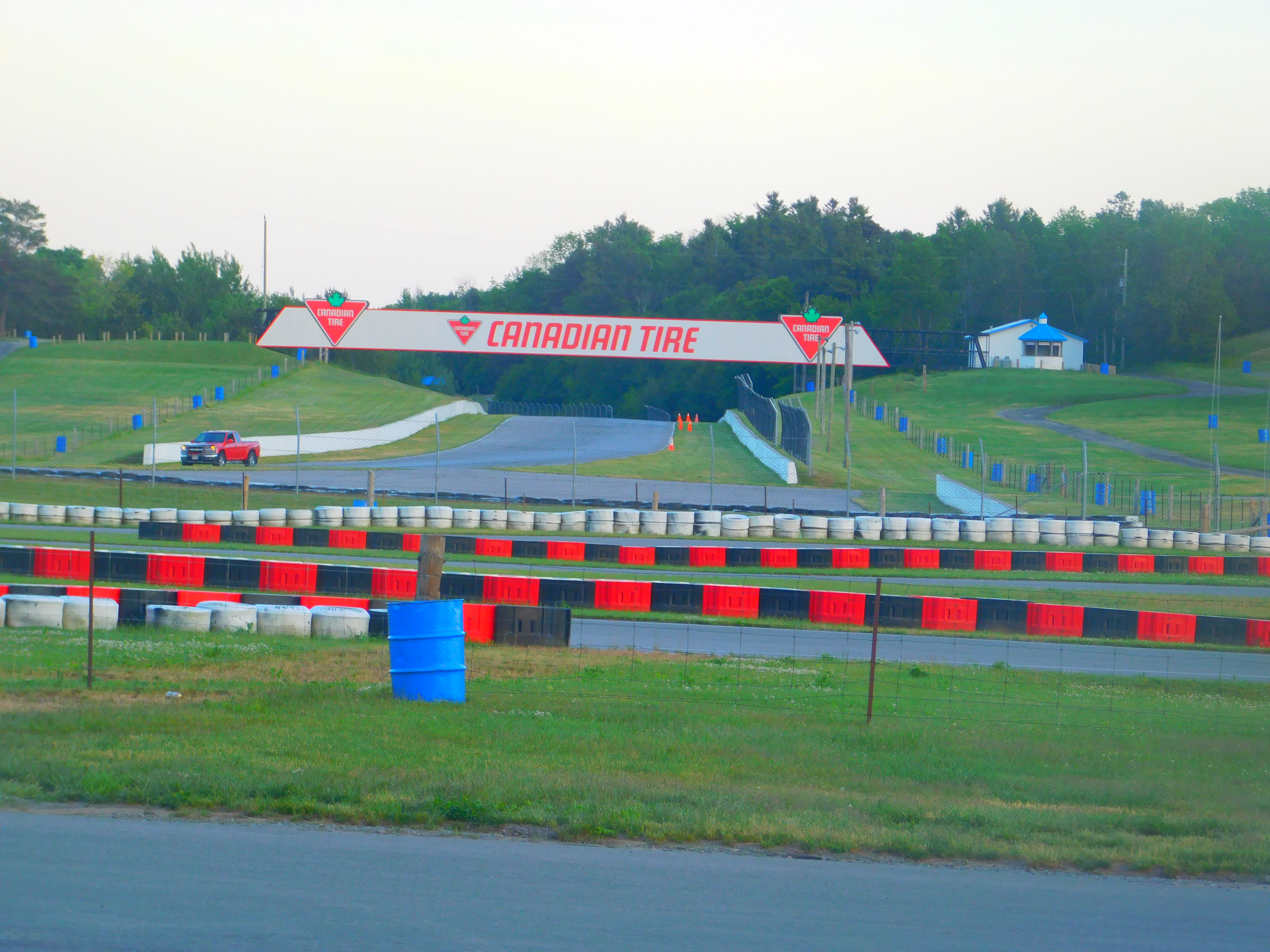
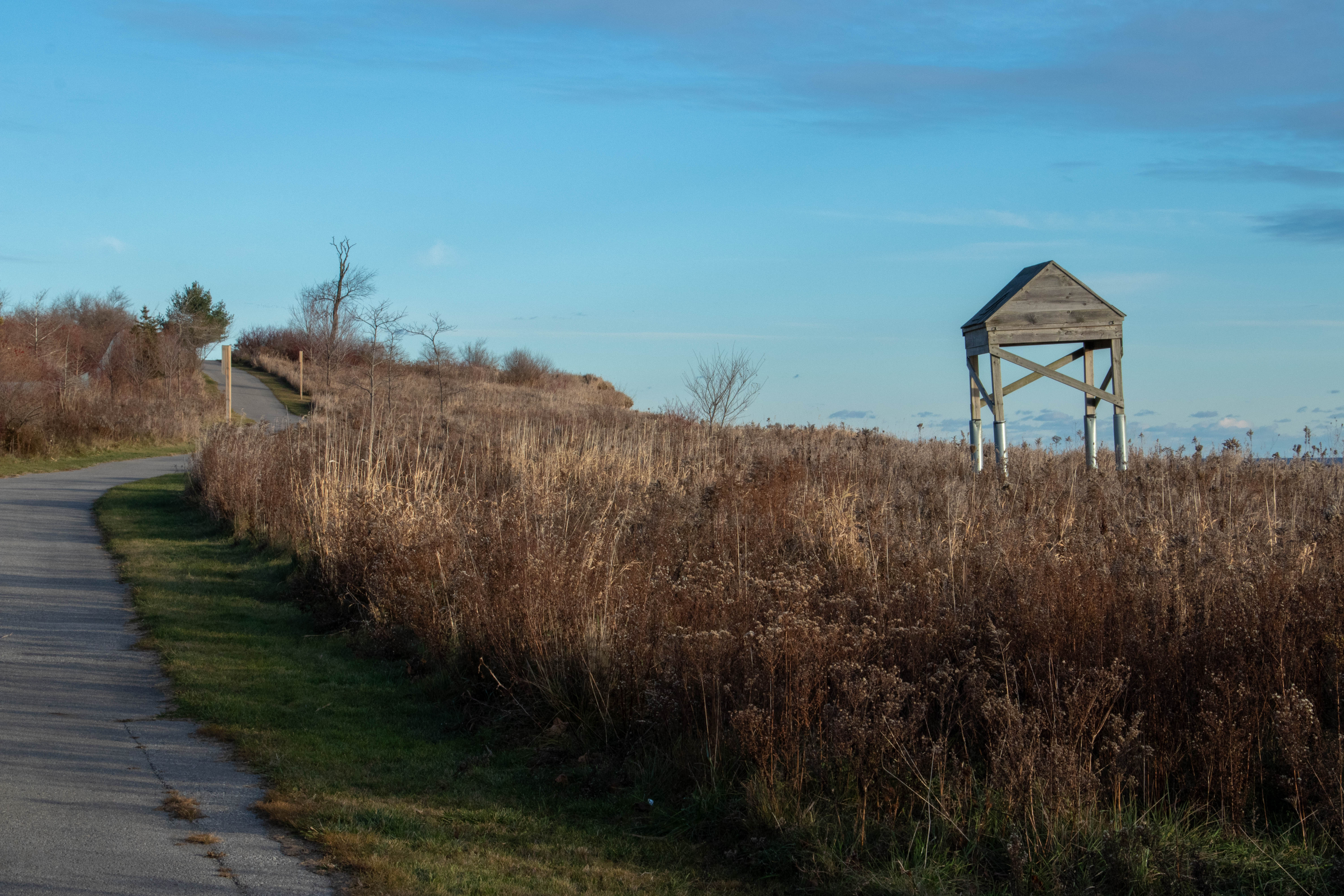
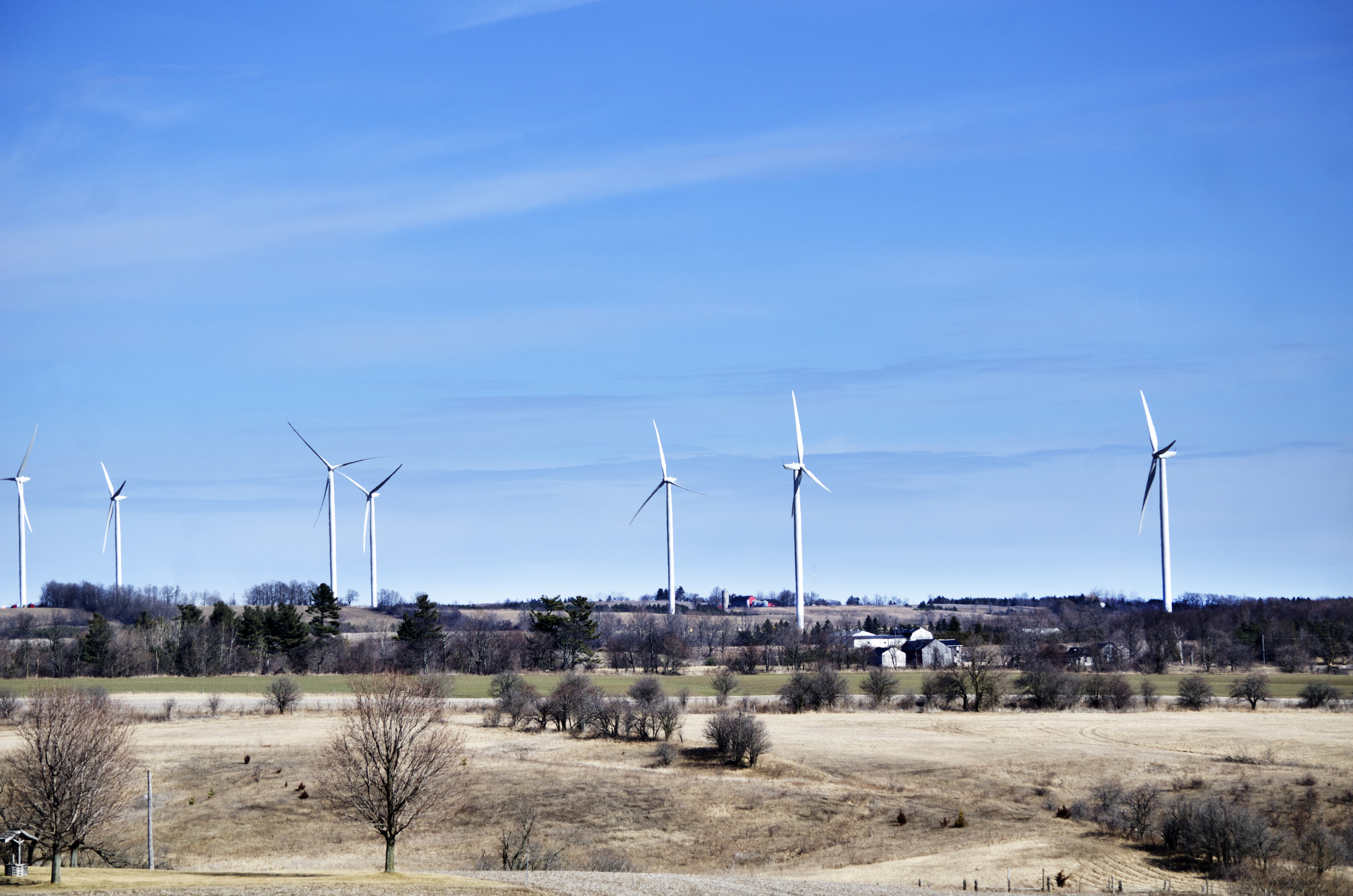
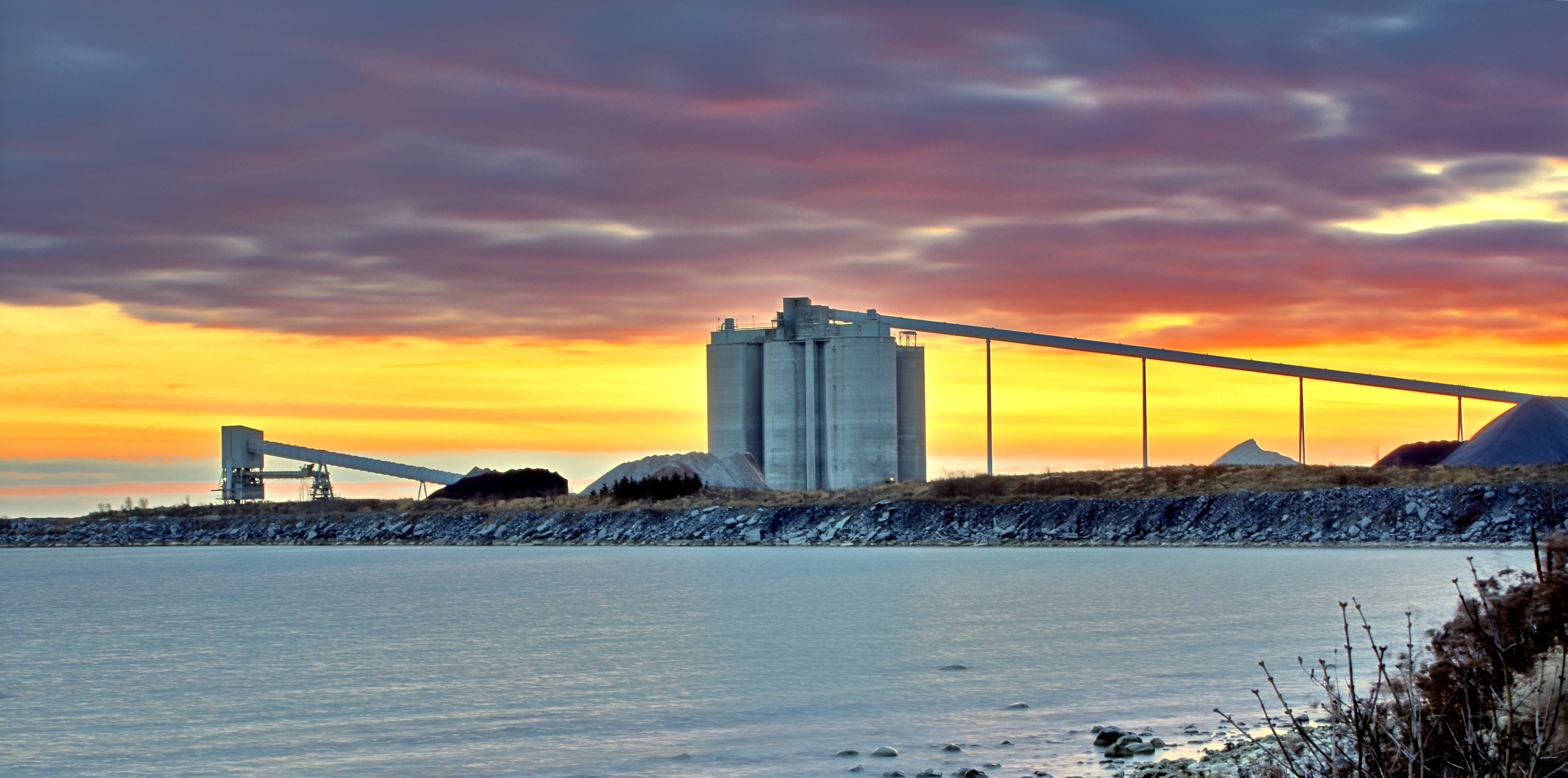
- Downtown Bowmanville Newcastle Community Hall Bowmanville Water Tower Canadian Tire Motorsport Park Courtice waterfront trail at Lake Ontario Ganaraska Wind Farm in Orono St. Mary's Cement plant

- Coat of arms Logo
- Motto(s): "Wisdom Knowledge and Trust" or "Leading The Way"
- Location within Regional Municipality of Durham Location within Southern Ontario
- Coordinates: 43°59′41″N 78°40′30″W
- Country: Canada
- Province: Ontario
- Region: Durham
- Established: 1974

Government
  - Mayor: Tom Dingwall
  - Governing body: Clarington Council
  - MPs, and MPPs: Phillip Lawrence (C); Jamil Jivani (C); Todd McCarthy (PC); David Piccini (PC)

Area
  - Total: 611.3 km^{2} (236.0 sq mi)
- Elevation: 106 m (348 ft)

Population (2021)
  - Total: 101,427 (55th)
  - Density: 166/km^{2} (430/sq mi)
- Time zone: UTC-5 (EST)
  - Summer (DST): UTC-4 (EDT)
- Website: www.clarington.net

Clarington (2021 population: 101,427) is a lower-tier municipality in the Regional Municipality of Durham in Ontario, Canada. It was incorporated in 1973 as the town of "Newcastle" with the merging of the town of Bowmanville, the Village of Newcastle, and the townships of Clarke and Darlington, and was established on January 1, 1974. In 1993, the town was renamed "Clarington", a blending of the names of the two former townships. Darlington today is largely suburban, while Clarke remains largely rural. Bowmanville is the largest community in the municipality and is the home of the municipal offices.

Clarington is part of the Oshawa census metropolitan area in the eastern end of the Greater Toronto Area (GTA). Major employers in Clarington include the Darlington Nuclear Generating Station, General Motors Canada, and several medium to large-sized manufacturing businesses. Most residents commute for work in Durham Region or Toronto.

== Local government ==
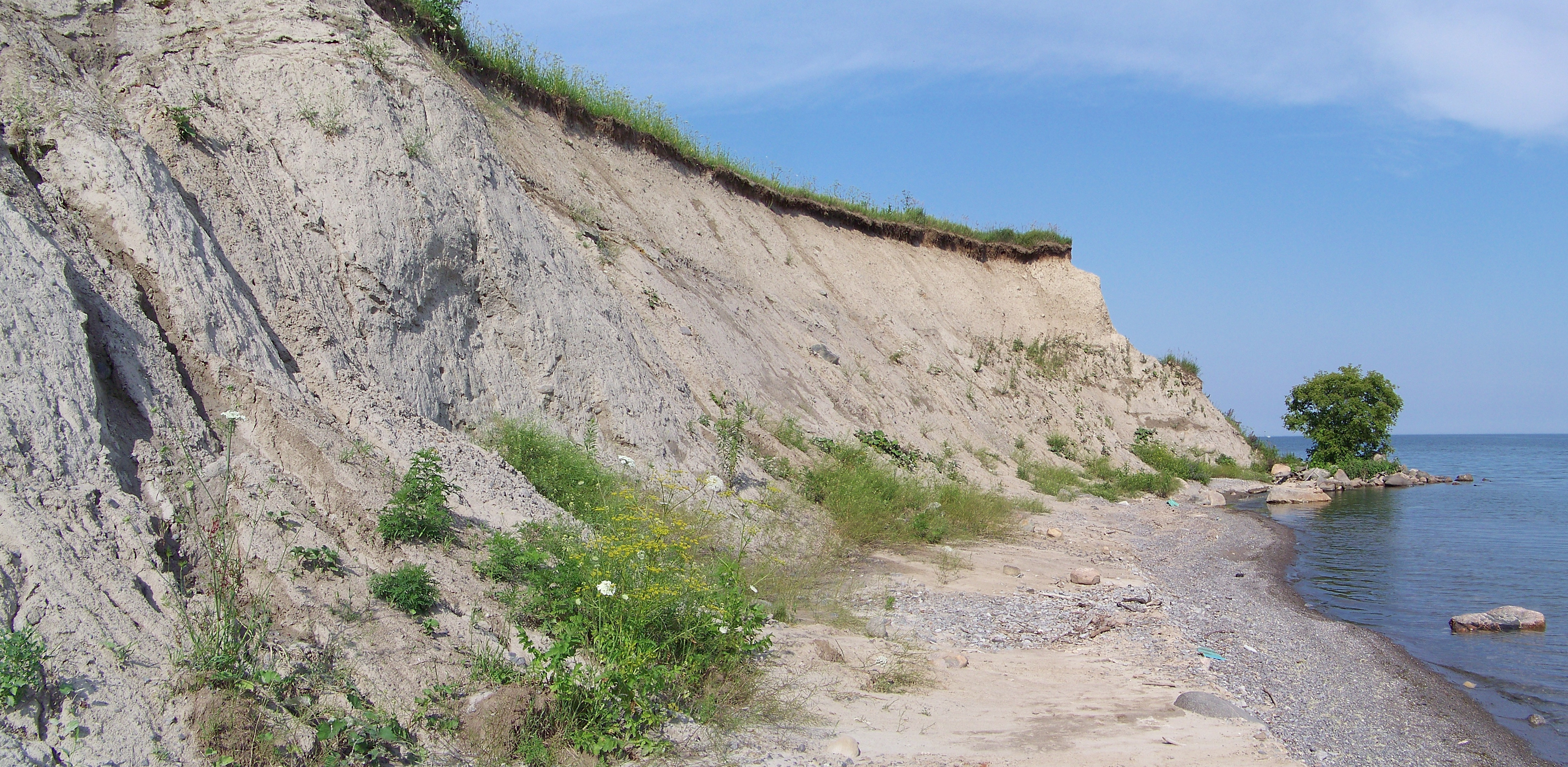
A till cliff on the Lake Ontario shoreline

Clarington is governed by an elected municipal council consisting of a mayor, and local councillors representing each of the municipality's four wards. In addition, two regional councillors each represent a pair of wards. The mayor and the regional councillors sit on both Clarington Council and Durham Region Council.

The current council was elected on October 26, 2026.

Position	Name
Mayor	Tom Dingwall
Regional Councillor, Wards 1 & 2	Granville Anderson
Regional Councillor, Wards 3 & 4	Willie Woo
Local Councillor, Ward 1	Joe Neal
Local Councillor, Ward 2	Kathleen Flynn
Local Councillor, Ward 3	Corinna Traill
Local Councillor, Ward 4	Denise Robinson

== Demographics ==
In the 2021 Census of Population conducted by Statistics Canada, Clarington had a population of 101,427 living in 35,953 of its 36,852 total private dwellings, a change of 10.2% from its 2016 population of 92,013. With a land area of 610.84 square kilometres (235.85 square miles), it had a population density of 166.0/km^{2} (430.1/sq mi) in 2021.

=== Ethnicity ===
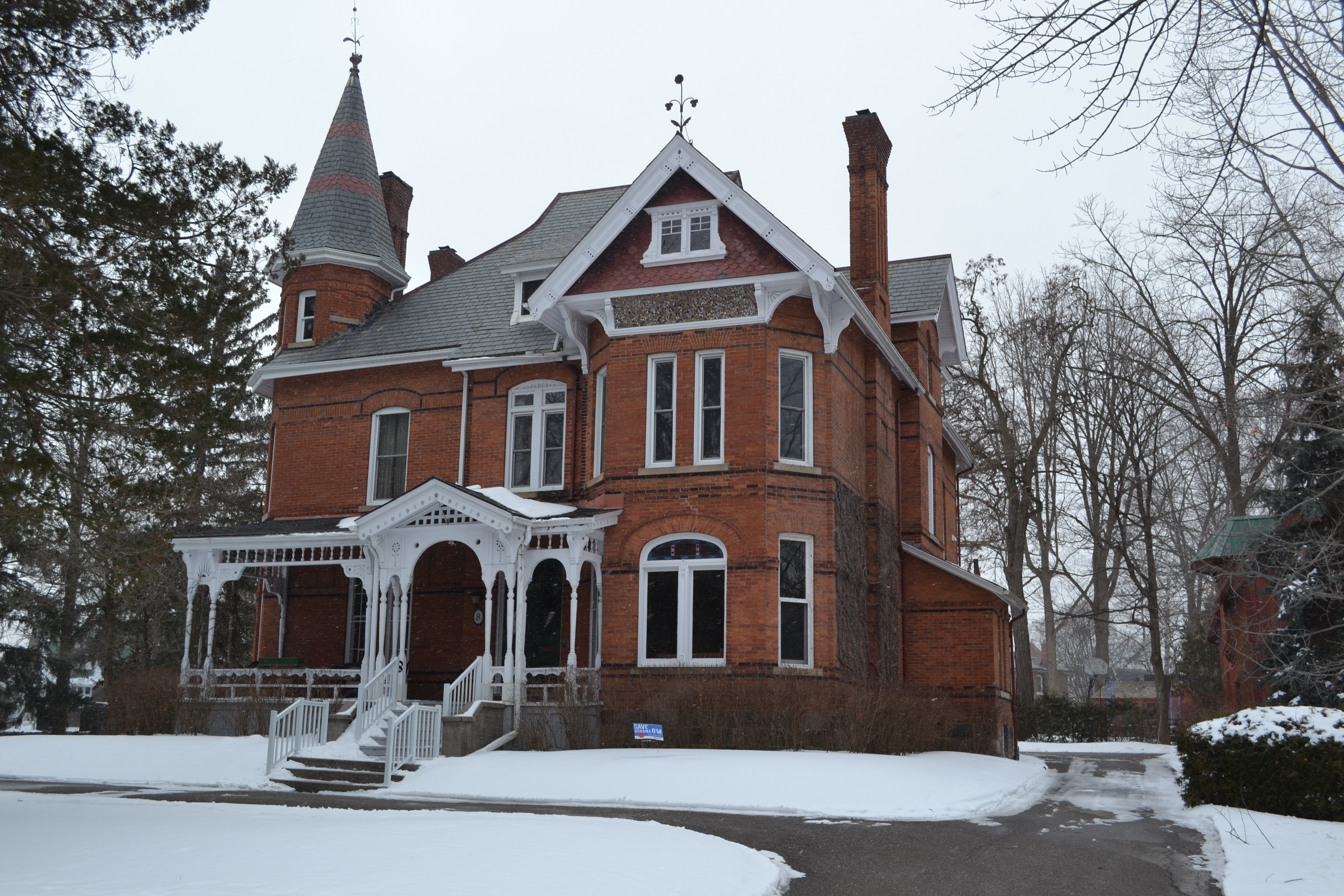
A historic home located in Bowmanville.

Panethnic groups in the Municipality of Clarington (2001−2021)
Panethnic group	2021		2016		2011		2006		2001	
Panethnic group	Pop.	%	Pop.	%	Pop.	%	Pop.	%	Pop.	%
European (Note: Statistic includes all persons that did not make up part of a visible minority or an indigenous identity.)	81,480	80.89%	81,635	89.52%	77,360	92.4%	72,675	93.93%	65,940	95.34%
African	5,255	5.22%	2,495	2.74%	1,895	2.26%	1,640	2.12%	1,040	1.5%
South Asian	4,970	4.93%	1,540	1.69%	705	0.84%	610	0.79%	370	0.53%
Indigenous	2,635	2.62%	2,330	2.56%	1,670	1.99%	1,095	1.42%	650	0.94%
Southeast Asian (Note: Statistic includes total responses of "Filipino" and "Southeast Asian" under visible minority section on census.)	1,545	1.53%	810	0.89%	700	0.84%	265	0.34%	190	0.27%
Middle Eastern (Note: Statistic includes total responses of "West Asian" and "Arab" under visible minority section on census.)	1,260	1.25%	425	0.47%	245	0.29%	205	0.26%	90	0.13%
East Asian (Note: Statistic includes total responses of "Chinese", "Korean", and "Japanese" under visible minority section on census.)	1,215	1.21%	695	0.76%	470	0.56%	440	0.57%	400	0.58%
Latin American	740	0.73%	570	0.63%	290	0.35%	170	0.22%	185	0.27%
Other (Note: Statistic includes total responses of "Visible minority, n.i.e." and "Multiple visible minorities" under visible minority section on census.)	1,625	1.61%	690	0.76%	400	0.48%	255	0.33%	285	0.41%
Total responses	100,730	99.31%	91,190	99.11%	83,725	99.03%	77,370	99.42%	69,160	99.03%
Total population	101,427	100%	92,013	100%	84,548	100%	77,820	100%	69,834	100%

- Note: Totals greater than 100% due to multiple origin responses.

=== Language ===
2011 Census data show that Clarington has one of the highest proportions of residents that have English as their mother tongue within the GTA (91.2%). French is the native language for 1.8% of the population of Clarington. No other language has more than 1% of native speakers (Dutch with 0.8% - 695 native speakers - tops the pack of immigrant languages).

== Communities ==
The municipality of Clarington consists of several urban communities, including Bowmanville, Courtice, Newcastle and Orono; as well as several rural communities such as Bond Head, Brownsville, Burketon, Clarke, Cowanville, Crooked Creek, Enfield, Enniskillen, Gaud Corners, Hampton, Haydon, Kendal, Kirby, Leskard, Lovekin, Maple Grove, Mitchell Corners, New Park, Newtonville, Port Darlington, Port Granby, Salem, Solina, Starkville, Taunton (east portion; west portion split with Oshawa along Townline Road), Tyrone, West Side Beach and Wilmot Creek.

== Infrastructure ==
=== Transportation ===
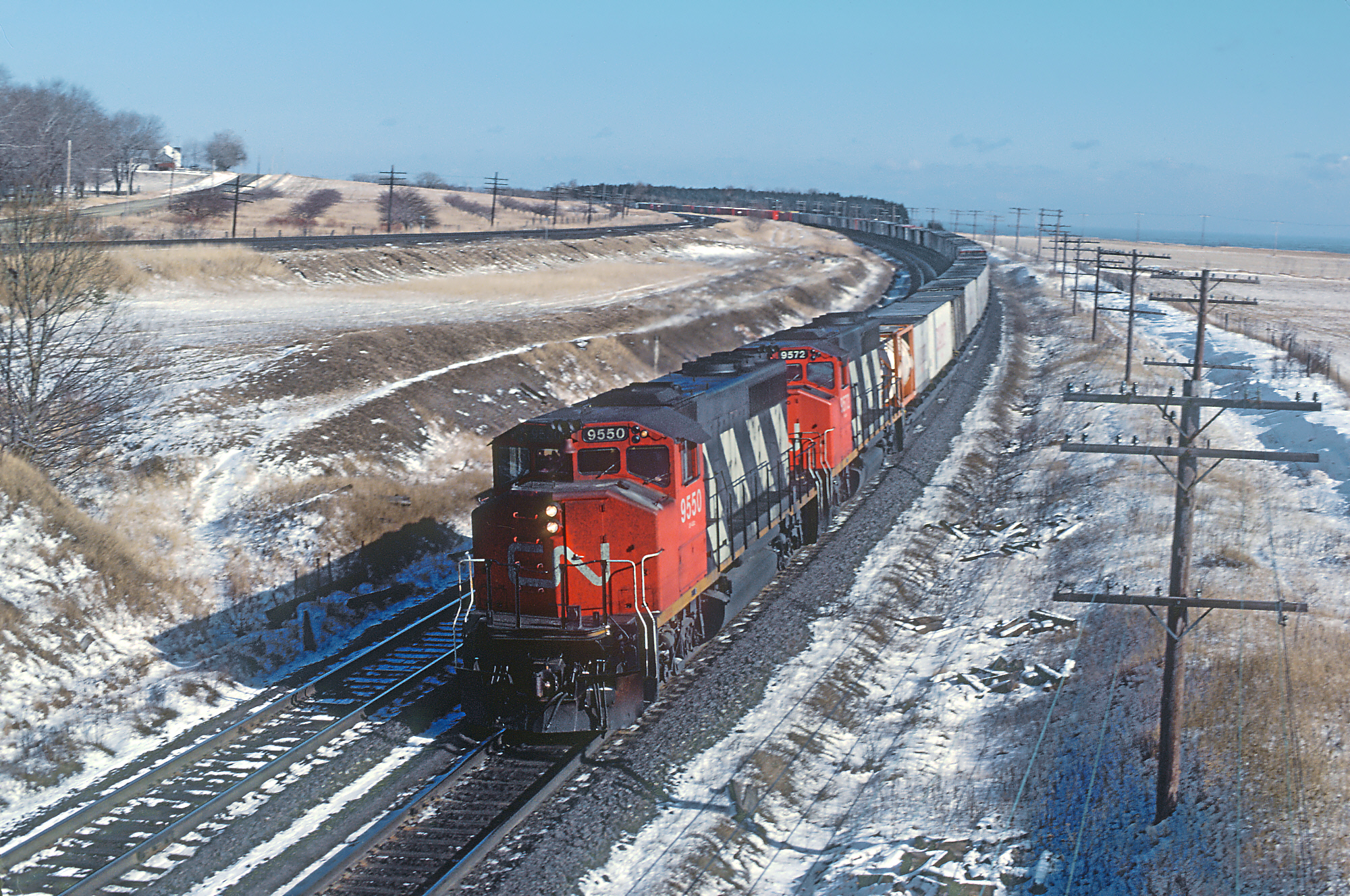
A CN Rail freight train at Lovekin, March 1980

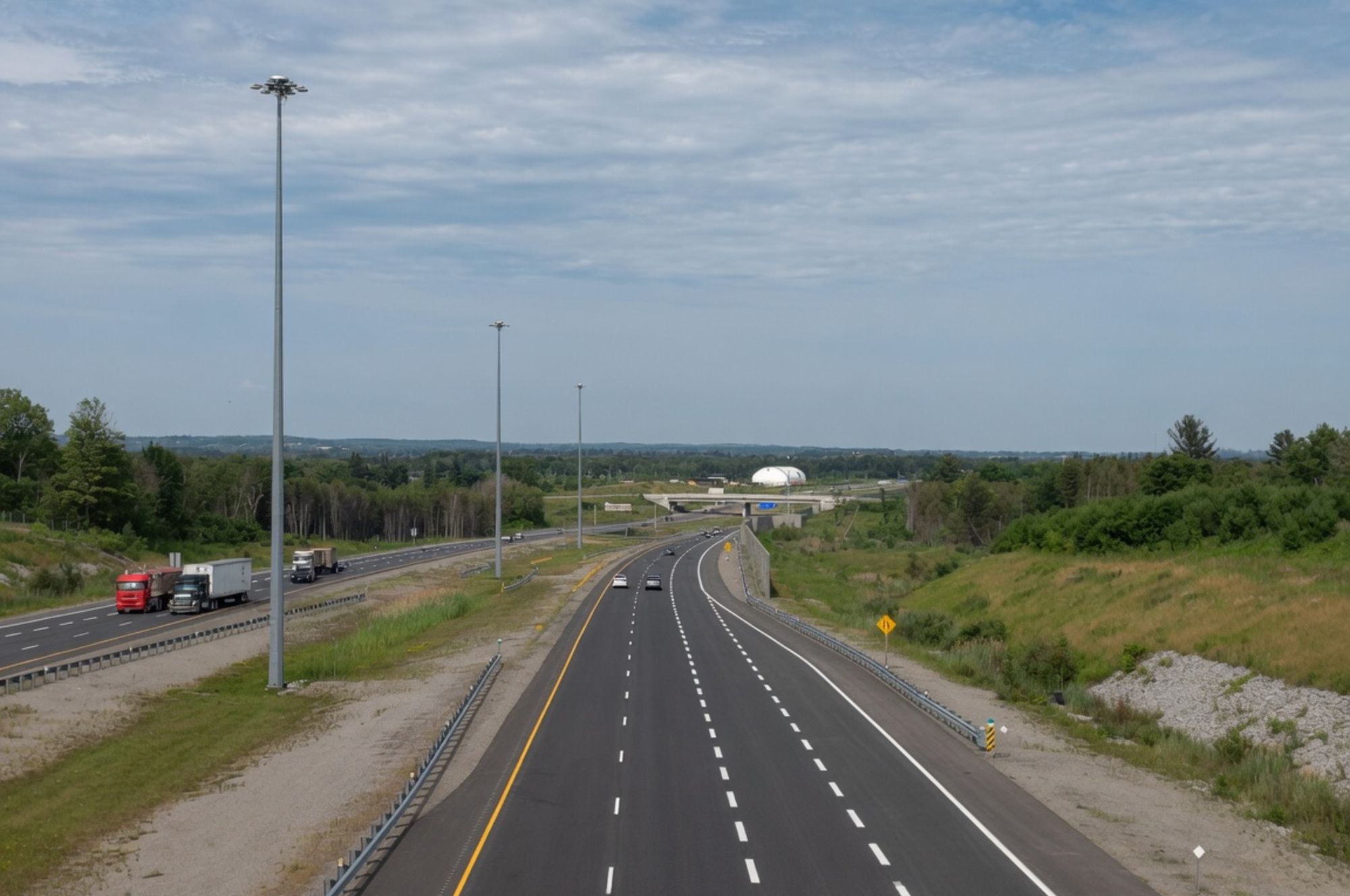
Highway 407 at Holt Road near Hampton

Clarington is home to several highways; three of which are 400 series highways. Highway 401 stretches through the entirety of Clarington, connecting Newtonville, Newcastle, Bowmanville, and Courtice along the route. Highway 407 is located in north Clarington. On December 9, 2019, Highway 407 was extended and now terminates at Highway 35/115. The 35/115, also in Clarington, begins at Highway 401 in Newcastle, and run concurrently until they split north of Kirby and head separate directions towards Lindsay and Peterborough. Highway 418, begins at Highway 401 and heads north to connect to Highway 407. The 418 opened also on December 9, 2019, as a toll highway part of final Phase 2 project on extending Highway 401 eastward. The tolls were removed on April 5, 2022, by the Ontario government. Highway 2, once the primary east–west route across the southern portion of Ontario, runs through Clarington. Downtown Newcastle and Bowmanville are situated along Highway 2.

Bus services are offered by Durham Region Transit and GO Transit. Canadian National Railway's Kingston Subdivision also passes through Clarington.

On June 20, 2016, it was announced that the Lakeshore East line of GO Transit would be extended to Bowmanville. Clarington will gain two new stations: Courtice GO Station in Courtice and Bowmanville GO Station in Bowmanville. The stations were scheduled to open in 2024, but as of 2025 no opening date has been announced.

=== Power ===
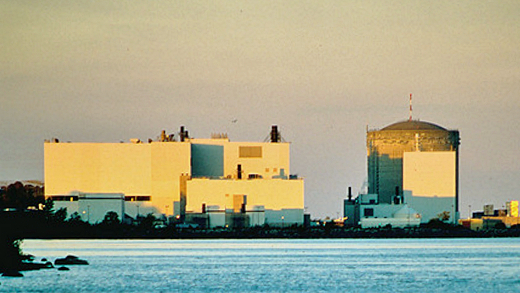
The Darlington Nuclear Generating Station

Clarington is home to the Darlington Nuclear Generating Station.

The Durham-York Energy Centre is located in Clarington. It is home to a 20 MW energy-from-waste (EFW) generation unit that opened in early 2016 that takes waste (140,000 tonnes per year) from Durham and York Regions to burn to generate electricity.

Co-developed by Durham and York Region cost $295 million Canadian to build was built and operated by American-based Covanta. The unit sells and transmits electricity onto Hydro One's distribution network.

Clarington was a candidate location to host ITER in 2001, but the bid was withdrawn two years later.

== Climate ==
Environment Canada operates a weather station in Bowmanville. Under the Köppen climate classification Bowmanville has a humid continental climate with warm summers and cold winters. Unlike many other locations on similar latitudes on the eastern half of the North American continent the winters are relatively mild, with cold extremes being moderated by the proximity to Lake Ontario. In spite of this the average low is around −10 °C (14 °F) in January. Summers are normally moderately warm with averages of around 26 °C (79 °F) during the day but with nights cooling off rapidly to fall below 15 °C (59 °F) on many occasions.

Climate data for Bowmanville Mostert (Clarington) Climate ID: 6150830; coordinates 43°55′N 78°40′W; elevation 99.1 m (325 ft), 1981–2010 normals, extremes 1966–2002
Month	Jan	Feb	Mar	Apr	May	Jun	Jul	Aug	Sep	Oct	Nov	Dec	Year
Record high °C (°F)	13.0 (55.4)	12.5 (54.5)	21.5 (70.7)	29.0 (84.2)	33.0 (91.4)	33.5 (92.3)	36.0 (96.8)	35.0 (95.0)	32.2 (90.0)	26.0 (78.8)	21.1 (70.0)	17.5 (63.5)	36.0 (96.8)
Mean daily maximum °C (°F)	−1.4 (29.5)	0.0 (32.0)	4.3 (39.7)	11.3 (52.3)	18.0 (64.4)	23.1 (73.6)	25.8 (78.4)	24.8 (76.6)	20.4 (68.7)	13.7 (56.7)	7.2 (45.0)	1.6 (34.9)	12.4 (54.3)
Daily mean °C (°F)	−5.6 (21.9)	−4.4 (24.1)	−0.2 (31.6)	6.4 (43.5)	12.4 (54.3)	17.5 (63.5)	20.0 (68.0)	19.2 (66.6)	15.0 (59.0)	8.7 (47.7)	3.4 (38.1)	−2.2 (28.0)	7.5 (45.5)
Mean daily minimum °C (°F)	−9.9 (14.2)	−8.8 (16.2)	−4.6 (23.7)	1.5 (34.7)	6.8 (44.2)	11.8 (53.2)	14.3 (57.7)	13.5 (56.3)	9.5 (49.1)	3.6 (38.5)	−0.4 (31.3)	−6.0 (21.2)	2.6 (36.7)
Record low °C (°F)	−34.0 (−29.2)	−30.0 (−22.0)	−26.0 (−14.8)	−14.4 (6.1)	−5.0 (23.0)	−1.0 (30.2)	2.8 (37.0)	−0.5 (31.1)	−3.3 (26.1)	−8.3 (17.1)	−17.8 (0.0)	−34.5 (−30.1)	−34.5 (−30.1)
Average precipitation mm (inches)	63.1 (2.48)	50.5 (1.99)	55.0 (2.17)	70.6 (2.78)	75.9 (2.99)	83.8 (3.30)	63.2 (2.49)	78.1 (3.07)	98.7 (3.89)	70.8 (2.79)	88.6 (3.49)	68.1 (2.68)	866.5 (34.11)
Average rainfall mm (inches)	32.2 (1.27)	32.8 (1.29)	41.0 (1.61)	68.0 (2.68)	75.9 (2.99)	83.8 (3.30)	63.2 (2.49)	78.1 (3.07)	98.7 (3.89)	70.6 (2.78)	83.1 (3.27)	46.1 (1.81)	773.3 (30.44)
Average snowfall cm (inches)	31.0 (12.2)	17.7 (7.0)	14.1 (5.6)	2.6 (1.0)	0.0 (0.0)	0.0 (0.0)	0.0 (0.0)	0.0 (0.0)	0.0 (0.0)	0.1 (0.0)	5.6 (2.2)	22.0 (8.7)	93.1 (36.7)
Average precipitation days (≥ 0.2 mm)	12.5	10.8	11.2	12.5	12.2	12.0	10.4	11.5	13.0	13.0	14.3	13.0	146.4
Average rainy days (≥ 0.2 mm)	5.5	5.3	8.0	11.8	12.2	12.0	10.4	11.5	13.0	13.0	12.7	7.4	122.7
Average snowy days (≥ 0.2 cm)	7.8	6.3	4.0	1.1	0.0	0.0	0.0	0.0	0.0	0.1	2.1	6.5	27.9
Source: Environment Canada

== Attractions ==
Clarington is home to five Christmas parades. It has more Santa Claus/Christmas parades than any other town-sized municipality in Canada. The parades are run in: Bowmanville, Newcastle, Courtice, Orono, and Enniskillen/Tyrone. The latter parade is organized by "T.H.E.E. Farmer's Parade of Lights", which is a special Christmas parade put on by the farmers from the communities of Tyrone, Haydon, Enniskillen and Enfield.

Enniskillen, which is located in the northern part of Clarington, was the birthplace of Samuel McLaughlin. Mr. McLaughlin started the McLaughlin Motor Car Co. in 1904 and was one of the first major automobile manufacturers in Canada, which evolved into General Motors of Canada. Enniskillen is home to the Enniskillen General Store which opened in 1840 and stills operates today.

Clarington is home to Jungle Cat World.

Clarington Museums & Archives is the local museum in the municipality.

Clarington is home to Camp 30, a World War II Prisoner-of-war camp, and located on Lambs Road, in Bowmanville.

Clarington is also home to Brimacombe, a ski resort located near Kirby, Ontario.

Clarington is home to Darlington Provincial Park, which is located in Darlington.

=== Bowmanville Zoo ===
Clarington was home to the Bowmanville Zoo, until its closure in 2016. The Clarington Family Outdoor Adventure Park occupied the same property as the former Bowmanville Zoo lands for several years under the same ownership, until closure. As of 2022, the Township is working with volunteers at Valley 2000 to convert the Zoo grounds into a town park, with trails connecting the surrounding housing areas.

=== Canadian Tire Motorsport Park ===
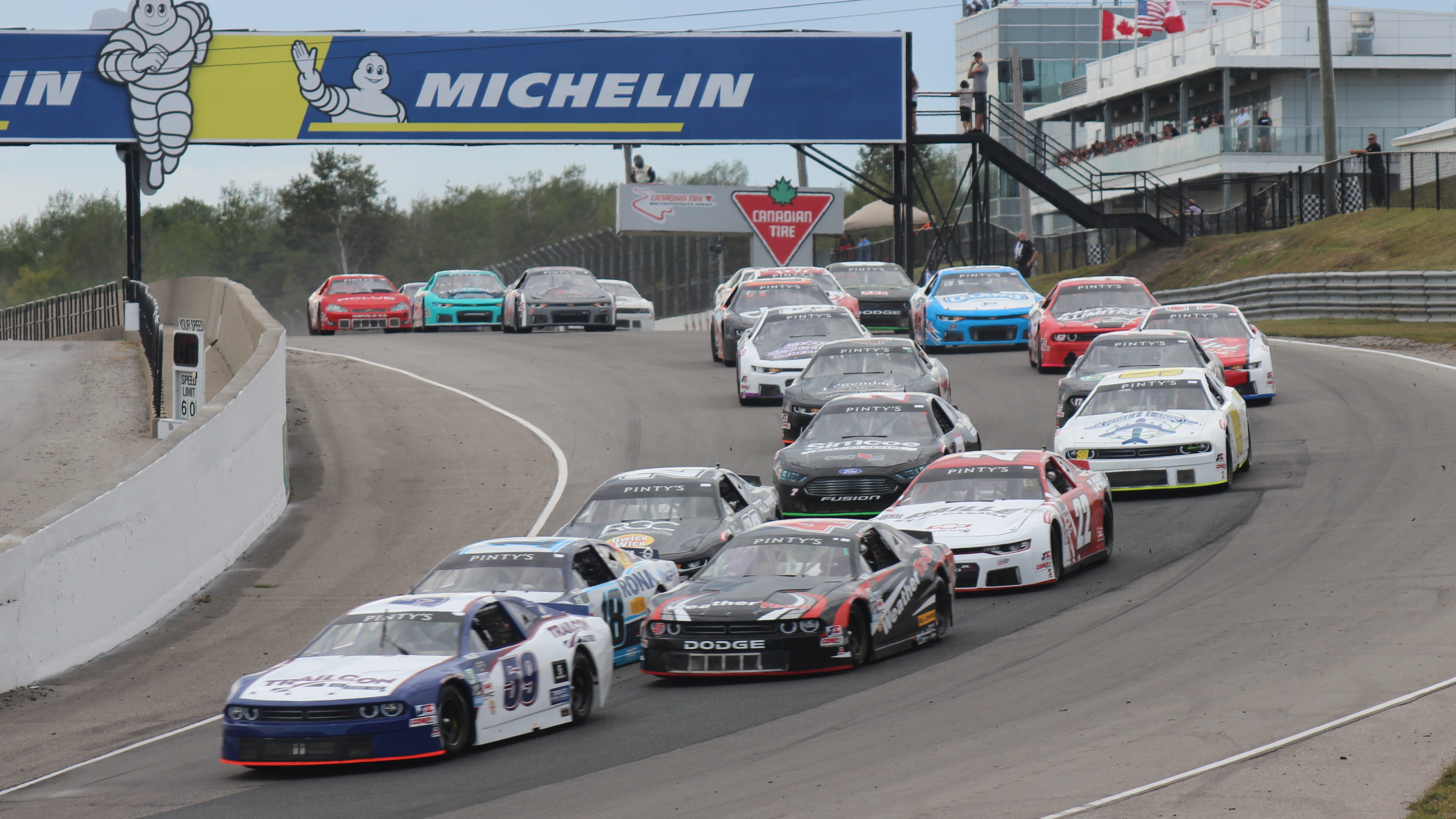
NASCAR Pinty's Series taking place at the park in 2021.

A major attraction in the municipality is the Canadian Tire Motorsport Park (formerly Mosport Park), a multi-track facility located north of Bowmanville that features a 2.459-mile (4.0 km), 10-turn road course; a half-mile paved oval; a 2.4 km advanced driver and race driver training facility and a 1.4 km kart track (Mosport International Karting). It was also a host of the Canadian Grand Prix of Formula One before the event was moved to a circuit in Montreal in the 1970s.

Canadian Tire Motorsport Park (CTMP) was also the location of three major music festivals held between 1970 and 1980. The Strawberry Fields Festival held August 7–9, 1970 featured Alice Cooper, Jethro Tull, Grand Funk Railroad, Procol Harum, Ten Years After, Lighthouse, Crowbar and Sly and the Family Stone. John Lennon was to be the headline act, bidding to gain exposure for his peace campaign, but after months of planning he backed out due to differences with the show's promoter. However, the event still used the title of The Beatles' 1967 single of the same name. Led Zeppelin were booked to play but also backed out.

Canada Jam was held August 26, 1978 and the Heatwave Festival was held August 23, 1980.

CTMP was home to Republic Live's Boots and Hearts Music Festival, which first opened in the summer of 2012. In 2015, the event was abruptly moved to Burl's Creek Event Grounds, near Barrie.

== Notable residents ==
- Ken Davies, ice hockey player
- Samuel McLaughlin, businessman and philanthropist
- John Mutton, former mayor and controversial "Mr. X" of the Greenbelt scandal

== See also ==
- List of townships in Ontario
