= Salem, Durham Regional Municipality, Ontario =

Salem
- Locality
- Location in southern Ontario
- Coordinates: 43°57′07″N 78°43′04″W
- Country: Canada
- Province: Ontario
- Regional Municipality: Durham
- Municipality: Clarington
- Elevation: 172 m (564 ft)
- Time zone: UTC-5 (Eastern Time Zone)
  - Summer (DST): UTC-4 (Eastern Time Zone)
- Postal Code FSA: L1C
- Area codes: 905, 289, 365

Salem is a locality and unincorporated place in the municipality of Clarington, Regional Municipality of Durham, in the Greater Toronto Area of Ontario, Canada.
