= Mitchell's Corners, Ontario =

Mitchell's Corners
- Location within Regional Municipality of Durham Location within Southern Ontario Location within Canada
- Coordinates: 43°56′59″N 78°48′19″W
- Country: Canada
- Province: Ontario
- Regional Municipality: Durham
- Municipality: Clarington
- Elevation: 187 m (614 ft)
- Time zone: UTC-5 (EST)
  - Summer (DST): UTC-4 (EDT)

Mitchell's Corners is a dispersed rural community in the municipality of Clarington, Ontario, Canada, directly north of Courtice, at the intersection of Trulls Road and Taunton Rd. It was named after the early settlers to the area.

Since 1979 the official name has been "Mitchell's Corners", though the locals prefer the original name "Mitchell Corners" as it appears on the signs entering the hamlet. The telephone prefixes are part of Oshawa's telephone directory.

== Buildings ==
- The former one-room schoolhouse at the NW corner has been converted into a bakery/coffee shop.
- The junior public school that replaced the one-room schoolhouse has been closed and converted into a Baptist church housing Carriage Country Baptist Church.
- The Zion United Church was constructed in 1849 on the hill at the Northern end of the village and was de-consecrated in December 2010. The Zion cemetery behind the church still remains active. As of September 2, 2015, Community Baptist Church of Durham purchased the building and has resumed using the building for religious services.

== In film ==
- In the 1960s a film studio was set up on the southern end of the village in a converted barn. It was called the Canukr Film Studios and many Ukrainian, Canadian and Urdu productions were shot here. Parts of the 1974 horror film, Deranged, were filmed in the studio and in the wooded creek area to the south and west of the studio lot.
- Parts of the 1971 biker film, The Proud Rider, were shot in the studio and other areas of Courtice and Oshawa.
