= Courtice =

- Unincorporated community
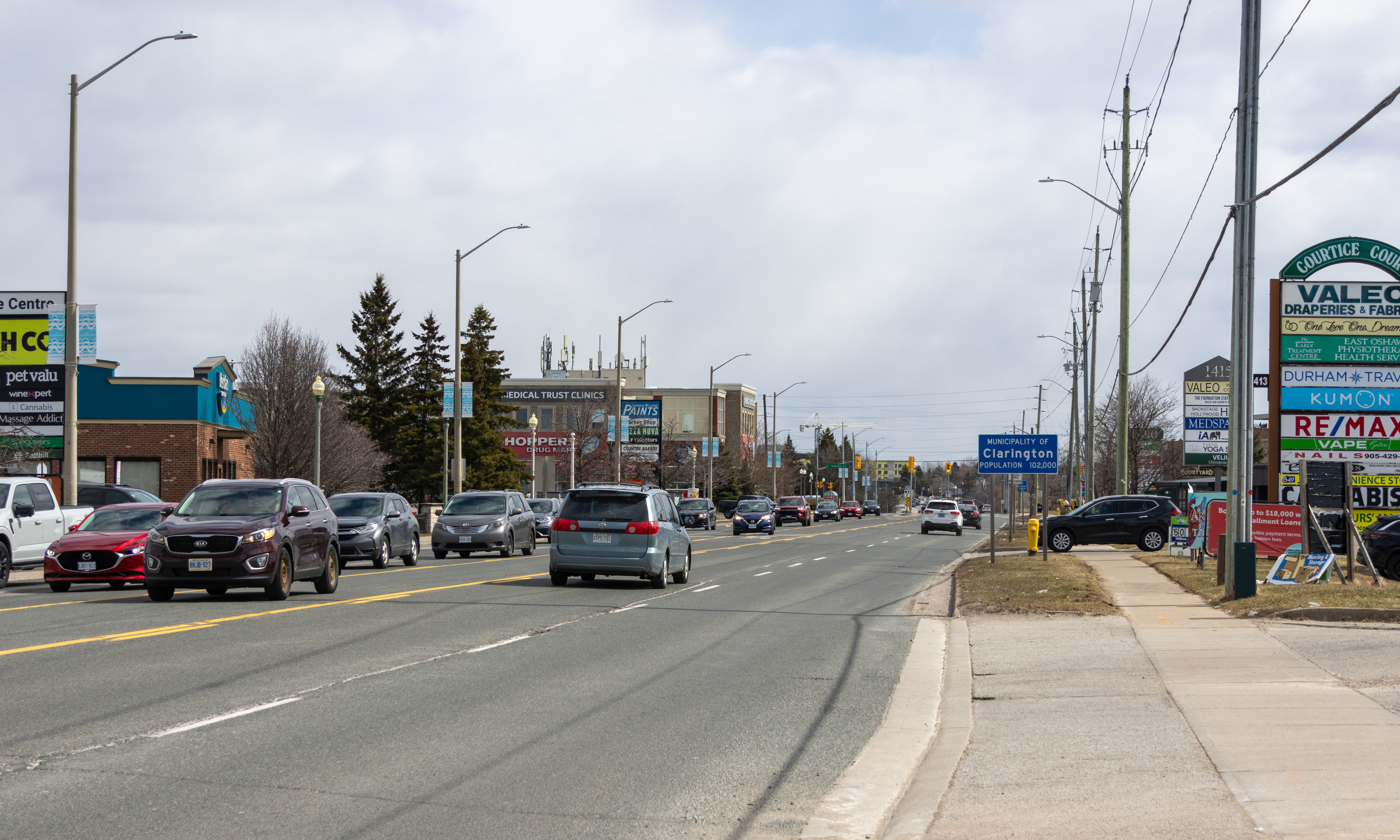
- King Street East in Courtice
- Etymology: Named for Courtice family
- Interactive map of Courtice
- Coordinates: 43°54′42″N 78°46′41″W
- Country: Canada
- Province: Ontario
- Regional municipality: Durham
- Municipality: Clarington
- Settled: 1795

Government
  - Mayor: Adrian Foster
  - Governing Body: Clarington Council

Area
  - Total: 12.51 km^{2} (4.83 sq mi)
- Elevation: 105 m (344 ft)

Population (2021)
  - Total: 22,893
  - Density: 1,829.9/km^{2} (4,739/sq mi)
- Time zone: UTC-5 (EST)
  - Summer (DST): UTC-4 (EDT)
- Forward sortation area: L1E
- Area codes: 905 and 289
- NTS Map: 030M15
- GNBC Code: FATMW

Courtice (/ˈkɜːr.tɪs/) is a community in Ontario, Canada, about 60 km (37 mi) east of Toronto, within the Municipality of Clarington. Adjacent to Oshawa, it is west of Bowmanville, which is also part of Clarington. Courtice Road (Durham Road 34) connects with Highway 401 at Interchange 425, providing arterial access to the community. Darlington Provincial Park is located just south of Courtice.

== Geography ==
The area is bounded by Townline Rd. on the west, Hancock Rd. on the east, Pebblestone Rd. on the north and Highway 401 on the south. It is contiguous with the urban area of the neighbouring City of Oshawa, but separated by rural areas from other communities within Clarington itself; accordingly, in the Canada 2011 Census, Courtice was counted as part of the population centre of Oshawa rather than Bowmanville or Newcastle.

== History ==
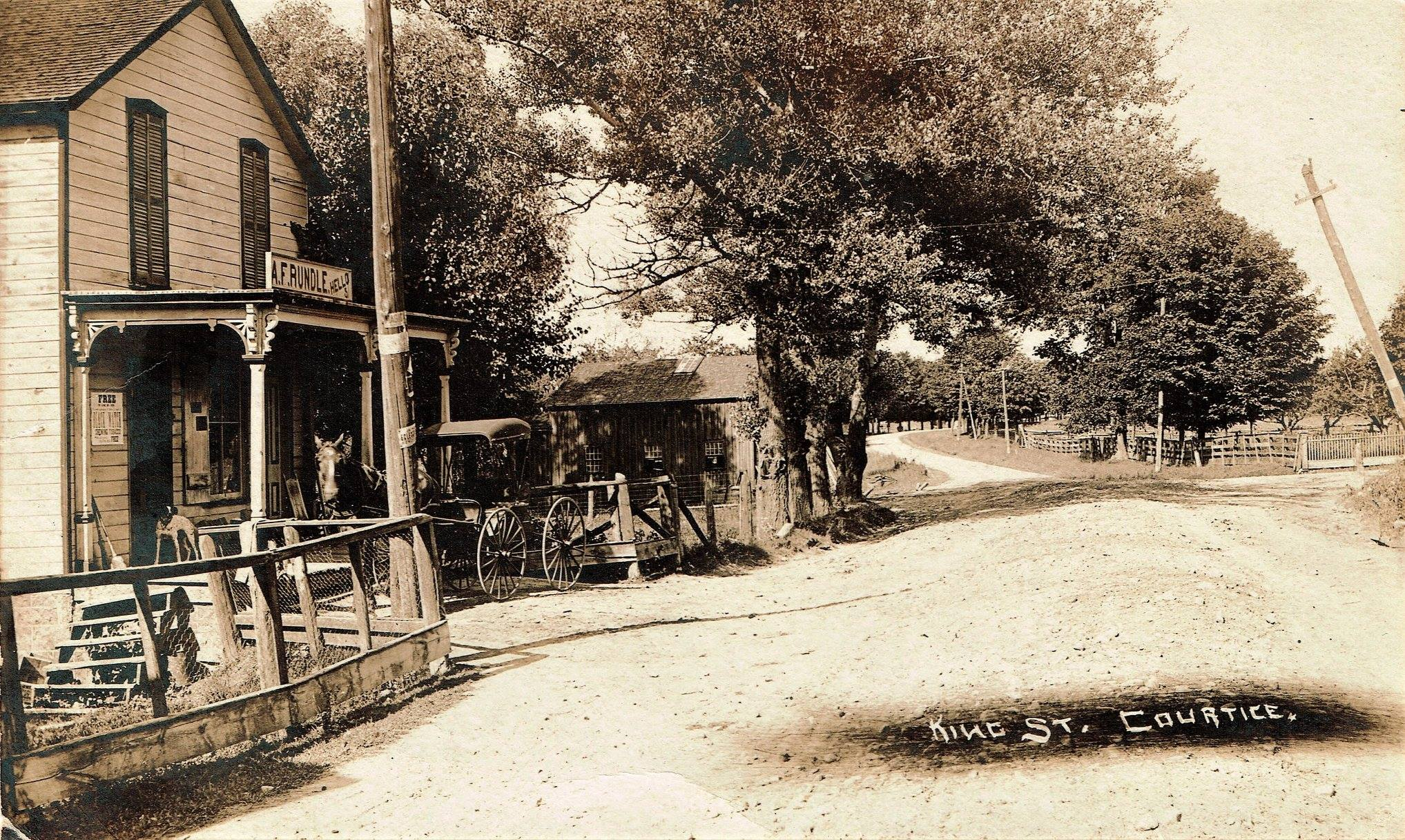
King Street in Courtice, circa 1908

The area was first settled by Europeans in 1794 by the Burk and Trulls families. Courtice, however, takes its name from another one of the early families who settled the area. Thomas Courtice arrived in Darlington Township in 1831, followed by his brothers Christopher and James in 1833. The family emigrated from Putford Bridge, Devonshire, England. The community was centred on the Ebenezer Church/Schoolhouse which was erected in the 1850s. For a while the growing settlement was called "Ebenezer", and as it grew it would eventually encompass another hamlet called "Short's Corners". Short's Corners was located at King St. E (Highway 2) and Courtice Rd. George Short owned the blacksmith shop there where today Roy Nichols Motors sits. This became downtown Courtice. Across the street on the north side of Highway 2 was where A.F. Rundles' Market was built in 1860. Beside it on the east was James Courtice's carpenter shop, built in 1874; and on the west was the Post office run by John Walter in 1908. Just west of the Post office was the old Methodist Church. All of these buildings were torn down when Highway 2 was widened in 1988. The present NW corner of Courtice Rd. and Highway 2, where a townhouse complex sits, is where the Courtice Cheese factory and shop was located. Across the street at the present day auto body shop there used to be a wagon maker's shop.

Just to the west of Courtice was a neighbouring hamlet called Prestonvale (today part of Courtice). It was once called Black's Hill and in 1825 was the site of the first post office in Darlington Township located just east of today's Critical Hit Gaming Lounge. The postmaster was none other than Colonel James Black, the originator of the name. It was also later called Tooley's Hill after Augustus Tooley who ran the grist mill at Kingston Road where Farewell Creek crosses underneath Highway 2 (presently located across the road from the Tim Horton's). The children of Prestonvale went to a school (Section #8) called Mount Carswell located on the north side of Concession 3 (now Nash Rd), just west of Trulls Rd on James Reynolds' farmstead. Alf Wilborn ran the blacksmith shop at the corner of Kingston Rd. and Prestonvale Rd. A sawmill existed on the north side of Nash Rd. just to the east of Farewell Creek, where you can see an old bridge just to the north of the present day bridge. This property was the farmstead of William Scott. Across the street from the school was the Temperance Hall located on A.V. Scott's property.

A post office with the name "Courtice" was finally established in the mid 19th century, and rail connections became available on both the Canadian Pacific and Grand Trunk main lines which passed south of the village closer to Lake Ontario. Courtice remained primarily a small rural village well into the 20th century, but housing developments beginning in the mid-1980s caused the community to grow rapidly. In 1988 Highway 2 was widened from its 2 lanes to its present 5 lanes. By the mid-1990s growth had slowed somewhat, although new housing developments are continuing and the area remains popular due to relatively low prices. Housing is primarily single-family detached residential, and most residents travel to Toronto or points west in Durham Region for employment. Commercial development is centred along Highway 2, with particular concentrations at the intersections with Townline Road (at the boundary with Oshawa) and Courtice Road.

== Postal history ==
After the War of 1812 the first post office was set up at Black's Hill (later called Prestonvale) by Colonel James Black. It serviced the settlers in the Courtice area as well. The first mail carrier was William Mulligan, who did deliveries in the area with the aid of his mule. Mulligan's mule lived until 1863. The first post office by the new name "Courtice" was established in 1882 when Mr. C.W. Lewis received the contract as its first postmaster. In 1908 John Smith took over the post and the Walter family continued on as postmasters until 1963 when the post office was finally closed. The post office was located on the north side Highway 2 just west of Courtice Rd. It was demolished when Highway 2 was widened to 5 lanes in 1988.

With the closure of the post office mail operations from Bowmanville set up Courtice's mail delivery on RR2 and RR3 Bowmanville and later an RR6 was established as Courtice grew.

With the increased housing developments in the area by the late 1980s and early 1990s, the residents of Courtice had already asked for a new postal address and community identity. The Town of Newcastle (now Clarington, Ontario) authorized Canada Post to provide the new postal identity and establish Courtice's boundaries. Today, all mail for Courtice is handled by the Durham East depot (Oshawa).

== Demographics ==
In 2021, Courtice had a population of 22,893, a 2.9% increase from the 2016 population of 22,252

Courtice consists of census tracts of 5320202.04, 5320202.05, 5320202.08, 5320202.09, 5320202.12, 5320202.17

Census Tract	2021 Population	2016 Population	Land Area (km2)	Population Density (km2)
5320202.4	6,248	5,830	2.2	2,834.6
5320202.5	5,335	5,444	1.71	3,112.4
5320202.8	3,256	3,009	3.03	1,076.2
5320202.9	3,359	3,205	2	1,683.7
5320202.12	2,455	2,525	1.45	1,691.0
5320202.17	2,240	2,239	2.12	1,055.6

== Education ==
Public education is controlled by the Kawartha Pine Ridge District School Board through five elementary and one secondary school, while the Peterborough Victoria Northumberland and Clarington Catholic District School Board controls Catholic education through three elementary and one secondary school. The schools include:

Elementary schools:

- Courtice North Public School
- Dr. Emily Stowe Public School
- Dr. G.J. MacGillivray Public School
- S.T. Worden Public School
- Mother Teresa Catholic Elementary School
- Good Shepherd Catholic Elementary School
- Monsignor Leo Cleary Catholic Elementary School
- Courtice Intermediate School (grades 7&8)
- Lydia Trull Public School

Secondary schools:

- Courtice Secondary School
- Holy Trinity Catholic Secondary School

== Sports and recreation ==
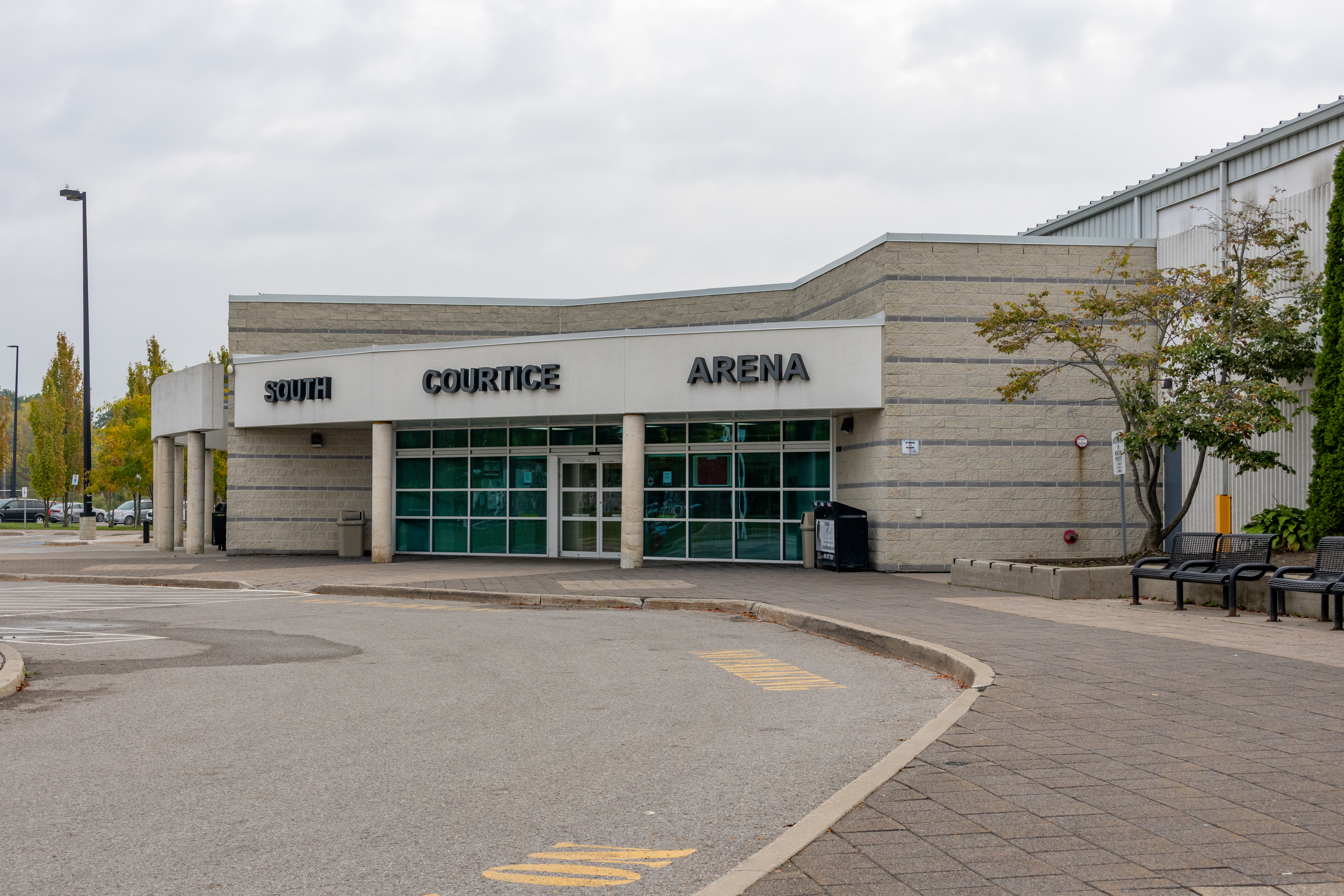
Entrance to the South Courtice Arena

The South Courtice Arena opened in the fall of 2003. It has two ice rinks: one Olympic sized and the other NHL sized. It also has an NFL-sized turf field in behind the arena. It is home to the Clarington Speed Skating Club. The Courtice Community Complex includes a large indoor pool optimized for family and lap swimming, a separate wading pool for children, a large water-slide, sauna, hot-tub, weight and training facilities and numerous meeting rooms. The same complex also houses a branch of the Clarington library.

== Transportation ==
Public transit bus service is provided by Durham Region Transit and GO Transit. GO Transit has begun work to extend the Lakeshore East commuter train line to Bowmanville which includes a train station in Courtice.

Courtice Road (Durham Road 34) connects with Highway 401 at Interchange 425.

== Residents of note ==
- Tom Gibney, CFTO television anchor
- Greg Nemisz, two-time Memorial Cup champion (RW), drafted 25th overall in 2008 by the Calgary Flames; currently assistant coach for the Oshawa Generals.
- Ricky Foley, starting defensive end for the Saskatchewan Roughriders.
- Matthew Morison, a Courtice Secondary School alumni and Canadian National team snowboarder
- Joel A. Sutherland, author of Frozen Blood and Be a Writing Superstar!
- Noah Jensen, professional soccer player for Forge FC

== In film ==
At the north end of Courtice, heading towards Mitchell's Corners, Ontario, stood a film studio called Canukr Films. It was built within a converted barn. Canadian, Ukrainian and Urdu movies were produced here in the 1960s and 1970s. A Ukrainian town site was also built in conjunction with Canukr on the property:

- The horror film, Deranged, was produced here in 1974. The chase scenes were done at Pebblestone Rd. and Farewell Creek.
- An episode of Littlest Hobo called Day for Fright was shot within the remains of the Ukrainian village and at the studio in 1982.
- As well, the 1971 biker film, The Proud Rider, starring Art Hindle and Oshawa's Satan's Choice, was shot in many Courtice locations. These include: Darlington Provincial Park, Courtice Road at the CN bridge overpass and along Baseline Road.

== Nearest places ==
- Oshawa, west
- Bowmanville, east

== See also ==
- Kingsway Village (Oshawa)
