= The Bowmanville Merchant =

Canadian newspaper

- Type: Weekly newspaper
- Founder: Cephas Barker
- Founded: 1869
- Ceased publication: 1884
- City: Bowmanville, Ontario

The Bowmanville Merchant was a weekly newspaper published in Bowmanville, Ontario from 1869 to 1884.

== History ==
A lifelong Methodist, Cephas Barker was born in 1818 in Chatham, Kent County, to a devout Baptist father. He came to Bowmanville in 1867 after leaving Ontario in 1856, having spent years in the navy and nearly a decade as a Superintendent Minister on Prince Edward Island.

Barker was the manager of the Merchant, which had a circulation of 1,000 in the townships of Darlington, Clarke and Cartwright, publishing on Fridays with a 75 cent per annum fee for subscription. Paul Trebilcock was the editor, a stationer and bookseller as Barker was. Trebilcock was also a member of YMCA and an agent for Travellers Insurance. Trebilcock continued to operate as a book and recreation goods seller with ads in the succeeding publication to the Merchant, the Canadian Statesman. Trebilcock’s son Arthur J. would be best known as president of the Toronto Stock Exchange, retiring in 1958 at the age of 70. Arthur was the son of Paul and his wife Christina, who married in 1875. Local event listings in the Canadian Statesman have Paul Trebilcock still alive in 1922.

The paper generally contained a number of front page columns devoted to literature, poetry, letters to the editor, tips for the farm and household, and plenty of columns for advertisements, including Barker’s own “People Book Store and Sabbath School Depot.” Barker was also a member of the Board of Trustees for the town, where reports of his meetings published in the Merchant regularly showed the liberal leaning Barker clashing with the Conservative John McClung.

The paper itself did not have specific columns reporting on the events of other communities, but is an excellent source of examples for advertising, goods and services, and illustrated classifieds of the time. Literature generally had a number of columns devoted to it on the front page, as well as international topics and provincial news.

Three years before the Merchant began, Barker was editor and publisher of The Observer, an eight page Bible Christian denominational newspaper. Paul Trebilcock also acted as foreman for that paper when it was being printed in the Horsey Block. As well as running the West Durham Steam Printing House, Barker sold books and goods from his King Street office. One such book is History of the Early Settlement of Bowmanville and Vicinity by John T. Coleman, printed 1875 and regarding history and zoology of the region.

Barker held his position for 14 years until being succeeded by H. John Nott, though he only published for three more years until July 1, 1884. This was due to a $55,000 deficit, possibly incurred by a saturated marketplace of Methodist papers. Cephas was married to Elizabeth Barker, whose obituary he printed in the March 12th, 1875 issue. Barker’s own funeral took place on November 16, 1881, in London, Ontario, and was attended by many of his fellow Bible Christians, five years after the Merchant had been absorbed by the Canadian Statesman.

== See also ==
- List of newspapers in Canada
