= Kirby, Ontario =

Coordinates: 44.012°N 78.610°W

Location of Kirby in Ontario

Kirby is a rural hamlet located in the Municipality of Clarington in Durham Region in Ontario, Canada. On Highway 35/115, it is north of Orono, approximately a 45-minute drive east of Toronto. The community is named for Kirkby, North Yorkshire.

The hamlet also features the Kirby United Church, although services are not held there anymore.

== Schools ==
Kirby Public School was the elementary school in the area. In 2017, Kirby School was absorbed by Orono Public School after the board voted to close the school in Kirby. The building remains used by the school board.
