= Starkville, Ontario =

Starkville
- Dispersed rural community
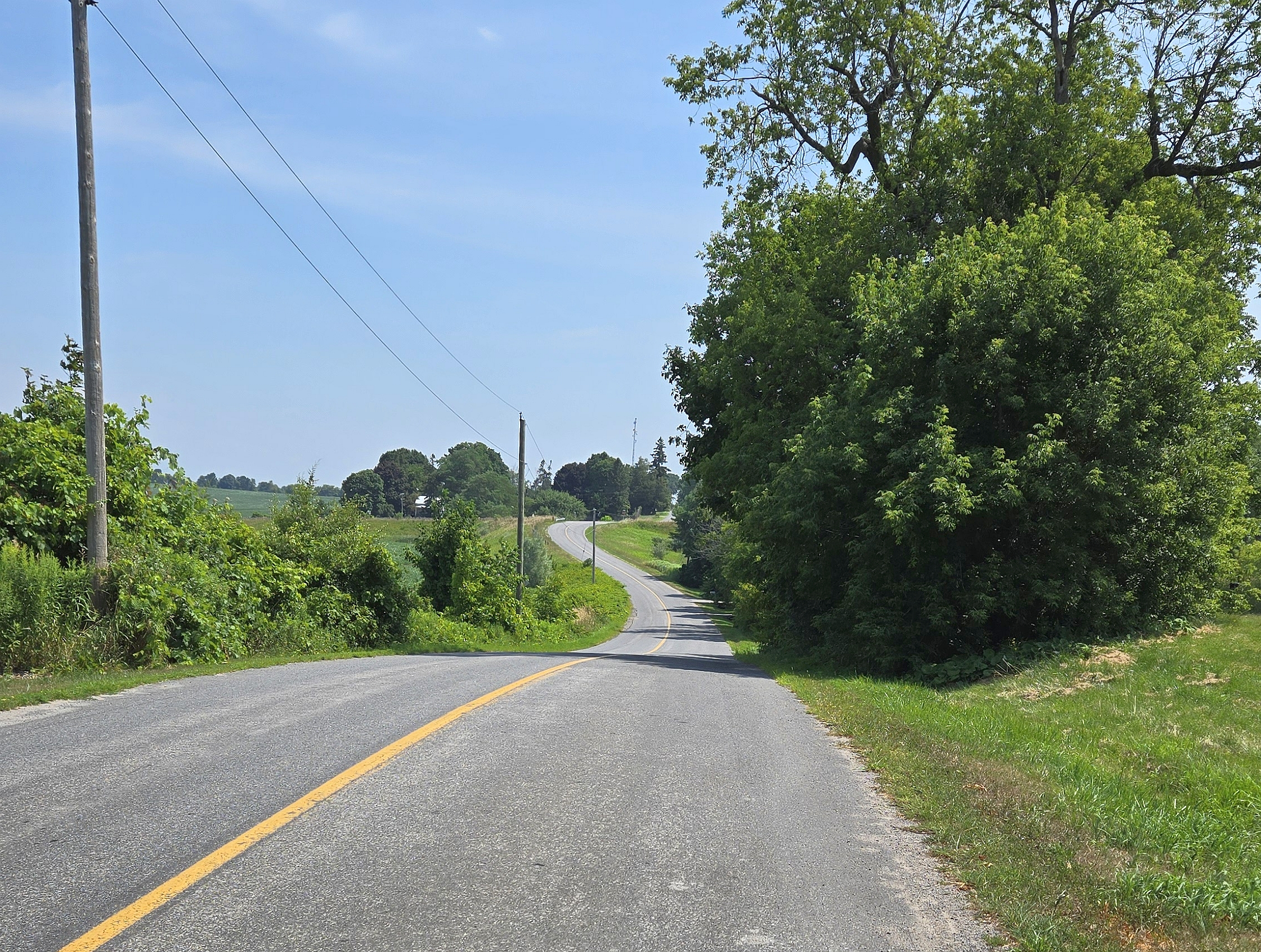
- Concession Road 5 in Starkville

- Location within Regional Municipality of Durham Location within Southern Ontario
- Coordinates: 43°59′35″N 78°30′52″W
- Country: Canada
- Province: Ontario
- Regional municipality: Durham Region
- Municipality: Clarington
- Time zone: UTC-5 (Eastern (EST))
  - Summer (DST): UTC-4 (EDT)
- GNBC Code: FCSAG

Starkville is a dispersed rural community in Clarington, Durham Region, Ontario, Canada.

== History ==
William and Mary Stark were early settlers, immigrating from Scotland in 1842.

Starkville Post Office opened in 1882, and remained open until 1928. Starkville School opened in 1902.

The population in 1896 was approximately 45.

A branch of the Federated Women's Institutes of Ontario was located in Starkville from 1906 to 1923.

Starkville Station was located 1 mile (1.6 km) south of Starkville, along a now-abandoned branch of the Canadian Northern Railway.
