= Hampton, Ontario =

Hampton
- Unincorporated community
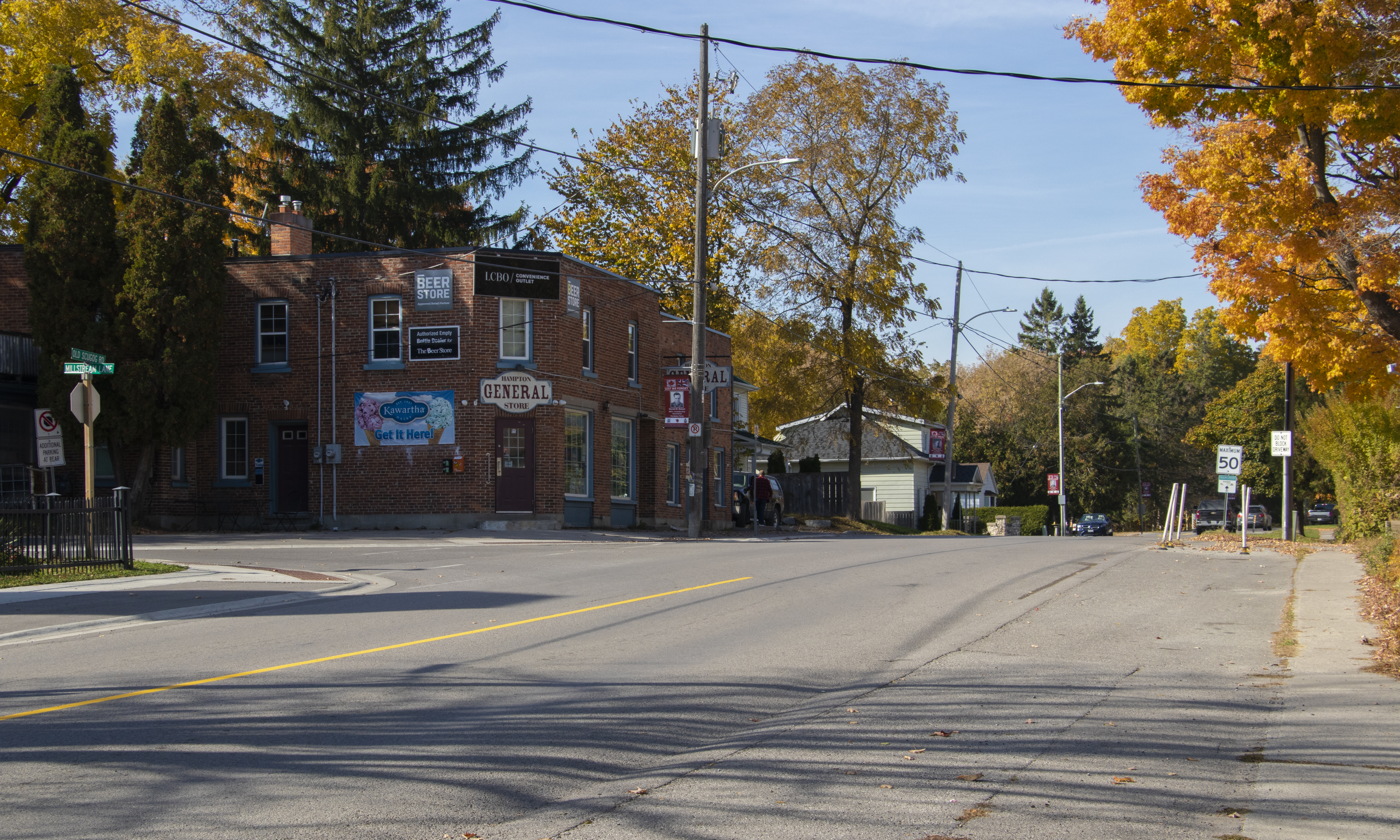
- Old Scugog Road, Hampton
- Interactive map of Hampton
- Coordinates: 43°58′14″N 78°44′37″W
- Country: Canada
- Province: Ontario
- Regional municipality: Durham
- Municipality: Clarington
- Time zone: UTC-5 (EST)
  - Summer (DST): UTC-4 (EDT)
- Forward sortation area: L0B 1J0
- Area codes: 905 and 289
- NTS Map: 30M15 Oshawa
- GNBC Code: FBLND

Hampton is a community located in the municipality of Clarington, Ontario, Canada. It was the location of the offices of Darlington Township until 1974 when it became part of the newly created Town of Newcastle (now Clarington) as part of the municipal government restructuring that created the Regional Municipality of Durham.

Hampton was founded by Henry Elliot in 1840, who opened the first mill here in the former Darlington Township. At first it was called Elliot's Mill and by 1848 just Millsville. Other former names have included Hog's Hollow and Shantytown. The Elliott home backed onto the pond and is one of the most historic properties in the Billings. With the opening of the post office the name Hampton was chosen, as it was an abbreviation of Henry Elliot's birthplace, Kirkhampton in Cornwall, England.

== Demographics ==
In the 2021 Census of Population conducted by Statistics Canada, Hampton had a population of 775 living in 272 of its 276 total private dwellings, a change of 2.6% from its 2016 population of 755. With a land area of 1.23 km^{2} (0.47 sq mi), it had a population density of 630.1/km^{2} (1,631.9/sq mi) in 2021.

== Hampton Post office history ==
The first post office in Hampton was opened in 1851. At that time, the name of the village was Millsville, but the name was changed with the opening of the post office. Henry Elliott served as its first Postmaster. His son, Henry Jr., took over the position until 1915 (except for a short period around 1895), when Mr. W.W. Horn was appointed. During this period, the post office was located on the east side of town at Horn's store (later destroyed by fire in 1983).

In 1937, the post office was moved to Barron's store across the street. Finally, in 1971 the post office was moved to the federal building at its present location on Millville Avenue (then known as Temperance Street), with Pete Barron as Postmaster. Pete, a jazz enthusiast, and his wife Gladys also owned and operated the General Store and lived above the store. For many years, Marguerite (Chic) Richardson was the Assistant Postmaster. Mrs. Nancy Pella became Postmistress in 1982. Mrs. Pella retired in 2011. Mrs. Heather Garvock is the current Postmaster.

Today, it services the village with lock boxes and two rural routes. One of these rural routes came into being with the closure of the Enniskillen post office in 1986.

== Hampton Community Association ==
The Hampton Community Association (HCA) is a non-profit, volunteer-based organization that manages the Hampton Community Hall (also known as the Hampton Community Centre) and organizes local community events in Hampton. The purpose of the HCA board and volunteers is to encourage community participation, provide a gathering space for Hampton residents, promote the rental of the community hall to help make it financially self-sustaining, and to be representative of as many facets of the community as possible.

The HCA board consists of a chair, vice chair, treasurer, secretary, eight members-at-large, and additional volunteers. The board meets monthly at the hall, and meetings are open to the public. Once a year in January, the HCA holds its Annual General Meeting (AGM) at the Hampton Community Hall. The meeting includes discussions on community matters, a question-and-answer session, elections for open positions, and any necessary revisions or updates to the HCA constitution. Special guests, including the Mayor of Clarington and members of Clarington Council, are often in attendance.

== In film ==
- In 2005 Stephen King's 11.22.63 TV series starring James Franco was filmed in Hampton and Enniskillen. Old Scugog Rd. North of Hampton was used all the way to and including Hampton Auto Care garage that was converted to gas station south of the cemetery, also a scene was filmed on King Lane dirt road heading towards Holt Road.
- The 2002 John Q film's baseball scene was filmed in Hampton, Ontario.
- In 1982 an episode of The Littlest Hobo, titled "Trooper", was filmed in Hampton, Ontario. The Hampton Junior Public school as well as a local house were used as settings. The town itself representing the evacuated town of Middleton. Several children from the school were used as extras.
- The 1971 biker film, The Proud Rider, was partially filmed outside the Hampton United Church during the film's final scene.
