= Jungle Cat World =

- Interactive map of Jungle Cat World
- 43°59′37″N 78°36′28″W
- Date opened: 1983
- Location: Orono, Ontario
- No. of animals: 178
- No. of species: 60
- Website: www.junglecatworld.com

Jungle Cat World, originally named "Orono Exotic Cat World," is a wildlife park that was established in 1983. It is located in Orono, Ontario, Canada, approximately 45 minutes east of Toronto off of Highway 35/115. Jungle Cat World is open year round and is home to more than 150 animals.

The zoo has faced accusations of mistreatment of their animals by the World Animal Protection Association and other animal rights organizations.

The park was formerly accredited by the Canadian Association of Zoos and Aquariums (CAZA) and the World Association of Zoos and Aquariums (WAZA).

== Features ==
Jungle Cat World's Night Safari Program is for guides and scouts. It is a guided tour around the wildlife park at night, animal presentations and sleepover in the cabins. This allows the public an opportunity to observe some of the activities of the nocturnal animals. "Behind the Scenes" is a private forty-five-minute program with an Animal Coordinator. It offers hands on experience and a photo opportunity with three of the animals at the zoo. Jungle Cat World also has a bed and breakfast lodge.

=== Safari Zoo Camp ===
Jungle Cat World has offered an overnight summer camp called Safari Zoo Camp since 1995. Between the end of June and the end of August, approximately 300 campers, from ages 6 to 17, come each year to experience one of the nine Zoo Camp sessions. Situated on the Jungle Cat World property, the campground and sleeping quarters are located outside of the zoo's perimeter. Safari Zoo Camp allows campers to gain hands-on experience zoo keeping and handling animals and reptiles. Senior campers have the opportunity to present and feed animals during the feeding tours and to present and handle animals at Wildlife Safari Outreach Presentations in the surrounding community. In 2011, Safari Zoo Camp was named as one of the top ten greenest summer camps in North America. The camp has also been accredited as a member of the Ontario Camps Association.

== Education ==
Jungle Cat World was founded as a tourist attraction to show exotic animals, primarily for recreation. Over the years, the park has taken a much more active role in educating visitors. Every day, a zookeeper leads an educational feeding tour around the wildlife park, during which the large cats, wolves, and primates are fed.

== Accusations of Animal mistreatment ==
In 2018, the park lost its WAZA accreditation after resigning from the Canadian Association of Accredited Zoos and Aquariums following an inspection.

One animal has escaped from the zoo in the past. In 2011, a wolf escaped and was shot by a local resident.
