= Newtonville, Ontario =

Newtonville
- Unincorporated community
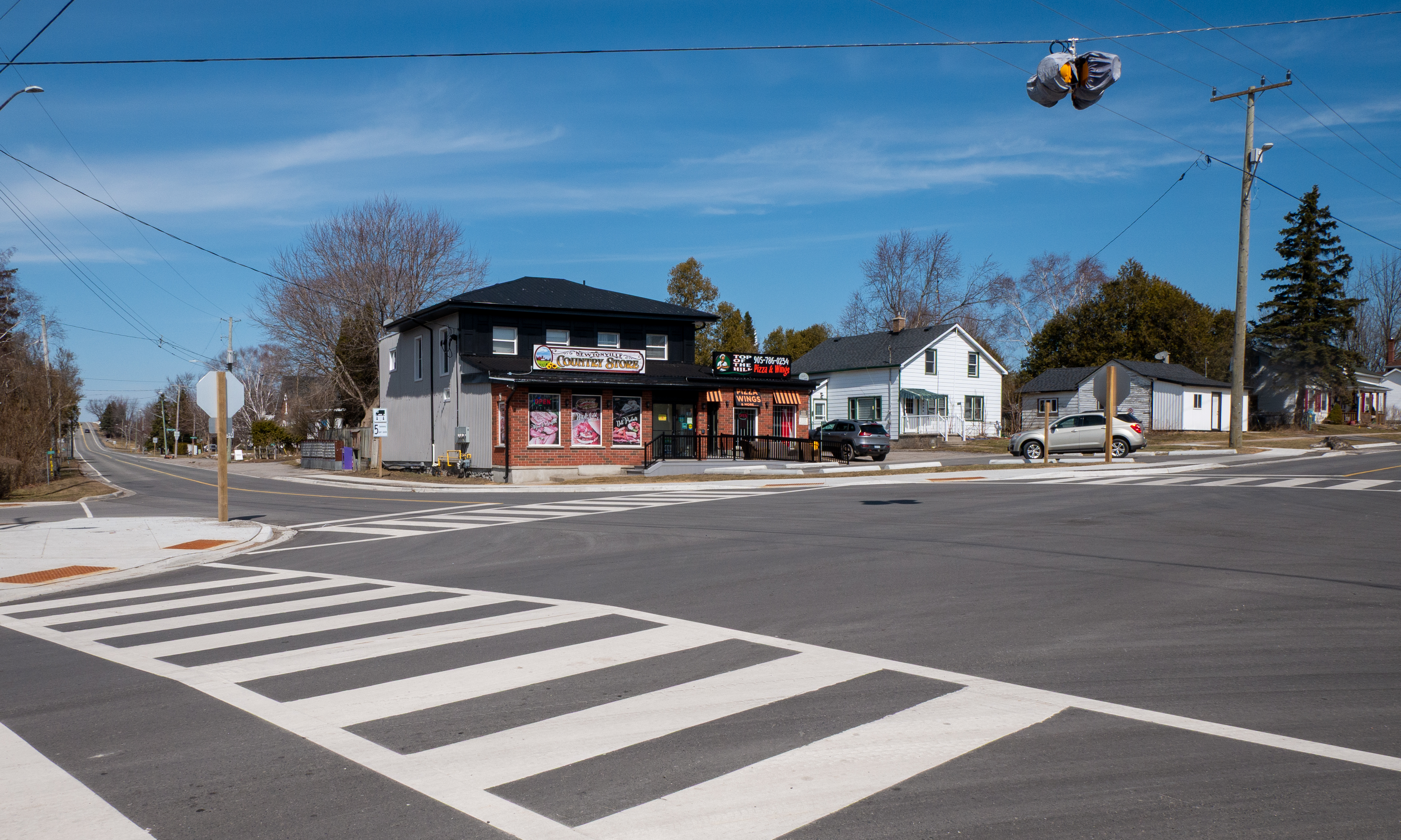
- Highway 2, Newtonville
- Interactive map of Newtonville
- Coordinates: 43°56′21″N 78°29′33″W
- Country: Canada
- Province: Ontario
- Regional municipality: Durham
- Municipality: Clarington
- Elevation: 150 m (490 ft)

Population (2016)
  - Total: 576
- Time zone: UTC-5 (EST)
  - Summer (DST): UTC-4 (EDT)
- Forward sortation area: L0A 1J0
- Area codes: 905 and 289
- NTS Map: 030M16
- GNBC Code: FDORQ

Newtonville is a dispersed rural community in the Municipality of Clarington, Durham Region, Ontario, Canada. It is located about 30 kilometres (19 mi) east of Oshawa and about 10 kilometres (6.2 mi) west of Port Hope on the former Highway 2.

Newtonville is the most easterly community in Clarington (and in Durham Region), and therefore forms the eastern end of the Greater Toronto Area. The community was formerly part of the southeastern part of the township of Clarke until 1973.

== History ==
Newtonville's first Post office opened in 1835 when the village was known as both "Clarke" (named after Clarke Township, which it was part of) and "Newton".

== Demographics ==
In the 2021 Census of Population conducted by Statistics Canada, Newtonville had a population of 629 living in 212 of its 214 total private dwellings, a change of 9.2% from its 2016 population of 576. With a land area of 2.26 km^{2} (0.87 sq mi), it had a population density of 278.3/km^{2} (720.8/sq mi) in 2021.
