= Darlington Provincial Park =

Provincial park in Ontario, Canada

- IUCN category II (national park)
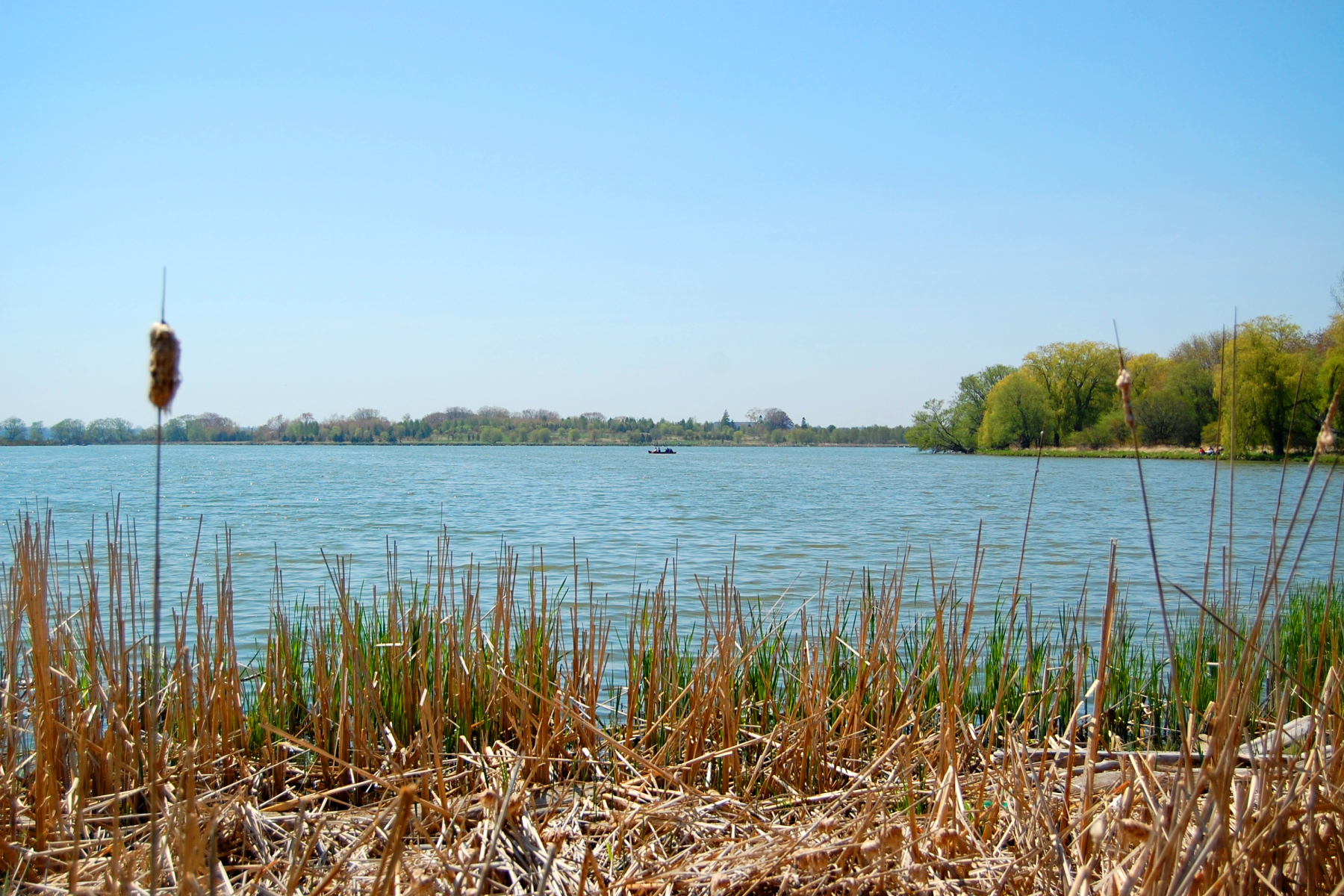
- View of McLaughlin Bay

- Location within Southern Ontario
- Interactive map of Darlington Provincial Park
- Location: Durham Region, Ontario, Canada
- Nearest city: Bowmanville, Ontario
- Coordinates: 43.873°N 78.787°W
- Area: 208 ha (510 acres)
- Established: 1959
- Visitors: 195,123 (in 2022)
- Governing body: Ontario Parks
- Website: www.ontarioparks.ca/park/darlington

Darlington Provincial Park is a provincial park in Ontario, Canada. It is located just south of Highway 401 in the city of Bowmanville. A small park, the topography is dominated by gentle hills formed by a terminal moraine deposited by glaciers at the end of the last Ice Age. The park borders on the northern shore of Lake Ontario and also encloses McLaughlin Bay. The bay is shallow and at some point in the 1990s was completely closed off from the lake by the action of the waves. The property bordering the park to the west is the home of General Motors Corporation's Canadian headquarters. Kintigh Generating Station can be seen from this provincial park even though it is on the other side of the lake in Somerset, New York.

== Park wildlife ==
Darlington Provincial Park is home to several varieties of plants and animals. The flora of the park consists mostly of second-generation regrowth, as the park was reforested in the 1960s after being cleared for farmland. Invasive plant species are a serious problem in the park, especially the aggressive purple loosestrife growing in the marshy areas bordering McLaughlin Bay. Animal species present in the park range from the white-tailed deer to squirrels and other small animals. Other animals such as coyotes and Eastern wolves have been rumored to be wandering around the park. Fish and amphibian life are also present in the park, especially in and around McLaughlin Bay. The park is known for migrating monarch butterflies.

== Monarch butterfly migration ==
Near summer's end, monarch butterflies begin to migrate south to Mexico. Monarch butterflies can often be seen flying through the park in September.

== Loyalist heritage ==
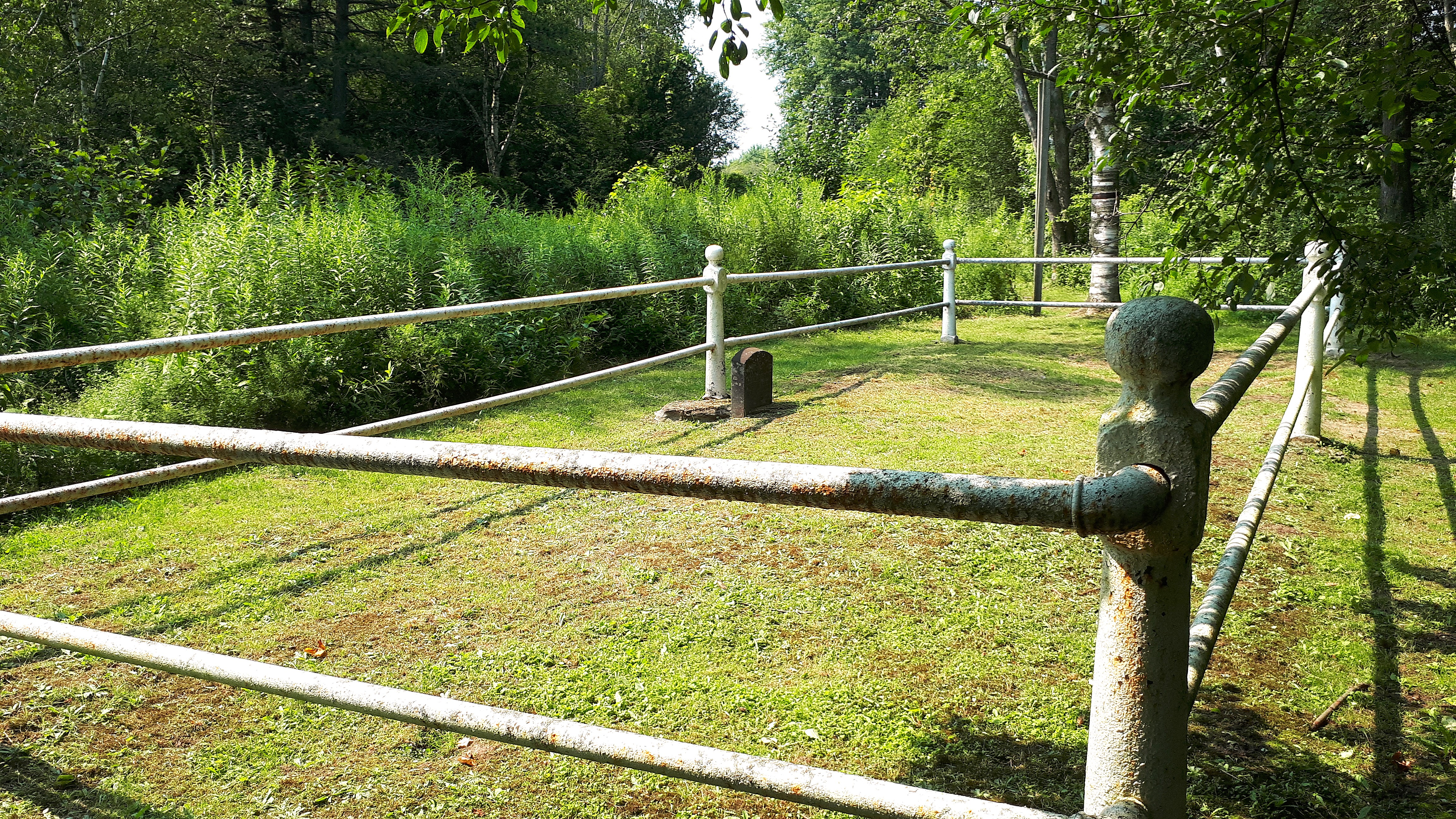
Pioneer Cemetery

This part of Canada was settled by three loyalist families in 1794; Roger Conant, John Burk and John Trull. They moved onto British soil in response to Lord Simcoe's offer of free land to the loyalists. Samuel Burk, a descendant of John Burk, purchased the land which is now the park in 1818 and resided there until his death in 1833. Located on the park property is a cemetery used by this Burk family.

== In film ==
In 1971, a notable biker movie called The Proud Rider, featuring Art Hindle, was filmed in the area. Many of the biker scenes in the film were shot inside the park, and the Darlington pioneer home can often be seen.
