= Former counties of Ontario =

The Canadian province of Ontario has several historic counties, which are past census divisions that no longer exist today. Most historic counties either merged with other counties, or became regional municipalities or single-tier municipalities. Although counties had existed prior to 1849, after 1849 they replaced the district systems in administering local government and courts in Ontario.

The county system is used in southern, southwestern and eastern sections of the province of Ontario. There are no counties in Northern Ontario due to sparse population and a long-standing boundary dispute with the Northwest Territories (that was not resolved until 1912).

== Counties ==
- Addington County (1792–1864) merged with Lennox County to form Lennox and Addington County
- Brant County (established 1852) split into the single-tier 'county' of Brant and the city of Brantford
- Carleton County (1800–1969) became the Regional Municipality of Ottawa-Carleton, now the City of Ottawa, a single-tier municipality.
- Dufferin County (established 1881) created from parts of Simcoe, Grey and Waterloo counties.
- Durham County (1792–1973) portions merged with Ontario County to form Durham Regional Municipality. Remaining portions joined Northumberland, Peterborough and Victoria Counties.
- Grenville County (1792–1850) merged with Leeds County to form Leeds and Grenville United Counties
- Kent County (1792–1998) became the single-tier Municipality of Chatham-Kent
- Haldimand County (1800–1974; 2001–present) was merged into the Regional Municipality of Haldimand-Norfolk for many years, but this was divided again with some minor adjustments to the old lines in 2001; it is now a single-tier municipality, not an official county
- Halton County (1816–1973) became Halton Regional Municipality
- Leeds County (1792–1850) merged with Grenville County to form Leeds and Grenville United Counties
- Lennox County (1792–1864) merged with Addington County to form Lennox and Addington County
- Lincoln County (1792–1970) merged with Welland County to form Niagara Regional Municipality
- Norfolk County (1792–1974) was merged into the Regional Municipality of Haldimand-Norfolk for many years, but this was divided again with some minor adjustments to the old lines in 2001; it is now a single-tier municipality, not an official county
- Ontario County a short-lived first county with this name existed from 1792 to 1800, and was split with the eastern portion joining Frontenac County and the western portion joining Addington County. The second existed from 1852 to 1973, and merged with portions of Durham County to form Durham Regional Municipality. A small portion became part of Simcoe County.
- Peel County (1851–1973) became Peel Regional Municipality
- Prescott County (1800–1820) merged with Russell County to form Prescott and Russell United Counties
- Prince Edward County (established 1792) has retained its name, but is now a single-tier municipality, not an official county
- Russell County (1800–1820) merged with Prescott County to form Prescott and Russell United Counties
- Suffolk County (1792–1800) formed in 1792 with Ontario County, in 1800 it was split into the Counties of Kent, Elgin and Middlesex. During its short existence it was made up of Delaware Township, Westminster Township, most of North Dorchester Township and the rest Indian land.
- Victoria County (1821–2001) became the City of Kawartha Lakes, a single-tier municipality.
- Welland County (1851–1970) merged with Lincoln County to form Niagara Regional Municipality
- Waterloo County (1853–1973) became Waterloo Regional Municipality in 1973
- Wentworth County (1816–1970) became Hamilton-Wentworth Regional Municipality, now the City of Hamilton, a single-tier municipality.
- York County (1792–1971) saw Metropolitan Toronto (now the City of Toronto) separate from it in 1953, and the remainder became York Regional Municipality in 1971

Various counties throughout Ontario were joined administratively in the 19th century. While many of these still exist today and have become relatively permanent, some have since been dissolved. For example, the former United Counties of Huron and Perth existed for only a few years in the 19th century. The United Counties of Northumberland and Durham, on the other hand, merged eight years after each one was created, and continued for 174 years up until the dissolution of Durham County on January 1, 1974.

== Special cases ==
Four of Ontario's electoral districts were also erroneously listed as counties of residence in some of Canada's first post-Confederation censuses. These did not exist as counties in the political sense, although they may be referred to as such in some historical and genealogical works because of their appearances in census data:

- Bothwell was made up of townships from Kent and Lambton counties.
- Cardwell was made up of townships from Simcoe and Peel counties.
- Monck was made up of townships from Lincoln, Haldimand, and Welland Counties.
- Niagara was made up of townships from Lincoln County.

The Regional Municipality of Sudbury can also be considered 'historic', as it later became the City of Greater Sudbury — however, its origins are not in county government, but as a part of the still-extant Sudbury District.

The unincorporated Patricia District, comprising the portion of Northwestern Ontario which was transferred to Ontario from the Northwest Territories in 1912, existed until 1937 when it was merged into Kenora District.

== See also ==
- List of Ontario census divisions
