= Suffolk County, Ontario =

Historical county in Ontario, Canada

Suffolk County, Ontario was a short lived county created in the first decade of Upper Canada's existence. It was found along the shores of Lake Erie east of Pointe aux Pins/Rondeau Provincial Park to the western boundary of neighbouring Norfolk County and inland until it meets the Thames River. It was located with the Western District and London District.

Formed in 1792 along with Ontario County and reorganized in 1800 with the creation of the Counties of Kent, Elgin and Middlesex.

During short existence it was made up of Delaware Township, Westminster Township, most of North Dorchester Township and the rest Indian land.

== See also ==
- Former counties of Ontario
