= Home District =

- Former District in Upper Canada
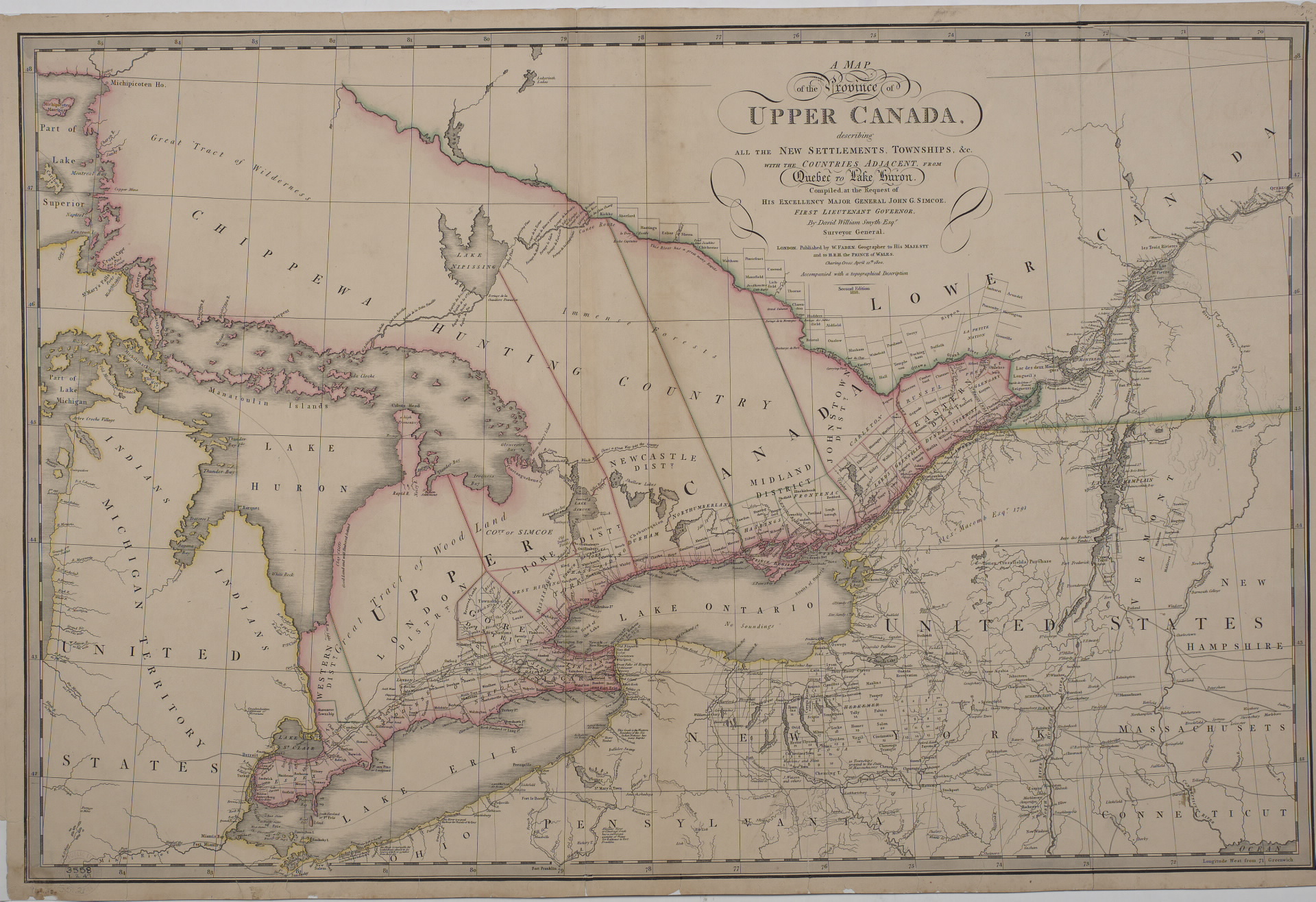
- Map of Upper Canada Identifying its districts, counties and townships (1818)
- Interactive map of Home District
- Coordinates: 44°00′N 79°30′W
- Established: 1788
- Dissolved: 1849

The Home District was one of four districts of the Province of Quebec created in 1788 in the western reaches of the Montreal District and detached in 1791 to create the new colony of Upper Canada. It was abolished with the adoption of the county system in 1849.

== Territorial evolution ==
Originally established as Nassau District in 1788, it was renamed as the "Home District" in 1792, The district was originally bounded to the east by a line running north–south from the mouth of the Trent River and to the west by a line running north–south "intersecting the extreme projection of Long Point into the lake Erie." The northern boundaries were vague and overlapping Indian land. The district town was originally Newark, later Niagara-on-the-Lake.

In 1798, the Niagara District was created from Lincoln County and Haldimand County, and the London District was formed from the counties of Middlesex, Norfolk and Oxford, both of which were detached from the Home District. The remainder was organized as follows:

Organization of the Home District (1798)
Northumberland County	Durham County	York County		Simcoe County
The townships of: Murray; Cramahé; Haldimand; Hamilton; Elmwick; Percy; Seymour; together with the peninsula of Newcastle	The townships of: Hope; Clarke; Darlington; with all the tract of land ... which lies to the southward of the small lakes above the Rice Lake, and the communication between them and the communication between the eastern boundary of the township of Hope, and the western boundary of the township of Darlington, produced north fifteen degrees west, until they intersect either of the said lakes, or the communication between them...	East Riding	The townships of: Whitby; Pickering; Scarborough; York (including its peninsula); Etobicoke; Markham; Vaughan; King; Whitchurch; Uxbridge; Gwillimbury; and the tract of land ... lying between the County Durham and the Lake Simcoe...	...Matchedash, Gloucester, or Penetanguishene, together with Prince William Henry's Island, and all the land lying between the Midland District and a line produced due north from a certain fixed boundary (at the distance of about fifty miles north-west from the outlet of Burlington Bay) till it intersects the northern limits of the Province...
The townships of: Murray; Cramahé; Haldimand; Hamilton; Elmwick; Percy; Seymour; together with the peninsula of Newcastle	The townships of: Hope; Clarke; Darlington; with all the tract of land ... which lies to the southward of the small lakes above the Rice Lake, and the communication between them and the communication between the eastern boundary of the township of Hope, and the western boundary of the township of Darlington, produced north fifteen degrees west, until they intersect either of the said lakes, or the communication between them...	West Riding	the townships of Beverley and Flamborough; so much of the tract of land upon the Grand River in the occupation of the Six Nation Indians as lies to the northward of Dundas Street; all the land between the said tract and the East Riding of the County of York; with the reserved lands in the rear of the townships of Blenheim and Blandford	...Matchedash, Gloucester, or Penetanguishene, together with Prince William Henry's Island, and all the land lying between the Midland District and a line produced due north from a certain fixed boundary (at the distance of about fifty miles north-west from the outlet of Burlington Bay) till it intersects the northern limits of the Province...

=== Reductions and abolition ===
The District was reduced in size in several steps over the coming years.

The 1798 Act had provided that counties of Durham and Northumberland, upon a request by a majority of their townships, could be detached to form the Newcastle District. This occurred in 1802.

In 1816, the following parts of the District were detached to form Halton County in the newly created Gore District:

...the townships of Trafalgar, Nelson, Flamborough ..., Beverly, and blocks number one, two, three and four, on the Grand river, with the reserved lands in the rear of the townships of Blandford and Blenheim...

In 1837, Simcoe District was detached, consisting of Simcoe County.

In 1849, the Home District was dissolved and replaced for municipal purposes by York County, which was reorganized later that year to form the United Counties of York, Ontario and Peel.
