= Durham County, Ontario =

Former County in Ontario, Canada

Durham County
- Dissolved county
- Interactive map of Durham County
- Coordinates: 43°55′N 78°56′W
- Colony: Upper Canada
- District: Newcastle District
- Established: 1792
- Dissolved: 1850 (reorganized into the United Counties of Northumberland and Durham)
- Time zone: UTC-5 (Eastern (EST))
  - Summer (DST): UTC-4 (Eastern (EDT))

Durham County (area 376,397 acres (1,523 km^{2})) is an historic county in Ontario, Canada. It was named for the English County Durham and city of Durham. It was created in 1792 but was later merged Northumberland County to form the United Counties of Northumberland and Durham. In 1974, the two counties were split and reorganized, with the former portions of Durham County reorganized into the Regional Municipality of Durham.

== History ==
Durham County was created in 1792 by a proclamation of Lieutenant Governor Simcoe. The original boundaries were as follows:

That the thirteenth of the said counties be hereafter called by the name of the county of Durham; which county is to be bounded on the east by the westernmost line of the county of Northumberland, on the south by lake Ontario until it meets the westernmost point of Long Beach, thence by a line running north sixteen degrees west until it intersects the southern boundary of a tract of land belonging to the Mississague Indians, thence along the said tract parallel to lake Ontario until it meets the northwesternmost boundary of the county of Northumberland.

In 1798, the Parliament of Upper Canada passed a statute defining the boundaries of the counties. Durham was then defined to include:

That the townships of Hope, Clarke and Darlington, with all the tract of land hereafter to be laid out into townships, which lies to the southward of the small lakes above the Rice Lake, and the communication between them and between the eastern boundary of the township of Hope, and the western boundary of the township of Darlington, produced north, sixteen degrees west, until they intersect either of the said lakes, or the communication between them, shall constitute and form the County of Durham.

In 1834, the townships of Verulam, Fenelon and Eldon were added to Durham County.

=== Mergers and dissolution ===
Durham was united administratively with Northumberland County as the United Counties of Northumberland and Durham from 1850 until Durham County was dissolved on January 1, 1974.

Effective January 1, 1974, about half of Durham County was merged with Ontario County to create the Regional Municipality of Durham. The township of Manvers was transferred to Victoria County, which is now the city of Kawartha Lakes, Cavan was transferred to Peterborough County, where it is now part of Cavan-Monaghan, and Hope was transferred to Northumberland County, where it is now part of the town of Port Hope.

The townships of Darlington and Clarke were amalgamated with the Town of Bowmanville and the Village of Newcastle as the Town of Newcastle, and the township of Cartwright was combined with the Ontario County townships of Scugog and Reach to create a new Township of Scugog. In 1993, Newcastle was renamed Clarington.

== Historic townships ==
The county was originally composed of the townships of Cartwright, Manvers, Cavan, Darlington, Clarke and Hope, and portions of what is now Peterborough County, created in 1838.

- Cartwright – Area 37,600 acres (152 km^{2}). Located in the northwest portion of Durham County, touching Lake Scugog. The Township was opened in 1816. The name is in honour of Richard Cartwright. Mostly settled between 1850 and 1858 by Irish immigrants. Community centres: Blackstock, Purple Hill, Caesarea, Scugog. This Township is now in Scugog Township
- Cavan – Area 62,296 acres. Settled in 1816. Community centres : Millbrook, Cavan and Carmel. This Township is now in Cavan-Monaghan Township in Peterborough County
- Clarke - Area, 68,500 acres (277 km^{2}). Was opened in 1792 and named in honour of General Alured Clarke. Community centres: Newcastle, Newtonville, Crooked Creek, Morgan's Corners, Orono, Kendall, Leskard. This Township is now in Clarington Municipality
- Darlington – Area, 68,907 acres (279 km^{2}). It was opened in 1792 and named after the ancient English town. The first European settlers arrived from the United States in 1794. Community centres, Bowmanville, Enniskillen, Tyrone, Courtice. (the settlement was mostly Irish). This Township is now in Clarington Municipality.
- Hope – Area, 62,959 acres (255 km^{2}). First settlement was in the town of Port Hope. The Township as opened in 1792 and named in honour Colonel Henry Hope, a member of the Legislative Council of Canada. The Township is now the Town of Port Hope in Northumberland County
- Manvers – Area 69,923 acres (283 km^{2}). Opened in 1816. Named in honour of Charles Pierrepont, 1st Earl Manvers. Community centres: Pontypool, Manvers Station, Janetville, Yelverton, Bethany, Franklin, Brunswick, Burton, Ballyduff, Lotus, Fleetwood, Lifford. Now in the City of Kawartha Lakes.

== See also ==
- List of Ontario census divisions
- List of townships in Ontario
