= York County, Ontario =

Historic county in Canada

Coordinates: 43.857°N 79.423°W

York County
- Dissolved county (Restructured as regional municipality)
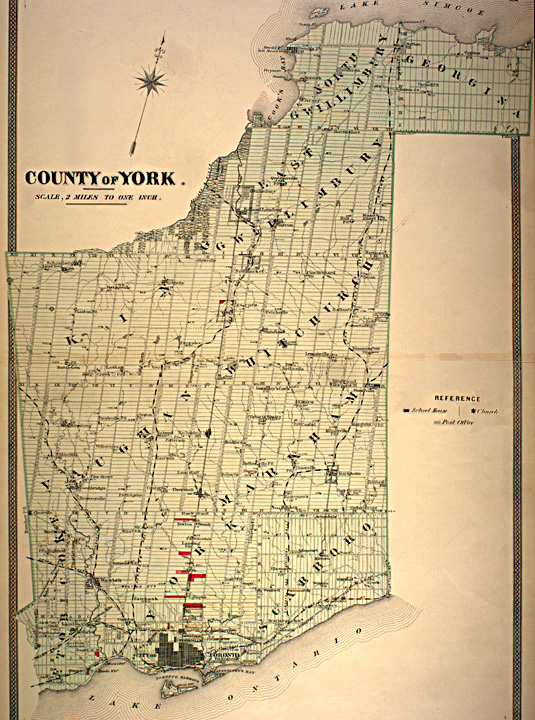
- York County c. 1880s
- Colony/Province: Upper Canada (1792–1841); Province of Canada (1841–1867); Ontario (1867–1971)
- Incorporated: 1792 (created from Home District)
- Dissolved: 1971 (reorganized into the Regional Municipality of York)
- County seat Administrative seat: York (1792–1834); Toronto (1834–1953); Newmarket (1953–1971)

Area
  - Total: 2,392.17 km^{2} (923.62 sq mi)
- The following figure was the size of the county from 1851 to 1953
- Time zone: UTC−05:00 (Eastern)

York County is a historic county in Upper Canada, Canada West, and the Canadian province of Ontario. It was organized by the Upper Canada administration from the lands of the Toronto Purchase and others.

Created in 1792, at its largest size, it encompassed the area that presently comprises the City of Toronto, the regional municipalities of Halton, Peel, and York as well as portions of Regional Municipality of Durham and the City of Hamilton. However, by 1851, York County only consisted of the areas presently comprising Toronto and Regional Municipality of York. In 1953, York County was split again, with the area south of Steeles Avenue forming the Municipality of Metropolitan Toronto.

York County was formally dissolved in 1971, with its remaining municipalities reorganized as the Regional Municipality of York.

== History ==
York County was created on 16 June 1792 and was part of the jurisdiction of the Home District of Upper Canada. It originally comprised all of what is now the City of Toronto, the regional municipalities of Halton, Peel, and York as well as portions of the Regional Municipality of Durham, and the City of Hamilton. The town of York, later incorporated as the City of Toronto in 1834, served as the initial seat for the county. Once Toronto was incorporated, it was severed from York County, although county offices remained located in Toronto.

In 1816, Wentworth and Halton counties were created, with portions of York County transferred to the new counties. In 1851, the western portions of York County were separated to form Peel County. In the same year, the eastern riding of York County was separated from York to form Ontario County.

In April 1953, the Metropolitan Toronto Act was passed in the Legislative Assembly of Ontario. This resulted in municipalities south of Steeles Avenue being severed from York County to form the Municipality of Metropolitan Toronto, and the county offices for York County were moved from Toronto to Newmarket. The Act went into effect on 1 January 1954.

At a meeting in Richmond Hill on 6 May 1970, officials representing the municipalities of York County approved plans for the creation of a regional government entity to replace York County. In 1971, the remaining portion of York County was dissolved by restructuring it into the new Regional Municipality of York.

=== Historic municipalities ===
The following table is a list of historic municipalities that were at one point situated within York County.

Type of municipality (Note: The type of municipality displayed is from the year the municipality was severed from York County, not its present type)	Name of municipality	Year severed from York County	Present municipality	Present upper-tier government
Township	Albion	1851	Town of Caledon	Peel Region
Town	Aurora	1971 (Note: In 1971, York County was dissolved, and reorganized into the Regional Municipality of York.)	Town of Aurora	York Region
Township	Caledon	1851	Town of Caledon	Peel Region
Township	Chinguacousy	1851	City of Brampton; Town of Caledon	Peel Region
Township	East Gwillimbury	1971	Town of East Gwillimbury	York Region
Township	East York	1954	City of Toronto (Note: East York Township was merged into Metropolitan Toronto in 1954, becoming the Borough of York. It was severed from York Country in the process.)	
Township	Etobicoke	1954	City of Toronto (Note: The township of Etobicoke became the Borough of Etobicoke when it became part of Metropolitan Toronto in 1954, thereby being severed from York County.)	
Village	Forest Hill	1954	City of Toronto (Note: The village of Forest Hill became the Borough of Forest Hill when it became part of Metropolitan Toronto in 1954, thereby being severed from York County. The borough itself was dissolved in 1967.)	
Township	Georgina	1971	Town of Georgina	York Region
Township	King	1971	Township of King	York Region
Town	Leaside	1954	City of Toronto (Note: The town of Leaside became part of Metro Toronto in 1954, thereby being severed from York County.)	
Village	Long Branch	1954	City of Toronto (Note: Long Branch was originally part of Etobicoke Township. It was merged into Metro Toronto in 1954, thereby being severed from York County.)	
Village	Markham	1971	City of Markham	York Region
Town	Mimico	1954	City of Toronto (Note: Mimico was originally part of Etobicoke Township, later becoming a town on its own within York County. When Metro Toronto was formed in 1954, it was merged into Metro, thereby being severed by York County. The town itself was dissolved in 1967.)	
Town	New Toronto	1954	City of Toronto (Note: New Toronto was originally part of Etobicoke Township, later becoming a town on its own within York County. When Metro Toronto was formed in 1954, it was merged into Metro, thereby being severed by York County. The town itself was dissolved in 1967.)	
Township	Nelson	1816	City of Burlington	Halton Region
Town	Newmarket	1971	Town of Newmarket	York Region
Township	North Gwillimbury	1971	Town of Georgina	York Region
Township	North York	1954	City of Toronto (Note: North York was originally part of York Township, later becoming a township on its own within York County. When Metro Toronto was formed in 1954, it was merged into Metro, becoming the Borough of North York, thereby being severed by York County. It later became the City of North York, within Metro.)	
Village	Oshawa	1851	City of Oshawa	Durham Region
Township	Pickering	1851	City of Pickering	Durham Region
City	Richmond Hill	1971	City of Richmond Hill	York Region
Township	Scarborough	1954	City of Toronto (Note: The township was merged into Metro Toronto as the Borough of Scarborough in 1954, thereby being severed from York County.)	
Village	Stouffville	1971	Town of Whitchurch-Stouffville	York Region
Village	Swansea	1954	City of Toronto (Note: The village of Swansea became part of Metro Toronto in 1954, thereby being severed from York County. The village itself was absorbed into Old Toronto in 1967.)	
Township	Thorah	1851	Township of Brock	Durham Region
Township	Toronto	1851	City of Mississauga; City of Brampton	Peel Region
Township	Toronto Gore	1851	City of Brampton; City of Mississauga	Peel Region
Township	Trafalgar	1816	Town of Oakville	Halton Region
Township	Uxbridge	1851	Township of Uxbridge	Durham Region
Township	Vaughan	1971	City of Vaughan	York Region
Town	Weston	1954	City of Toronto (Note: Weston was merged into Metro Toronto in 1954, thereby being severed from York County.)	
Township	Whitby	1851	Town of Whitby	Durham Region
Township	Whitchurch	1971	Town of Whitchurch-Stouffville	York Region
Township	York	1954	City of Toronto (Note: When the City of Toronto (Old Toronto) was incorporated in 1834, the portion of the township encompassing the City was severed. York Township continued in that part of the county north of the new City. It became the Borough of York, part of Metro Toronto in 1954, thereby being severed from York County.)	

== Governance ==
The seat of government for York County was situated in Toronto (named York prior to 1834) from 1792 to 1953. After the creation of Metropolitan Toronto in 1953, the seat of government for York County was moved to Newmarket.

=== County offices ===
From the 19th century to 1900, the offices of York County were held in various court houses. York County offices were first held at the First York County Courthouse on Front Street and Parliament Street from 1800 to 1813. The First York County Courthouse also housed the Legislative Assembly of Upper Canada.)After the Battle of York, the county officials and legislative assembly met at the home of Major Alexander Montgomery Jr., located on north side of Richmond Street between Yonge and Victoria Streets (now Confederation Life Building). From 1824 to 1845, the county's offices were located at the Second York County Courthouse on Church Street and King Street. From 1852 to 1900, the county offices were located at the Adelaide Court House.

From 1900 to 1953, the municipal government of Toronto shared its office space with York County at Toronto's Old City Hall.

After the southern portion of York County was severed to form Metropolitan Toronto in 1953, the county's offices were relocated to the Old Newmarket Town Hall and Courthouse. In 1957, the York County Administrative Offices was also opened at 62 Bayview Parkway.

=== Representation in colonial legislatures ===
==== Upper Canada ====
York County was represented in the Legislative Assembly of Upper Canada by several ridings, initially grouped with neighbouring counties, then for the town of York (York, Upper Canada) and rural parts or York County:

Year	Riding(s)	Notes
1792	Durham, York & 1st Lincoln	single riding representing Durham County, York County and Lincoln County
1800	Durham, Simcoe & 1st York and West York, 1st Lincoln & Haldimand	2 ridings created with Haldimand County joining Lincoln County and western part of York County
1809	West York, 1st Lincoln & Haldimand, East York & Simcoe	West York and 1st Lincoln & Haldimand become separate ridings, Durham County breaks from York and Simcoe to form Durham and Northumberland; 1st York renamed as East York
1817	East York & Simcoe	West York riding disappears
1821	York & Simcoe, York, York (town)	East York & Simcoe becomes York & Simcoe, two new ridings - covering York County outside of Town of York and another covering on the Town of York only
1829	York, York (town)	York & Simcoe separated with York County outside of Town of York represented by single riding
1835	Toronto, 1st York, 2nd York, 3rd York and 4th York	after City of Toronto created in 1834 the riding is renamed Toronto, the rural York riding is broken into 4 separate ridings

==== Province of Canada ====
York was represented in the Legislative Assembly of the Province of Canada from 1841 to 1867 with rural and town (city after 1834) ridings:

Year	Riding(s)	Notes
1841	Toronto, 1st York, 2nd York, 3rd York, 4th York	Ridings carried over from former Parliament of Upper Canada
1848	Toronto, York East, York West, York North, York South	Rural York County ridings renamed by dropping numbering
1857	Toronto, York East, York West, York North	York South dissolved
1860	East Toronto, West Toronto, York East, York West, York North	Toronto ridings renamed

Most members were residents in Toronto and did not necessary represent a specific geographical area of York County.

== See also ==
- Greater Toronto Area
- List of Ontario census divisions
