= Ontario County =

Ontario County may refer to:

- Ontario County, New York, United States
- Ontario County, Ontario, a former county in Canada
- Bradford County, Pennsylvania, United States, known as Ontario County until 1812
