= Mississaugas of Scugog Island First Nation =

Mississaugas of Scugog Island
- Indian reserve
- Mississaugas of Scugog Island Indian Reserve
- Location within Southern Ontario
- Coordinates: 44°11′N 78°53′W
- Country: Canada
- Province: Ontario
- Regional municipality: Durham
- First Nation: Mississaugas of Scugog Island

Area
  - Land: 2.57 km^{2} (0.99 sq mi)

Population (2021)
  - Total: 125
  - Density: 48.6/km^{2} (126/sq mi)
- Website: www.scugogfirstnation.com

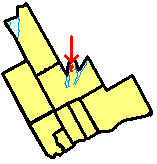

Mississaugas of Scugog Island is a First Nation and reserve for the Mississaugas of Scugog Island band government in south-central Ontario, Canada. It is located near Lake Scugog in Durham Region.

== Governance ==
Scugog Island's leadership consists of a chief and two councillors, elected under the Indian Act Electoral System. The First Nation is a member of Ogemawahj Tribal Council, a regional Chiefs' council.

Governance history
Selection Date	Chief	Councillors
June 2025	Kelly LaRocca	Jeff Forbes, Sylvia Coleman, Laura Colwell, Jake Kozlinsky
October 2023	Kelly LaRocca	Jeff Forbes, Sylvia Coleman
June 2023	Kelly LaRocca	Tracy L. Gauthier, Sylvia Coleman
June 2021	Kelly LaRocca	Laura Colwell, Jeff Forbes
June 2019	Kelly LaRocca	Jamie Coons, Laura Colwell
June 2017	Kelly LaRocca	Jamie Coons, Laura Colwell
June 2015	Kelly LaRocca	Della Charles, Tracy L. Gauthier
June 2013	Kelly LaRocca	Della Charles, Tracy L. Gauthier
June 2011	Tracy L. Gauthier	Della Charles, Kelly LaRocca
June 2009	Tracy L. Gauthier	Della Charles, Kelly LaRocca
June 2007	Tracy L. Gauthier	Angela Johnson, Della Charles
June 2005	Tracy L. Gauthier	Angela Johnson, Della Charles
June 2003	Tracy L. Gauthier	Angela Johnson, Valerie LaRocca
June 2001	Tracy L. Gauthier	Angela Johnson, Valerie LaRocca
June 1999	Rennie B. Goose	Shawn W. Eade, Tracy L. Gauthier
June 1997	Rennie B. Goose	Shawn W. Eade, Tracy L. Gauthier
June 1995	Gary Edgar	Shawn W. Eade, Rennie B. Goose
June 1993	Gary Edgar	Richard R. Edgar, Arthur G. Goose
May 1991	Yvonne Edgar	Arthur G. Goose, Richard R. Edgar
June 1989	Yvonne Edgar	Arthur G. Goose, Richard R. Edgar
June 1987	Yvonne Edgar	Ernest Edgar, Richard R. Edgar By-election: Arthur G. Goose
May 1985	Yvonne Edgar	Arthur G. Goose, Richard R. Edgar
June 1983	Yvonne Edgar	Gary Edgar, Richard R. Edgar
June 1981	Arnold Goose	Ronald Edgar, Arthur G. Goose
June 1979	Arnold Goose	Ronald Edgar, Ernie Edgar
June 1977	Arnold Goose	Ronald Edgar, Ernie Edgar
June 1975	Arnold Goose	John Edgar, Willena Goose
June 1973	Arnold Goose	John Edgar, Willena Goose
June 1971	Arnold Goose	John Edgar, Jackie Edgar
May 1969	George G. Edgar	Arnold Goose, John Edgar
May 1967	Ronald Edgar	Delbert Charles, Arnold Goose By-election: John Edgar
May 1965	John Edgar	Burton Johnson, Ronald Edgar
June 1963	John Edgar	Ronald Edgar, Burton Johnson
May 1961	Ronald Edgar	Burton Johnson, John Edgar
May 1959	Ronald Edgar	Burton Johnson, John Edgar
May 1957	Edwin Edgar	Arnold Goose, Ronald Edgar
May 1955	Edwin Edgar	Arnold Goose, Burton Johnson
April 1953	Edwin Edgar	George Edgar, Burton Johnson
January 1950	Edwin Edgar	
January 1947	Edwin Edgar	
January 1944	Edwin Edgar	
January 1941	Arnold Goose	
December 1937	Charles F. Marsden	
June 1934	Charles F. Marsden	
May 1931	Charles F. Marsden	
January 1926	Thomas Marsden	
January 1923	Thomas Marsden	
January 1920	David Elliot	
May 1909	Isaac Johnson	
June 1904	Isaac Johnson	
February 1901	Isaac Johnson	
September 1897	George Goose	
November 1893	Isaac Johnson	
1865	John Johnson	

== Demographics ==
According to the Canada 2001 Census:

- Population: 51
- % Change (1996-2001): N/A
- Dwellings: 28
- Area (km^{2}): 2.58
- Density (persons per km^{2}): 19.7

Historical populations
Year	Pop.	±%
2001	51	—
2006	72	+41.2%
2011	93	+29.2%
2016	131	+40.9%
2021	125	−4.6%

Indigenous Population
Canada 2021 Census		Population	% of Total Population
Indigenous group Source:	First Nations	100	80
Indigenous group Source:	Métis	0	0
Indigenous group Source:	Inuit	0	0
Total Indigenous population		100	80
Non-Indigenous		25	20
Total population		125	100
