= Newcastle District =

Coordinates: 44°00′N 78°15′W

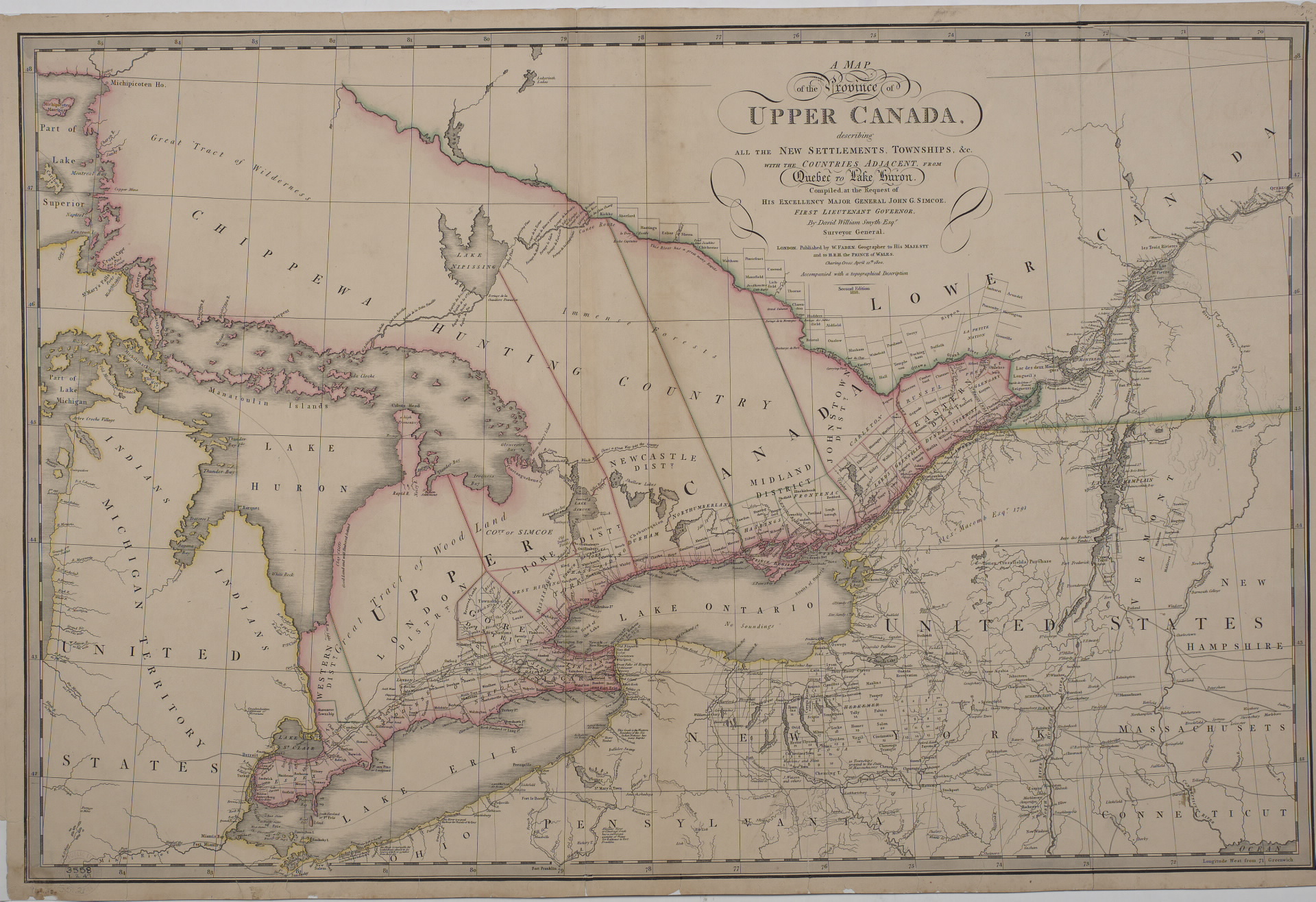
1818 map of Ontario showing Newcastle District

The Newcastle District was a historic district in Upper Canada which existed until 1849. It was formed in 1802 from the Home District, consisting of the counties of Durham and Northumberland.

== History ==
The legislature had enacted in 1798 that "as soon as there are one thousand souls within the said counties, and that six of the townships therein do hold town meetings according to law," the government shall constitute them as a separate district; which was done in 1802.

Organization of the Newcastle District (1802)
Northumberland County	Durham County
The townships of: Murray; Cramahé; Haldimand; Hamilton; Elmwick; Percy; Seymour; together with the peninsula of Newcastle	The townships of: Hope; Clarke; Darlington; with all the tract of land ... which lies to the southward of the small lakes above the Rice Lake, and the communication between them and the communication between the eastern boundary of the township of Hope, and the western boundary of the township of Darlington, produced north fifteen degrees west, until they intersect either of the said lakes, or the communication between them...

The district town was originally Newcastle, located near the current town of Brighton, and then Amherst, later renamed Cobourg.

In 1841, the northern part of the District was detached to form the Colborne District, consisting of Peterborough County. It consisted of the following territory:

Organization of the Colborne District (1841)
Peterborough County

The townships of

- Belmont
- Methurn
- Burleigh
- Dummer
- Asphodel
- Otonabee
- Douro
- Smith
- Ennismore
- Harvey
- Verulam
- Emily
- Ops
- Fenelon
- Mariposa
- Eldon
- Bexley
- Somerville

and

- the seven rear concessions of Monaghan
- the unsurveyed lands in rear thereof, and the Islands lying wholly or in greater part opposite thereto...

In 1850, the district was dissolved, and replaced with the United Counties of Northumberland and Durham that was established for municipal purposes.
