= United Counties of Northumberland and Durham, Ontario =

United Counties of Northumberland and Durham
- Dissolved county
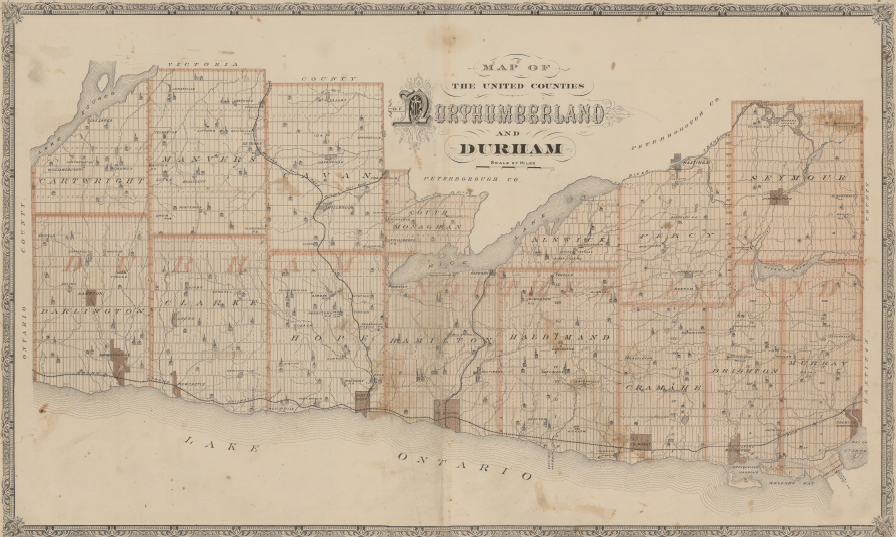
- Excerpt map from the 1878 publication titled The Illustrated historical atlas of the counties of Northumberland and Durham, Ontario, Canada
- Country: Canada
- Province: Ontario
- Established: 1850 (merger of Durham and Northumberland County)
- Dissolved: January 1, 1974: legislated split into Northumberland County and the Regional Municipality of Durham)

The United Counties of Northumberland and Durham was a historic county in the Canadian province of Ontario. The two counties were originally combined into the District of Newcastle, formed in 1802, and continued as united counties from 1850 until January 1, 1974.

In 1974, portions of Durham County were amalgamated with the adjacent Ontario County to form the Regional Municipality of Durham. Manvers Township went to Victoria County, and what is now the township of Cavan Monaghan became part of Peterborough County. What is now the municipality of Port Hope continued as part of Northumberland County.
