= Regional Municipality of Durham =

Durham Region
- Regional municipality (upper-tier)
- Regional Municipality of Durham
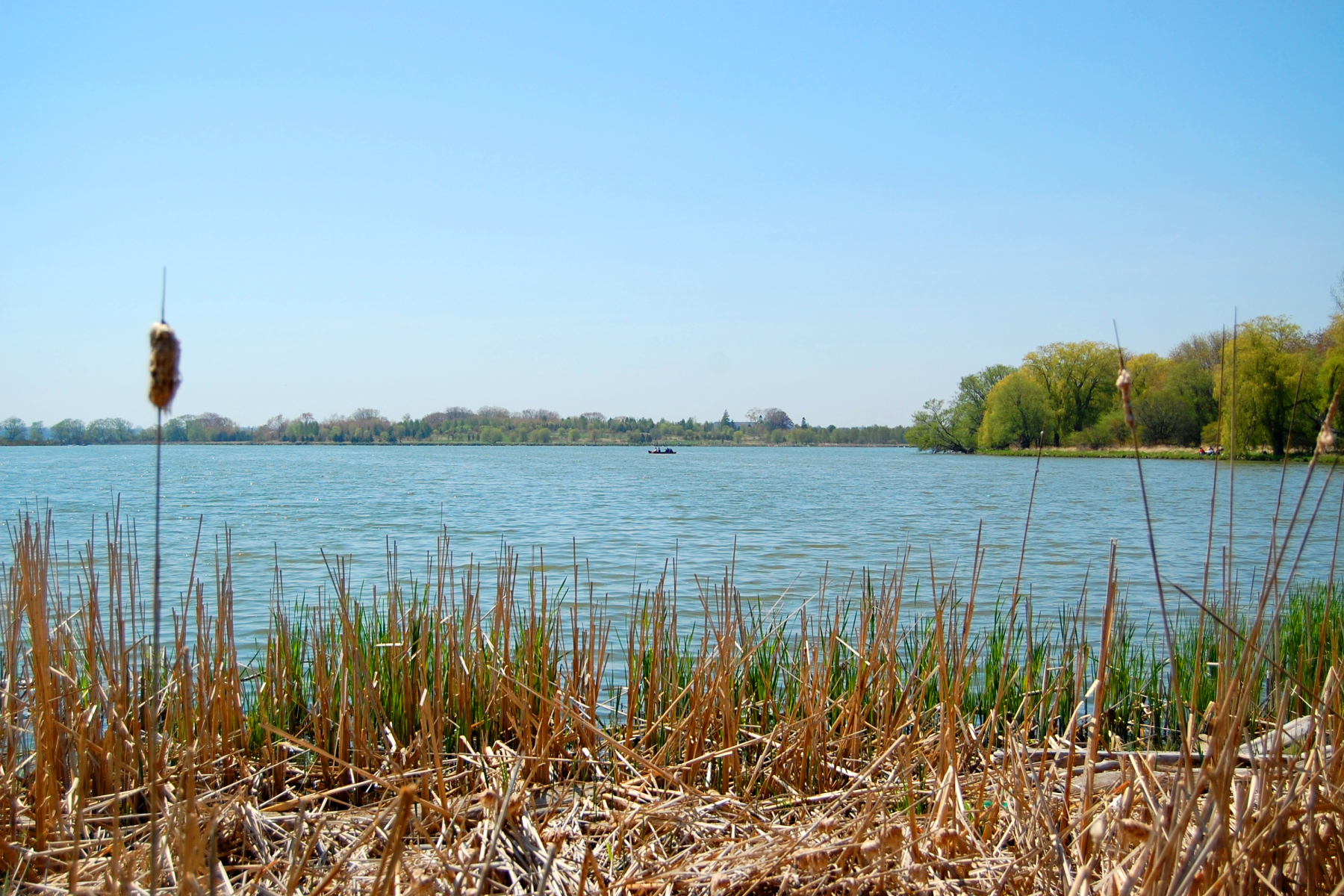
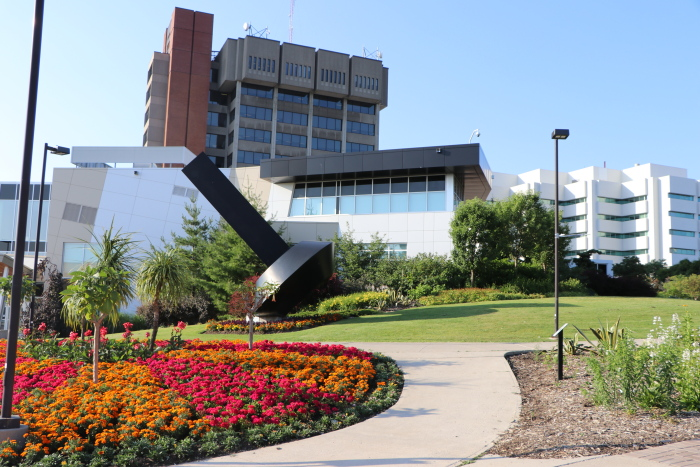
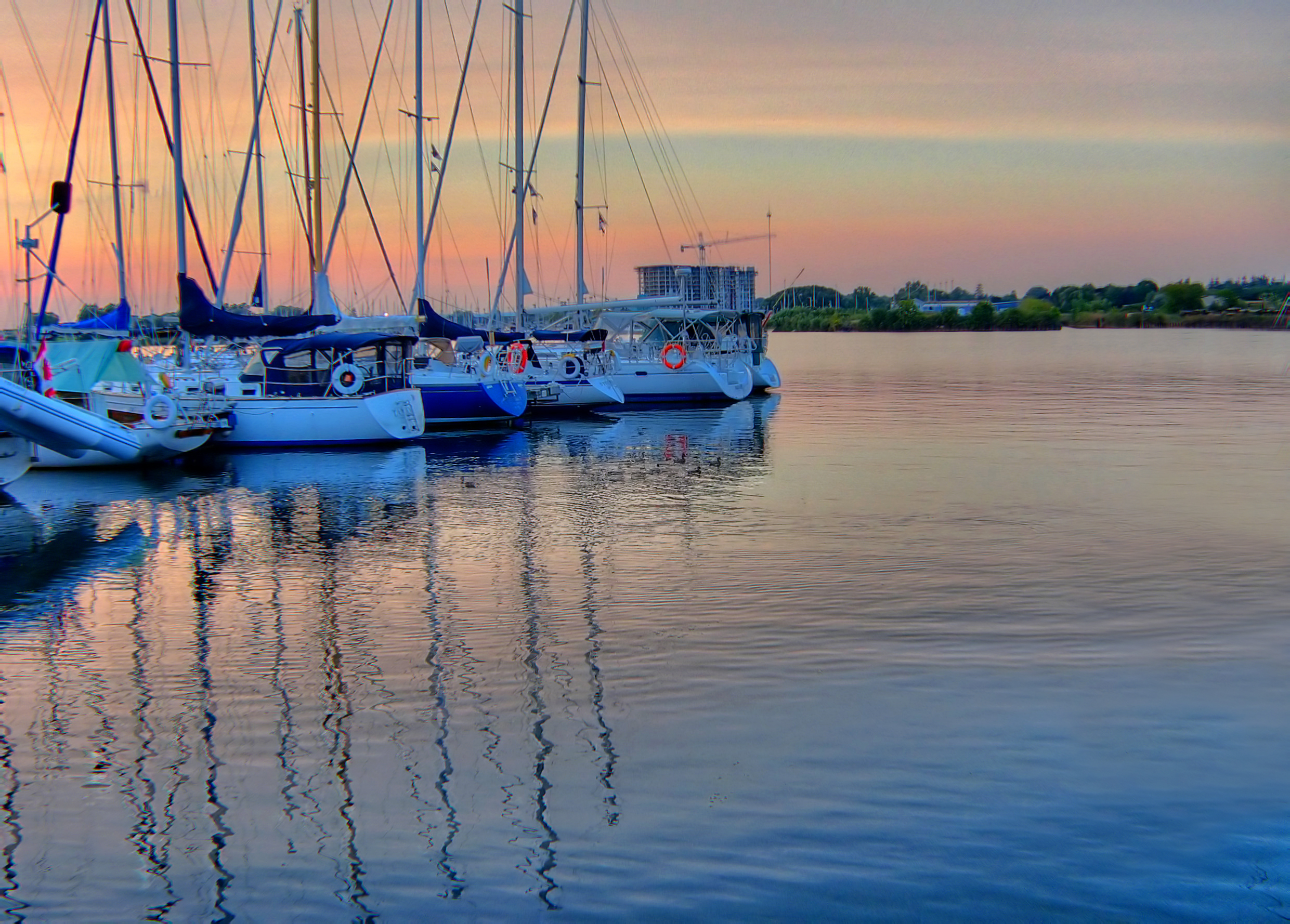
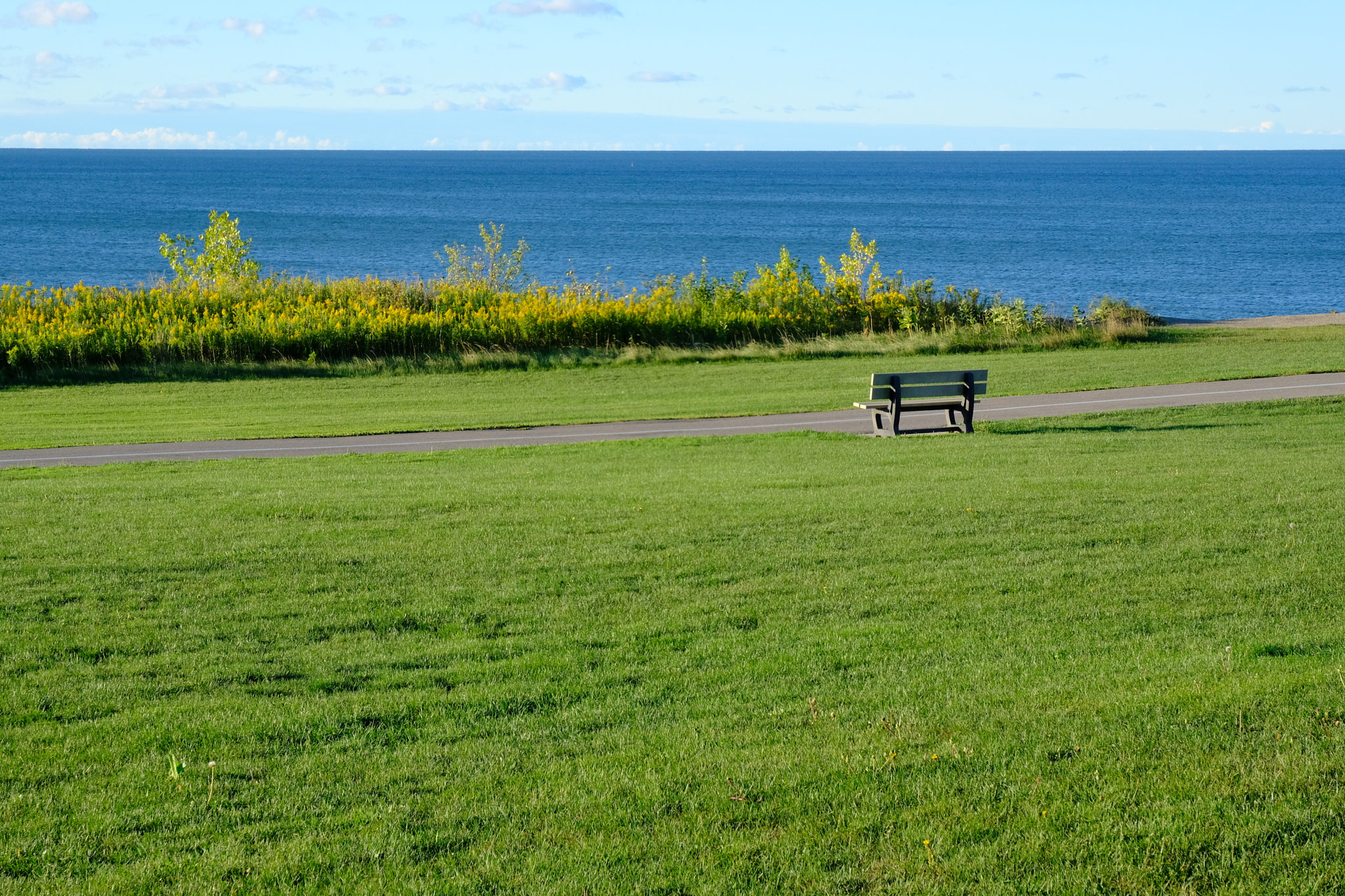
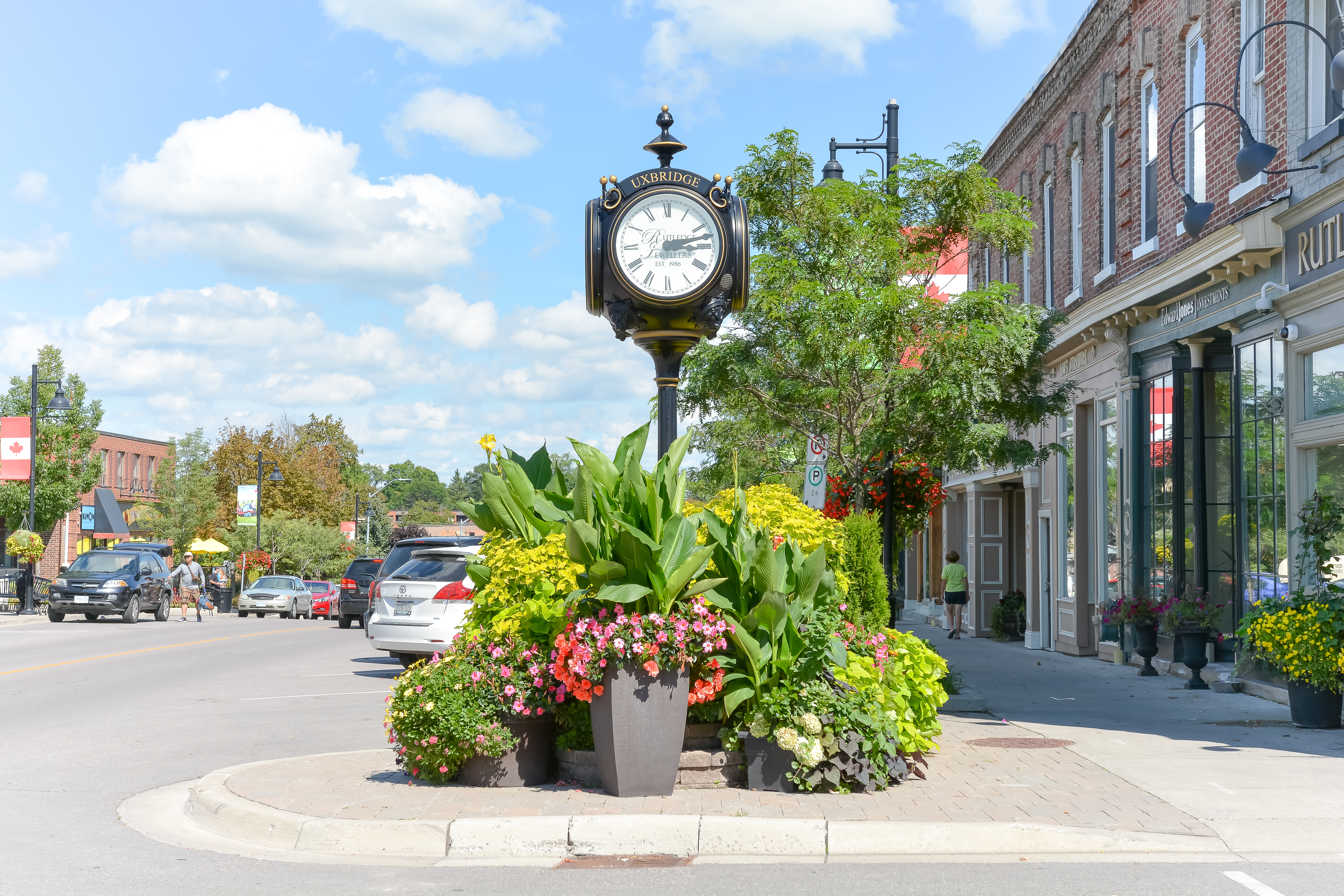
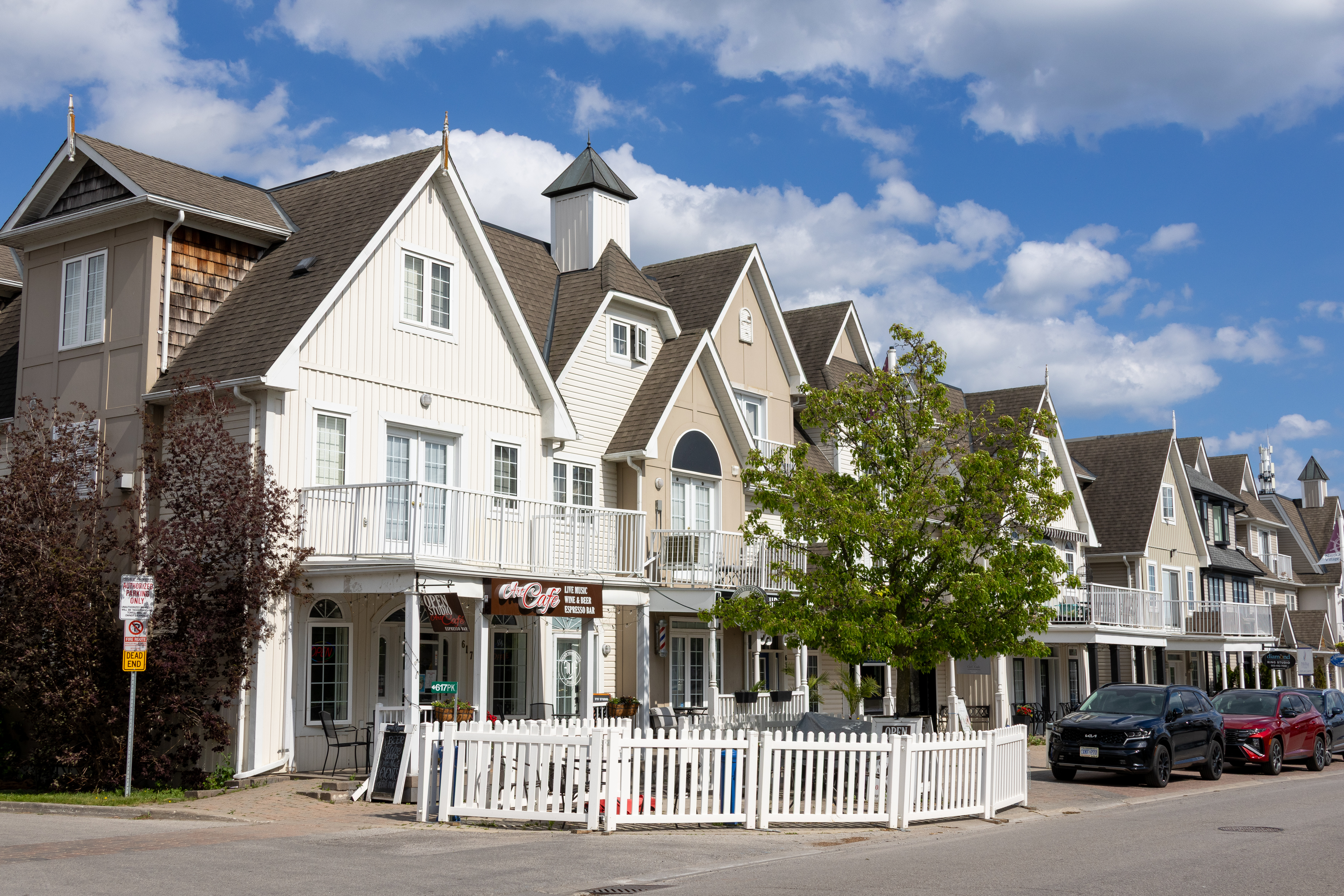
- Clockwise from top right: Oshawa, Ajax Waterfront Park, Nautical Village in Pickering, Uxbridge, Whitby Harbour, Darlington Provincial Park

- Flag Seal
- Motto: "A Great Place to Grow"

- Map showing Durham Region's location in Ontario
- Coordinates: 43°55′N 78°56′W
- Country: Canada
- Province: Ontario
- Established: 1974 (Note: Ontario County, and portions of the United Counties of Northumberland and Durham were amalgamated in 1974 to form the regional municipality. The Durham portion of the United Counties of Northumberland and Durham was initially established as Durham County in 1792, before it was amalgamated with Northumberland County in 1850 to form the United Counties. Ontario County was formed from York County in 1852. The two counties operated until 1974 when they were dissolved, and Ontario County and the Durham portion of the United Counties were amalgamated to form the regional municipality.)
- Seat: Whitby

Government
  - Chair Governing body: John Henry; Durham Regional Council

Area
  - Land: 2,521.11 km^{2} (973.41 sq mi)
- Elevation: 91.3 m (300 ft)

Population (2021)
  - Total: 696,692
  - Density: 276.5/km^{2} (716/sq mi)
- Time zone: UTC−05:00 (EST)
  - Summer (DST): UTC−04:00 (EDT)
- Postal code prefix: L
- Website: www.durham.ca/en/index.aspx

The Regional Municipality of Durham (/ˈdʊərəm/), informally referred to as Durham Region, is a regional municipality in Southern Ontario, Canada. Located east of Toronto and the Regional Municipality of York, it forms the east end of the Greater Toronto Area (GTA) and is part of the Golden Horseshoe region. It has an area of approximately 2,500 km^{2} (970 sq mi). The regional government is headquartered in Whitby.

The southern portion of Durham Region, on Lake Ontario, is primarily suburban in nature, forming the eastern end of the "905 belt" of suburbs around Toronto, while the northern portion comprises rural areas and small towns. The city of Pickering, town of Ajax, and the township of Uxbridge are part of the Toronto Census Metropolitan Area, while the communities of Oshawa, Whitby, and Clarington comprise the Oshawa Census Metropolitan Area.

== Administrative divisions ==
Durham Region consists of eight municipalities:

Municipality	Former county	2021 Population
City of Oshawa	Ontario	175,383
Town of Whitby	Ontario	138,501
Town of Ajax	Ontario	126,666
Municipality of Clarington	Durham	101,427
City of Pickering	Ontario	99,186
Township of Scugog	Durham, Ontario	21,581
Township of Uxbridge	Ontario	21,556
Township of Brock	Ontario	12,567

It also contains one First Nations reserve: Mississaugas of Scugog Island First Nation.

== History ==
The Region of Durham was established in 1974 as one of several new regional governments in the Province of Ontario, primarily in fast-growing urban and suburban areas. It encompasses areas that had been part of Ontario County and the United Counties of Northumberland and Durham, and was the culmination of a series of studies into municipal governance in the "Oshawa-Centred Region" that had begun in the late 1960s.

The boundaries of the region were different from what had been anticipated and announced in late 1972. For example, it was widely expected that Pickering would be annexed to Metropolitan Toronto, which residents had supported in a ballot question. In addition, the region was proposed to extend further east to include Hope Township and the town of Port Hope, and did not include the northern townships of Scott, Brock and Thorah.

== Climate ==
Under the Köppen climate classification, the Durham Region has a humid continental climate (Köppen Dfb). On average July is the hottest month while January is the coldest month.

Climate data for Bowmanville Mostert (Clarington) Climate ID: 6150830; coordinates 43°55′N 78°40′W; elevation 99.1 m (325 ft), 1981–2010 normals, extremes 1966–2002
Month	Jan	Feb	Mar	Apr	May	Jun	Jul	Aug	Sep	Oct	Nov	Dec	Year
Record high °C (°F)	13.0 (55.4)	12.5 (54.5)	21.5 (70.7)	29.0 (84.2)	33.0 (91.4)	33.5 (92.3)	36.0 (96.8)	35.0 (95.0)	32.2 (90.0)	26.0 (78.8)	21.1 (70.0)	17.5 (63.5)	36.0 (96.8)
Mean daily maximum °C (°F)	−1.4 (29.5)	0.0 (32.0)	4.3 (39.7)	11.3 (52.3)	18.0 (64.4)	23.1 (73.6)	25.8 (78.4)	24.8 (76.6)	20.4 (68.7)	13.7 (56.7)	7.2 (45.0)	1.6 (34.9)	12.4 (54.3)
Daily mean °C (°F)	−5.6 (21.9)	−4.4 (24.1)	−0.2 (31.6)	6.4 (43.5)	12.4 (54.3)	17.5 (63.5)	20.0 (68.0)	19.2 (66.6)	15.0 (59.0)	8.7 (47.7)	3.4 (38.1)	−2.2 (28.0)	7.5 (45.5)
Mean daily minimum °C (°F)	−9.9 (14.2)	−8.8 (16.2)	−4.6 (23.7)	1.5 (34.7)	6.8 (44.2)	11.8 (53.2)	14.3 (57.7)	13.5 (56.3)	9.5 (49.1)	3.6 (38.5)	−0.4 (31.3)	−6.0 (21.2)	2.6 (36.7)
Record low °C (°F)	−34.0 (−29.2)	−30.0 (−22.0)	−26.0 (−14.8)	−14.4 (6.1)	−5.0 (23.0)	−1.0 (30.2)	2.8 (37.0)	−0.5 (31.1)	−3.3 (26.1)	−8.3 (17.1)	−17.8 (0.0)	−34.5 (−30.1)	−34.5 (−30.1)
Average precipitation mm (inches)	63.1 (2.48)	50.5 (1.99)	55.0 (2.17)	70.6 (2.78)	75.9 (2.99)	83.8 (3.30)	63.2 (2.49)	78.1 (3.07)	98.7 (3.89)	70.8 (2.79)	88.6 (3.49)	68.1 (2.68)	866.5 (34.11)
Average rainfall mm (inches)	32.2 (1.27)	32.8 (1.29)	41.0 (1.61)	68.0 (2.68)	75.9 (2.99)	83.8 (3.30)	63.2 (2.49)	78.1 (3.07)	98.7 (3.89)	70.6 (2.78)	83.1 (3.27)	46.1 (1.81)	773.3 (30.44)
Average snowfall cm (inches)	31.0 (12.2)	17.7 (7.0)	14.1 (5.6)	2.6 (1.0)	0.0 (0.0)	0.0 (0.0)	0.0 (0.0)	0.0 (0.0)	0.0 (0.0)	0.1 (0.0)	5.6 (2.2)	22.0 (8.7)	93.1 (36.7)
Average precipitation days (≥ 0.2 mm)	12.5	10.8	11.2	12.5	12.2	12.0	10.4	11.5	13.0	13.0	14.3	13.0	146.4
Average rainy days (≥ 0.2 mm)	5.5	5.3	8.0	11.8	12.2	12.0	10.4	11.5	13.0	13.0	12.7	7.4	122.7
Average snowy days (≥ 0.2 cm)	7.8	6.3	4.0	1.1	0.0	0.0	0.0	0.0	0.0	0.1	2.1	6.5	27.9
Source: Environment Canada

Climate data for Oshawa WCPC Climate ID: 6155878; coordinates 43°52′N 78°50′W, elevation: 83.8 m (275 ft); 1991−2020 normals, extremes 1882–present
Month	Jan	Feb	Mar	Apr	May	Jun	Jul	Aug	Sep	Oct	Nov	Dec	Year
Record high °C (°F)	14.0 (57.2)	18.3 (64.9)	23.5 (74.3)	29.5 (85.1)	32.0 (89.6)	34.5 (94.1)	39.4 (102.9)	36.0 (96.8)	34.4 (93.9)	28.2 (82.8)	23.0 (73.4)	16.5 (61.7)	39.4 (102.9)
Mean daily maximum °C (°F)	−1.1 (30.0)	−0.2 (31.6)	4.5 (40.1)	10.6 (51.1)	17.5 (63.5)	22.7 (72.9)	25.7 (78.3)	24.8 (76.6)	20.9 (69.6)	13.6 (56.5)	7.5 (45.5)	2.2 (36.0)	12.4 (54.3)
Daily mean °C (°F)	−5 (23)	−4.2 (24.4)	0.3 (32.5)	6.2 (43.2)	12.6 (54.7)	17.8 (64.0)	20.9 (69.6)	20.1 (68.2)	16.2 (61.2)	9.5 (49.1)	3.9 (39.0)	−1.2 (29.8)	8.1 (46.6)
Mean daily minimum °C (°F)	−8.9 (16.0)	−8.3 (17.1)	−3.9 (25.0)	1.7 (35.1)	7.6 (45.7)	12.9 (55.2)	15.8 (60.4)	15.4 (59.7)	11.4 (52.5)	5.3 (41.5)	0.3 (32.5)	−4.6 (23.7)	3.7 (38.7)
Record low °C (°F)	−32.8 (−27.0)	−34.4 (−29.9)	−28.3 (−18.9)	−17.2 (1.0)	−6.1 (21.0)	0.0 (32.0)	2.8 (37.0)	0.0 (32.0)	−5 (23)	−12.8 (9.0)	−19.4 (−2.9)	−32.2 (−26.0)	−34.4 (−29.9)
Average precipitation mm (inches)	74.7 (2.94)	53.5 (2.11)	53.9 (2.12)	86.9 (3.42)	85.1 (3.35)	94.0 (3.70)	85.8 (3.38)	74.2 (2.92)	86.2 (3.39)	71.8 (2.83)	72.5 (2.85)	67.8 (2.67)	906.3 (35.68)
Average rainfall mm (inches)	41.2 (1.62)	27.7 (1.09)	42.9 (1.69)	85.3 (3.36)	85.1 (3.35)	94.0 (3.70)	85.8 (3.38)	74.2 (2.92)	86.2 (3.39)	71.7 (2.82)	67.4 (2.65)	43.1 (1.70)	804.6 (31.68)
Average snowfall cm (inches)	33.5 (13.2)	25.8 (10.2)	10.9 (4.3)	1.6 (0.6)	0.0 (0.0)	0.0 (0.0)	0.0 (0.0)	0.0 (0.0)	0.0 (0.0)	0.1 (0.0)	5.1 (2.0)	24.7 (9.7)	101.7 (40.0)
Average precipitation days (≥ 0.2 mm)	13.8	10.2	10.6	12.4	12.2	11.8	10.8	10.3	11.0	13.5	13.6	12.9	143.1
Average rainy days (≥ 0.2 mm)	6.0	4.3	7.9	12.1	12.2	11.8	10.8	10.3	11.0	13.5	12.4	7.8	120.1
Average snowy days (≥ 0.2 cm)	8.5	6.8	3.3	0.74	0.0	0.0	0.0	0.0	0.0	0.09	1.6	5.8	26.8
Source: Environment and Climate Change Canada

== Demographics ==
As a census division in the 2021 Census of Population conducted by Statistics Canada, the Regional Municipality of Durham had a population of 696,992 living in 243,048 of its 250,559 total private dwellings, a change of 7.9% from its 2016 population of 645,862. With a land area of 2,521.11 km^{2} (973.41 sq mi), it had a population density of 276.5/km^{2} (716.0/sq mi) in 2021.

Historical census populations

Year	Pop.	±%
1991	409,070	—
1996	458,616	+12.1%
2001	506,901	+10.5%
2006	561,258	+10.7%

Year	Pop.	±%
2011	608,124	+8.4%
2016	645,862	+6.2%
2021	696,992	+7.9%

Source: Statistics Canada

Panethnic groups in the Regional Municipality of Durham (2001−2021)
Panethnic group	2021		2016		2011		2006		2001	
Panethnic group	Pop.	%	Pop.	%	Pop.	%	Pop.	%	Pop.	%
European (Note: Statistic includes all persons that did not make up part of a visible minority or an indigenous identity.)	426,250	61.65%	453,630	70.94%	468,455	77.87%	457,340	82.06%	436,080	86.71%
South Asian	92,315	13.35%	55,025	8.6%	34,090	5.67%	24,110	4.33%	14,830	2.95%
African	66,035	9.55%	51,380	8.03%	41,890	6.96%	33,300	5.97%	22,545	4.48%
Southeast Asian (Note: Statistic includes total responses of "Filipino" and "Southeast Asian" under visible minority section on census.)	23,365	3.38%	16,925	2.65%	14,250	2.37%	9,060	1.63%	5,220	1.04%
East Asian (Note: Statistic includes total responses of "Chinese", "Korean", and "Japanese" under visible minority section on census.)	19,545	2.83%	14,685	2.3%	11,130	1.85%	10,260	1.84%	7,845	1.56%
Middle Eastern (Note: Statistic includes total responses of "West Asian" and "Arab" under visible minority section on census.)	18,365	2.66%	12,345	1.93%	7,055	1.17%	5,655	1.01%	3,305	0.66%
Indigenous	13,795	2%	12,535	1.96%	8,905	1.48%	6,570	1.18%	4,305	0.86%
Latin American	8,105	1.17%	6,135	0.96%	4,365	0.73%	3,100	0.56%	2,090	0.42%
Other (Note: Statistic includes total responses of "Visible minority, n.i.e." and "Multiple visible minorities" under visible minority section on census.)	23,580	3.41%	16,855	2.64%	11,480	1.91%	7,925	1.42%	6,680	1.33%
Total responses	691,355	99.19%	639,495	99.01%	601,605	98.93%	557,330	99.3%	502,905	99.21%
Total population	696,992	100%	645,862	100%	608,124	100%	561,258	100%	506,901	100%
Note: Totals greater than 100% due to multiple origin responses

== Services ==
The regional government, within its geographic area, has sole responsibility for the following:

- Durham Regional Police Service provides local policing for all municipalities.
  - The Ontario Provincial Police patrol provincial highways
- Durham Region Transit provides public transit service
- Main roads, traffic lights and controls
- Strategic land use planning
- Subdivision and condominium approval
- Water supply and distribution
- Sewage collection and treatment
- Collection of recyclable materials
- Waste collection, except in Whitby and Oshawa
- Waste disposal
- Public health and social services

The region also provides services in:

- Economic development
- Tourism

Local municipalities have responsibility for:

- Local planning
- Local streets and sidewalks
- Fire protection
- Parks and recreation
- Tax collection
- Building inspection and permits
- Public libraries
- Licensing
- Waste collection in Whitby and Oshawa

== Economy ==
With a current population of 700,000, the population is expected to exceed one million by 2041. Of considerable potential impact to the future of the economy in Durham Region is the proposed federal airport in north Pickering. The federal government acquired 18,600 acres of land in Pickering under Prime Minister Pierre Trudeau in 1972 for the construction of a future airport. However, the project has remained in limbo since and much of the land has been leased for farming. In January 2018, a report released by Urban Strategies, Inc. indicated that the Pickering airport lands provide the best opportunity to meet the growing demand for air travel and goods movement in the Greater Toronto Area, demand that Toronto Pearson airport will eventually be unable to accommodate.

As of December 2016, Durham Region had over 250 energy, environment, and engineering related businesses that employed over 11,000 individuals, making Durham Region the top employer of energy sector professionals in the Greater Toronto and Hamiton Area (GTHA). Durham Region's agricultural sector is one of the largest primary goods-producing sectors in the region. The agriculture sector is supported by local organizations such as Durham Farm Fresh who assist in the marketing, promotion, and advocacy for local food. The film industry is active and growing in Durham Region, due to increasing demands for locations and talent across Ontario. In June 2015, a major film studio development was announced in Pickering. Canada’s largest film industry backlot opened in Pickering in late 2021.

The innovative technology sector is emerging in Durham Region, supported by a Regional Innovation Centre in Oshawa and a technology accelerator in Whitby. Whitby is the location of the headquarters of 360 Insights a significant employer in Durham Region.

83 per cent of Durham residents over 18 have a certificate, diploma or degree.

The unemployment rate is 5.4% as of March 2022. Emerging employment sectors in Durham Region include sustainable energy, local food production, bio-sciences, next-generation automotive, logistics, advanced manufacturing, construction, and technology.

Major employers in Durham Region include General Motors of Canada, Ontario Power Generation, Lakeridge Health, Durham District School Board, Durham College, the Ontario Ministry of Finance, Minacs Worldwide, TDS Automotive, and University of Ontario Institute of Technology.

=== Manufacturing and energy industries ===
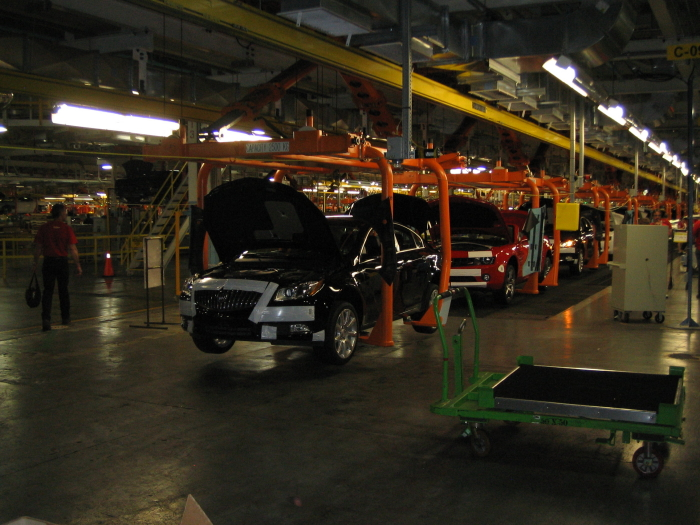
Vehicles being assembled at the General Motors factory in Oshawa, Ontario.

Durham Region is a major centre of the automotive industry in Canada. Oshawa is the Canadian headquarters of General Motors and home of what was once GM's largest plant in North America. In addition, the Canadian headquarters of Volkswagen is located in the region, BMW was located in the region until moving to Richmond Hill in 2010. The worldwide recession and spike in oil prices resulted in large-scale layoffs at GM beginning in 2008, along with the closure of the Oshawa Truck plant in 2009. This dramatically reduced employment levels at GM, and also resulted in significant employment losses and closures in the auto parts industry. On November 26, 2018, General Motors announced that no future product would be allotted to Oshawa beyond 2019 and that manufacturing operations would cease in December 2019. In October 2019, General Motors announced the construction of a 55-acre autonomous vehicle test track in Oshawa to be named the Canadian Technical Centre (CTC) McLaughlin Advanced Technology Track. GM Canada then reopened the plant in Oshawa and began manufacturing trucks in November 2021.

Durham Region is the Clean Energy Capital of Canada. Ontario Power Generation (OPG) is the largest employer in the region. OPG is Canada's largest owner of nuclear power plants with responsibility for operating the Pickering A, B, and Darlington nuclear generating stations, all of which are located in Durham Region. In June 2019 OPG announced it would be building a new corporate campus in Durham Region, in the Municipality of Clarington, by 2024. In 2023, Ontario Power Generation announced they were changing plans and had purchased the former General Motors Canada head office building and were updating it to be their new corporate headquarters. Ontario Tech University offers the first accredited program of its kind in Canada with an undergraduate degree program in Nuclear Engineering. It is also a leader is Energy Systems and Nuclear Science programs. The Clean Energy Research Lab (CERL) is a facility focused on pioneering clean energy research.

=== Tourism ===
Tourism is a significant economic sector in Durham Region. Durham Region currently hosts more than four million visitors each year, who spend over $300 million. A casino resort is under development in Durham Region which will include a casino resort, convention centre, film studios, indoor waterpark, cinemas, restaurants, office tower and an amphitheatre. The Pickering Casino Resort opened in July 2021, and the Hotel opened in January 2023 and construction of various associated amenities is ongoing.

=== Shopping ===
Major shopping centres located in Durham Region include:

- First Pickering Place (Pickering)
- Oshawa Power Centre (Oshawa)
- Oshawa Centre (Oshawa)
- Pickering Town Centre (Pickering)
- Thickson Centre (Whitby)
- Rio-Can Durham Centre (Ajax)
- The Bowmanville Mall (Bowmanville)
- Whitby Mall (Whitby)
- Durham Live (Pickering- Under Construction)

== Attractions ==
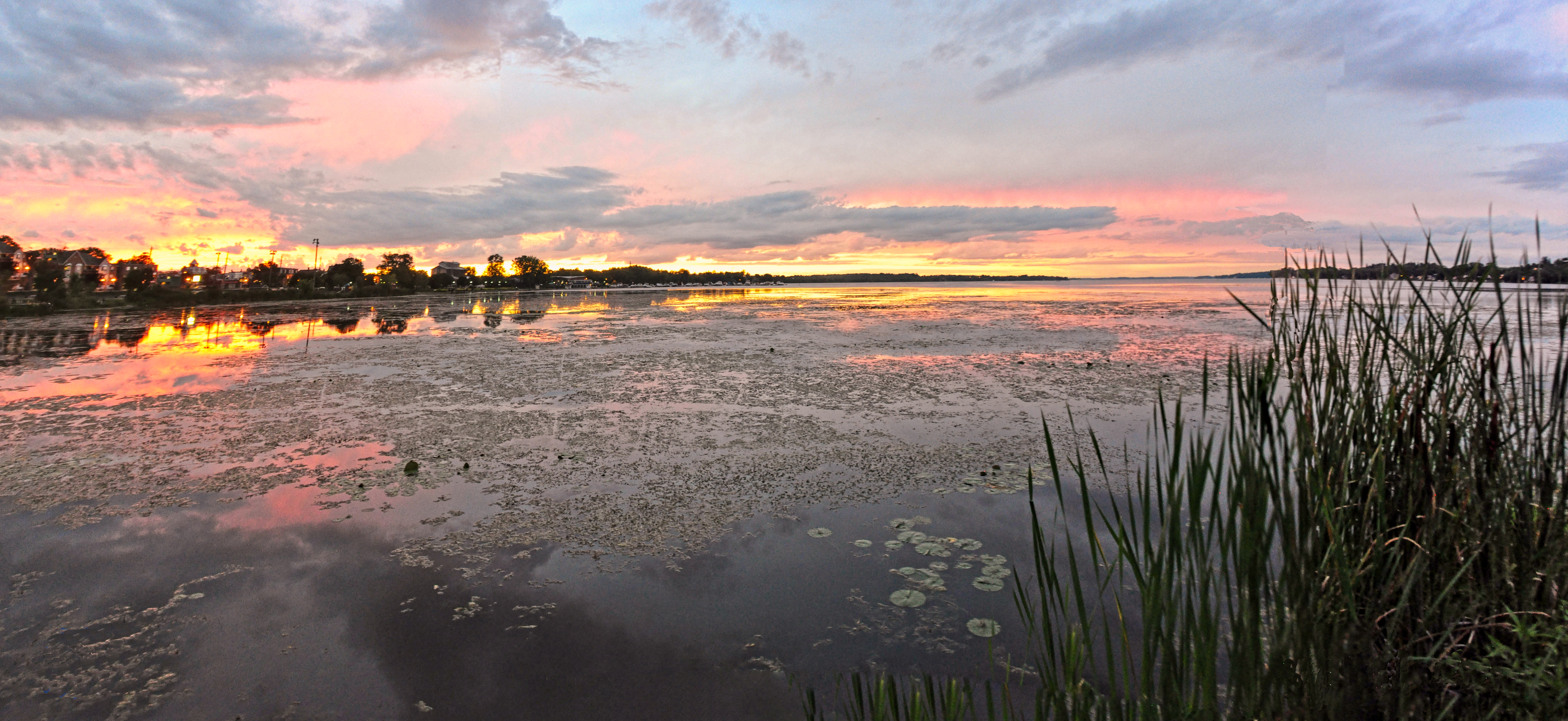
Lake Scugog

The top tourist attractions in Durham Region include Lake Ontario, Lake Scugog and Lake Simcoe, in particular for fishing. Outdoor activities such as hiking and skiing are popular in the region, in particular in Uxbridge, Ontario, which calls itself the Trail Capital of Canada. Darlington Provincial Park, Jungle Cat World, Parkwood Estate, The Robert McLaughlin Gallery, Canadian Tire Motorsport Park and the Canadian Automotive Museum are other popular attractions.

== Transportation ==
=== 400-series freeways ===
- Highway 401 traverses the region from west to east, entering in the Rouge Valley and exiting east of Newtonville.
- Highway 407, a privately owned toll freeway, enters the region south of Highway 7 and travels east to Durham Regional Road 1 (Brock Road) before transitioning to a provincially owned highway, Highway 407E. This route travels generally parallel to Highway 7 until the community of Brooklin in Whitby extending east to Highway 35 / 115 towards Lindsay and Peterborough.
- Highway 412, part of the Highway 407E project, connects south to Highway 401 parallel and east of Durham Regional Road 23 (Lakeridge Road).
- Highway 418, opened on December 9, 2019, is located approximately 1 km east of Durham Regional Road 34 (Courtice Road) and connects Highway 401 with Highway 407, with intermediate interchanges at Durham Highway 2 and Taunton Road.

=== Other highways ===
- Highway 7
- Highway 7A
- Highway 12
- Highway 35
- Highway 48
- Highway 115
- Highway 2 (now Durham Highway 2)
- Highway 47 (now Durham Highway 47)

This is the only region of the Greater Toronto Area where the Trans-Canada Highway passes through. The TC's Central Ontario Route enters from the northeast at Manilla along Highway 7, makes an abrupt turn near Sunderland onto Highway 12 heading north towards Beaverton and the northern regional boundary.

=== Public transportation ===
Public transit in the Region is operated by Durham Region Transit, which was formed in January 2006 when the five preexisting municipal public transit systems in the region were merged under the Region's administration.

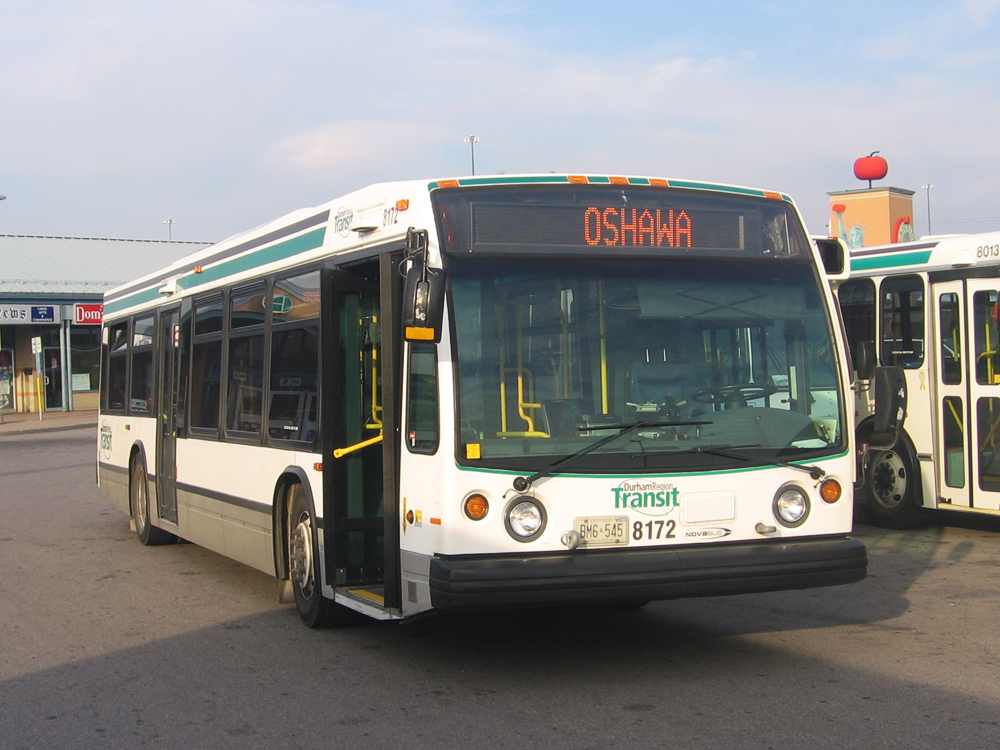
A DRT bus awaits passengers at the Ajax GO station

In addition, GO Transit provides the following services within the Region:

- Lakeshore East GO Trains serve Pickering, Ajax, Whitby, and Oshawa GO Stations, providing connections to Toronto's Union Station
- Morning Highway 401 peak hour service to Finch Bus Terminal from Oshawa GO Station via Whitby GO Station, Ajax GO Station and Scarborough Town Centre, with reverse service in the afternoon
- From September to April, weekday express service to the University of Ontario Institute of Technology and Durham College from Scarborough Centre Bus Terminal and additional peak-hour services to and from York University via Brooklin, Brougham, Unionville, and Richmond Hill
- Durham Highway 2/Kingston Road (the former provincial Highway 2) between Pickering and Oshawa is served by buses providing connections to the Toronto Transit Commission at Scarborough Town Centre, York Mills, and Yorkdale Shopping Centre
- Clarington is served by buses connecting with Lakeshore East GO Trains at Oshawa GO Station
- Port Perry in Scugog Township is served by buses from Whitby GO Station
- Uxbridge is served by buses from the Stouffville Corridor

=== Air travel ===
Although small airports such as the Oshawa Executive Airport exist in Durham Region, the main airport serving the region is Toronto Pearson International Airport. There is a long-standing proposal for a major new airport in Pickering.

=== Maritime Infrastructure ===
Durham Region also has a small maritime industry centered on the Port of Oshawa. The port received around 50 lake freighters per year between 2007 and 2017 and acts as an export terminal for agricultural products from Durham and nearby regions.

== Education ==
The Durham District School Board operates all English-language secular public schools within Durham Region, except for those schools within Clarington, which are part of the Kawartha Pine Ridge District School Board. This is a holdover from the pre-1974 structure in which the area now forming Clarington was part of Durham County, while the other municipalities were part of Ontario County.

The Durham Catholic District School Board operates the separate English-language public Catholic school system within Durham Region, again with the exception of schools in Clarington, which are part of the Peterborough Victoria Northumberland and Clarington Catholic District School Board.

Neither school board is an operating division of the regional government. Instead, as is true of all school boards in Ontario, they are separate entities with distinct but overlapped service areas. Elected public trustees responsible for their operation.

French-language school boards serving the municipality include the Conseil scolaire Viamonde and the Conseil scolaire catholique MonAvenir.

Durham Secondary Academy and Middle School offers private elementary and secondary education for students in the Region of Durham.

The region also is home to Ontario Tech University, Ontario's fastest growing university, Durham College, and Trent University Durham (Trent University's main campus is in Peterborough). The Ontario Tech and Durham College main campuses are located in north Oshawa. Durham College also has a satellite campus in Whitby, and Ontario Tech has one in Downtown Oshawa.

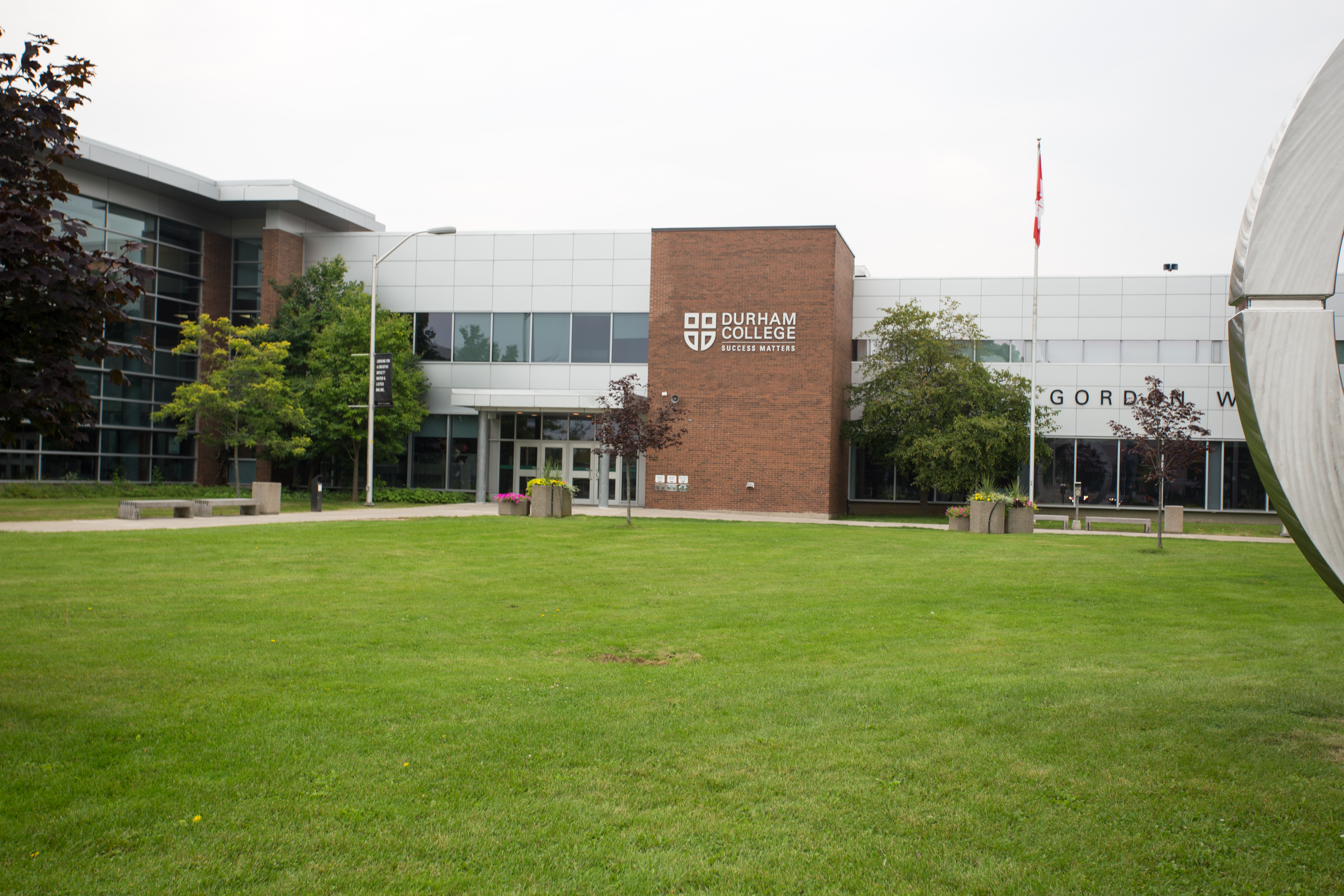
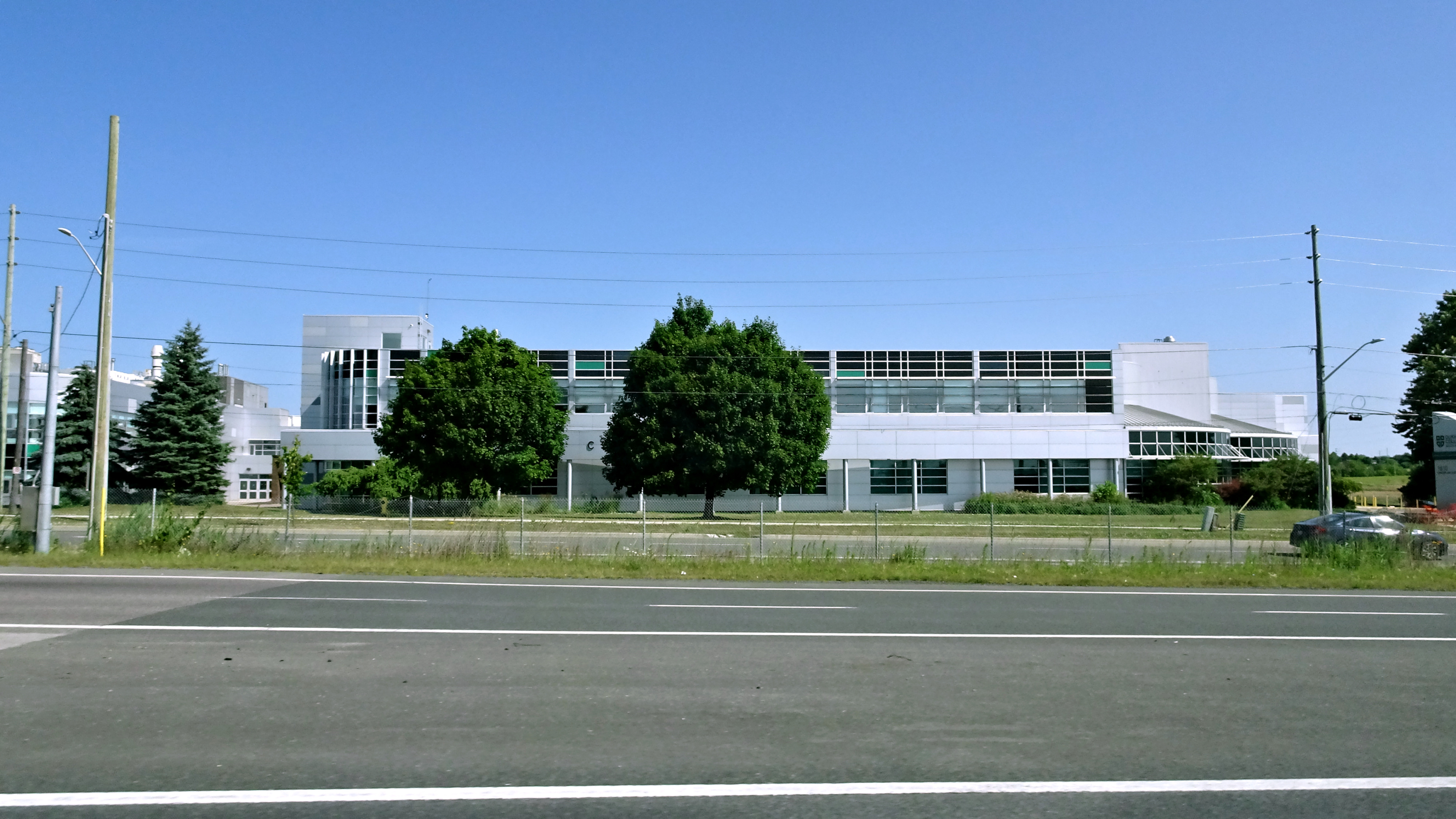
Durham College has two campuses in Durham Region, the Oshawa Campus (left), located in North Oshawa, and the Whitby Campus (right), located in south Whitby.

Ontario Tech University is a science, technology engineering and math (STEM)-focused, research driven institution. Ontario Tech is home to the [ACE Climatic Wind Tunnel, a research, development and testing facility available for rent to manufacturers of all descriptions, startup companies and researchers in Canada and around the globe. Ontario Tech University is rated number 1 in cross-sector research among Canadian undergraduate universities. Within 15 years of its founding, Ontario Tech quickly earned a reputation for computer science, ranking among the top 10 programs in Canada and 4th in Ontario.

Durham College has campuses in Oshawa and Whitby, and has nine academic schools across a wide range of disciplines.

Trent University Durham offers full and part-time undergraduate programs, as well as post-graduate certificates. Other key programs at Trent University Durham include Bachelors of Business Administration, Computing Systems, and Communications & Critical Thinking as well as a Master of Management, which is a 16 month professional master program. Trent University Durham announced in 2019 plans to expand their campus in Oshawa to include 200 on-campus residences, "creative learning spaces", and academic space.

== See also ==
- List of municipalities in Ontario
- Proposal for the Province of Toronto
- List of townships in Ontario
