= London District, Upper Canada =

Former District in Upper Canada

Coordinates: 43.4°N 81.2°W

London District
- Former District in Upper Canada
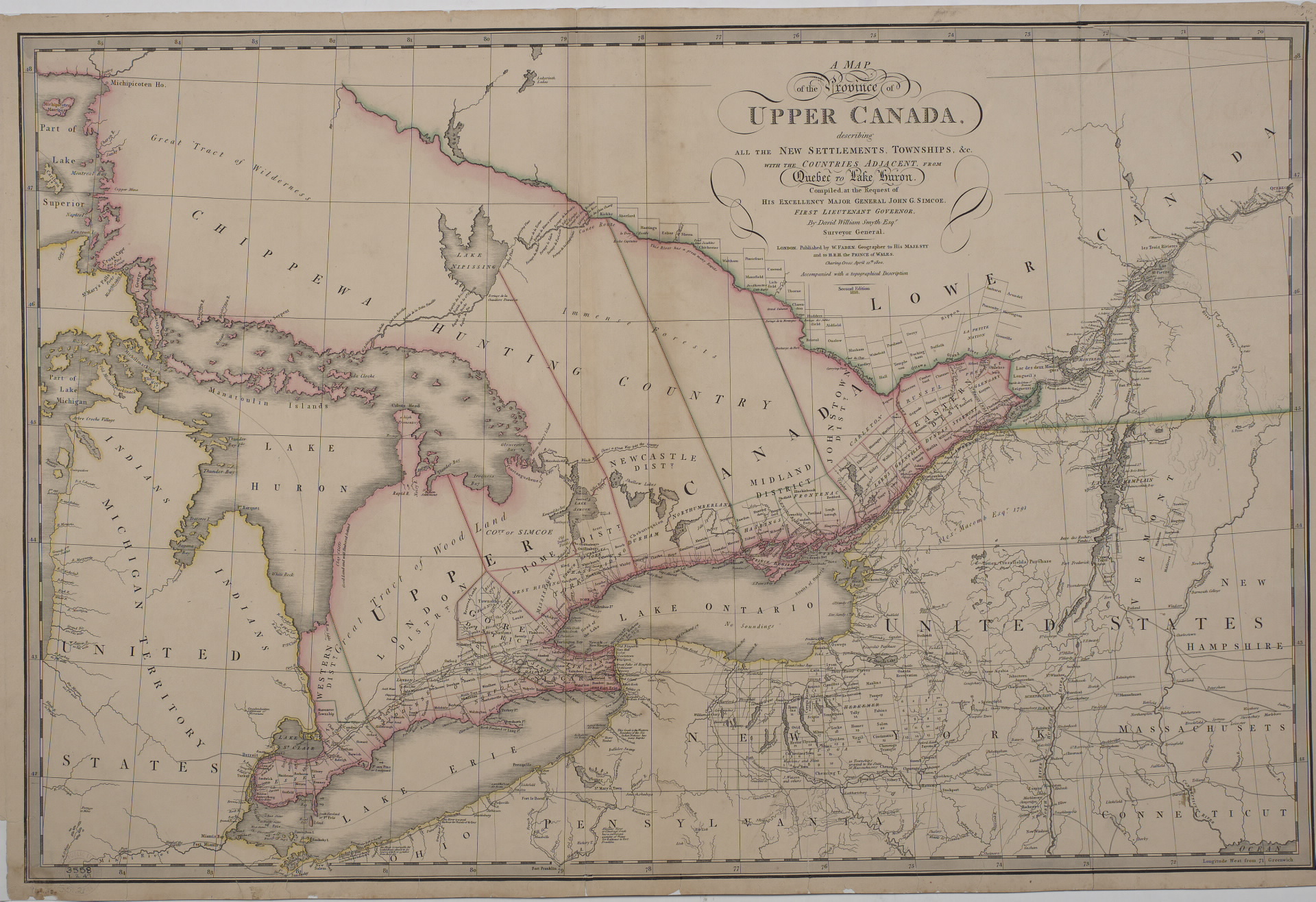
- Map of Upper Canada Identifying its districts, counties and townships (1818)
- Interactive map of London District
- Established: 1798
- Dissolved: 1849

The London District was a historic district in Upper Canada. It was formed in 1798 from parts of the Home and Western Districts, and lasted until its abolition in 1850.

== Historic evolution ==
The District was formed by an Act of the Parliament of Upper Canada in 1798, and was described as consisting of

...the Counties of Norfolk, Oxford and Middlesex with so much of this Province as lies to the Westward of the Home District, and the District of Niagara, to the Southward of Lake Huron, and between them and a line drawn due north of a fixed boundary (where the easternmost limit of the township of Oxford intersects the River Thames till it arrives at Lake Huron...

The townships and counties were thus organized:

Counties of the London District (1798)
Norfolk County	Oxford County	Middlesex County
Rainham; Walpole; Woodhouse; Charlotteville; Walsingham; Houghton; Middleton; Windham; Townsend	Burford; Norwich; Dereham; Oxford upon the Thames; Blandford; Blenheim	London; Westminster; Dorchester; Yarmouth; Southwold; Dunwich; Aldborough; Delaware

The district town was Charlotteville (later named Turkey Point), but moved to Tisdale's Mills (later named Vittoria) in 1815. In 1826, the district town was moved to London, and the townships of Rainham and Walpole were moved to Haldimand County in Niagara District because of their distance from London.

The Huron Tract, being developed at the time by the Canada Company, was divided between the London and Western Districts in 1835, with the greater part of the territory in the London District forming the new Huron County. That County was later withdrawn in October 1841 to form the new Huron District.

In 1837, Oxford County was separated into the new Brock District, and Norfolk County was separated to form Talbot District.

In 1840, the following lands were withdrawn from London District and attached to Waterloo County in Wellington District:

- reserved lands west of Woolwich and Nichol
- the triangular piece of land adjoining the said tract in the proposed District of Huron
- part of the late purchase from the Indians of Gore, and part of Indian lands

In 1845, the District was restricted in area to cover Middlesex County only. thus detaching the remainder of its northern part extending to Lake Huron. This was rectified by the territory's attachment to Huron District in 1846.

At the beginning of 1850, the district was abolished, being replaced by the United Counties of Middlesex and Elgin and in 1850 as standalone Middlesex County for municipal purposes.
