= Regional Municipality of Haldimand–Norfolk =

- Dissolved Region
- Municipal Boundaries of the former Regional Municipality of Haldimand–Norfolk.
- Country: Canada
- Province: Ontario
- Region: Golden Horseshoe
- Created: January 1, 1974
- Dissolved: January 1, 2001

Area
  - Total: 1,118.31 km^{2} (431.78 sq mi)

Population (1996)
  - Total: 102,575
- Time zone: UTC−05:00 (EST)
  - Summer (DST): UTC−04:00 (DST)
- Area codes: (905), (289), and (365) plus (519), (226), and (548)
- Seat: Simcoe
- Municipalities: Simcoe, Nanticoke, Haldimand, Dunnville, Delhi Township, Norfolk Township

The Regional Municipality of Haldimand–Norfolk was a Regional Municipality that was proclaimed on January 1, 1974 in the province of Ontario, Canada, on the advice of a report by Milt Farrow, a "special advisor" appointed by the Government of Ontario. In 2001, the Region was dissolved and split into two single-tier municipalities, the Town of Haldimand and the Town of Norfolk. Immediately after their formation, they changed their names to Haldimand County and Norfolk County.

== Overview ==
Under this arrangement, the Regional Municipality of Haldimand–Norfolk was established as an upper-tier municipality and comprised the former Haldimand and Norfolk Counties, which they superseded. Its lower-tier municipalities were: the city of Nanticoke, the town of Haldimand, the town of Dunnville, the town of Simcoe, and the townships of Delhi and Norfolk.

The Region was responsible for providing police services, public transit, and social services, while the lower-tier municipalities were responsible for fire and recreation services; although both tiers shared the responsibility for maintaining roads and water. It was governed by a Regional Chair who presided over a Regional Council with representatives from each of the constituent municipalities.

== History ==
The Regional Municipality of Haldimand–Norfolk was created by Act of the Legislative Assembly of Ontario in 1973, which took effect on January 1, 1974. The creation of the Regional Municipality resulted in the consolidation of the former municipalities of Haldimand and Norfolk Counties into six new municipalities:

Creation of area municipalities in the Regional Municipality of Haldimand–Norfolk (1974)
Area municipality	Created from	Police villages dissolved
Township of Delhi	Town of Delhi, annexing portions of the Townships of Charlotteville, Middleton, South Walsingham and Windham	
City of Nanticoke	Village of Jarvis, Town of Port Dover, Town of Waterford, annexing portions of the Townships of Rainham, Townsend, Walpole, and Woodhouse	
Town of Dunnville	Town of Dunnville, Townships of Canborough, Dunn, Moulton, and Sherbrooke	
Town of Haldimand	Town of Caledonia, Village of Cayuga, Village of Hagersville, Townships of North Cayuga, Oneida, Seneca, and South Cayuga, annexing portions of the Townships of Rainham and Walpole	
Township of Norfolk	Village of Port Rowan, Townships of Houghton, North Walsingham, annexing portions of the Townships of Middleton and South Walsingham	Canfield; Fisherville; Saint Williams; Selkirk; Vittoria
City of Simcoe	City of Simcoe	

== Dissolution ==
In the early 2000s, a new Progressive Conservative government was responsible for amalgamating and dissolving most Regional Municipalities from 2000 to 2001, with Ottawa-Carleton, Hamilton–Wentworth, Sudbury, and others being dissolved. Metropolitan Toronto was the first Regional Municipality to be amalgamated out of the bunch in 1998.
