= Whitby Mall =

Shopping mall in Whitby, Ontario, Canada

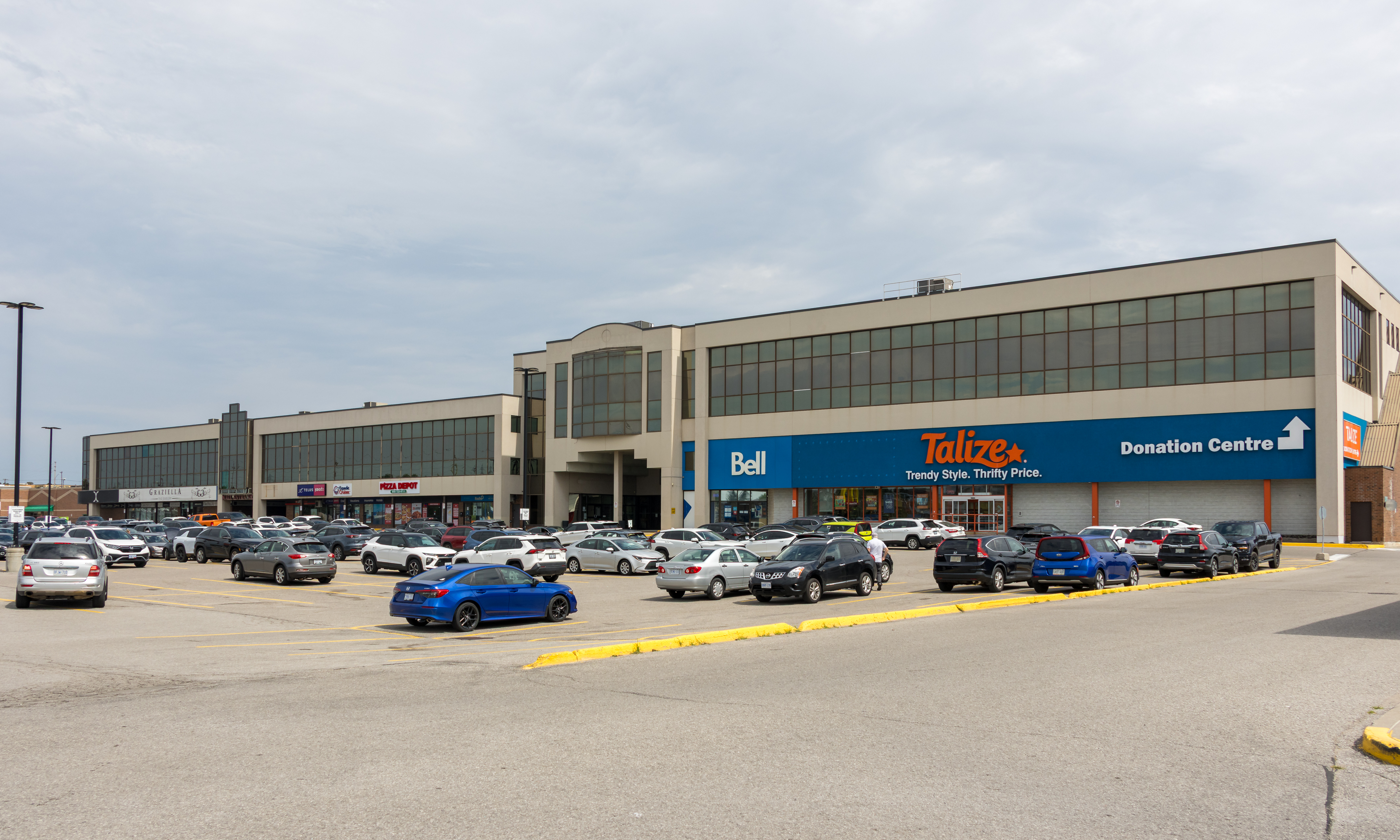
- Coordinates: 43°53′06″N 78°54′36″W
- Address: 1615 Dundas Street East; Whitby, Ontario; L1N 2L1
- Opened: 1970
- Manager: First Capital
- Owner: First Capital
- Num. of anchor tenants: 3
- Floor area: 36,660 m^{2} (394,600 sq ft)
- Floors: 2

The Whitby Mall Shopping Centre is a shopping mall located in Whitby, Ontario, Canada.

== History ==
The Whitby Mall is composed of a ground floor of enclosed retail space and an upper floor of commercial office space. It opened in 1970, with roughly twenty stores and Woolco and Miracle Food Mart serving as anchor tenants. It underwent its first major expansion in 1980, which included the addition of the Lang Tower east wing, housing corporate and medical offices. A second wave of renovations began in the mid-1980s, with over 50 stores operating by 1988. The project was led by Anthony Lang, president of Tije Ltd., the company that owned and managed the mall at the time.

By 2000, anchor tenant Walmart had been replaced with a Sobeys that lacks direct access to the mall, and commercial office tenants began to close or relocate, leading to a decline in customers and tenancy at Whitby Mall. Though the mall experienced an upswing in store occupancy by the end of the decade following the opening of a ServiceOntario location, by 2017 it was cited by the Toronto Star as a mall "struggling to survive" amid the retail apocalypse of the 2010s.

In 2016, the Whitby Mall was acquired by the real estate firm First Capital. The firm indicated in 2017 that it has long-term plans to redevelop Whitby Mall into a mixed-use development, similarly to its previous conversion of Hazelton Lanes to Yorkville Village in 2016.

=== Notable incidents ===
In 2016, the McDonald's location at the Whitby Mall received an unannounced visit from Canadian Prime Minister at the time Justin Trudeau, which was covered by the CBC.

On July 3, 2019, a shooting occurred during a dispute in the Whitby Mall's parking lot. The two suspects in the incident were arrested in Owen Sound on July 6, 2019, on multiple firearms-related charges.

== Anchors ==
=== Current ===
- Sobeys
- Talize

=== Former ===
- Miracle Food Mart
- Staples (replaced by Talize)
- Walmart (replaced by Sobeys)
- Woolco (replaced by Walmart)
- Lastman's Bad Boy (closed in 2024)

== Transportation access ==
Whitby Mall is located in Whitby, Ontario, and is accessed by Dundas Street East to the north, Thickson Road South to the west, and Nichol Avenue to the south. There is controlled access to the mall with a traffic light at Thickson Road South.
