= Regional municipality =

Canadian form of government analogous to county

A regional municipality (or region) is a type of Canadian municipal government similar to and at the same municipal government level as a county, although the specific structure and servicing responsibilities may vary from place to place. Regional municipalities were formed in highly populated areas where it was considered more efficient to provide certain services, such as water, emergency services, and waste management over an area encompassing more than one local municipality. For this reason, regions may be involved in providing services to residents and businesses.

Regional municipalities, where and when they include lower-tier municipalities within their boundaries, are sometimes referred to as upper-tier municipalities. Regional municipalities generally have more servicing responsibilities than counties. Typical services include maintenance and construction of arterial roads (including urban areas), transit, policing, sewer and water systems, waste disposal, region-wide land-use planning and development and health and social services.

Regions are more urbanized than counties and are implemented in census divisions where an interconnected cluster of urban centres forms most of the division's area and population.

== Alberta ==
Alberta does not have an official municipal status type of regional municipality. However, that has not prevented one municipality from branding itself as one. Wood Buffalo, formed as a specialized municipality on April 1, 1995, through the amalgamation of the City of Fort McMurray and Improvement District No. 143, changed its official name from Municipality of Wood Buffalo to Regional Municipality of Wood Buffalo on August 14, 1996, while maintaining its specialized municipality status.

== British Columbia ==
There is only one regional municipality in British Columbia, the Northern Rockies Regional Municipality (NRRM), formerly a regional district of the same name. Unlike other Canadian regional municipalities it is near-entirely wilderness and has only one "urban" centre, the former Town of Fort Nelson. Only sparsely populated outside Fort Nelson, it is vast in extent, covering the northeastern corner of the province north of the 58th Parallel, from the Grand Canyon of the Liard on the west to the Alberta boundary on the east.

Regional districts, which cover most of the rest of the province, are technically municipalities, though containing other municipalities within them. In the NRRM the government of the former Fort Nelson and the regional municipality are merged. Like regional districts, the regional municipality does not include Indian Reserves or their governments.

== Nova Scotia ==
In Nova Scotia, regional municipalities are a single level of government, and provide all municipal services to their communities. As they include both urban centres and rural areas, they are not called cities, towns or villages. Such municipalities in Nova Scotia take over the area and name of a county. Counties still exist as a geographic division but may contain a single municipality or may be divided into municipal districts within them.

== Ontario ==
Map showing Ontario's eight regions

In Ontario, regional municipalities are upper-tier municipalities that always contain lower-tier municipalities within them, and were created to provide common services to mixed urban and rural divisions in the way that counties typically provide common services to fully rural municipalities (this paradoxically gives many of the largest urban areas in the province a subtle semi-rural character, such as the presence of numbered county roads with rural-type signage within them). Today, only certain predominantly urban divisions containing two or more urban municipalities but lack a defined core city are given the status of a regional municipality; most census divisions instead retain the status of a county or a district. However, there is one district municipality, the District Municipality of Muskoka that has the same structure as a regional municipality, but is predominantly rural or wilderness.

The specific relationship of a regional government and the cities, towns, townships and villages within its borders is determined by provincial legislation; typically the regional municipality provides many core services such as police protection, waste management and (in some RMs) public transit. Similar to counties, they also provide infrastructure for major roads, sewers, and bridges and also handle social services. Organization of regional government has occasionally been controversial, as council membership is sometimes determined by the constituent municipalities rather than elected directly.

The province's first regional municipality, the Municipality of Metropolitan Toronto, was created in 1954, by severing Toronto and its surrounding suburban townships from the southern portion of York County. It was the only regional municipality in the province until the Regional Municipality of Ottawa–Carleton was created in 1969 by restructuring Ottawa and the whole of Carleton County. Between 1970 and 1974, several more regional municipalities were created by the government of Bill Davis, mostly by restructuring the entirety of existing counties.

The later government of Mike Harris subsequently dissolved four regional municipalities with a dominant central city that formed metropolitan areas into amalgamated single-tier cities. In 1998, the Municipality of Metropolitan Toronto became the amalgamated City of Toronto, and in 2001, three other regional municipalities—Ottawa–Carleton, Hamilton–Wentworth and Sudbury—were similarly amalgamated into the single-tier cities of Ottawa, Hamilton and Greater Sudbury.

The Harris government also split the Regional Municipality of Haldimand–Norfolk (an anomalous predominantly-rural RM) into two separate single-tier municipalities—the Town of Haldimand and the Town of Norfolk, which immediately changed their names to Haldimand County and Norfolk County.

In January 2019, the provincial government announced a review of the eight regional municipalities in the province (Durham, Halton, Muskoka, Niagara, Oxford, Peel, Waterloo, and York) and Simcoe County, as well as their constituent lower-tier municipalities. The review will be headed by special advisers Ken Seiling and Michael Fenn, who will conduct consultations with politicians, civil servants, business owners, and residents of the nine affected municipalities.

In 2022, the More Homes Built Faster Act received royal assent and will remove most planning responsibilities from seven upper-tier municipalities (Durham, Halton, Niagara, Peel, Simcoe, Waterloo, and York) at a still undetermined date.

== Quebec ==
In Quebec, regional county municipalities or RCMs (French, municipalités régionales de comté, MRC) have constituted the "county" level of government for the entire province since the early 1980s.

== See also ==
- History of cities in Canada
- Origins of names of cities in Canada
- List of cities and towns of Upper Canada
- List of city nicknames in Canada
- List of cities in North America
- List of the largest cities and towns in Canada by area
- List of the largest municipalities in Canada by population
- List of the largest population centres in Canada
- List of metropolitan areas in Canada
- List of largest Canadian cities by census
- Population of Canada by province and territory
- Population of Canada by year
- List of cities in Canada
- List of towns in Canada
