= Ontario County, Ontario =

Former counties in Ontario, Canada

Ontario County was the name of two historic counties in the Canadian province of Ontario. Both counties were located in approximately the same area and existed on-and-off between 1792 and 1974. Their primary modern successor is the Regional Municipality of Durham, though certain parts of them were transferred to other surrounding regions.

== Ontario County (1792–1800) ==
Ontario County
- County
- Interactive map of Ontario County
- Coordinates: 43°55′N 78°56′W
- Colonial territories: British North America
- Colony: Upper Canada
- Established: 1792
- Time zone: UTC−05:00 (EST)
  - Summer (DST): UTC−04:00 (EDT)

The original Ontario County, located in the Midland District, was constituted in 1792 as an electoral district for the new Legislative Assembly of Upper Canada:

... which county is to consist of the following islands: an island at present known by the name of isle Tonti, to be called Amherst island; an island known by the name of isle au Forest, to be called Gage island; an island known by the name of Grand island, to be called Wolfe island; an island known by the name of isle Cauchois, to be called Howe island; and to comprehend all the islands between the mouth of the Gananoque to the easternmost extremity of the late township of Marysburgh, called point Pleasant.

In 1798, the Parliament of Upper Canada dissolved the county, and redistributed its territory to the following electoral counties and townships, effective at the beginning of 1800:

County	Territory	Disposition
Frontenac	Howe Island, and so much of the present county of Ontario as is wholly, or in greater part opposite to the present township of Pittsburg	part of the township of Pittsburg
Frontenac	Wolfe Island and Gage Island, and so much of the said county of Ontario as is wholly, or in greater part opposite to the present township of Kingston	formation of the township of Wolfe Island
Lennox and Addington	the residue of the said county of Ontario	formation of the township of Amherst Island

== Ontario County (1852–1974) ==
Ontario County
- Dissolved County
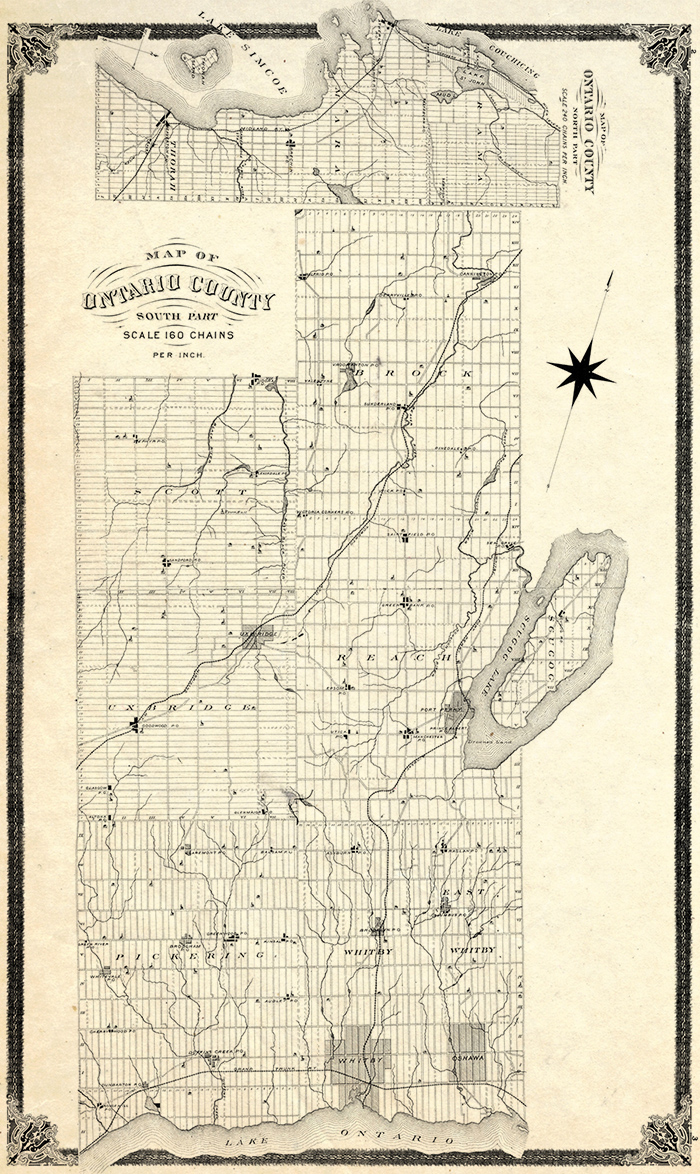
- Ontario County Map (1877)
- Coordinates: 43°55′N 78°56′W
- Federal (1867–present) British Colony (1852–1867): Canada; United Provinces of Canada
- Province: Ontario (1867–present); Canada West (1852–1867)
- Established: 1852 (created from York County)
- Dissolved: 1974 (reorganized into the Regional Municipality of Durham)
- Seat: Whitby
- Time zone: UTC−05:00 (EST)
  - Summer (DST): UTC−04:00 (EDT)

On January 1, 1852, the old County of York was divided into three counties (York, Ontario and Peel); however they remained united. On January 1, 1854, Ontario County separated and became its own independent county, with the support of Peter Perry of Whitby. The population in 1854 was 30,000 and the first County Warden was Thomas N. Gibbs.

It was replaced by the Regional Municipality of Durham effective January 1, 1974.

=== Original townships ===
- Brock, area 66,120 acres (268 km^{2}) Surveyed in 1817. Community centres: Cannington, Vroomanton, Pinedale, Sunderland, Wick.
- Mara, area 62,115 acres (251 km^{2}). Surveyed in part in 1820; the survey was completed in 1836. The Township might have been named in honour of Gertrud Elisabeth Mara, or for the Spanish word for sea. Community centres were: Gamebridge, Brechin, Atherley, Udney and Rathburn.
- Pickering, area 72,049 acres (292 km^{2}). Opened in 1792 and first called Edinburgh it was renamed after the English town in Yorkshire. Community centres: Pickering, Dunbarton, Green River, Balsam, Claremont, Brougham, Altona.
- Rama, area 37,769 acres (153 km^{2}). Opened in 1820. Rama is the Spanish name for the branch of a tree. Surveyed in 1834 and 1855. The area was first settled by retired British officers, but they ran into difficulties with the Bank of Upper Canada. The Bank sold the land to the Indian Department and the Ojibwe First Nations at Orillia were removed to a village built for them in 1838. Community centres: Floral Park, Longford Mills, Cooper's Falls, Washago.
- Reach area 63,144 acres (256 km^{2}) Opened in 1809 and named after the village in Bedfordshire, England. Community centres: Port Perry, Manchester, Saintfield, Utica.
- Scott area 49,291 acres (199 km^{2}). Opened in 1820. Believed to be named after Thomas Scott, Chief Justice of Upper Canada from 1806 to 1816. Community centres: Zephyr, Sandford, Leaskdale, Udora.
- Thorah, area 32,468 acres (131 km^{2}) Opened in 1820 and named form the Hebrew word signifying the inspired Law, the Pentateuch. Community centres: Beaverton.
- Uxbridge, area 51,969 acres (210 km^{2}) Opened in 1798 and named after the English town. Early settlers included Pennsylvania Quakers. New Yorkers settled in 1806. Community Centres: Uxbridge, Goodwood.
- Whitby, Area 31,386 acres (127 km^{2}). Opened in 1792 and named for an English seaport. Community centres: Oshawa, Whitby, Brooklin, Ashburn and Myrtle.

The Town of Oshawa was also located in the county.

In 1855 the Town of Whitby was incorporated in part of Whitby Township. Scugog Township was formed from a portion of Reach Township and Cartwright Township in adjoining Northumberland and Durham County in 1856. And in 1858, the Township of East Whitby was formed from the eastern portion of Whitby Township.

A number of villages were also incorporated as separate municipalities in the county after it was created: Port Perry in 1871, Uxbridge in 1872, Cannington in 1878 and Beaverton in 1884. In the 20th century, the wartime town of Ajax, located in Pickering Township, was incorporated as an improvement district in 1950. It became a town in 1955. The Village of Pickering was incorporated as a village in 1953.

On January 1, 1974, the portion of Ontario County south of the Trent–Severn Waterway and about half of adjacent Durham County were amalgamated as the Regional Municipality of Durham. The remaining portions of Durham County were transferred to other neighbouring counties, and the portion of Ontario County north of the Trent–Severn Waterway (Rama and Mara Townships) was transferred to Simcoe County. In addition, the part of Pickering Township west of the Rouge River (West Rouge and Port Union) was transferred to the Borough of Scarborough in the Municipality of Metropolitan Toronto. At this time Ontario and Durham counties were dissolved.

Whitby served as the "County Town" or county seat and as such was the location for the county offices, courthouse and land registry office. It continues in this role for Durham Region today.

== See also ==
- List of census divisions of Ontario
- List of townships in Ontario
