= List of census divisions of Ontario =

First-level administrative divisions of Ontario
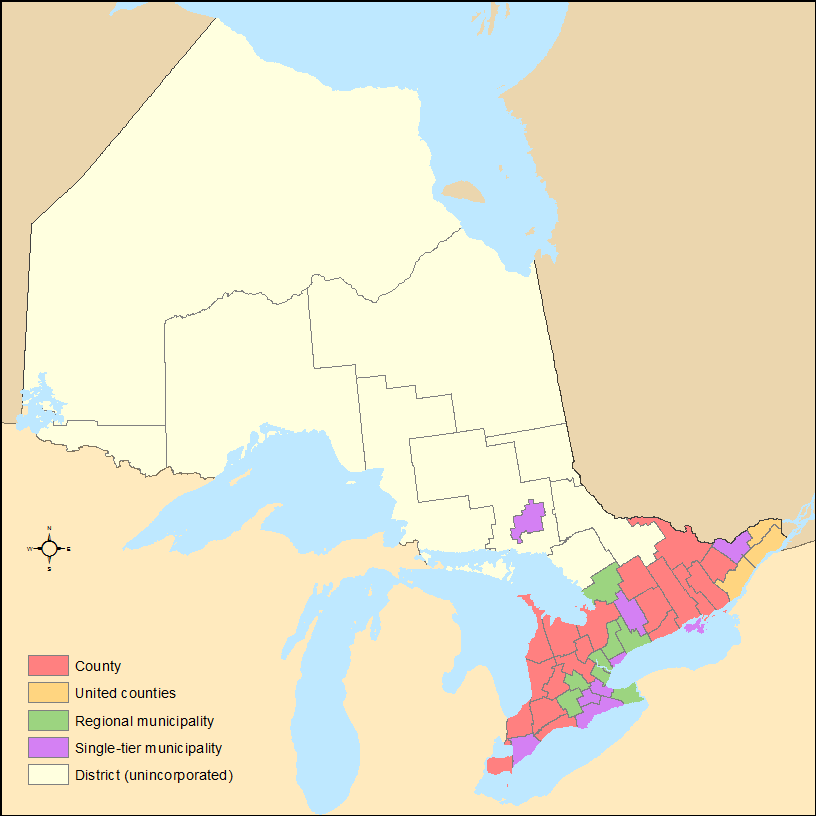
- Location: Province of Ontario
- Number: 51
- Populations: 13,935 (Manitoulin District) – 2,794,356 (City of Toronto)
- Areas: 631.10 km^{2} (City of Toronto) – 395,432.07 km^{2} (Kenora District)

The Province of Ontario has 51 first-level administrative divisions, which collectively cover the whole province. With two exceptions, (Note: Statistics Canada treats Norfolk County and Haldimand County as one single census division; the County of Brant and City of Brantford are also treated as one single census division. There would otherwise be 51 census divisions instead of the 49 official ones used by Statistics Canada.) their areas match the 49 census divisions Statistics Canada has for Ontario.

The Province has four types of first-level division: single-tier municipalities, regional municipalities, counties, and districts. The first three are types of municipal government but districts are not—they are defined geographic areas (some quite large) used in many contexts. The last three have within them multiple smaller, lower-tier municipalities but the single-tier municipalities do not. Regional municipalities and counties differ primarily in the services that they provide to their residents. (Lower-tier municipalities are generally treated as census subdivisions by Statistics Canada.)

In some cases, an administrative division may retain its historical name even if it changes government type. For instance, Oxford County, Haldimand County, Norfolk County and Prince Edward County are no longer counties: Oxford is a regional municipality and the others are single-tier municipalities. Several administrative divisions in Ontario have significantly changed their borders or have been discontinued entirely. See: Historic counties of Ontario.

== Types of administrative divisions ==
=== Single-tier municipalities ===
Single-tier municipalities of Ontario
- Location: Province of Ontario
- Number: 11
- Populations: 25,704 (Prince Edward County) – 2,794,356 (City of Toronto)
- Areas: 631.10 km^{2} (City of Toronto) – 3,196.85 km^{2} (City of Greater Sudbury)
- Government: Municipal government
- Subdivisions: None

A single-tier municipality is governed by one municipal administration, with neither a county nor regional government above it, nor further municipal subdivisions below it (cf. independent city). Single-tier municipalities are either former regional municipalities or counties whose municipal governments were amalgamated in the 1990s into a single administration. Some single-tier municipalities (e.g., Toronto, Ottawa, Hamilton, Greater Sudbury) were created where a former regional municipality consisted of a single dominant urban centre and its suburbs or satellite towns or villages, while others (e.g., Brant County, Chatham-Kent, Haldimand-Norfolk, Kawartha Lakes, and Prince Edward County) were created from predominantly rural divisions with a collection of distinct communities.

A single-tier municipality should not be confused with a separated municipality; such municipalities are considered as part of their surrounding county for census purposes, but are not administratively connected to the county.

With the exception of Greater Sudbury, single-tier municipalities that are not considered to be part of a county, regional municipality, or district are found only in Southern Ontario.

Current single-tier municipalities in Ontario that are also census divisions:

Single-tier municipality	Population (2021)	Area (km^{2})	Density (/km^{2})	Seat	Secondary region	Primary region
Municipality of Chatham-Kent (Note: Formerly Kent County)	104,316	2,464.53	42.3	Chatham	Southwestern	Southern
City of Greater Sudbury (Note: Formerly Regional Municipality of Sudbury)	166,128	3,196.85	52.0	Sudbury	Northeastern	Northern
Haldimand-Norfolk (Note: Formerly the Regional Municipality of Haldimand-Norfolk)	116,872	2,883.80	40.5	Cayuga, Simcoe	Southwestern	Southern
City of Hamilton (Note: Formerly the Regional Municipality of Hamilton–Wentworth)	569,353	1,118.31	509.1	Hamilton	Golden Horseshoe	Southern
City of Kawartha Lakes (Note: Formerly Victoria County)	79,247	3,033.66	26.1	Lindsay	Central	Southern
City of Ottawa (Note: Formerly the Regional Municipality of Ottawa-Carleton)	1,017,449	2,788.20	364.9	Ottawa	Eastern	Southern
Prince Edward County	25,704	1,052.61	24.4	Picton	Central	Southern
County of Brant	144,771	1,094.10	132.3	Burford	Southwestern	Southern
City of Toronto (Note: Formerly Metropolitan Toronto)	2,794,356	631.10	4,427.8	Toronto	Golden Horseshoe	Southern

=== Regional municipalities ===
Regional municipalities of Ontario
- Location: Province of Ontario
- Number: 8
- Populations: 66,674 (District Municipality of Muskoka) – 1,451,022 (Peel)
- Areas: 965.71 km^{2} (Halton) – 3,839.47 km^{2} (District Municipality of Muskoka)
- Government: Municipal government
- Subdivisions: Lower-tier municipalities

Regional municipalities (or regions) are upper-tier municipalities that generally have more servicing responsibilities than the counties. They generally provide the following services: maintenance and construction of arterial roads in both rural and urban areas, transit, policing, sewer and water systems, waste disposal, region-wide land use planning and development, as well as health and social services. Regions are typically more urbanized than counties. Regional municipalities are typically an administrative division where an interconnected cluster of urban centres or suburbs forms the majority of the division's area and population, but no single centre is overwhelmingly dominant over the others. Regional municipalities are found only in Southern Ontario.

Although Oxford County and the District Municipality of Muskoka are not called regions, they are defined as regional municipalities under Part 1, Section 1 of the Municipal Act, 2001.

Between 1998 and 2001, four regional municipalities that formed their own central city-dominated metropolitan areas were amalgamated and are now single-tier municipalities.

- In 1998, the Municipality of Metropolitan Toronto became the amalgamated City of Toronto.
- In 2001, the Regional Municipality of Ottawa–Carleton became the City of Ottawa, the Regional Municipality of Hamilton–Wentworth became the City of Hamilton, and the Regional Municipality of Sudbury became the City of Greater Sudbury. At the same time, the Regional Municipality of Haldimand–Norfolk was split into Haldimand County and Norfolk County.

Current regional municipalities in Ontario:

Regional municipality	Population (2021)	Area (km^{2})	Density (/km^{2})	Regional seat	Secondary region	Primary region
Regional Municipality of Durham	696,992	2,521.11	276.5	Whitby	Golden Horseshoe	Southern
Regional Municipality of Halton	596,637	965.71	617.8	Oakville	Golden Horseshoe	Southern
District Municipality of Muskoka	66,674	3,839.47	17.4	Bracebridge	Northeastern / Central	Northern
Regional Municipality of Niagara	477,941	1,852.82	258.0	Thorold	Golden Horseshoe	Southern
Oxford County	121,781	2,038.18	59.7	Woodstock	Southwestern	Southern
Regional Municipality of Peel	1,451,022	1,247.45	1,163.2	Brampton	Golden Horseshoe	Southern
Regional Municipality of Waterloo	587,165	1,370.07	428.6	Kitchener	Southwestern	Southern
Regional Municipality of York	1,173,334	1,758.27	667.3	Newmarket	Golden Horseshoe	Southern

=== Counties ===
Counties of Ontario
- Location: Province of Ontario
- Number: 22
- Populations: 20,571 (Haliburton) – 533,169 (Simcoe)
- Areas: 1,486.77 km^{2} (Dufferin) – 7,357.94 km^{2} (Renfrew)
- Government: County government
- Subdivisions: Lower-tier municipalities

Counties have fewer responsibilities than regions, as the lower-tier municipalities (cities, towns, villages, townships) within the counties typically provide the majority of municipal services to their residents. The responsibilities of county governments are generally limited to the following: maintenance and construction of rural arterial roads, health and social services, and county land use planning. Counties are only found in Southern Ontario and are also mostly census divisions.

Counties may be as large as regional municipalities in population, but their population density is generally lower (although not as low as in a district.) Counties may include major cities, such as London, Barrie, Kingston and Windsor, geographically located within them, but these communities are usually separated municipalities that are only considered part of the county for census purposes, but are not administratively connected to the county. Municipalities are separated when regional or single-tier status is not appropriate for the municipality's population patterns, but their population is still large enough that it may adversely affect the county's ability to provide services to its smaller communities. Also, these cities have not evolved into large urban agglomerations with other communities, as in regions and single-tier cities, but may have small suburbs such as Point Edward.

Current counties in Ontario:

County	Population (2021)	Area (km^{2})	Density (/km^{2})	County seat	Secondary region	Primary region
Bruce County	73,396	4,076.22	18.0	Walkerton	Southwestern	Southern
Dufferin County	66,257	1,486.77	44.6	Orangeville	Central	Southern
Elgin County	94,752	1,878.57	50.4	St. Thomas	Southwestern	Southern
Essex County	422,860	1,844.21	229.3	Essex	Southwestern	Southern
Frontenac County	161,780	3,725.82	43.4	Kingston	Eastern	Southern
Grey County	100,905	4,497.93	22.4	Owen Sound	Southwestern	Southern
Haliburton County	20,571	4,009.47	5.1	Minden	Central	Southern
Hastings County	145,746	6,013.35	24.2	Belleville	Central	Southern
Huron County	61,366	3,398.28	18.1	Goderich	Southwestern	Southern
Lambton County	128,154	2,999.93	42.7	Wyoming	Southwestern	Southern
Lanark County	75,760	2,986.71	25.4	Perth	Eastern	Southern
United Counties of Leeds and Grenville	104,070	3,355.61	31.0	Brockville	Eastern	Southern
Lennox and Addington County	45,182	2,792.72	16.2	Napanee	Eastern	Southern
Middlesex County	500,563	3,317.76	150.9	London	Southwestern	Southern
Northumberland County	89,365	1,907.40	46.9	Cobourg	Central	Southern
Perth County	81,565	2,218.24	36.8	Stratford	Southwestern	Southern
Peterborough County	147,681	3,779.47	39.1	Peterborough	Central	Southern
United Counties of Prescott and Russell	95,639	2,004.27	47.7	L'Orignal	Eastern	Southern
Renfrew County	106,365	7,357.94	14.5	Pembroke	Eastern	Southern
Simcoe County	533,169	4,818.93	110.6	Midhurst	Central	Southern
United Counties of Stormont, Dundas and Glengarry	114,637	3,308.85	34.6	Cornwall	Eastern	Southern
Wellington County	241,026	2,665.36	90.4	Guelph	Southwestern	Southern

=== Districts ===
Districts of Ontario
- Location: Province of Ontario
- Number: 10
- Populations: 13,935 (Manitoulin) – 146,862 (Thunder Bay)
- Areas: 3,073.54 km^{2} (Manitoulin) – 395,432.07 km^{2} (Kenora)
- Government: None

Districts are regional areas in Northern Ontario that do not serve any municipal government purpose. Although districts do still contain incorporated cities, towns and townships, they do not have an upper-tier level of government, and are largely composed of unorganized areas. Some districts may have District Social Service Administration Boards, which are designed to provide certain social services, but they do not serve a governmental function.

In a district, all services are provided either by the municipalities themselves, by local services boards in some communities within the unorganized areas, or directly by the provincial government. Much of Northern Ontario is sparsely populated, so a county government structure would not be an efficient or cost-effective method of administration.

The former Regional Municipality of Sudbury, created in 1973, was the only division in Northern Ontario ever incorporated with a structure like those of counties, regional municipalities, and single-tier municipalities in the southern part of the province. That division was dissolved in 2000, and now constitutes the single-tier municipality of Greater Sudbury.

The term "district" can also refer to second-level districts of the current City of Toronto that make up the six former municipalities of Metropolitan Toronto when it was amalgamated in 1998: East York, Etobicoke, North York, Scarborough, Old Toronto and York.

Current districts in Ontario:

District	Population (2021)	Area (km^{2})	Density (/km^{2})	District seat	Secondary region	Primary region
Algoma District	113,777	48,281.36	2.4	Sault Ste. Marie	Northeastern	Northern
Cochrane District	77,963	139,784.03	0.6	Cochrane	Northeastern	Northern
Kenora District	66,000	395,432.07	0.2	Kenora	Northwestern	Northern
Manitoulin District	13,935	3,073.54	4.5	Gore Bay	Northeastern	Northern
Nipissing District	84,716	16,986.20	5.0	North Bay	Northeastern	Northern
Parry Sound District	46,909	9,113.92	5.1	Parry Sound	Northeastern / Central	Northern
Rainy River District	19,437	15,400.95	1.3	Fort Frances	Northwestern	Northern
Sudbury District	22,368	39,896.79	0.6	Espanola	Northeastern	Northern
Thunder Bay District	146,862	102,895.48	1.4	Thunder Bay	Northwestern	Northern
Timiskaming District	31,424	13,247.40	2.4	Haileybury	Northeastern	Northern

== See also ==
- List of municipalities in Ontario
- Subdivisions of Canada
- List of Ontario census divisions by population
- List of communities in Ontario
- Former counties of Ontario
