= Durham North =

Durham North may refer to:

- Durham North (Ontario provincial electoral district)
- Durham North (UK Parliament constituency)
- Durham, North Carolina
- Durham—Northumberland, Ontario
