= Cecil Mercer =

Cecil Mercer may refer to:

- Cecil William Mercer, known by his pen name Dornford Yates, English writer and novelist
- Cecil Mercer (politician), member of the Legislative Assembly of Ontario
