= Ross Stevenson =

Ross Stevenson may refer to:

- Ross Stevenson (radio presenter) (born 1957), Australian radio presenter
- K. Ross Stevenson (born 1942), Canadian politician
