= Kenneth Stevenson =

Kenneth Stevenson may refer to:

- Kenneth Stevenson (bishop) (1949–2011), bishop of Portsmouth in the Church of England
- Kenneth Stevenson (politician) (born 1963 or 1964), British politician
- K. Ross Stevenson, politician in Ontario, Canada
