= Larry O'Connor (politician) =

Canadian Métis politician

Mayor of Brock, Ontario
- In office 2006–2011
- Succeeded by: Terry Clayton

Ontario MPP
- In office 1990–1995
- Preceded by: Bill Ballinger
- Succeeded by: Julia Munro
- Constituency: Durham—York

Personal details
- Born: May 4, 1956 (age 70) Oshawa, Ontario, Canada
- Party: New Democratic
- Spouse: Christina
- Children: 1
- Occupation: Auto plant worker

Larry O'Connor (born May 4, 1956) is a politician in Ontario, Canada. He was the mayor of the township of Brock, Ontario from 2006 to 2011. He was also a New Democratic Party member of the Legislative Assembly of Ontario from 1990 to 1995.

== Background ==
O'Connor was born in Oshawa, Ontario. He worked at General Motors plant as an assembly worker. He was a member of the political action committee of the Canadian Auto Workers Local 222 in Oshawa. He is married to Christina with whom he has one son.

== Politics ==
=== Provincial, 1990–1995 ===
O'Connor ran as the New Democratic Party candidate in the 1990 provincial election in the riding of Durham—York. He wasn't nominated until two weeks after the start of the election. During the campaign he said the major issues were lack of approvals for expanding schools and rising property taxes. He defeated Liberal incumbent Bill Ballinger by 1,230 votes. After the election he promised to clean up pollution in Lake Simcoe and Musselman Lake. He was appointed as Parliamentary assistant to the Minister of the Environment, Ruth Grier.

In 1991, he argued against a proposal to create a garbage dump in the Durham region. He suggested that York region was the only viable option. Later in the year, he defended the NDP's legislation called the Waste Management Act saying that it was a reasonable compromise to handle the problem of finding a place for Toronto's garbage.

The NDP were defeated in the 1995 provincial election, having lost much of their support base in the Greater Toronto Area. O'Connor finished second in his re-election bid, with 8,048 votes, almost 17,000 votes behind Progressive Conservative Julia Munro.

He planned to run for the federal New Democratic Party in Oshawa in the 2004 federal election, but lost the NDP nomination to Sid Ryan.

In 2002–03, O'Connor supported Bill Blaikie for the leadership of the federal NDP.

==== Electoral record ====
1990 Ontario general election
Party	Candidate	Votes	%	±%
New Democratic	Larry O'Connor	12,297	34.1	
Liberal	Bill Ballinger	11,067	30.5	
Progressive Conservative	Jack Hauseman	10,904	29.8	
Family Coalition	Jerry Young	2,016	5.6	
Total valid votes		36,790	100.0	
Source: Toronto Star.

=== Durham municipal, 2006-2011 ===
O'Connor was elected as a Durham regional councillor in 1997, later becoming chair of the region's Health and Social Services committee and president of the Association of Public Health Agencies (alPHa) in the Durham region.

O'Connor was first elected mayor of Brock Township in the 2006 municipal elections. He was re-elected in the 2010 municipal elections, but his 13-vote margin of victory over former mayor Terry Clayton led to a recount battle. The township used a mail-in voting system in 2010, and when ballots which were postmarked before election day but arrived late were counted, O'Connor's margin of victory was reduced to just three votes. O'Connor voluntarily resigned as mayor on March 28, 2011, and the township council subsequently appointed Clayton as the new mayor.

=== Federal, 2012 ===
Following the resignation of Bev Oda, the riding of Durham became vacant as of July 31, 2012. On October 23, O'Connor was selected as the federal New Democratic Party candidate in the resulting by-election to be held on November 26.

Canadian federal by-election, November 26, 2012: Durham Resignation of Bev Oda
Party	Candidate	Votes	%	±%	Expenditures
Conservative	Erin O'Toole	17,280	50.72	−3.82	$95,331
New Democratic	Larry O'Connor	8,946	26.26	+5.16	$96,257
Liberal	Grant Humes	5,887	17.28	−0.57	$91,946
Green	Virginia Ervin	1,386	4.07	−1.32	$742
Christian Heritage	Andrew Moriarity	437	1.28	+0.49	$4,379
Online	Michael Nicula	132	0.39	–	$1,080
Total valid votes		34,068	99.66		
Total rejected ballots		115	0.34	-0.12	
Turnout		34,183	35.72	-27.50	
Eligible voters		95,710			
Conservative hold		Swing		−4.49	
Source: Elections Canada
