= Bill Ballinger =

Canadian politician

Ontario MPP
- In office 1987–1990
- Preceded by: Ross Stevenson
- Succeeded by: Larry O'Connor
- Constituency: Durham—York

Personal details
- Born: December 17, 1945 (age 80) Toronto, Ontario
- Party: Liberal
- Occupation: Businessman

William George Ballinger (born December 17, 1945) is a former politician in Ontario, Canada. He was a Liberal member of the Legislative Assembly of Ontario from 1987 to 1990 who represented the GTA riding of Durham—York.

== Background ==
Ballinger was educated at the University of Waterloo and Toronto Teacher's College. He owns and operates Artforms, in Uxbridge, Ont.

== Politics ==
He served as mayor, councillor and regional councillor in Uxbridge, Ontario.

He was elected to the Ontario legislature in the 1987 provincial election, defeating Progressive Conservative incumbent Ross Stevenson by 482 votes. He served as parliamentary assistant to the Minister of Municipal Affairs from 1988 to 1989.

The Liberals were defeated by the Ontario New Democratic Party in the 1990 provincial election, and Ballinger lost his seat to NDP candidate Larry O'Connor by 1,230 votes.

== See also ==
- List of University of Waterloo people
