= William John Bragg =

Canadian politician

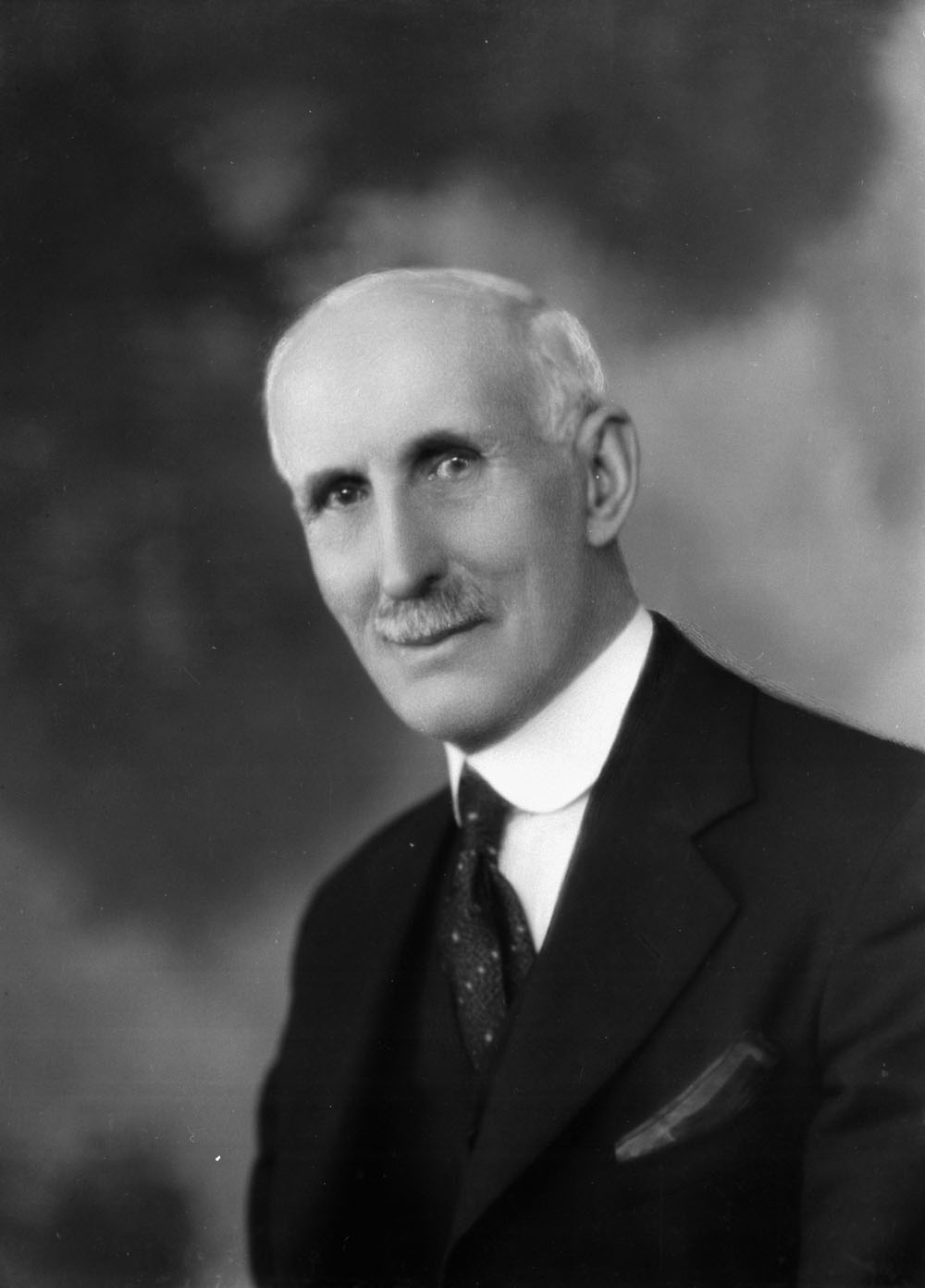
- Bragg, c. 1936

Ontario MPP
- In office 1919–1937
- Preceded by: John Henry Devitt
- Succeeded by: Cecil Mercer
- Constituency: Durham; Durham West, 1919-1926

Personal details
- Born: July 23, 1858 Darlington Township, Canada West
- Died: June 27, 1941 (aged 82) Toronto, Ontario
- Party: Liberal
- Spouse: Sarah Somers (m. 1884)
- Occupation: Farmer

William John Bragg (July 23, 1858 – June 27, 1941) was an Ontario farmer and political figure. He represented Durham in the Legislative Assembly of Ontario from 1919 to 1937 as a Liberal member.

== Biography ==
He was born in Darlington Township, Canada West, the son of Richard Bragg. In 1884, he married Sarah Somers. Bragg was a director of the Farmer's Dairy of Toronto and of a silver mine. He was manager for the Bowmanville Fruit Growers Association.

He died after he was struck and run over by a horse-drawn milk wagon in Toronto, in 1941.
