= Percy Vivian =

Canadian politician

Reginald Percival Vivian
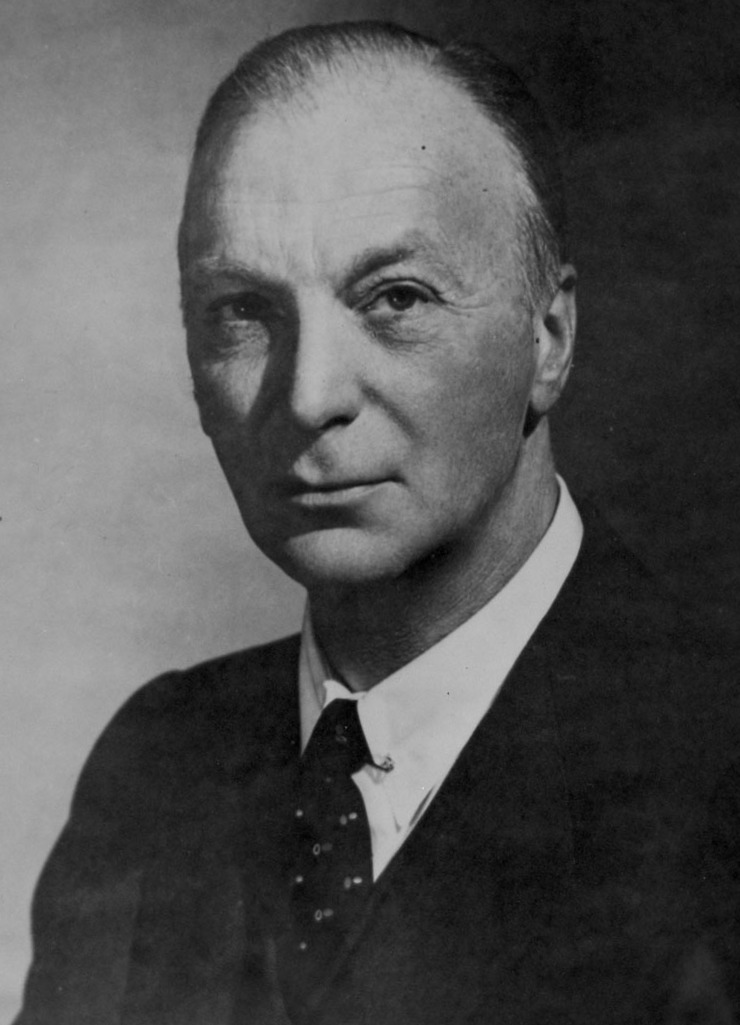
- Vivian, c. 1957

Member of the Legislative Assembly of Ontario for Durham
- In office 4 August 1943 – 27 April 1948
- Preceded by: Cecil Mercer
- Succeeded by: John Weir Foote

Member of Parliament for Durham
- In office June 1957 – June 1962
- Preceded by: John Mason James
- Succeeded by: Russell Honey

Personal details
- Born: 16 October 1902 Barrie, Ontario
- Died: 30 January 1986 (aged 83)
- Party: Progressive Conservative
- Profession: Physician, professor of medicine

Reginald Percival (Percy) Vivian (16 October 1902 – 30 January 1986) was a Canadian politician, physician and professor of medicine. He served as a Progressive Conservative party member of the House of Commons of Canada.

== Background ==
The son of Reginald Percy Vivian and Annie May Brodie, he was born in Barrie, Ontario. He was educated there and at the University of Toronto. In 1926, he married Judith Brewin.

== Politics ==
Vivian was elected as a member of the Legislative Assembly of Ontario in 1943 for the Ontario Progressive Conservative party. From 1943 to 1946, he was Minister of Health and Public Welfare under Premier George A. Drew and remained a member of provincial Parliament until 1948, although he was chief of McGill University's Department of Health and Social Medicine in early 1947.

Almost a decade after leaving Ontario politics, Vivian was elected to the House of Commons of Canada at the Durham riding in the 1957 general election. After winning a second term in the 1958 election, Vivian was defeated in the 1962 election by Russell Honey of the Liberal party.

== Electoral record ==
1962 Canadian federal election: Durham
Party	Candidate	Votes	%	±%}
Liberal	Russell Honey	7,971	44.16	+8.63
Progressive Conservative	Percy Vivian	7,704	42.68	-13.28
New Democratic	Eileen Coutts	2,217	12.28	+3.77
Social Credit	Kenneth C. Toms	158	0.88	

1958 Canadian federal election: Durham
Party	Candidate	Votes	%	±%}
Progressive Conservative	Percy Vivian	9,732	55.96	+11.47
Liberal	Russell C. Honey	6,178	35.53	-5.92
Co-operative Commonwealth	Ernest Dent	1,480	8.51	-3.13

1957 Canadian federal election: Durham
Party	Candidate	Votes	%	±%}
Progressive Conservative	Percy Vivian	7,331	44.49	-0.48
Liberal	John Mason James	6,829	41.45	-4.78
Co-operative Commonwealth	Ernest Dent	1,918	11.64	+2.84
Social Credit	Kenneth Toms	399	2.42	

Drew ministry, Province of Ontario (1943–1948)
Cabinet posts (2)
Predecessor	Office	Successor
Harold Kirby	Minister of Health; 1943–1946	Russell Kelley
Farquhar Oliver	Minister of Public Welfare; 1943–1946	Bill Goodfellow
