= Charles Elwood Stephenson =

Canadian politician

Charles Stephenson
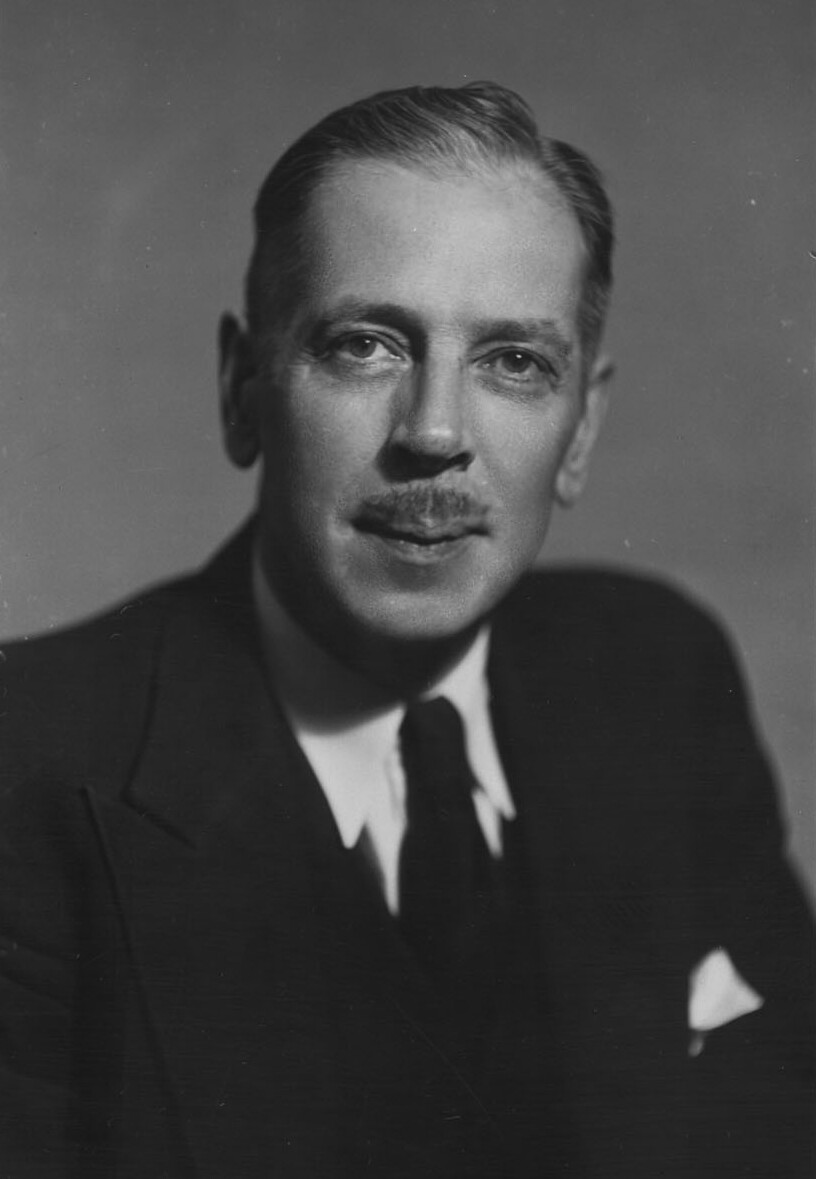
- Stephenson, c. 1940s

Member of Parliament for Durham
- In office June 1945 – June 1949
- Preceded by: Frank Rickard
- Succeeded by: John James

Personal details
- Born: Charles Elwood Stephenson; 11 October 1898 Bowmanville, Canada
- Died: 1 April 1965 (aged 66)
- Party: Progressive Conservative Party of Canada
- Profession: Farmer

Charles Elwood Stephenson AKA C.E.S.(October 11, 1898 - April 1, 1965) was a Canadian politician. He served as mayor of Port Hope, Ontario and as a Progressive Conservative Member of Parliament in the House of Commons of Canada from 1945 to 1949.

Stepenson was a farmer, merchant and store owner. He was elected mayor in 1943 and then ran in the 1945 federal election in Durham and was elected. He was narrowly defeated in his bid for re-election in 1949 and again in 1953.

== Electoral record ==
1953 Canadian federal election: Durham
Party	Candidate	Votes	%	±%}
Liberal	John Mason James	6,684	46.22	-0.44
Progressive Conservative	Charles Elwood Stephenson	6,504	44.98	+1.23
Co-operative Commonwealth	Merdith Roy Armstrong	1,273	8.80	-0.78

1949 Canadian federal election: Durham
Party	Candidate	Votes	%	±%}
Liberal	John Mason James	6,907	46.66	+1.89
Progressive Conservative	Charles Elwood Stephenson	6,476	43.75	-4.57
Co-operative Commonwealth	James David Kenny	1,419	9.59	+2.68

1945 Canadian federal election: Durham
Party	Candidate	Votes	%	±%}
Progressive Conservative	Charles Elwood Stephenson	6,479	48.32	+3.69
Liberal	W. Frank Rickard	6,003	44.77	-10.60
Co-operative Commonwealth	Wilfrd George Bowles	926	6.91	
