= Frank Rickard =

Canadian politician

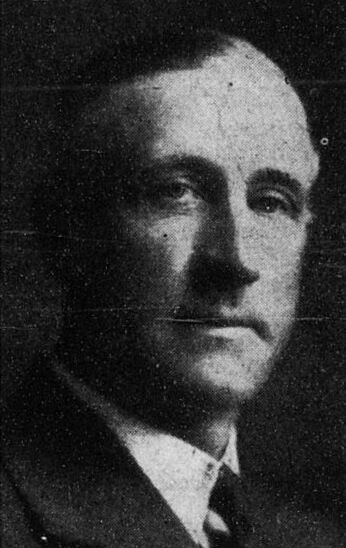
- Rickard, c. 1940

Member of Parliament for Durham
- In office October 1935 – June 1945
- Preceded by: Fred Wellington Bowen
- Succeeded by: Charles Elwood Stephenson

Personal details
- Born: Wilbert Franklin Rickard; 7 January 1884 Clarke Township, Ontario, Canada
- Died: 19 January 1975 (aged 91)
- Party: Liberal
- Spouse(s): Staples m. 13 September 1911; Clara E. Moffat m. 9 September 1936
- Profession: Farmer

Wilbert Franklin Rickard (7 January 1884 – 19 January 1975) was a Liberal party member of the House of Commons of Canada. He was born in Clarke Township, Ontario and became a farmer by career.

Rickard attended public and secondary schools at Newcastle. He served as a regional reeve for Clarke Township, Ontario and in 1933 was warden for Northumberland and Dufferin.

He was first elected to Parliament at the Durham riding in the 1935 general election and re-elected there in 1940. Rickard was defeated by Charles Elwood Stephenson of the Progressive Conservative party in the 1945 election.

== Electoral record ==
1945 Canadian federal election: Durham
Party	Candidate	Votes	%	±%}
Progressive Conservative	Charles Elwood Stephenson	6,479	48.32	+3.69
Liberal	W. Frank Rickard	6,003	44.77	-10.60
Co-operative Commonwealth	Wilfrd George Bowles	926	6.91	

1940 Canadian federal election: Durham
Party	Candidate	Votes	%	±%}
Liberal	Wilbert Franklin Rickard	6,743	55.37	+7.37
National Government	William Ross Strike	5,435	44.63	+0.05

1935 Canadian federal election: Durham
Party	Candidate	Votes	%	±%}
Liberal	Wilbert Frank Rickard	6,649	48.00	+4.66
Conservative	Fred Wellington Bowen	6,176	44.58	-12.08
Reconstruction	R. Rufus Choate Macknight	531	3.83	
Co-operative Commonwealth	Ralph Sharpe Staples	497	3.59	
