= Bill Newman (politician) =

Canadian politician

Ontario MPP
- In office 1977–1981
- Preceded by: New riding
- Succeeded by: Ross Stevenson
- Constituency: Durham—York
- In office 1975–1977
- Preceded by: New riding
- Succeeded by: Riding abolished
- Constituency: Durham North
- In office 1967–1975
- Preceded by: New riding
- Succeeded by: Riding abolished
- Constituency: Ontario South

Personal details
- Born: 1928 Toronto, Ontario
- Died: October 12, 1988 (aged 60) Ajax, Ontario
- Party: Progressive Conservative
- Spouse: Molly Mitchell
- Children: 3
- Occupation: Farmer

William Gould Newman (1928 – October 12, 1988) was a politician from Ontario, Canada. He was a Progressive Conservative member of the Legislative Assembly of Ontario from 1967 to 1981. He served as a cabinet minister in the government of Bill Davis.

== Background ==
Born in Toronto, Ontario, the son of Harry and Margaret Newman, Newman received his degree from the Ontario Agricultural College in Guelph. He worked as a farmer in the Pickering area. He was married to Molly Mitchell with whom he had three children.

== Politics ==
Newman started as a councillor for Pickering Township and eventually became reeve of Ontario County.

In 1967, he ran as the Progressive Conservative candidate in the new riding of Ontario South. He defeated New Democrat candidate Tom Edwards by 1,240 votes. He was re-elected in 1971. In 1975 he was re-elected in the redistributed riding of Durham North and in 1977 he was re-elected in the riding of Durham—York.

In February 1974 he was appointed as Minister of Environment. During his time as Environment Minister he was criticized for failing to ban non-returnable bottles and for refusing to place restrictions on the use of snowmobiles. In October 1975, he was appointed as Minister of Agriculture and Food. In this capacity Newman was responsible for the creation of the Foodland Ontario program, which continues to today, designed to promote the sale of Ontario-grown agricultural products.

He resigned from Cabinet in 1979 due to high blood pressure and did not run in 1981.

=== Cabinet positions ===
Davis ministry, Province of Ontario (1971–1985)
Cabinet posts (2)
Predecessor	Office	Successor
Bill Stewart	Minister of Agriculture and Food; 1975–1979	Lorne Henderson
James Auld	Minister of Environment; 1974–1975	George Kerr

== Later life ==
In 1981, he was appointed to the board of the LCBO. He was also a member of a committee appointed to study the best use of the Pickering Airport lands. A supporter of a wide range of community groups, Newman had a particularly strong association with the Ajax-Pickering Hospital and St. Paul's Church-On-The-Hill, Dunbarton.

Newman died October 12, 1988, at Ajax-Pickering Hospital following an illness of almost two years. He was 60.
