= Allan Lawrence (politician) =

Canadian politician

The Honourable Allan Lawrence PC QC
- Lawrence, c. 1969

Member of Parliament for Durham—Northumberland Northumberland—Durham (1972-1979)
- In office 1972–1988
- Preceded by: Russell Honey
- Succeeded by: K. Ross Stevenson

Ontario MPP
- In office 1958–1972
- Preceded by: Dana Porter
- Succeeded by: Margaret Campbell
- Constituency: St. George

Personal details
- Born: Allan Frederick Lawrence; November 8, 1925 Toronto, Ontario, Canada
- Died: September 6, 2008 (aged 82) Toronto, Ontario, Canada
- Party: Progressive Conservative
- Profession: Lawyer

Allan Frederick Lawrence, PC QC (November 8, 1925 – September 6, 2008) was a Canadian politician and served as both a provincial and federal cabinet minister.

== Provincial politics ==
After practicing as a lawyer, Lawrence became a member of the Legislative Assembly of Ontario. His membership started when he won a 1958 provincial by-election in the downtown Toronto riding of St. George for the Progressive Conservative Party of Ontario. In 1968, Premier John Robarts brought him into cabinet as Minister of Mines.

He ran to succeed Robarts as party leader at the 1971 leadership convention. Lawrence lost to Bill Davis by 44 votes on the fourth ballot. Davis reunited the party by inviting many of Lawrence's key workers, including Hugh Segal and Norman K. Atkins, onto his team to create the Big Blue Machine that helped the party remain in power for a further 14 years.

Davis appointed Lawrence as his Attorney-General in 1971. In 1972, Lawrence resigned his seat in the Ontario legislature to enter federal politics.

=== Cabinet positions ===
Davis ministry, Province of Ontario (1971–1985)
Cabinet posts (2)
Predecessor	Office	Successor
New position	Provincial Secretary for Justice; 1972 (January–September)	George Kerr
Arthur Wishart	Attorney General; 1971–1972; Also Minister of Justice	Dalton Bales
Robarts ministry, Province of Ontario (1961–1971)
Cabinet post (1)
Predecessor	Office	Successor
George Wardrope	Minister of Mines and Northern Affairs; 1968–1971; Titled as Minister of Mines from 1968 to 1970.	Rene Brunelle

== Federal politics ==
Lawrence was elected to the House of Commons of Canada in the 1972 federal election as the Progressive Conservative Member of Parliament (MP) for the rural Ontario riding of Northumberland—Durham. He served as an MP throughout the decade.

When the party won the 1979 federal election, Prime Minister Joe Clark appointed Lawrence to the Cabinet as Minister of Consumer and Corporate Affairs and Solicitor-General. The Clark government fell in a motion of no confidence after several months and was defeated in the 1980 election. Lawrence was re-elected in his riding and returned to the opposition benches.

He ran again in the 1984 election but, despite the Conservative victory that year, was passed over for a cabinet appointment by Brian Mulroney. Lawrence retired from politics at the 1988 election.

== Later life ==
Lawrence retired to the small town of Cobourg, Ontario, with his wife, Moira. He died on September 6, 2008, at Mount Sinai Hospital in Toronto. He was 82 years old.
