= John James (Canadian politician) =

Canadian politician

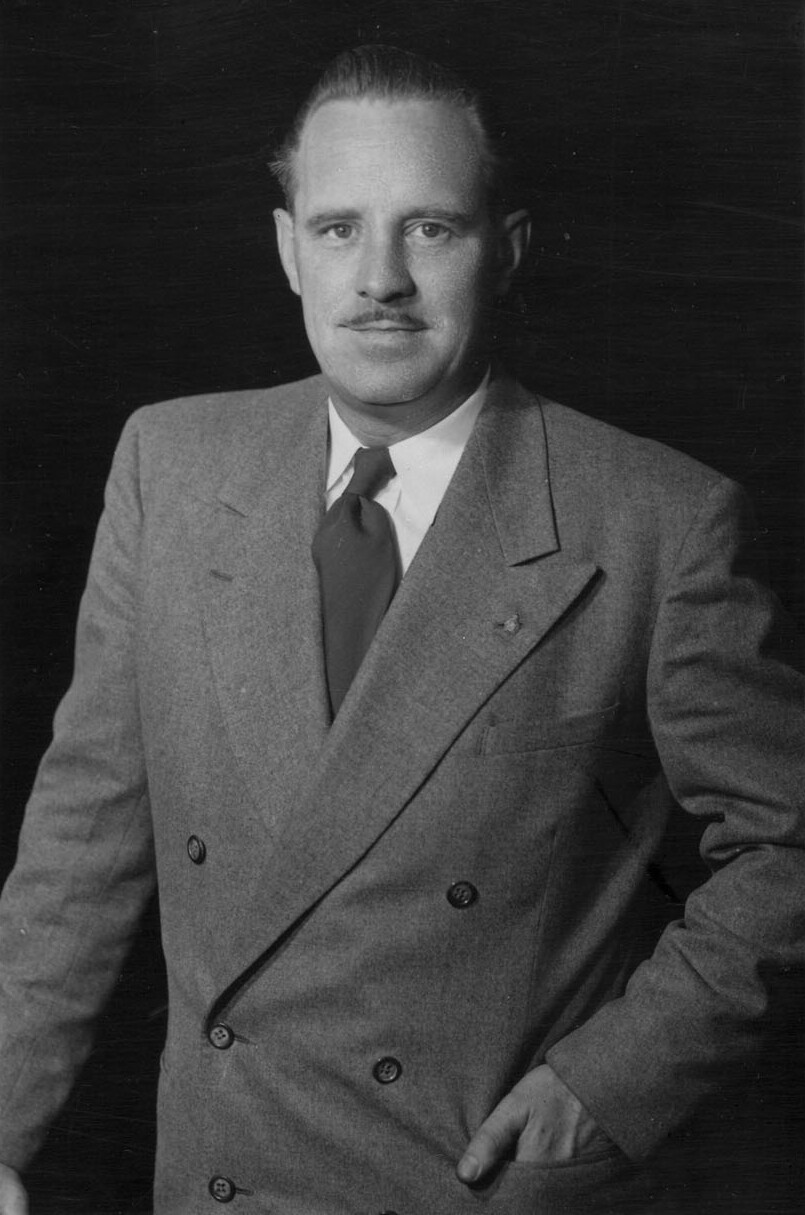
- James, c. 1940s

Member of Parliament for Durham
- In office June 1949 – June 1957
- Preceded by: Charles Elwood Stephenson
- Succeeded by: Percy Vivian

Personal details
- Born: John Mason James; 17 January 1911 Bowmanville, Canada
- Died: 18 October 1999 (aged 88) Bowmanville, Canada
- Party: Liberal
- Profession: newspaper publisher

John Mason James (17 January 1911 – 18 October 1999) was a Liberal party member of the House of Commons of Canada. Born in Bowmanville, Ontario, he was a publisher of the Canadian Statesman newspaper by career. Before entering politics, he was a Captain of Military Intelligence during WW2 between the years of 1940–1945.

John M. James Public School in Bowmanville, Ontario was named in his honour.

He was first elected at the Durham riding in the 1949 general election and re-elected there in the 1953 election. James was defeated in the 1957 election by Percy Vivian of the Progressive Conservative party.

1957 Canadian federal election: Durham
Party	Candidate	Votes	%	±%}
Progressive Conservative	Percy Vivian	7,331	44.49	-0.48
Liberal	John Mason James	6,829	41.45	-4.78
Co-operative Commonwealth	Ernest Dent	1,918	11.64	+2.84
Social Credit	Kenneth Toms	399	2.42	

1953 Canadian federal election: Durham
Party	Candidate	Votes	%	±%}
Liberal	John Mason James	6,684	46.22	-0.44
Progressive Conservative	Charles Elwood Stephenson	6,504	44.98	+1.23
Co-operative Commonwealth	Merdith Roy Armstrong	1,273	8.80	-0.78

1949 Canadian federal election: Durham
Party	Candidate	Votes	%	±%}
Liberal	John Mason James	6,907	46.66	+1.89
Progressive Conservative	Charles Elwood Stephenson	6,476	43.75	-4.57
Co-operative Commonwealth	James David Kenny	1,419	9.59	+2.68
