= Durham—York =

Former provincial electoral district in Ontario, Canada

Coordinates: 44.240°N 79.195°W

Durham—York was a provincial electoral district in northern Durham Region and York Region in Ontario, Canada, that elected members to the Legislative Assembly of Ontario. It contained the towns of East Gwillimbury, Newmarket, Whitchurch–Stouffville, Uxbridge, Georgina, and Brock.

The riding was created in 1975 as Durham North from parts of York North and Ontario, Ontario South and Durham. It was renamed Durham—York in 1977 and existed until 1999 when it was distributed into York North, Pickering—Ajax—Uxbridge and Haliburton—Kawartha Lakes—Brock.

== MPPs ==
1. Bill Newman, Progressive Conservative (1975–1981)
2. Kenneth Ross Stevenson, Progressive Conservative (1981–1987)
3. Bill Ballinger, Liberal (1987–1990)
4. Larry O'Connor, New Democratic (1990–1995)
5. Julia Munro, Progressive Conservative (1995–1999)

== Election results ==
1995 Ontario general election
Party	Candidate	Votes	%	±%
Progressive Conservative	Julia Munro	25,018	60.40	+30.34
New Democratic	Larry O'Connor	8,048	19.43	–14.46
Liberal	David Marquis	7,512	18.13	–12.37
Family Coalition	Vincent Artymko	845	2.04	–3.52
Total valid votes		41,423	99.05	
Total rejected, unmarked and declined ballots		397	0.95	–1.00
Turnout		41,820	63.45	+1.55
Eligible voters		65,909		
Progressive Conservative gain from New Democratic		Swing		+21.36
Source: Elections Ontario

1990 Ontario general election
Party	Candidate	Votes	%	±%
New Democratic	Larry O'Connor	12,297	33.89	+15.92
Liberal	Bill Ballinger	11,067	30.50	–9.56
Progressive Conservative	John (Jack) Hauseman	10,904	30.05	–8.45
Family Coalition	Jerome Young	2,016	5.56	+2.09
Total valid votes		36,284	98.05	
Total rejected, unmarked and declined ballots		721	1.95	+1.43
Turnout		37,005	61.90	+3.28
Eligible voters		59,784		
New Democratic gain from Liberal		Swing		+12.18
Source: Elections Ontario

1987 Ontario general election
Party	Candidate	Votes	%	±%
Liberal	Bill Ballinger	12,369	40.06	+7.02
Progressive Conservative	K. Ross Stevenson	11,887	38.50	–10.05
New Democratic	Donna Kelly	5,549	17.97	–0.44
Family Coalition	Ken Canning	1,070	3.47	–
Total valid votes		30,875	99.48	
Total rejected ballots		161	0.52	+0.07
Turnout		31,036	58.62	–0.16
Eligible voters		52,948		
Liberal gain from Progressive Conservative		Swing		+8.54
Source: Elections Ontario

1985 Ontario general election
Party	Candidate	Votes	%	±%
Progressive Conservative	K. Ross Stevenson	14,343	48.55	–8.96
Liberal	Donald (Don) Hadden	9,760	33.04	+7.77
New Democratic	Margaret Wilbur	5,440	18.41	+1.19
Total valid votes		29,543	99.55	
Total rejected ballots		134	0.45	+0.16
Turnout		29,677	58.78	+1.90
Eligible voters		50,490		
Progressive Conservative hold		Swing		–8.36
Source: Elections Ontario

1981 Ontario general election
Party	Candidate	Votes	%	±%
Progressive Conservative	K. Ross Stevenson	14,404	57.51	+6.07
Liberal	Gary Adamson	6,330	25.27	+2.18
New Democratic	Margaret Wilbur	4,314	17.22	–8.25
Total valid votes		25,048	99.71	
Total rejected ballots		74	0.29	+0.03
Turnout		25,122	56.88	–9.21
Eligible voters		44,170		
Progressive Conservative hold		Swing		+1.94
Source: Elections Ontario

1977 Ontario general election
Party	Candidate	Votes	%	±%
Progressive Conservative	Bill Newman	14,134	51.44	+12.16
New Democratic	Allan Gordon McPhail	7,000	25.47	+3.64
Liberal	Elizabeth (Liz) Catty	6,345	23.09	–15.80
Total valid votes		27,479	99.74	
Total rejected ballots		73	0.27	–
Turnout		27,552	66.08	–
Eligible voters		41,693		
Progressive Conservative hold		Swing		+4.26
Source: Elections Ontario

=== Durham North: 1975 ===
1975 Ontario general election: Durham North
Party	Candidate	Votes	%
Progressive Conservative	Bill Newman	11,206	39.28
Liberal	Clare W. Morrison	11,095	38.89
New Democratic	Lesley Griffin	6,230	21.84
Total valid votes		28,531	99.64
Total rejected ballots		103	0.36
Turnout		28,634	74.04
Eligible voters		38,674	
Liberal pickup new district.			
Source: Elections Ontario

== See also ==
- List of Ontario provincial electoral districts
- Canadian provincial electoral districts
