= Russell Honey =

Canadian politician

Russell Clayton Honey
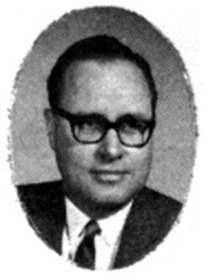
- Honey, c.1968

Member of Parliament for Durham
- In office June 1962 – June 1968
- Preceded by: Percy Vivian
- Succeeded by: riding dissolved

Member of Parliament for Northumberland—Durham
- In office June 1968 – September 1972
- Preceded by: first member
- Succeeded by: Allan Lawrence

Personal details
- Born: 28 August 1921 Riverhurst, Saskatchewan, Canada
- Died: 7 January 2007 (aged 85) Belleville, Ontario, Canada
- Party: Liberal
- Spouse(s): Anne Valeria Romano (m. 25 June 1946) Marrie Lajoie (m.1973-2007)
- Profession: lawyer, judge

Russell Clayton Honey (28 August 1921 – 7 January 2007) was a Liberal member of the House of Commons of Canada. He was born in Riverhurst, Saskatchewan and became a lawyer by career after studies at Osgoode Hall Law School.

Russell served in the Royal Canadian Air Force from 1940 to 1944 and was released at the request of Trans-Canada Airlines to assist establishing the first trans-Atlantic passenger service.

In 1946 he entered Osgoode Hall Law School, graduating in 1949. He was the senior partner in the firm Honey, Brooks, Harrison in Port Hope, Ontario and was appointed a Queen's Counsel in 1965.

After an initial unsuccessful attempt to win the Durham riding in the 1958 federal election, he won that seat in the 1962 election. Honey was re-elected there in 1963 and 1965 and he served as Chairman of the Commons Standing Committee on Agriculture in those years. In 1965 Prime Minister Lester Peasrson appointed him Chairman of the National Liberal Caucus.

The Durham riding changed in the late 1960s to Northumberland—Durham where Honey won re-election in the 1968 election. In 1968 he was Chairman of the Ontario-Trudeau Committee, a group that played a role in the election of Pierre Elliot Trudeau as leader of the Liberal Party and Prime Minister of Canada. In the early years of Trudeau's administration he was Parliamentary Secretary to the Right Honourable Jean Chrétien (1969–1970). In 1970 Honey was elected Deputy Speaker of the House of Commons, a position he held until 1972. Following his defeat in the 1972 election, he was appointed a judge in Belleville, Ontario, where he served as a judge of the county court from 1973 to 1989 and a judge of the Ontario Superior Court from 1990 to 1991 when he retired.

In his retirement, Russell Honey researched and wrote and published a history of the Johnston family entitled, The Gentle Johnstons. He died in 2007.

== Electoral record ==
1965 Canadian federal election: Durham
Party	Candidate	Votes	%	±%}
Liberal	Russell Honey	8,017	42.49	-3.73
Progressive Conservative	Garnet Rickard	6,725	35.64	-7.21
New Democratic	John Anthony Cheyne Ketchum	3,948	20.93	+10.85
Social Credit	Wilbur N. Grandall	177	0.94	+0.08
Liberal hold		Swing		+1.74

1963 Canadian federal election: Durham
Party	Candidate	Votes	%	±%}
Liberal	Russell Honey	8,720	46.22	+2.06
Progressive Conservative	Garnet Rickard	8,084	42.85	+0.17
New Democratic	Eileen Ethel Coutts	1,901	10.08	-2.21
Social Credit	Wilbur N. Crandall	161	0.85	-0.02

1962 Canadian federal election: Durham
Party	Candidate	Votes	%	±%}
Liberal	Russell Honey	7,971	44.16	+8.63
Progressive Conservative	Percy Vivian	7,704	42.68	-13.28
New Democratic	Eileen Coutts	2,217	12.28	+3.77
Social Credit	Kenneth C. Toms	158	0.88	
