= Alex Shepherd =

Canadian politician

Member of Parliament for Durham
- In office 1993–2004
- Preceded by: K. Ross Stevenson
- Succeeded by: Bev Oda

Personal details
- Born: Alexander James Shepherd; October 13, 1946 (age 79) Toronto, Ontario, canada
- Party: Liberal
- Occupation: Accountant

Alexander James Shepherd (born October 13, 1946) was a Canadian member of the House of Commons of Canada from 1993 to 2004.

Shepherd was a Chartered Accountant based in Port Perry, Ontario, when he became the Liberal party candidate for Durham electoral district in the 1993 general election. He won the riding and was re-elected there in the 1997 and 2000 general elections, serving in the 35th, 36th and 37th Canadian Parliaments respectively. He was Parliamentary Secretary to the Minister of Revenue, on the Finance Committee, Chair of Economics Committee for the Liberal Party, on GTA Caucus, Rural Caucus, Ontario Caucus.

Shepherd did not campaign again for the Durham riding and therefore left federal politics in 2004.

He is married to Carol Shepherd (née Bishop) since 1969. They have three children, Mark, Andrew, and Jill.
