= John Weir Foote =

Canadian politician and military chaplain

John Foote VC CD
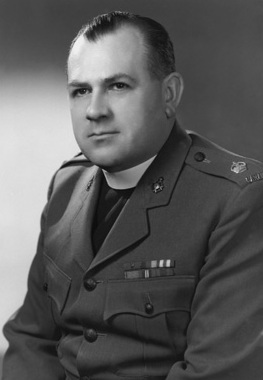

Ontario MPP
- In office 1948–1959
- Preceded by: Percy Vivian
- Succeeded by: Hugh Carruthers
- Constituency: Durham

Personal details
- Born: May 5, 1904 Madoc, Ontario
- Died: May 2, 1988 (aged 83) Cobourg, Ontario
- Party: Progressive Conservative

Military service
- Allegiance: Canada
- Branch/service: Canadian Army
- Years of service: 1939–1948
- Rank: Lieutenant colonel
- Unit: The Royal Hamilton Light Infantry (Wentworth Regiment); Royal Canadian Army Chaplain Corps
- Battles/wars: Dieppe Raid
- Awards: Victoria Cross

John Weir Foote, VC CD (May 5, 1904 – May 2, 1988) was a Canadian military chaplain and politician. He received the Victoria Cross for his actions during the Dieppe Raid in 1942. Foote is the only Canadian chaplain to be awarded the Victoria Cross. After the war he was elected to the Legislative Assembly of Ontario and served as a Progressive Conservative member from 1948 to 1959. He represented the riding of Durham. He served as a cabinet minister in the government of Leslie Frost.

== Early life ==
Foote was born in Madoc in eastern Ontario on May 5, 1904. He was educated at the University of Western Ontario in London, Ontario, at Queen's University in Kingston, Ontario and at Presbyterian College and McGill University in Montreal, Quebec. He entered the Presbyterian ministry in 1934, serving congregations in Fort-Coulonge, Quebec, and Port Hope, Ontario.

In 1934 it is recorded that Rev. John Weir Foote joined the Loyal Orange Institution, being initiated into Fraserville Loyal Orange Lodge No. 46, Ontario, a lodge under the Grand Orange Lodge of Canada.

In December 1939, after the outbreak of the Second World War, he enlisted in the Canadian Army. He was posted to The Royal Hamilton Light Infantry (Wentworth Regiment) (RHLI) as the Regimental Chaplain with the rank of Honorary Captain.

== Victoria Cross ==
Foote was 38 years old and serving as the padre of the RHLI, when he performed the following deed during the Dieppe Raid for which he was awarded the Victoria Cross:

On August 19, 1942 at Dieppe, France, Honorary Captain Foote during the eight hours of the battle assisted the Regimental Medical Officer and frequently left shelter to administer Morphine, first-aid and to collect the wounded and carry them to safety. His actions saved many lives. Later he carried those injured to the landing craft that was to take them to safety. Padre Foote deliberately stayed behind walked into the German position in order to be taken prisoner so that he could be of help to those men who would be in captivity until May 5, 1945.

His VC award was gazetted after the Second World War on February 14, 1946, the citation read:

DEPARTMENT OF NATIONAL DEFENCE, OTTAWA.

14th February, 1946.

THE CANADIAN ARMY.

The KING has been graciously pleased to approve the award of the VICTORIA CROSS to: —

Honorary Captain John Weir FOOTE, Canadian Chaplain Services.

At Dieppe, on 19th August, 1942, Honorary Captain Foote, Canadian Chaplain Services, was Regimental Chaplain with the Royal Hamilton Light Infantry.

Upon landing on the beach under heavy fire he attached himself to the Regimental Aid Post which had been set up in a slight depression on the beach, but which was only sufficient to give cover to men lying down. During the subsequent period of approximately eight hours, while the action continued, this officer not only assisted the Regimental Medical Officer in ministering to the wounded in the Regimental Aid Post, but time and again left this shelter to inject morphine, give first-aid and carry wounded personnel from the open beach to the Regimental Aid Post. On these occasions, with utter disregard for his personal safety, Honorary Captain Foote exposed himself to an inferno of fire and saved many lives by his gallant efforts. During the action, as the tide went out, the Regimental Aid Post was moved to the shelter of a stranded landing craft. Honorary Captain Foote continued tirelessly and courageously to carry wounded men from the exposed beach to the cover of the landing craft. He also removed wounded from inside the landing craft when ammunition had been set on fire by enemy shells. When landing craft appeared he carried wounded from the Regimental Aid Post to the landing craft through very heavy fire.

On several occasions this officer had the opportunity to embark but returned to the beach as his chief concern was the care and evacuation of the wounded. He refused a final opportunity to leave the shore, choosing to suffer the fate of the men he had ministered to for over three years.

Honorary Captain Foote personally saved many lives by his efforts and his example inspired all around him. Those who observed him state that the calmness of this heroic officer, as he walked about, collecting the wounded on the fire-swept beach will never be forgotten.

He later achieved the rank of Major and he remained with the Royal Canadian Army Chaplain Corps at Camp Borden until being demobilized in 1948.

== Politics ==
He won a seat in the Legislative Assembly of Ontario in the 1948 provincial election and served as the Progressive Conservative Member of Provincial Parliament (MPP) for Durham. He was first appointed to serve as Deputy Commissioner for the Liquor Control Board of Ontario, then into the cabinet after the 1951 election as Ontario Minister of Reform Institutions, but stepped down in 1957, following a number of heart attacks. He retired from the provincial legislature in 1959.

=== Cabinet positions ===
Frost ministry, Province of Ontario (1949–1961)
Cabinet post (1)
Predecessor	Office	Successor
William Hamilton	Minister of Reform Institutions; 1950–1957	Matthew Dymond

== Later life ==
Foote returned to the RHLI in 1964, serving as Honorary Lieutenant-Colonel until 1973.

He made his home with his wife, the former Edith Sheridan (1898–1986), in Cobourg, Ontario, until his death on May 2, 1988. He is buried in Union Cemetery, Cobourg.

== Legacy ==
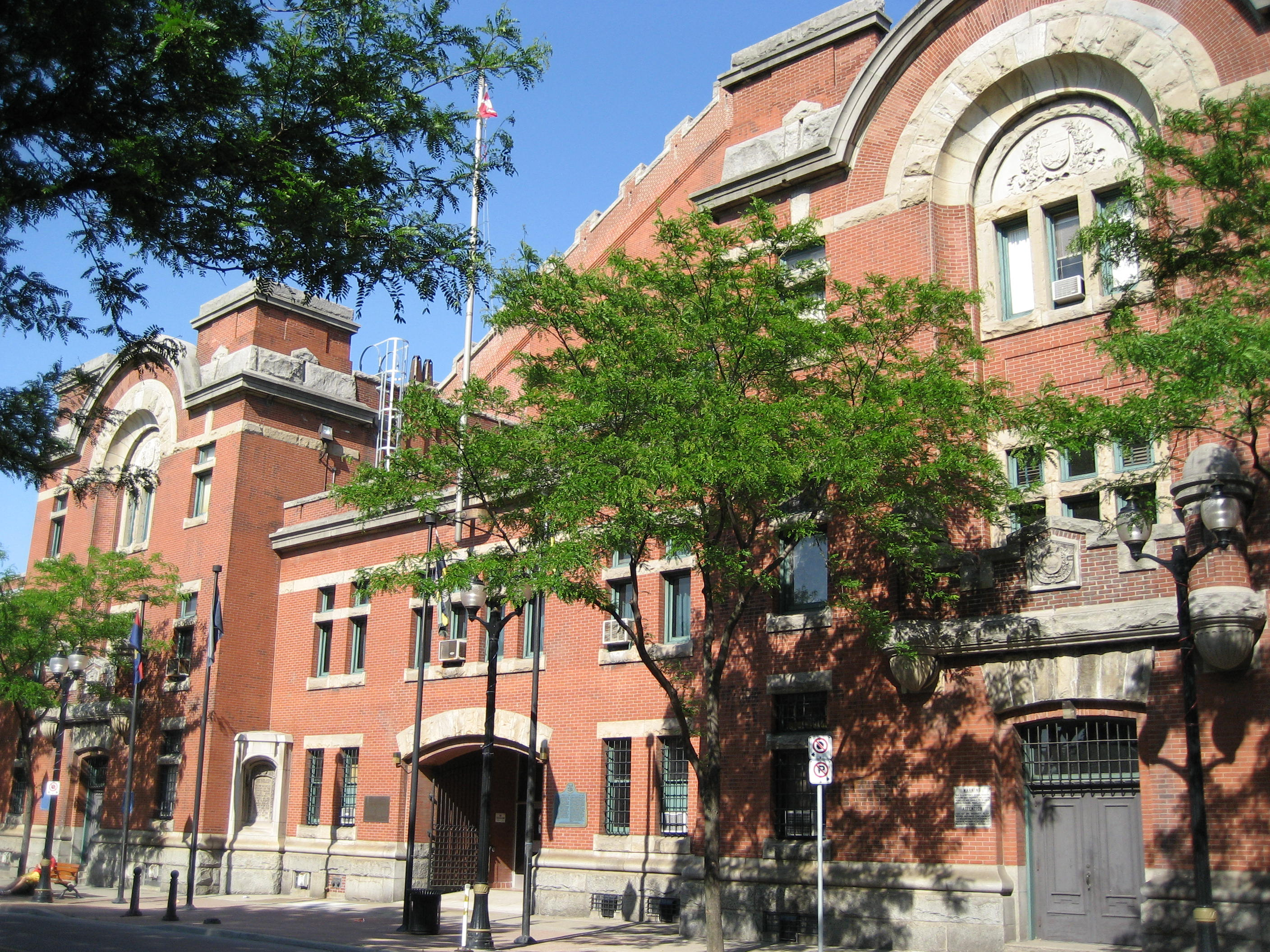
John Weir Foote V.C. Armouries, James Street North, Hamilton, Ontario

The Royal Canadian Legion branch in Grafton, Ontario was renamed the Lt. Col. John W Foote V.C. C.D Branch 580 in 1982.

The James Street Armoury in Hamilton, Ontario, where the RHLI is now based, along with The Argyll & Sutherland Highlanders of Canada (Princess Louise's) and 11 Field Regiment, Royal Canadian Artillery, was renamed the John W. Foote VC Armoury in his memory. Prior to his death, John Foote donated his medals to the Royal Hamilton Light Infantry where they are held at the RHLI Heritage Museum at the John W Foote VC Armoury. The Armoury is a Classified Federal Heritage Building 1986 on the Register of the Government of Canada Heritage Buildings.

== Honours ==

Ribbon	Description	Notes
	Victoria Cross (VC)	14 February 1946
	1939–1945 Star	
	France and Germany Star	
	Defence Medal	
	Canadian Volunteer Service Medal	With Overseas Clasp With Dieppe Clasp
	War Medal	
	Queen Elizabeth II Coronation Medal: 2 June 1953	
	Canadian Centennial Medal: 1 July 1967	
	Queen Elizabeth II Silver Jubilee Medal: 6 February 1977; Both Canadian and British Versions of the Medal	
	Canadian Forces' Decoration (CD)	

== See also ==
- Monuments to Courage (David Harvey, 1999)
- The Register of the Victoria Cross (This England, 1997)
