= Northumberland—Durham =

Former federal electoral district in Ontario, Canada

Ontario electoral district

Defunct federal electoral district
- Legislature: House of Commons
- District created: 1966
- District abolished: 1976
- First contested: 1968
- Last contested: 1974

Northumberland—Durham was a federal electoral district represented in the House of Commons of Canada from 1968 to 1979. It was located in the province of Ontario. This riding was created in 1966 from parts of Durham and Northumberland and a small part of Hastings—Frontenac ridings.

It consisted of the County of Durham, the Townships of Alnwick, Haldimand, Hamilton, South Monaghan and Percy in the County of Northumberland, the Town of Cobourg and the Village of Hastings.

The electoral district was abolished in 1976 when it became part of Durham—Northumberland, Northumberland and Peterborough ridings.

== Members of Parliament ==
This riding has elected the following members of Parliament:

Parliament	Years	Member	Party
Riding created from Northumberland, Durham and Hastings—Frontenac
28th	1968–1972	Russell Honey	Liberal
29th	1972–1974	Allan Lawrence	Progressive Conservative
30th	1974–1979	Allan Lawrence	Progressive Conservative
Riding dissolved into Durham—Northumberland, Northumberland and Peterborough

== Election results ==
1968 Canadian federal election
Party	Candidate	Votes	%
Liberal	Russell Honey	13,707	44.58
Progressive Conservative	Robert John Pratt	11,141	36.24
New Democratic	Wilmer J. Hill	5,897	19.18

1972 Canadian federal election
Party	Candidate	Votes	%	±%
Progressive Conservative	Allan Lawrence	17,385	45.18	+8.94
Liberal	Russell Honey	14,594	37.92	-6.66
New Democratic	Wilmer Hill	6,504	16.90	-2.28
Progressive Conservative gain from Liberal		Swing		+7.80

1974 Canadian federal election
Party	Candidate	Votes	%	±%
Progressive Conservative	Allan Lawrence	16,824	43.30	-1.88
Liberal	Allan Becket	14,896	38.34	+0.41
New Democratic	Russ Walker	7,136	18.37	+1.46
Progressive Conservative hold		Swing		-1.15

== See also ==
- List of Canadian electoral districts
- Historical federal electoral districts of Canada
