= Fred Wellington Bowen =

Canadian politician

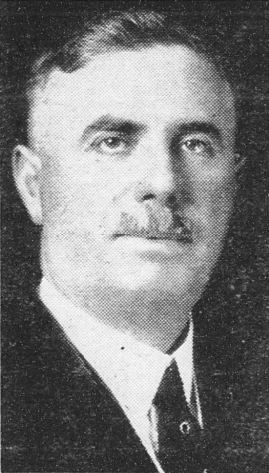
- Bowen, c. 1930

Member of the Canadian Parliament for Durham
- In office 1921–1935
- Preceded by: Newton Rowell
- Succeeded by: Wilbert Franklin Rickard

Personal details
- Born: May 23, 1877 Newcastle, Ontario, Canada
- Died: July 7, 1949 (aged 72)
- Party: Conservative Party
- Occupation: farmer

Fred Wellington Bowen (May 23, 1877 in Newcastle, Ontario, Canada – July 7, 1949) was a Canadian politician and farmer. He was elected to the House of Commons of Canada in 1921 as a Member of the historical Conservative Party to represent the riding of Durham. He was re-elected in the elections of 1925, 1926, 1930 but defeated in 1935. Prior to his federal career, he was reeve and councillor of Clarke Township, Ontario.

== Electoral record ==
1935 Canadian federal election: Durham
Party	Candidate	Votes	%	±%}
Liberal	Wilbert Frank Rickard	6,649	48.00	+4.66
Conservative	Fred Wellington Bowen	6,176	44.58	-12.08
Reconstruction	R. Rufus Choate Macknight	531	3.83	
Co-operative Commonwealth	Ralph Sharpe Staples	497	3.59	

1930 Canadian federal election: Durham
Party	Candidate	Votes	%	±%}
Conservative	Fred Wellington Bowen	6,827	56.67	+0.23
Liberal	Montague John Holman	5,221	43.33	
Source: lop.parl.ca

1926 Canadian federal election: Durham
Party	Candidate	Votes	%	±%}
Conservative	Fred Wellington Bowen	6,508	56.43	+2.82
Liberal–Progressive	Melville Howden Staples	5,024	43.57	

1925 Canadian federal election: Durham
Party	Candidate	Votes	%	±%}
Conservative	Fred Wellington Bowen	7,020	53.61	+12.71
Liberal	Charles Vincent Massey	6,074	46.39	+5.48

1921 Canadian federal election: Durham
Party	Candidate	Votes	%	±%}
Conservative	Fred Wellington Bowen	5,106	40.90	-39.93
Progressive	Thomas Albert Victor Reid	3,936	31.53	
Liberal	William Thomas Roche Preston	3,441	27.57	+8.40
