= Alex Carruthers =

Canadian politician

Alexander Carruthers
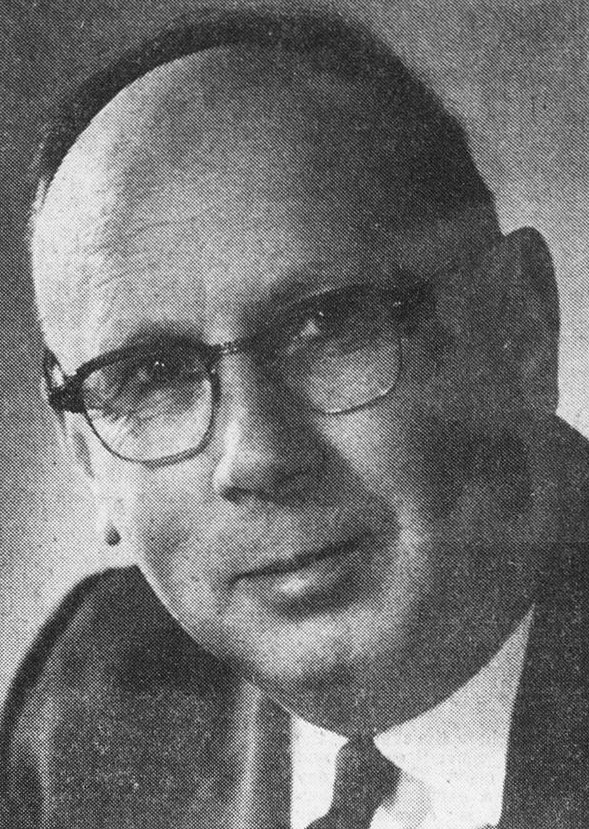
- Carruthers, c. 1963

Ontario MPP
- In office 1959–1975
- Preceded by: John Weir Foote
- Succeeded by: Riding abolished
- Constituency: Durham

Personal details
- Born: December 2, 1906 Lambton County, Ontario
- Died: November 18, 1977 (aged 70) Port Hope, Ontario
- Party: Progressive Conservative
- Occupation: Teacher

Hugh Alexander (Alex) Carruthers (December 2, 1906 – November 18, 1977) was a Canadian politician, who represented Durham in the Legislative Assembly of Ontario from 1959 to 1975 as a Progressive Conservative member.

Alex Carruthers was born in Lambton County to Hugh R. Carruthers and Dyell Amelia Levina. Prior to his election, he worked at CCM bicycles, in Weston, Ontario. He was principal of Hawkins Senior Public School in Port Hope, Ontario.

Carruthers served as the government caucus chief whip during the later part of the John Robarts' premiership and the early part of Bill Davis' premiership, serving before it became common practice to appoint chief whip a minister without portfolio.
