= Durham (federal electoral district) =

Federal electoral district in Ontario, Canada

Coordinates: 44.065°N 78.881°W

Ontario electoral district
- Durham in relation to other Ontario electoral districts (2015 boundaries)

Defunct federal electoral district
- Legislature: House of Commons
- District created: 1903
- District abolished: 2023
- First contested: 1904
- Last contested: 2024 by-election
- District webpage: profile, map

Demographics
- Population (2021): 150,235
- Electors (2015): 92,317
- Area (km²): 953
- Census division: Durham
- Census subdivision(s): Clarington, Mississaugas of Scugog Island, Oshawa, Scugog

Durham (formerly known as Clarington—Scugog—Uxbridge) was a federal electoral district in Ontario, Canada, that was represented in the House of Commons of Canada from 1904 to 1968 and from 1988 to 2025.

Its first iteration was created in 1903 from Durham East and Durham West ridings. It consisted of the county of Durham. The electoral district was abolished in 1966 when it was merged into the Northumberland—Durham riding. It was recreated in 1987 from parts of the Durham—Northumberland and Ontario ridings.

The second incarnation of the riding initially consisted of the Town of Newcastle, the townships of Scugog and Uxbridge, Scugog Indian Reserve No. 34, the part of the City of Oshawa lying north of Rossland Road, the allowance for road in front of lots 1, 2, 3 and 4, Concession 3 and part of the Town of Whitby lying north of Taunton Road.

In 1996, it was redefined to consist of the Township of Scugog, Scugog Indian Reserve No. 34, the Town of Clarington and part of the City of Oshawa lying north of a line drawn from west to east along Taunton Road, south along Ritson Road North, east along Rossland Road East, south along Harmony Road North and east along King Street East.

The electoral district was abolished in 2003 when it was redistributed between Clarington—Scugog—Uxbridge, Oshawa and Whitby—Oshawa ridings. Clarington—Scugog—Uxbridge was defined to consist of the townships of Uxbridge and Scugog, the Municipality of Clarington and the Scugog Island reserve. In 2004, Clarington—Scugog—Uxbridge was renamed to its current name of Durham. Following the Canadian federal electoral redistribution of 2012, the riding lost territory to Pickering—Uxbridge and Northumberland—Peterborough South and gained territory from Oshawa and Whitby—Oshawa.

Following the report from the 2022 electoral redistribution, the riding will be redistributed into Bowmanville—Oshawa North (Clarington and Oshawa portions) and York—Durham (Scugog portion).

On August 24, 2020, then-Durham MP Erin O'Toole won the Conservative Party leadership election and was named Leader of the Official Opposition. In February 2022, following his party's defeat in the 2021 election, he was ousted as Conservative leader. He resigned his seat in the legislature in August 2023, triggering the 2024 Durham by-election, won by fellow Conservative Jamil Jivani.

== Demographics ==
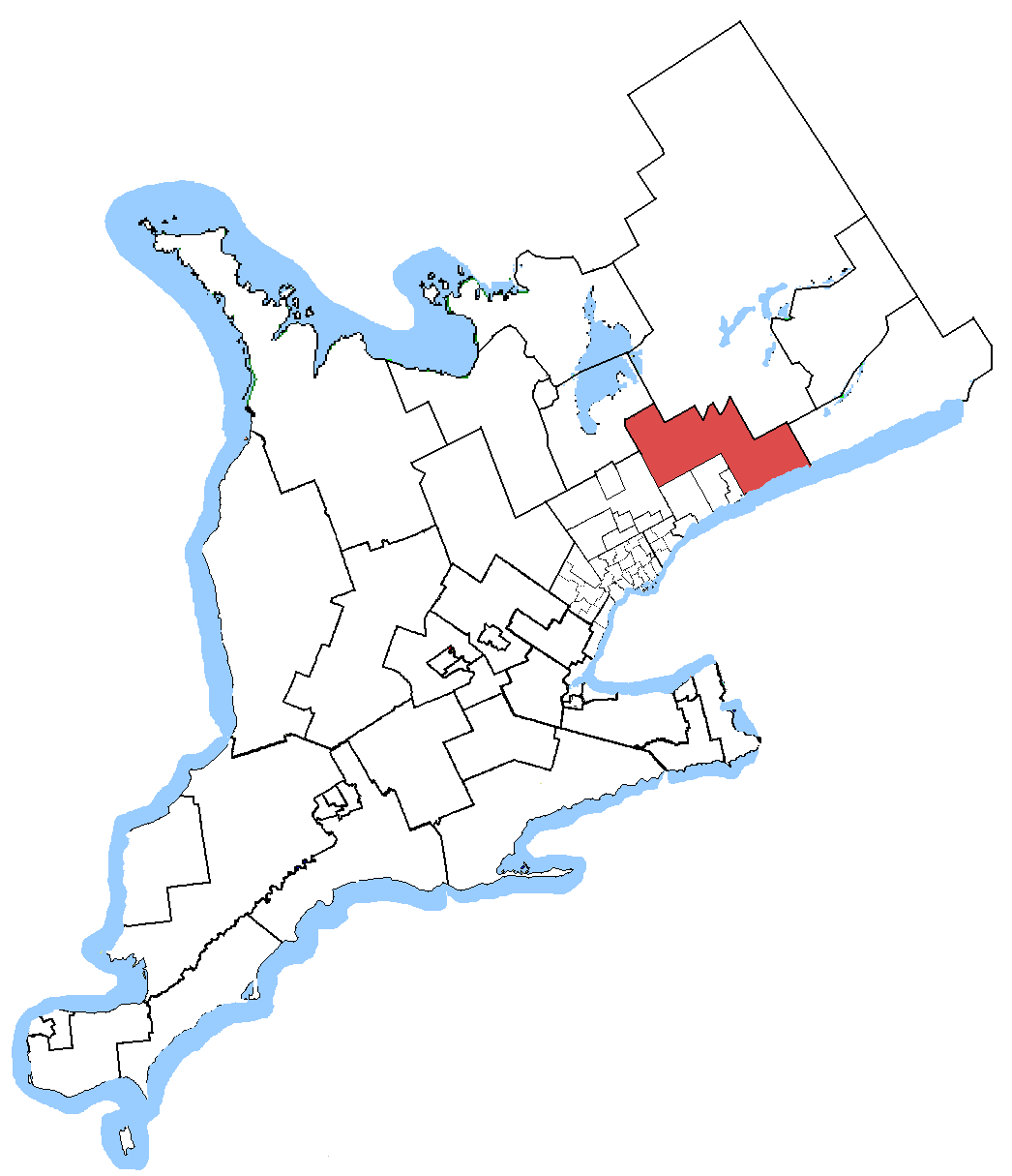
Durham in relation to other Ontario electoral districts (2003 boundaries)

According to the 2021 Canadian census

Languages: 81.8% English, 1.6% Tamil, 1.4% French, 1.4% Urdu
Religions: 52.1% Christian (21.7% Catholic, 7.0% United Church, 4.5% Anglican, 1.9% Pentecostal, 1.4% Baptist, 1.3% Christian Orthodox, 1.2% Presbyterian, 13.1% Other), 5.3% Muslim, 4.1% Hindu, 36.8% None
Median income: $45,600 (2020)

Average income: $57,600 (2020)

Panethnic groups in Durham (2011−2021)
Panethnic group	2021		2016		2011	
Panethnic group	Pop.	%	Pop.	%	Pop.	%
European (Note: Statistic includes all persons that did not make up part of a visible minority or an indigenous identity.)	107,515	72.06%	109,155	84.28%	103,860	90.82%
South Asian	14,105	9.45%	5,055	3.9%	1,640	1.43%
African	10,405	6.97%	5,165	3.99%	2,830	2.47%
Indigenous	3,420	2.29%	3,045	2.35%	2,135	1.87%
East Asian (Note: Statistic includes total responses of "Chinese", "Korean", and "Japanese" under visible minority section on census.)	3,385	2.27%	2,090	1.61%	1,070	0.94%
Southeast Asian (Note: Statistic includes total responses of "Filipino" and "Southeast Asian" under visible minority section on census.)	3,025	2.03%	1,795	1.39%	1,160	1.01%
Middle Eastern (Note: Statistic includes total responses of "West Asian" and "Arab" under visible minority section on census.)	2,875	1.93%	980	0.76%	450	0.39%
Latin American	1,330	0.89%	820	0.63%	565	0.49%
Other/multiracial (Note: Statistic includes total responses of "Visible minority, n.i.e." and "Multiple visible minorities" under visible minority section on census.)	3,125	2.09%	1,425	1.1%	660	0.58%
Total responses	149,195	99.31%	129,520	98.97%	114,360	99.1%
Total population	150,235	100%	130,872	100%	115,395	100%
Notes: Totals greater than 100% due to multiple origin responses. Demographics based on 2012 Canadian federal electoral redistribution riding boundaries.

== Geography ==
The riding is a mix of suburban, exurban areas. It contains all of Scugog, and the Mississaugas of Scugog Island First Nation, plus Oshawa north of Taunton Road and the western half of the Municipality of Clarington, which is home to over half the riding's population. Bowmanville is the riding's largest community. Most of the riding has supported the Conservatives in the 2019 and 2021 elections, with the strongest support coming from the riding's rural areas, especially in rural Scugog Township. The Liberals have been able to win much of the Oshawa part of the riding, outside of the city's rural northern section. The NDP have seen their strongest support in Oshawa and in Bowmanville.

== Members of Parliament ==
This riding has elected the following members of Parliament:

Parliament	Years	Member	Party
Durham; Riding created from Durham East and Durham West
10th	1904–1908	Henry Alfred Ward	Conservative
11th	1908–1911	Charles Jonas Thornton	Conservative
12th	1911–1917	Charles Jonas Thornton	Conservative
13th	1917–1921	Newton Rowell	Government (Unionist)
14th	1921–1925	Fred Wellington Bowen	Conservative
15th	1925–1926	Fred Wellington Bowen	Conservative
16th	1926–1930	Fred Wellington Bowen	Conservative
17th	1930–1935	Fred Wellington Bowen	Conservative
18th	1935–1940	Frank Rickard	Liberal
19th	1940–1945	Frank Rickard	Liberal
20th	1945–1949	Charles Elwood Stephenson	Progressive Conservative
21st	1949–1953	John James	Liberal
22nd	1953–1957	John James	Liberal
23rd	1957–1958	Percy Vivian	Progressive Conservative
24th	1958–1962	Percy Vivian	Progressive Conservative
25th	1962–1963	Russell Honey	Liberal
26th	1963–1965	Russell Honey	Liberal
27th	1965–1968	Russell Honey	Liberal
Riding dissolved into Northumberland—Durham and Ontario
Durham; Riding re-created from Durham—Northumberland, Oshawa and Ontario
34th	1988–1993	K. Ross Stevenson	Progressive Conservative
35th	1993–1997	Alex Shepherd	Liberal
36th	1997–2000	Alex Shepherd	Liberal
37th	2000–2004	Alex Shepherd	Liberal
Clarington—Scugog—Uxbridge
38th	2004–2006	Bev Oda	Conservative
Durham
39th	2006–2008	Bev Oda	Conservative
40th	2008–2011	Bev Oda	Conservative
41st	2011–2012	Bev Oda	Conservative
41st	2012–2015	Erin O'Toole	Conservative
42nd	2015–2019	Erin O'Toole	Conservative
43rd	2019–2021	Erin O'Toole	Conservative
44th	2021–2023	Erin O'Toole	Conservative
44th	2024–2025	Jamil Jivani	Conservative
Riding dissolved into Bowmanville—Oshawa North and York—Durham

=== Current member of Parliament ===
This seat is held by Conservative Jamil Jivani since a 2024 by-election to succeed former Opposition leader Erin O'Toole.

== Election results ==
Graph of election results in Durham (1987-2003), Clarington—Scugog—Uxbridge, Durham (2004-present) (1987-present, minor parties that never got 2% of the vote or didn't run consistently are omitted)

=== Durham, 2004–present ===
Graph of election results in Durham (2004-present, minor parties that never got 2% of the vote or didn't run consistently are omitted)

Canadian federal by-election, March 4, 2024: Durham Resignation of Erin O'Toole
Party	Candidate	Votes	%	±%
Conservative	Jamil Jivani	18,610	57.44	+11.04
Liberal	Robert Rock	7,285	22.48	–7.44
New Democratic	Chris Borgia	3,363	10.38	–7.14
People's	Patricia Conlin	1,435	4.43	–1.07
Green	Kevin MacKenzie	698	2.15	
Independent	Pranay Gunti	374	1.15	
Centrist	Khalid Qureshi	336	1.04	
United	Grant Abraham	238	0.73	
Rhinoceros	Adam Smith	62	0.19	–0.03
Total valid votes		32,401		
Total rejected ballots				
Turnout		32,401	27.87	–33.32
Eligible voters		116,259		
Conservative hold		Swing		+9.24
Source: Elections Canada

2021 Canadian federal election: Durham
Party	Candidate	Votes	%	±%	Expenditures
Conservative	Erin O'Toole	31,423	46.39	+4.28	$112,775.26
Liberal	Jonathan Giancroce	20,267	29.92	–2.33	$56,079.34
New Democratic	Christopher Cameron	11,865	17.52	–0.73	$4,774.16
People's	Patricia Conlin	3,725	5.50	+3.51	$8,162.85
Independent	Sarah Gabrielle Baron	251	0.37	–	$2,215.46
Rhinoceros	Adam Smith	150	0.22	–	none listed
Independent	Kurdil-Telt Patch	49	0.07	–	none listed
Total valid votes/expense limit		67,730	99.33	–	$135,835.56
Total rejected ballots		455	0.67	+0.01	
Turnout		68,185	61.19	–6.80	
Eligible voters		111,428			
Conservative hold		Swing		+3.30	
Source: Elections Canada

2019 Canadian federal election: Durham
Party	Candidate	Votes	%	±%	Expenditures
Conservative	Erin O'Toole	30,752	42.12	-3.01	$86,288.22
Liberal	Jonathan Giancroce	23,547	32.25	-3.50	$50,364.45
New Democratic	Sarah Whalen-Wright	13,323	18.25	+2.22	$3,348.10
Green	Evan Price	3,950	5.41	+2.89	none listed
People's	Brenda Virtue	1,442	1.97	–	$2,377.06
Total valid votes/expense limit		73,014	99.35		
Total rejected ballots		480	0.65	+0.29	
Turnout		73,494	67.99	-0.49	
Eligible voters		108,096			
Conservative hold		Swing		+0.25	
Source: Elections Canada

2015 Canadian federal election: Durham
Party	Candidate	Votes	%	±%	Expenditures
Conservative	Erin O'Toole	28,967	45.13	−10.04	$117,180.89
Liberal	Corinna Traill	22,949	35.75	+20.22	$51,458.76
New Democratic	Derek Spence	10,289	16.03	−7.72	$21,240.10
Green	Stacey Leadbetter	1,616	2.52	−2.04	$109.90
Christian Heritage	Andrew Moriarity	364	0.57	–	$4,224.95
Total valid votes/expense limit		64,185	99.64		$236,417.96
Total rejected ballots		233	0.36	–	
Turnout		64,418	68.48	–	
Eligible voters		94,069			
Conservative hold		Swing		-15.13	
Source: Elections Canada

2011 federal election redistributed results
Party	Vote	%
Conservative	27,900	55.17
New Democratic	12,011	23.75
Liberal	7,857	15.54
Green	2,307	4.56
Others	499	0.99

Canadian federal by-election, November 26, 2012: Durham Resignation of Bev Oda
Party	Candidate	Votes	%	±%	Expenditures
Conservative	Erin O'Toole	17,280	50.72	−3.82	$95,331
New Democratic	Larry O'Connor	8,946	26.26	+5.16	$96,257
Liberal	Grant Humes	5,887	17.28	−0.57	$91,946
Green	Virginia Ervin	1,386	4.07	−1.32	$742
Christian Heritage	Andrew Moriarity	437	1.28	+0.49	$4,379
Online	Michael Nicula	132	0.39	–	$1,080
Total valid votes		34,068	99.66		
Total rejected ballots		115	0.34	-0.12	
Turnout		34,183	35.72	-27.50	
Eligible voters		95,710			
Conservative hold		Swing		−4.49	
Source: Elections Canada

2011 Canadian federal election: Durham
Party	Candidate	Votes	%	±%	Expenditures
Conservative	Bev Oda	31,737	54.55	+0.49	–
New Democratic	Tammy Schoep	12,277	21.10	+10.72	–
Liberal	Grant Humes	10,387	17.85	-5.18	–
Green	Stephen Leahy	3,134	5.39	-6.05	–
Christian Heritage	Andrew Moriarty	462	0.79	-0.30	–
Libertarian	Blaize Barnicoat	187	0.32	–	–
Total valid votes		58,184	99.54		–
Total rejected ballots		267	0.46	+0.12	
Turnout		58,451	63.21	+2.74	
Eligible voters		92,470	–	–	
Conservative hold		Swing		-5.11	

2008 Canadian federal election: Durham
Party	Candidate	Votes	%	±%	Expenditures
Conservative	Bev Oda	28,551	54.05	+7.04	$69,054
Liberal	Bryan Ransom	12,167	23.03	-6.98	$34,901
Green	Stephen Leahy	6,041	11.44	+6.79	$4,147
New Democratic	Andrew McKeever (withdrawn)	5,485	10.38	-6.88	$1,896
Christian Heritage	Henry Zekveld	577	1.09	+0.03	$2,529
Total valid votes		52,821	99.67		$90,063
Total rejected ballots		177	0.33	+0.04	
Turnout		52,998	60.48	-8.78	
Conservative hold		Swing		+7.01	

2006 Canadian federal election: Durham
Party	Candidate	Votes	%	±%
Conservative	Bev Oda	27,087	47.02	+6.27
Liberal	Doug Moffatt	17,290	30.01	-8.26
New Democratic	Bruce Rogers	9,946	17.26	+2.15
Green	Virginia Ervin	2,676	4.64	+0.56
Christian Heritage	Henry Zekveld	612	1.06	-0.73
Total valid votes		57,611		
Total rejected ballots		168	0.29	-0.20
Turnout		57,779	69.26	+5.02
Conservative hold		Swing		+7.26

=== Clarington—Scugog—Uxbridge, 2003–2004 ===
2004 Canadian federal election: Clarington—Scugog—Uxbridge
Party	Candidate	Votes	%	±%
Conservative	Bev Oda	20,813	40.74	-9.15
Liberal	Timothy O. E. Lang	19,548	38.27	-5.88
New Democratic	Bruce Rogers	7,721	15.11	+10.26
Green	Virginia Ervin	2,085	4.08	
Christian Heritage	Durk Bruinsma	915	1.79	
Total valid votes		51,082	99.51	
Total rejected ballots		251	0.49	
Turnout		51,333	64.24	
Conservative notional hold		Swing		-1.64

^ Change based on redistributed results. Conservative change based on combined Progressive Conservative and Canadian Alliance results.

2000 federal election redistributed results
Party	Vote	%
Liberal	17,901	44.15
Canadian Alliance	12,557	30.97
Progressive Conservative	7,676	18.93
New Democratic	2,085	4.08
Others	915	1.79

=== Durham, 1987–2003 ===
Graph of election results in Durham (1988-2003, minor parties that never got 2% of the vote or didn't run consistently are omitted)

2000 Canadian federal election: Durham
Party	Candidate	Votes	%	±%
Liberal	Alex Shepherd	20,602	45.20	+1.86
Alliance	Gerry Skipwith	13,743	30.15	+1.68
Progressive Conservative	Sam Cureatz	8,367	18.36	-1.26
New Democratic	Ken Ranney	2,545	5.58	-1.50
Independent	Durk Bruinsma	326	0.72	-0.77
Total valid votes		45,583	99.69	
Total rejected ballots		144	0.31	-0.09
Turnout		45,727	56.64	-7.50
Liberal hold		Swing		+0.09

1997 Canadian federal election: Durham
Party	Candidate	Votes	%	±%
Liberal	Alex Shepherd	19,878	43.34	+6.58
Reform	Ian Smyth	13,059	28.47	-1.98
Progressive Conservative	Sam Cureatz	8,995	19.61	-4.92
New Democratic	Colin Argyle	3,250	7.09	+2.93
Christian Heritage	Durk Bruinsma	682	1.49	+0.33
Total valid votes		45,864	99.59	
Total rejected ballots		188	0.41	
Turnout		46,052	64.15	
Liberal hold		Swing		+4.28

1993 Canadian federal election: Durham
Party	Candidate	Votes	%	±%
Liberal	Alex Shepherd	22,383	36.76	+7.63
Reform	Ian Smyth	18,543	30.45	
Progressive Conservative	Ross Stevenson	14,940	24.54	-21.93
New Democratic	Lucy Rybka-Becker	2,529	4.15	-15.80
National	W.H. Harry Pope	1,169	1.92	
Christian Heritage	Durk T. Bruinsma	707	1.16	-2.06
Green	Judy Hurvid	350	0.57	-0.04
Natural Law	Micheal Paul Larmand	271	0.45	
Liberal gain from Progressive Conservative		Swing		+14.78

1988 Canadian federal election: Durham
Party	Candidate	Votes	%
Progressive Conservative	Ross Stevenson	24,065	46.47
Liberal	Doug Moffatt	15,083	29.13
New Democratic	Margaret Wilbur	10,334	19.95
Christian Heritage	John Kuipers	1,666	3.22
Libertarian	Rolf Posma	323	0.62
Green	Harold Tausch	316	0.61

=== Durham, 1904–1968 ===
Graph of election results in Durham (1904-1968, minor parties that never got 2% of the vote or didn't run consistently are omitted)

1965 Canadian federal election: Durham
Party	Candidate	Votes	%	±%}
Liberal	Russell Honey	8,017	42.49	-3.73
Progressive Conservative	Garnet Rickard	6,725	35.64	-7.21
New Democratic	John Anthony Cheyne Ketchum	3,948	20.93	+10.85
Social Credit	Wilbur N. Grandall	177	0.94	+0.08
Liberal hold		Swing		+1.74

1963 Canadian federal election: Durham
Party	Candidate	Votes	%	±%}
Liberal	Russell Honey	8,720	46.22	+2.06
Progressive Conservative	Garnet Rickard	8,084	42.85	+0.17
New Democratic	Eileen Ethel Coutts	1,901	10.08	-2.21
Social Credit	Wilbur N. Crandall	161	0.85	-0.02

1962 Canadian federal election: Durham
Party	Candidate	Votes	%	±%}
Liberal	Russell Honey	7,971	44.16	+8.63
Progressive Conservative	Percy Vivian	7,704	42.68	-13.28
New Democratic	Eileen Coutts	2,217	12.28	+3.77
Social Credit	Kenneth C. Toms	158	0.88	

1958 Canadian federal election: Durham
Party	Candidate	Votes	%	±%}
Progressive Conservative	Percy Vivian	9,732	55.96	+11.47
Liberal	Russell C. Honey	6,178	35.53	-5.92
Co-operative Commonwealth	Ernest Dent	1,480	8.51	-3.13

1957 Canadian federal election: Durham
Party	Candidate	Votes	%	±%}
Progressive Conservative	Percy Vivian	7,331	44.49	-0.48
Liberal	John Mason James	6,829	41.45	-4.78
Co-operative Commonwealth	Ernest Dent	1,918	11.64	+2.84
Social Credit	Kenneth Toms	399	2.42	

1953 Canadian federal election: Durham
Party	Candidate	Votes	%	±%}
Liberal	John Mason James	6,684	46.22	-0.44
Progressive Conservative	Charles Elwood Stephenson	6,504	44.98	+1.23
Co-operative Commonwealth	Merdith Roy Armstrong	1,273	8.80	-0.78

1949 Canadian federal election: Durham
Party	Candidate	Votes	%	±%}
Liberal	John Mason James	6,907	46.66	+1.89
Progressive Conservative	Charles Elwood Stephenson	6,476	43.75	-4.57
Co-operative Commonwealth	James David Kenny	1,419	9.59	+2.68

1945 Canadian federal election: Durham
Party	Candidate	Votes	%	±%}
Progressive Conservative	Charles Elwood Stephenson	6,479	48.32	+3.69
Liberal	W. Frank Rickard	6,003	44.77	-10.60
Co-operative Commonwealth	Wilfrd George Bowles	926	6.91	

1940 Canadian federal election: Durham
Party	Candidate	Votes	%	±%}
Liberal	Wilbert Franklin Rickard	6,743	55.37	+7.37
National Government	William Ross Strike	5,435	44.63	+0.05

1935 Canadian federal election: Durham
Party	Candidate	Votes	%	±%}
Liberal	Wilbert Frank Rickard	6,649	48.00	+4.66
Conservative	Fred Wellington Bowen	6,176	44.58	-12.08
Reconstruction	R. Rufus Choate Macknight	531	3.83	
Co-operative Commonwealth	Ralph Sharpe Staples	497	3.59	

1930 Canadian federal election: Durham
Party	Candidate	Votes	%	±%}
Conservative	Fred Wellington Bowen	6,827	56.67	+0.23
Liberal	Montague John Holman	5,221	43.33	
Source: lop.parl.ca

1926 Canadian federal election: Durham
Party	Candidate	Votes	%	±%}
Conservative	Fred Wellington Bowen	6,508	56.43	+2.82
Liberal–Progressive	Melville Howden Staples	5,024	43.57	

1925 Canadian federal election: Durham
Party	Candidate	Votes	%	±%}
Conservative	Fred Wellington Bowen	7,020	53.61	+12.71
Liberal	Charles Vincent Massey	6,074	46.39	+5.48

1921 Canadian federal election: Durham
Party	Candidate	Votes	%	±%}
Conservative	Fred Wellington Bowen	5,106	40.90	-39.93
Progressive	Thomas Albert Victor Reid	3,936	31.53	
Liberal	William Thomas Roche Preston	3,441	27.57	+8.40

1917 Canadian federal election: Durham
Party	Candidate	Votes	%	±%}
Government (Unionist)	Newton Rowell	5,923	80.84	+24.66
Opposition (Laurier Liberals)	George William Jones	1,404	19.16	-24.66

1911 Canadian federal election: Durham
Party	Candidate	Votes	%	±%
Conservative	Charles Jonas Thornton	3,291	56.18	+1.12
Liberal	Thomas Alexander Kelly	2,567	43.82	-1.12

1908 Canadian federal election: Durham
Party	Candidate	Votes	%	±%
Conservative	Charles Jonas Thornton	3,387	55.06	+3.92
Liberal	David Burke Simpson	2,764	44.94	-3.92

1904 Canadian federal election: Durham
Party	Candidate	Votes	%
Conservative	Henry Alfred Ward	3,322	51.15
Liberal	Allen B. Aylesworth	3,173	48.85

== See also ==
- List of Canadian electoral districts
- Historical federal electoral districts of Canada
