= Durham (provincial electoral district) =

Provincial electoral district in Ontario, Canada

Coordinates: 44.065°N 78.881°W

Ontario electoral district
- Durham in relation to other electoral districts in Southern Ontario

Provincial electoral district
- Legislature: Legislative Assembly of Ontario
MPP
Todd McCarthy
Progressive Conservative
- District created: 1999
- First contested: 1999
- Last contested: 2025

Demographics
- Population (2016): 130,870
- Electors (2018): 102,471
- Area (km²): 914
- Pop. density (per km²): 143.2
- Census division: Durham
- Census subdivision(s): Clarington, Mississaugas of Scugog Island, Scugog, Uxbridge

Durham is a provincial electoral district in Ontario, Canada, that has been represented in the Legislative Assembly of Ontario since 1999 and from 1926 to 1975.

The Durham provincial riding was created in 1999 when Ontario adopted federal riding boundaries for provincial elections purposes. It was created from Durham East and Oshawa.

It consisted initially of the Township of Scugog, Scugog Indian Reserve No. 34, the town of Clarington, and the part of the city of Oshawa lying north of a line drawn from west to east along Taunton Road, south along Ritson Road North, east along Rossland Road East, south along Harmony Road North, and east along King Street East.

In 2007, the riding gained the Township of Uxbridge but lost all of its territory in Oshawa with the exception of the areas north of Taunton Road.

== Members of Provincial Parliament ==
Assembly	Years	Member	Party
Riding created
15th	1919–1923	John Bragg	Liberal
16th	1923–1926	John Bragg	Liberal
17th	1926–1929	John Bragg	Liberal
18th	1929–1934	John Bragg	Liberal
19th	1934–1937	John Bragg	Liberal
20th	1937–1943	Cecil George Mercer	Liberal
21st	1943–1945	Percival Vivian	Progressive Conservative
22nd	1945–1948	Percival Vivian	Progressive Conservative
23rd	1948–1951	John Foote	Progressive Conservative
24th	1951–1955	John Foote	Progressive Conservative
25th	1955–1959	John Foote	Progressive Conservative
26th	1959–1963	Hugh Carruthers	Progressive Conservative
27th	1963–1967	Hugh Carruthers	Progressive Conservative
28th	1967–1971	Hugh Carruthers	Progressive Conservative
29th	1971–1975	Hugh Carruthers	Progressive Conservative
Riding dissolved
Riding created from Durham East and Oshawa
37th	1999–2003	John O'Toole	Progressive Conservative
38th	2003–2007	John O'Toole	Progressive Conservative
39th	2007–2011	John O'Toole	Progressive Conservative
40th	2011–2014	John O'Toole	Progressive Conservative
41st	2014–2018	Granville Anderson	Liberal
42nd	2018–2021	Lindsey Park	Progressive Conservative
42nd	2021–2022	Lindsey Park	Independent
43rd	2022–present	Todd McCarthy	Progressive Conservative

== Election results ==
Winning party in each polling division of Durham at the 2025 Ontario general election

2025 Ontario general election
Party	Candidate	Votes	%	±%
Progressive Conservative	Todd McCarthy	26,967	50.48	+4.63
Liberal	Brad Jakobsen	15,701	29.39	+4.50
New Democratic	Chris Borgia	7,635	14.29	–4.30
Green	Sanjin Zeco	1,280	2.4	–1.62
New Blue	James Leventakis	666	1.25	–2.60
Centrist	Asif Khan	635	1.19	N/A
Ontario Party	Sheri Thurston	409	0.77	–0.62
Independent	Fawad Kiyani	130	0.24	N/A
Total valid votes/expense limit		53,423	99.28	–0.23
Total rejected, unmarked, and declined ballots		389	0.72	+0.23
Turnout		53,812	44.53	+0.82
Eligible voters		120,839		
Progressive Conservative hold		Swing		+0.07
Source: Elections Ontario

Winning party in each polling division of Durham at the 2022 Ontario general election

2022 Ontario general election
Party	Candidate	Votes	%	±%
Progressive Conservative	Todd McCarthy	22,614	45.85	−1.14
Liberal	Granville Anderson	12,276	24.89	+8.06
New Democratic	Chris Borgia	9,168	18.59	−13.07
Green	Mini Batra	1,981	4.02	+0.14
New Blue	Spencer Ford	1,898	3.85	
Independent	Tony Stravato	697	1.41	
Ontario Party	Lou De Vuono	686	1.39	
Total valid votes		49,320	100.0	
Total rejected, unmarked, and declined ballots		242		
Turnout		49,562	43.71	
Eligible voters		112,487		
Progressive Conservative gain from Independent		Swing		−4.60
Source(s) "Summary of Valid Votes Cast for Each Candidate" (PDF). Elections Ontario. Archived from the original on May 18, 2023. "Statistical Summary by Electoral District" (PDF). Elections Ontario. Archived from the original on May 21, 2023.

2018 Ontario general election
Party	Candidate	Votes	%	±%
Progressive Conservative	Lindsey Park	28,575	46.99	+14.38
New Democratic	Joel Usher	19,253	31.66	+3.22
Liberal	Granville Anderson	10,237	16.84	−17.35
Green	Michelle Corbett	2,360	3.88	−0.05
Libertarian	Ryan Robinson	382	0.63	-0.21
Total valid votes		60,807	99.01	
Total rejected, unmarked and declined ballots		609	0.99	
Turnout		61,416	59.94	
Eligible voters		102,471		
Progressive Conservative notional gain from Liberal		Swing		+15.87
Source(s) "Summary of Valid Votes Cast for each Candidate" (PDF). Elections Ontario.

2014 general election redistributed results
Party	Vote	%
Liberal	16,532	34.19
Progressive Conservative	15,768	32.61
New Democratic	13,752	28.44
Green	1,899	3.93
Others	405	0.84

2014 Ontario general election
Party	Candidate	Votes	%	±%
Liberal	Granville Anderson	19,816	36.45	+7.10
Progressive Conservative	Mike Patrick	18,640	34.29	−14.78
New Democratic	Derek Spence	13,094	24.08	+6.49
Green	Halyna Zalucky	2,382	4.39	+1.70
Libertarian	Conner Toye	434	0.80	−0.13
Total valid votes		54,336	100.0	
Liberal gain from Progressive Conservative		Swing		+10.94
Source(s) Elections Ontario (2014). "Official result from the records, 019 Durham" (PDF).

2011 Ontario general election
Party	Candidate	Votes	%	±%
Progressive Conservative	John O'Toole	22,393	49.07	+2.14
Liberal	Betty Somerville	13,394	29.35	−2.83
New Democratic	James Terry	8,027	17.59	+5.53
Green	Edward Yaghledjian	1,221	2.68	−6.15
Libertarian	Blaize Barnicoat	424	0.93	
Freedom	David Strutt	172	0.38	
Total valid votes		45,631	100.0	−0.41
Total rejected, unmarked and declined ballots		173	0.38	−0.14
Turnout		45,804	49.74	−4.60
Eligible Voters		92,906		+9.62
Progressive Conservative hold		Swing		+2.49
Source(s) "Summary of valid votes cast for each candidate – October 6, 2011 General Election" (PDF). Elections Ontario. November 18, 2011. "Election Summary" ( XLS Spreadsheet). Elections Ontario. October 1, 2013.

2007 Ontario general election
Party	Candidate	Votes	%	±%
Progressive Conservative	John O'Toole	21,515	46.96	−0.14
Liberal	Betty Somerville	14,730	32.15	−4.61
New Democratic	Catherine Robinson	5,521	12.05	−0.36
Green	June Davies	4,053	8.85	+6.51
Total valid votes		45,819	100.0	−9.39
Total rejected ballots		240	0.52	−0.22
Voter turnout		46,059	54.34	−4.06
Eligible voters		84,755		−2.85
Sources: "Summary of valid votes cast for each candidate – October 10, 2007 General Election" (PDF). Elections Ontario. August 14, 2008. "Statistical Summary — General Elections 2007" (PDF). Elections Ontario. May 8, 2008.

2003 Ontario general election
Party	Candidate	Votes	%	±%
Progressive Conservative	John O'Toole	23,814	47.09	−9.98
Liberal	Garry Minnie	18,590	36.76	+4.64
New Democratic	Teresa Williams	6,274	12.41	+3.15
Green	Gordon H. Macdonald	1,183	2.34	+1.32
Freedom	Cathy McKeever	707	1.40	
Total valid votes		50,568	100.0	+10.55
Total rejected ballots		378	0.74	+0.19
Voter turnout		50,946	58.40	−0.11
Eligible voters		87,237		+10.98
Sources: "Summary of Valid Ballots by Candidate – General Election of October 2, 2003". Elections Ontario. "Statistical Summary — General Elections of October 2, 2003". Elections Ontario.

1999 Ontario general election
Party	Candidate	Votes	%
Progressive Conservative	John O'Toole	26,103	57.07
Liberal	Garry Minnie	14,694	32.12
New Democratic	Jim Morrison	4,235	9.26
Green	Gail Thompson	467	1.02
Natural Law	Jacinthe Millaire	242	0.53
Total valid votes		45,741	100.0
Total rejected ballots		253	0.55
Voter turnout		45,994	58.51
Eligible voters		78,608	
Sources: "Summary of Valid Ballots by Candidate – General Election June 3 1999". Elections Ontario. "Statistical Summary — General Election of June 3 1999". Elections Ontario.

=== 1926–1975 ===
1971 Ontario general election
Party	Candidate	Votes	%	±%
Progressive Conservative	Alex Carruthers	10,628	48.22	+2.94
New Democratic	Doug Moffatt	7,174	32.55	+7.91
Liberal	Robin Russell	4,239	19.23	–10.85
Total valid votes		22,041	99.68	
Total rejected ballots		71	0.32	–0.25
Turnout		22,112	76.47	+4.12
Eligible voters		28,917		
Progressive Conservative hold		Swing		–2.48
Source: Elections Ontario

1967 Ontario general election
Party	Candidate	Votes	%	±%
Progressive Conservative	Alex Carruthers	7,650	45.27	–5.91
Liberal	Richard Lovekin	5,083	30.08	–11.39
New Democratic	Doug Moffatt	4,164	24.64	+17.30
Total valid votes		16,897	99.43	
Total rejected ballots		97	0.57	+0.00
Turnout		16,994	72.35	+1.60
Eligible voters		23,489		
Progressive Conservative hold		Swing		+2.74
Source: Elections Ontario

1963 Ontario general election
Party	Candidate	Votes	%	±%
Progressive Conservative	Alex Carruthers	7,914	51.18	+0.31
Liberal	Allan Beer	6,413	41.48	+5.06
New Democratic	Harold Ashton	1,135	7.34	–5.37
Total valid votes		15,462	99.43	
Total rejected ballots		88	0.57	–0.25
Turnout		15,550	70.75	+6.62
Eligible voters		21,979		
Progressive Conservative hold		Swing		–2.37
Source: Elections Ontario

1959 Ontario general election
Party	Candidate	Votes	%	±%
Progressive Conservative	Alex Carruthers	6,946	50.87	–2.48
Liberal	Ted Woodyard	4,972	36.41	+0.95
Co-operative Commonwealth	Merdith Roy Armstrong	1,736	12.71	+1.53
Total valid votes		13,654	99.19	
Total rejected ballots		112	0.81	–0.03
Turnout		13,766	64.13	–3.02
Eligible voters		21,465		
Progressive Conservative hold		Swing		–1.72
Source: Elections Ontario

1955 Ontario general election
Party	Candidate	Votes	%	±%
Progressive Conservative	John Weir Foote	6,939	53.36	+1.57
Liberal	David Ford	4,612	35.46	–0.35
Co-operative Commonwealth	Merdith Roy Armstrong	1,454	11.18	–1.22
Total valid votes		13,005	99.15	
Total rejected ballots		111	0.85	–0.15
Turnout		13,116	67.15	–9.77
Eligible voters		19,532		
Progressive Conservative hold		Swing		+0.96
Source: Elections Ontario

1951 Ontario general election
Party	Candidate	Votes	%	±%
Progressive Conservative	John Weir Foote	7,389	51.79	+6.39
Liberal	George Walton	5,110	35.81	+0.77
Co-operative Commonwealth	Spencer W. Cheshire	1,769	12.40	–7.17
Total valid votes		14,268	99.00	
Total rejected ballots		144	1.00	+0.19
Turnout		14,412	76.93	+5.65
Eligible voters		18,735		
Progressive Conservative hold		Swing		+2.81
Source: Elections Ontario

1948 Ontario general election
Party	Candidate	Votes	%	±%
Progressive Conservative	John Weir Foote	5,858	45.39	–7.97
Liberal	T. Garnet Shield	4,522	35.04	+1.31
Co-operative Commonwealth	Norman Allison	2,525	19.57	+6.66
Total valid votes		12,905	99.19	
Total rejected ballots		105	0.81	+0.08
Turnout		13,010	71.27	–4.76
Eligible voters		18,254		
Progressive Conservative hold		Swing		–4.64
Source: Elections Ontario

1945 Ontario general election
Party	Candidate	Votes	%	±%
Progressive Conservative	Percy Vivian	7,027	53.36	+12.66
Liberal	George S. Annis	4,442	33.73	–4.33
Co-operative Commonwealth	William L. Lycett	1,700	12.91	–8.33
Total valid votes		13,169	99.28	
Total rejected ballots		96	0.72	+0.21
Turnout		13,265	76.03	+9.57
Eligible voters		17,446		
Progressive Conservative hold		Swing		+8.50
Source: Elections Ontario

1943 Ontario general election
Party	Candidate	Votes	%	±%
Progressive Conservative	Percy Vivian	4,412	40.70	–7.07
Liberal	Cecil Mercer	4,126	38.06	–14.17
Co-operative Commonwealth	Wilfred George Bowles	2,303	21.24	–
Total valid votes		10,841	99.49	
Total rejected ballots		56	0.51	–0.19
Turnout		10,897	66.47	–12.64
Eligible voters		16,394		
Progressive Conservative gain from Liberal		Swing		+3.55
Source: Elections Ontario

1937 Ontario general election
Party	Candidate	Votes	%	±%
Liberal	Cecil Mercer	7,183	52.23	+6.48
Conservative	Milton J. Elliott	6,569	47.77	+3.98
Total valid votes		13,752	99.29	
Total rejected ballots		98	0.71	+0.10
Turnout		13,850	79.11	+4.79
Eligible voters		17,507		
Liberal hold		Swing		+5.23
Source: Elections Ontario

1934 Ontario general election
Party	Candidate	Votes	%	±%
Liberal	William John Bragg	6,232	45.75	–4.29
Conservative	Milton J. Elliott	5,964	43.79	–6.17
Co-operative Commonwealth	Lorna Helen Cotton	1,425	10.46	–
Total valid votes		13,621	99.39	
Total rejected ballots		83	0.61	–0.77
Turnout		13,704	74.32	+2.59
Eligible voters		18,438		
Liberal hold		Swing		+5.23
Source: Elections Ontario

1929 Ontario general election
Party	Candidate	Votes	%	±%
Liberal	William John Bragg	5,860	50.04	–5.23
Conservative	Milton J. Elliott	5,850	49.96	+5.23
Total valid votes		11,710	98.63	
Total rejected ballots		163	1.37	+0.63
Turnout		11,873	71.73	–2.14
Eligible voters		16,552		
Liberal hold		Swing		–5.23
Source: Elections Ontario

1926 Ontario general election
Party	Candidate	Votes	%	±%
Liberal	William John Bragg	6,639	55.27	–
Conservative	Thomas Butterfield Chalk	5,372	44.73	–
Total valid votes		12,011	99.26	
Total rejected ballots		90	0.74	–
Turnout		12,101	73.87	–
Eligible voters		16,381		
Liberal pickup new district.				
Source: Elections Ontario

== 2007 electoral reform referendum ==
2007 Ontario electoral reform referendum
Side	Votes	%
First Past the Post	30,290	67.3
Mixed member proportional	14,750	32.7
Total valid votes	45,040	100.0

== See also ==
- List of Ontario provincial electoral districts
- Canadian provincial electoral districts
