= Bev Oda =

Retired Canadian politician

The Honourable Bev Oda PC
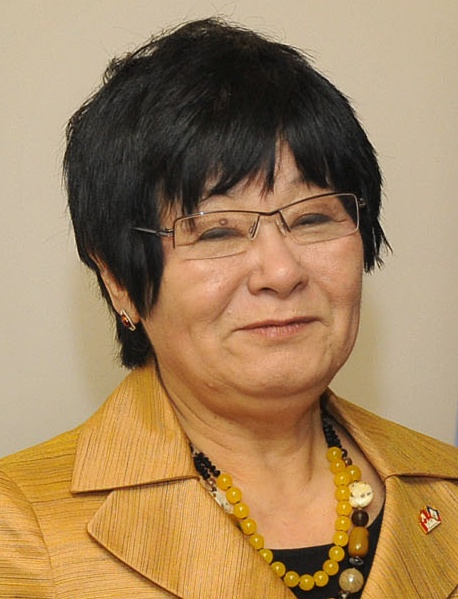
- Oda in 2011

Minister for International Cooperation
- In office August 14, 2007 – July 4, 2012
- Prime Minister: Stephen Harper
- Preceded by: Josée Verner
- Succeeded by: Julian Fantino

Minister of Canadian Heritage and Status of Women
- In office February 6, 2006 – August 14, 2007
- Prime Minister: Stephen Harper
- Preceded by: Liza Frulla (Canadian Heritage)
- Succeeded by: Josée Verner

Member of Parliament for Durham
- In office June 28, 2004 – July 31, 2012
- Preceded by: Alex Shepherd
- Succeeded by: Erin O'Toole

Personal details
- Born: Beverley Joan Oda; July 27, 1944 (age 82) Thunder Bay, Ontario, Canada
- Party: Conservative
- Domestic partner: Don MacPherson (died 1998)
- Education: University of Toronto; Lakeshore Teachers College
- Profession: Broadcasting executive, communication consultant, teacher

Beverley Joan Oda PC (born July 27, 1944) is a retired Canadian politician. She was a member of the House of Commons of Canada, as well as the first Japanese-Canadian MP and cabinet minister in Canadian history. She represented the riding of Durham for the Conservative Party of Canada. She was appointed Minister of Canadian Heritage and Status of Women on February 6, 2006. She was appointed Minister for International Cooperation on August 14, 2007. On July 3, 2012, Oda announced she was resigning her seat in the House of Commons effective at the end of the month following public controversy about her spending habits; she was dropped from Cabinet the following day.

== Early life, education ==
Oda, a sansei, was born in Thunder Bay, Ontario. Her mother was interned at Bay Farm in 1942, and her father went to southwestern Ontario to work on a sugar beet farm. He moved to Fort William to do millwork (where he met his wife) and later to Mississauga, Ontario. Oda has a Bachelor of Arts degree from the University of Toronto and studied at Lakeshore Teacher's College. A longtime resident of Mississauga, Oda taught at schools in the area. Following her private sector career, Oda moved to Orono, Ontario in 1999.

== Broadcasting career ==
She began her broadcasting career at TVOntario in 1973, and later worked for Citytv and the Global Television Network. Oda was an Ontario Film Review Board Member in 1986–87, and a Canadian Radio-television and Telecommunications Commission Commissioner from 1987 to 1993. She became the Chair of FUND (now The Harold Greenberg Fund) in 1994. From 1995 to 1999, she was a Senior Vice-President of CTV and Baton Broadcasting. She was inducted into the Canadian Association of Broadcasters Hall of Fame in November 2003, and was awarded The Queen's Golden Jubilee Medal in recognition of work in broadcasting. She has also worked as a policy adviser to three Secretaries of State.

== Member of Parliament and Cabinet Minister ==
Oda was for many years a volunteer with the Progressive Conservative Party. She ran as a Conservative in Clarington—Scugog—Uxbridge in the 2004 federal election, and won a narrow victory over Liberal Timothy Lang.

Following her election, Oda was named as the Conservative Party critic for the Ministry of Heritage. She has argued in favour of allowing more Canadian and foreign programming options in the country.

On November 15, 2004, she reintroduced Bill C-333, the Chinese Canadian Recognition and Redress Act, which calls on parliament to recognize the contribution of Chinese immigrants to Canada, and acknowledge the unjust past treatments of Chinese Canadians as a result of racist legislation. Oda is not herself Chinese, but is Canada's first parliamentarian of Japanese heritage.

In the 2006 election, she was re-elected in the riding of Durham with 47% of the vote in the riding, despite controversy over campaign funding by US copyright proponents.

On February 6, 2006, Oda was sworn in as Heritage Minister in the cabinet of the newly elected Conservative government under Prime Minister Stephen Harper. She is the first Japanese-Canadian cabinet minister in Canadian history.

Oda was appointed the Minister of International Cooperation on August 14, 2007. As Canada's Minister for International Cooperation, she was responsible for Canada's overseas development assistance through the Canadian International Development Agency (CIDA). Oda oversaw the Government's Aid Effectiveness Agenda, which committed to making Canada's international assistance more efficient, focused, and accountable. Oda was also responsible for Canada's contributions to the Muskoka Initiative, a global effort to reduce maternal and infant mortality and improve the health of mothers and children in the world's poorest countries.

Oda was re-elected by a significant margin in the 2008 federal election, and again in the 2011 federal election.

On July 3, 2012, Oda announced that she would resign as a cabinet member and MP effective July 31. According to the Canadian Taxpayers' Federation, she is entitled to collect an MP's pension of $52,183 per year.

== Controversies and scandals ==
In November 2006, Oda planned on holding a fundraising dinner for broadcasting executives, just weeks before a major review of broadcasting rules. The event was cancelled, but a number of donations were still made.

In 2006, Oda paid back $2,200 to taxpayers after the Liberals found that she had incurred nearly $5,500 in limousine rides at the 2006 Juno Awards in Halifax. In 2008, she was accused of hiding over $17,000 of limousine expenses billed to taxpayers.

In February 2011, Bev Oda admitted to directing one of her staff to add a handwritten annotation to an already signed Canadian International Development Agency (CIDA) memo in 2009 that resulted in a funding recommendation for KAIROS being ignored. The memo was altered by the addition of 'not' into the recommendation line of the document. When asked about the matter, Oda had at first told Parliament that she did not know who had made the change. Opposition MPs on the House Foreign Affairs committee requested that the Speaker rule on the possible contempt of parliament against Oda but Prime Minister Harper continued to support Oda. On March 9, 2011, the Speaker of the House made a ruling on the issue of Oda's behaviour, stating that "on its face" Oda's explanation had caused confusion, which still persisted. Oda replied in the House that she was ready to answer to the confusion, at a House of Commons special committee meeting to be held over three full days the following week. Speaker Peter Milliken found on prima facie that the controversy warranted further investigation by a formal parliamentary committee; however, the committee was not able to reach a decision regarding Oda, as the parliamentary session was brought to an end following the non-confidence motion that triggered the 2011 federal election. That election saw Oda retain her seat with 54% of the popular vote. When Bev Oda resigned in 2012, the Quebec newspaper Le Devoir ran a front-page headline Bev Oda ~~ne~~ démissionne ~~pas~~ ("Bev Oda ~~not~~ resigning"), with the ne and pas "scratched out" as if by handwriting, in a reference to the scandal.

On April 23, 2012, it was reported that during a 2011 conference on immunization of poor children Oda had refused to stay in the conference hotel (the Grange St. Paul) furnished by hosts. She instead stayed at the Savoy Hotel at a cost of $665 per night for three nights, ordered orange juice at a cost of $16 and hired a limousine to transport her between her new hotel and the conference. She was also charged $250 for smoking in a non-smoking room. The costs incurred were at public expense. Only after widespread media reports of this misuse of public money emerged approximately ten months after the conference did Oda repay the difference in hotel costs but not the limousine costs incurred by her decision. The total amount she paid back after she was exposed by the media was $1,353.81. By April 26, it was announced that Oda had repaid the expenses incurred on the taxi rides as well.

On April 24, 2012, Oda stood in the House of Commons, in response to a question from interim Liberal leader Bob Rae, and admitted she should never have charged Canadian taxpayers for her stay at the Savoy. She said, "The expenses are unacceptable, should never have been charged to taxpayers…I have repaid the costs associated with [the] changing of hotels and I unreservedly apologize." Criticism of her spending habits continued, however. On July 3, 2012, Oda announced her intention to leave politics effective July 31, 2012, ahead of an anticipated cabinet shuffle; Oda gave no reason for her departure. Reportedly, her decision to resign was made after she was informed that she would be dropped from cabinet. On July 4, 2012, she was replaced as Minister of International Cooperation by Julian Fantino.

On March 6, 2013, Oda was awarded the "Lifetime Achievement Teddy" from the Canadian Taxpayers Federation for charging taxpayers on limos, orange juice, an air purifier for her government office so she could smoke indoors and her $52,183 annual pension.

== See also ==
- List of visible minority Canadian cabinet ministers
- List of visible minority politicians in Canada
