= Durham—Northumberland =

Ontario electoral district

Defunct federal electoral district
- Legislature: House of Commons
- District created: 1976
- District abolished: 1987
- First contested: 1979
- Last contested: 1984

Durham—Northumberland is a former federal electoral district represented in the House of Commons of Canada from 1979 to 1988. It was located in the province of Ontario. This riding was created in 1976 from parts of Northumberland—Durham and Ontario ridings.

It consisted of:

- in the Regional Municipality of Durham: the Township of Scugog and the Town of Newcastle;
- in the County of Northumberland: the Township of Hope, the Town of Port Hope, the Town of Cobourg, and the part of the Township of Hamilton lying west of the Town of Cobourg and south of Highway 401;
- in the County of Peterborough: the Township of Cavan; and
- in the County of Victoria: the Township of Manvers.

The electoral district was abolished in 1987 when it was redistributed between Durham, Northumberland and Victoria—Haliburton ridings.

== Members of Parliament ==
This riding has elected the following members of Parliament:

Parliament	Years	Member	Party
Riding created from Northumberland—Durham and Ontario
31st	1979–1980	Allan Lawrence	Progressive Conservative
32nd	1980–1984	Allan Lawrence	Progressive Conservative
33rd	1984–1988	Allan Lawrence	Progressive Conservative
Riding dissolved into Durham, Northumberland and Victoria—Haliburton

== Election results ==
1979 Canadian federal election
Party	Candidate	Votes	%
Progressive Conservative	Allan Lawrence	21,502	52.39
Liberal	Ian Wilson	10,748	26.19
New Democratic	Fred McLaughlin	8,393	20.45
Libertarian	Robert Marttila	367	0.89
Marxist–Leninist	Robert C. Platt	29	0.07

1980 Canadian federal election
Party	Candidate	Votes	%	±%
Progressive Conservative	Allan Lawrence	17,587	45.08	-7.32
Liberal	Ed Schamerhorn	11,587	29.70	+3.51
New Democratic	Fred McLaughlin	9,453	24.23	+3.78
Libertarian	Bob Marttila	374	0.96	+0.06
Marxist–Leninist	Robert C. Platt	16	-0.03	
Progressive Conservative hold		Swing		-5.41

1984 Canadian federal election
Party	Candidate	Votes	%	±%
Progressive Conservative	Allan Lawrence	24,968	59.34	+14.26
Liberal	Darce Campbell	8,740	20.77	-8.93
New Democratic	Roy Grierson	7,805	18.55	-5.68
Rhinoceros	Brian Flynn	353	0.84	
Libertarian	Gordon W. Page	211	0.50	-0.46
Progressive Conservative hold		Swing		+11.59

== See also ==
- List of Canadian federal electoral districts
- Historical federal electoral districts of Canada
