= Cecil Mercer (politician) =

Canadian politician

Cecil George Mercer
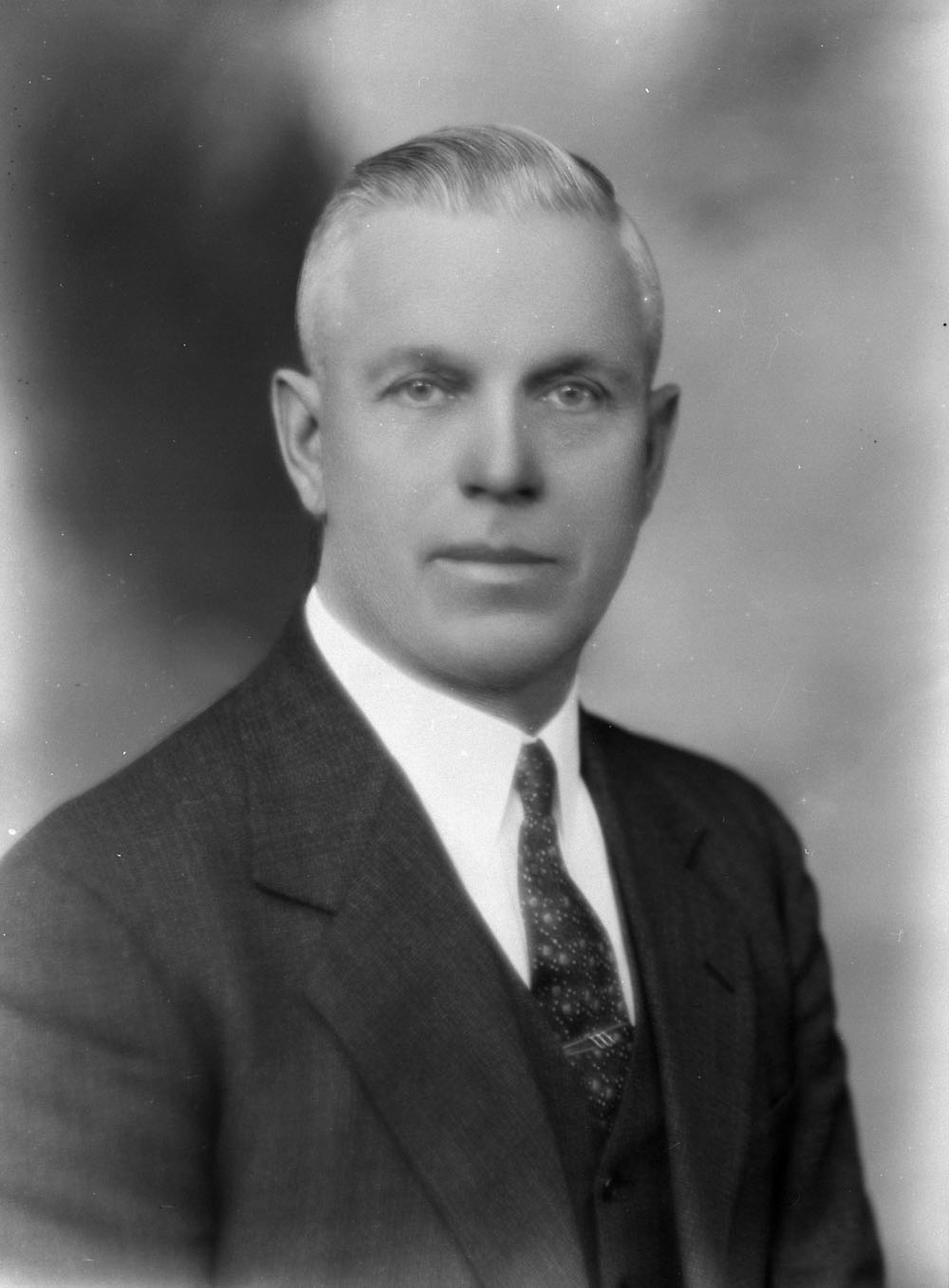
- Mercer, c. 1938

Ontario MPP
- In office 1937–1943
- Preceded by: William John Bragg
- Succeeded by: Percy Vivian
- Constituency: Durham

Personal details
- Party: Liberal

Cecil George Mercer was an Ontario political figure. He represented Durham in the Legislative Assembly of Ontario from 1937 to 1943 as a Liberal member.
