= K. Ross Stevenson =

Canadian politician

The Honourable Ross Stevenson ECO
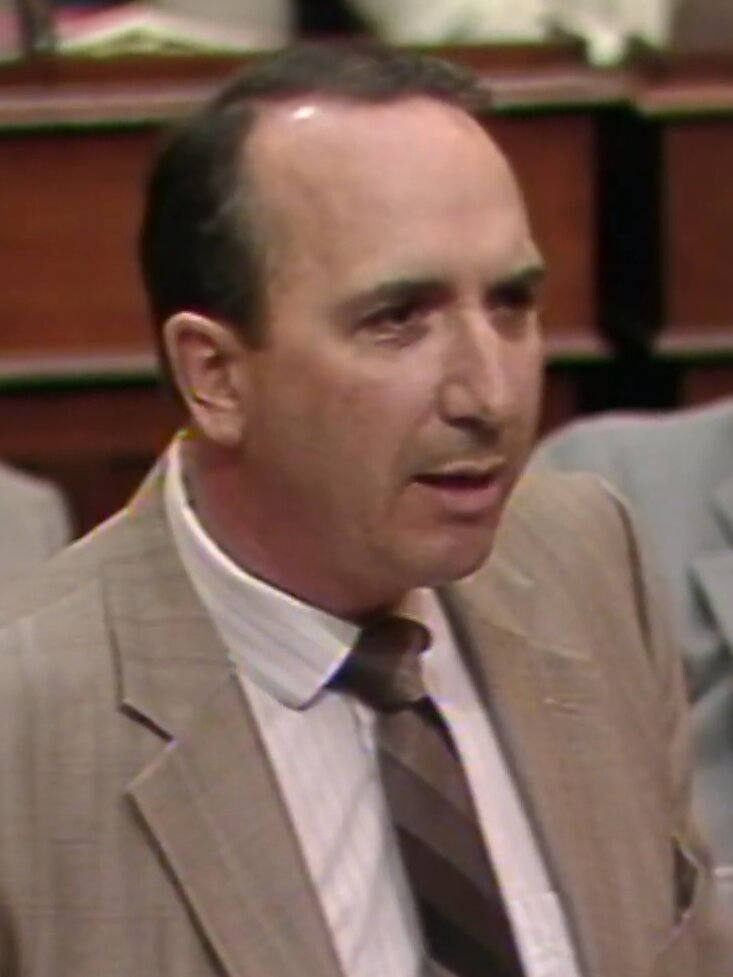
- Stevenson in 1986

Member of Parliament for Durham
- In office 1988–1993
- Preceded by: Allan Lawrence
- Succeeded by: Alex Shepherd

Ontario MPP
- In office 1981–1987
- Preceded by: Bill Newman
- Succeeded by: Bill Ballinger
- Constituency: Durham—York

Personal details
- Born: October 1, 1942 (age 83) Lindsay, Ontario
- Party: Progressive Conservative
- Occupation: Farmer, teacher

Kenneth Ross Stevenson (born October 1, 1942) is a former politician in Ontario, Canada. He served in the Legislative Assembly of Ontario from 1981 to 1987, and was briefly a cabinet minister in the government of Frank Miller. He later served in the House of Commons of Canada from 1988 to 1993. Stevenson was a member of the Progressive Conservative Party.

== Background ==
Stevenson was born in Lindsay, Ontario. He was educated at the University of Guelph and Iowa State University, earning a Ph.D. He worked as a farmer, and was a professor at the University of Guelph before entering provincial politics.

== Provincial politics ==
He was elected to the Ontario legislature in the 1981 provincial election, winning an easy victory in Durham—York. For the next four years, he served as a backbench supporter of the provincial Progressive Conservative administrations led by Bill Davis and Frank Miller. He was re-elected in the 1985 election, in which the PCs under Miller were reduced to an unstable minority government. Stevenson was named Minister of Agriculture and Food on May 17, 1985, but accomplished little in this portfolio before Miller's government was defeated in the legislature.

In opposition, Stevenson served as his party's critic for Agriculture and Food. He was defeated in the 1987 election, losing to Liberal Party candidate Bill Ballinger by 482 votes.

=== Cabinet positions ===
Miller ministry, Province of Ontario (1985)
Cabinet post (1)
Predecessor	Office	Successor
Philip Andrewes	Minister of Agriculture and Food; 1985 (May–June)	Jack Riddell

== Federal politics ==
He then turned to federal politics, and was elected to the Canadian House of Commons for Durham in the 1988 federal election. He served as a backbench supporter of the Brian Mulroney and Kim Campbell administrations over the next five years. The Progressive Conservatives were badly defeated in the 1993 federal election, and Stevenson finished third in his bid for re-election behind Liberal candidate Alex Shepherd.

== Later life ==
Stevenson later became director of strategic programs at the University of Ontario Institute of Technology. In 2003, he supported the federal Progressive Conservative Party's merger with the Canadian Alliance to create the Conservative Party of Canada. He is currently a Professor within the School of Science and Engineering Technology at Durham College.
