= Incline =

Incline, inclined, inclining, or inclination may refer to:

- Grade (slope), the tilt, steepness, or angle from horizontal of a topographic feature (hillside, meadow, etc.) or constructed element (road, railway, field, etc.)
- Slope, the tilt, steepness, or angle from horizontal of a line (in mathematics and geometry)

Incline may also refer to:

- Cable railway, a steeply graded railway that uses a cable or rope to haul trains
  - Funicular (or funicular railway, a type of cable railway), a cable railway in which a cable attached moves cars up and down a steep slope
- Inclined loop, a feature found on some roller coasters
- Orbital inclination, the tilt of an object's orbit around a celestial body
  - Inclined orbit, an orbit that does not lie on the equatorial plane
- Inclined plane, a flat surface whose endpoints are at different heights
- Inclined rig, a method of rigging a sail to direct the force of the sails in such a way as to reduce heeling
- Inclining test, a test that determines a ship's stability and the coordinates of its center of gravity
- Inclined building, a building that was intentionally built at an incline
- Inclined tower, a tower that was intentionally built at an incline
- Inclining test, a test that determines a ship's stability and the coordinates of its center of gravity
- Incline, California
- Manitou Incline, a hiking trail in Manitou Springs, Colorado

== See also ==
- Inclination (disambiguation)
- Slope (disambiguation)
- Tendency (disambiguation)
