= Liberal Party of Canada candidates in the 2004 Canadian federal election =

The Liberal Party of Canada ran a full slate of candidates in the 2004 federal election, and won 135 out of 308 seats to emerge with a minority government. Many of the party's candidates have their own biography pages; information about others may be found here.

== Nova Scotia ==
=== Susan Green (Central Nova) ===
Susan Green is a politician of the Canadian province of Nova Scotia. On July 28, 2004, she ran for the House of Commons of Canada, as a candidate of the Liberal Party in Central Nova, but lost to Peter MacKay of the Conservative Party of Canada. Green received 9,986 votes to MacKay's 16,376.

=== Dale Stevens ===
In the 2004 Canadian Federal Election Dale Stevens lost to Peter Stoffer (Sackville—Eastern Shore) of the New Democratic Party. Stevens received 11,222 votes to Stoffer's 17,925.

Dale Stevens is CEO of Clerisy Entertainment located in Halifax, Nova Scotia, Canada. Dale is producing, writing and directing a 13 episode series on ghost hunting called Ghost Cases that will be released in fall 2009. Stevens is also working on a book based on the television series for Nimbus Publishing.

Stevens’s past experience includes Vice President of Arcadia Entertainment where he worked on numerous productions including Buried at Sea (CBC, Historia), Dreamwrecks (26 episodes, CanWest MediaWorks), Freemasonry Revealed (3 episodes, VisionTV, and National Geographic International), That News Show (26 episodes, CanWest MediaWorks) and Go Deep (10 episodes, Alliance Atlantis, History Television).

== Quebec ==
=== Yves Sabourin (Argenteuil—Mirabel) ===
Yves Sabourin was born on July 21, 1955, in Lachute, Quebec. He received a bachelor's degree in law in 1977 and qualified as a notary the following year. He worked for Paul Martin in the 2003 Liberal Party of Canada leadership contest. During the 2004 election, he was an associate notary with the Lachute firm Hénault, Sabourin et Bédard and was involved in several local health care organizations.

Sabourin received 13,214 votes (26.87%), finishing second against Bloc Québécois incumbent Mario Laframboise.

== Ontario ==
=== Bruce Hood (Wellington—Halton Hills) ===
Bruce Hood was a former National Hockey League referee. He received 19,173 votes (38.21%), finishing a close second against Conservative Michael Chong.

=== Richard Mahoney (Ottawa Centre) ===
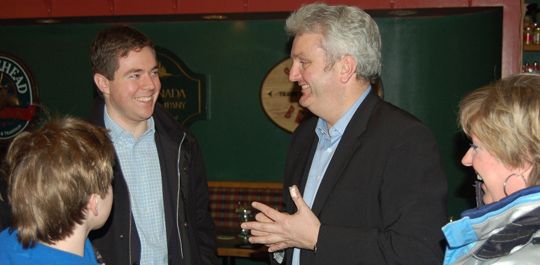
Richard Mahoney (right), speaking to a friend

Richard J. Mahoney (pronounced MAhenny) is a Canadian lawyer, specializing in public policy and regulatory law. A longtime organizer for the Liberal Party and media commentator, he returned to full-time legal practice in the early 1990s after serving in numerous capacities within Liberal governments as a strategist, executive member, advisor, and minister's aide. Mahoney is strongly associated with the fiscally moderate and socially progressive movement that characterized Canada's political state for the better part of two decades under the direction of then Finance Minister Paul Martin. He ran as the Liberal candidate in the riding of Ottawa Centre during the 2004 and 2006 Canadian federal elections. Mahoney has been a resident of Ottawa and Denholm, Quebec, for over twenty years.

Raised in Toronto, he attended the Jesuit-run Brebeuf College School and then received his B.A. in political sciences in 1982 from the University of Western Ontario. After graduating, he opted to put himself within arm's reach of Canada's political hearth and enrolled at the University of Ottawa's law school. While studying to earn his LL.B., he served as the President of the Young Liberals of Canada and worked in the offices of Prime Minister John Turner and Finance Minister Marc Lalonde. He graduated with a law degree in 1985.

Mahoney was executive assistant to Paul Martin, during the latter's unsuccessful 1990 leadership campaign. He was elected president of the Liberal Party of Ontario from 1992 to 1995. After the 1995 provincial election resulted in a Progressive Conservative victory, Mahoney traveled the province on what he "wryly called the Hugh Grant apology tour". His position as party president led Mahoney to wide media exposure in the Ontario press, and saw him acting as a political commentator for many years on TVO's Studio Two, CTV, CBC, 580 CFRA News Talk Radio, and other television and radio networks. After his term expired, he remained a close confidant of many federal and provincial politicians and was often called upon to advise Paul Martin, Canada's finance minister from 1993-2002. In 2003, the two worked closely on a successful Liberal leadership campaign, ultimately leading to Martin's election as Liberal leader and appointment as Canada's 21st Prime Minister.

After incumbent Liberal MP Mac Harb was appointed to the Senate in 2003, Mahoney garnered the party's nomination in Ottawa-Centre. Expecting to run in a by-election, he and his opponents were thrust into a national election when one was called for the early summer of the following year. The riding was captured by New Democratic Party candidate Ed Broadbent, one of the most formidable and respected politicians in Canada's recent political history. After a short-lived minority parliament, Mahoney ran as the Liberal candidate again in the election of 2006, but the riding was carried by Broadbent's NDP successor, Paul Dewar.

Early in his legal career, Mahoney directed much of his energy towards practicing refugee law, in front of the Immigration Refugee Board and the Federal Court of Canada. After his law practice evolved into other areas, he remained involved as a volunteer, assisting a number of refugees including as volunteer counsel to the SOS Viet Phi, who remained stateless in the Philippines until 2005, Vietnamese refugees after fleeing their country in the wake of the Vietnam War. He also worked, for seven years, as a director of the Royal Ottawa Hospital's fundraising foundation, using legal contacts to bring funding to community healthcare.

Mahoney has pursued a number of personal interests at the professional level as both a lawyer, sometime lobbyist and business executive. He was a senior vice president and of Borealis Capital, an investment firm owned by the OMERS pension fund. He practises business, public, regulatory and immigration law at Fraser Milner Casgrain, one of Canada's "leading business law firms" and recently sat on the board of the Canadian-American Business Council. Mahoney has used his expertise in law, government and policymaking as a representative for numerous clients, including Rogers Cable. He represents corporations from sectors such as "telecommunications, broadcasting, transportation, pharmaceuticals, biotechnology, high technology and financial services."

Mahoney's role as a lawyer and lobbyist while simultaneously hoping to become an MP was, at times, controversial. An article in the Ottawa Citizen reported Mahoney successfully lobbied the Liberal government to lower Canadian content requirements for Canadian Satellite Radio prior to obtaining his lobbyist license. However, Mahoney attended the event in question as a Liberal Party donor and the nonpartisan Office of the Registrar of Lobbyists ruled there was no wrongdoing and that he had not, in fact, lobbied the government. Mahoney, also, resigned his position at Borealis in 2004 to prevent a conflict of interest during his turns as a candidate in general election campaigns.

== Manitoba ==
=== Don Kuhl (Portage—Lisgar) ===
Kuhl is a graduate of the University of Manitoba School of Agriculture. He was a partner in the Southern Manitoba Potato Company for a number of years, and ran a family farm from 1978 to 2000. He has served on numerous farm organizations and was a Board Member of the Manitoba Pulse Growers Association from 1990 to 1999, serving as President for five years. Kuhl was also a vice-chairman of the Western Canadian Pulse Growers Association. Kuhl is anti-abortion on a personal level, though it is not clear if he supports government restrictions on abortion.

He served on the council of Winkler, Manitoba, from 1983 to 1998, and was the community's deputy mayor for three years. He was defeated in a bid to become mayor in 2002.

The 2004 election was his first bid for federal office. He finished second to Conservative incumbent Brian Pallister with 6,174 votes (17.74%).

=== Peter Epp (Provencher) ===
Epp is a lawyer. He holds a Bachelor of Arts degree in philosophy from the University of Manitoba, and received a Bachelor of Laws degree from the University of British Columbia. Until 1996, he practiced corporate, commercial and real estate law for the Pitblado firm in Manitoba.

He was hired by the Linklaters firm of New York in 1996, and practiced international finance and corporate law. In 1998, he undertook a one-year special appointment at the World Bank with a focus on international development financing. He later worked at the Washington, D.C., and London, UK offices of Linklaters.

Epp returned to Canada in 2004 to contest the Provencher riding, and defeated Marcel Hacault, Lee Guetre and Herm Martens to win the Liberal nomination (Winnipeg Free Press, 6 February 2004). The Liberal Party had held the riding as recently as 2000, but faced a difficult struggle to reclaim it. Epp received 8,975 votes (24.92%), finishing second against Conservative incumbent Vic Toews.

During the campaign, Epp criticized Toews for proposing to repeal a section of the Criminal Code that gives homosexuals protection from hate crimes. Toews argued that the law threatened freedom of speech and religion; Epp argued that Toews was "pandering and exploiting the fears of faith communities".

After the election, Epp accepted a position as the Senior Policy Advisor to The Honourable David Caplan, Ontario Minister of Public Infrastructure Renewal. Following that he was a partner at the London, England office of the global law firm White & Case and is now a partner at Herbert Smith LLP, an international law firm based in London.
