= McKenna Long & Aldridge =

United States-based international law and public policy firm

McKenna Long and Aldridge LLP
- No. of offices: 15
- No. of attorneys: approximately 575
- Major practice areas: Complex litigation, corporate, real estate, government contracts, health care, intellectual property, insurance, technology, environment, energy, finance, public policy, infrastructure, family wealth and exempt organizations
- Key people: Jeffrey K. Haidet (Chairman), Kurt Kicklighter (California Executive Partner), Gordon Giffin (New York Executive Partner)
- Revenue: $276.5 million (2011)
- Date founded: 2002—merger of two firms: Long Aldridge & Norman LLP (founded 1974) and McKenna & Cuneo LLP (founded 1939). Merged with Luce Forward, Hamilton & Scripps in 2012 and the firm's name remained the same.
- Company type: Limited liability partnership

McKenna Long & Aldridge LLP (MLA) was a United States-based international law and public policy firm with more than 575 attorneys and public policy advisors in 15 offices and 13 markets. The firm provided legal, business, and public policy solutions in the areas of complex litigation, corporate law, environment, energy, family wealth, finance, insurance, global infrastructure, government contracts, health care, intellectual property, technology, and real estate.

In 2012, the firm's government contracts practice marked its 54th year making it the oldest government contracts practice in the U.S. In the same year, it was ranked as the 101st largest law firm in the country by The National Law Journal's "NLJ 250" rankings and placed 100th on The American Lawyer's "AmLaw 200" rankings with US$270,000,000 in gross revenue in 2010.

The firm merged with Dentons, a large multi-national law firm, in June 2015.

== History ==
McKenna Long & Aldridge was formed by the 2002 merger of two firms—the Washington, DC–based McKenna & Cuneo and the Atlanta-based Long Aldridge & Norman. The firm that would become McKenna & Cuneo was founded in 1939 by Franklin D. Roosevelt's former attorney general, Homer Stille Cummings. In a December 1999 profile of McKenna & Cuneo, the Legal Times noted that early lawyers at the firm, Gilbert Cuneo and Albert Reeves Jr., helped create the nation's first government contracts practice. The firm that would become Long Aldridge & Norman was founded in 1974 by Clay Long, John Aldridge and Bill Stevens. The firm focused on corporate and business law through its Atlanta and Washington, DC offices.

In 2012, MLA combined practices with San Diego–based law firm Luce, Forward, Hamilton & Scripps LLP. Luce Forward, founded in 1873 by Moses A. Luce, was the first law firm founded in what would become San Diego, California, and was the firm responsible for drafting the charter that established the city. The merged firms operate under the name McKenna Long & Aldridge LLP.

In April 2015, it was agreed that the firm would merge with Dentons. The merger was completed in June 2015.

== Noteworthy cases ==
- The firm represented the government of Canada in connection with the record-breaking reorganizations of Chrysler and General Motors (GM). The firm served as lead counsel in both transactions for the government of Canada. The firm advised the government of Canada on the court-supervised sale of Chrysler that resulted in an alliance with Italian car maker Fiat. As part of the transaction, the Canadian government along with the province of Ontario provided a $3.775 billion loan, which enabled Canada to maintain its 20 percent production share in the North American market and protect nearly one million Canadian jobs. In connection with the court-supervised sale of a majority interest in GM to the equity owned largely by the U.S. Department of Treasury, the Canadian government along with the province of Ontario provided a $9.5 billion loan to the new GM—an amount proportional to the $50 billion package provided by the U.S. government.
- The firm's assisted the Mashantucket Pequot Tribal Nation in what is believed to be the first contested union election conducted under a tribal labor statute. The tribe owns and operates Foxwoods Resort Casino and hired the firm when the United Food and Commercial Workers Union (UFCW) sought to unionize Foxwoods' bartenders and beverage servicers. The firm began representing the tribe and Foxwoods in late 2007 after the National Labor Relations Board asserted jurisdiction over the tribe, which allowed the United Auto Workers to use federal law to successfully unionize Foxwoods' table games dealers. To avoid the same fate and, more importantly, to preserve tribal sovereignty, the team persuaded the UFCW to hold an election using the Mashantucket Pequot Labor Relations Law instead of the National Labor Relations Act.
- In January 2009, MLA closed a $142 million project finance deal for Balfour Beatty Communities to design, build, develop, renovate and manage privatized family housing at Lackland Air Force Base in San Antonio, Texas.

== Notable attorneys, professionals, and alumni ==
=== Alumni ===
- Luis A. Aguilar, Democratic commissioner of the U.S. Securities and Exchange Commission in 2008.
- Phillip Carter, Iraq War veteran and former Deputy Assistant Secretary of Defense for Detainee Affairs.
- Stefan Passantino (born 1966), lawyer

=== Attorneys and professionals ===
- Thurbert Baker, former Attorney General of the state of Georgia
- Howard Dean, former Governor of Vermont, Presidential candidate, and Democratic National Committee Chairman, was named a Senior Strategic Advisor on March 5, 2009.
- Randy Evans, former outside counsel to Speakers of the U.S. House of Representatives Newt Gingrich and Dennis Hastert
- Gordon Giffin, US Ambassador to Canada, 1997–2001
- Maryscott (Scotty) Greenwood, specialist in Canada/US relations and a former political appointee in the Clinton Administration
- Sada Jacobson (J.D. 2011), Olympic fencing silver and bronze medalist
- David Skaggs, former Congressman from Colorado from 1987 to 1999, currently serves as a Senior Strategic Advisor and Independent Consultant in the firm's Denver office.
- Eric Tanenblatt, former chief of staff to Georgia Governor Sonny Perdue and longtime advisor to the late US Senator Paul Coverdell
- Anthony A. Williams, fifth mayor of the District of Columbia, served as a Senior Strategic Advisor to the firm

== Rankings ==
- The National Law Journal NLJ 250: 101st largest firm in the United States in 2011.
- The American Lawyer AmLaw 200: 100th largest firm in the United States, by gross revenue ($276.5 million), in 2011.
- The Chambers USA Guide: 12 practice groups and 30 lawyers ranked; 2010 edition.
- Legal Times' "Influence 50": Survey ranked MLA 10th on its law firm list and 14th on its overall list based on 2008 revenues.
- Legal 500: Recommends MLA as a "tier one" firm for mergers and acquisitions work in the South Atlantic region for the second year in a row; 2009.
- Bloomberg Global Legal Advisory Rankings Report: Ranked 2nd in Legal Advisor for Bankruptcy Liquidation league table; 6th in Legal Advisor for Cross Border Announced Deals (by volume) league table; 2nd in Legal Advisor for the Consumer, Cyclical Industry league table; 2nd in Legal Advisor for Canada Announced Deals (by volume) league table.
