= Allan Pilkey =

Canadian politician

The Honourable Allan Pilkey ECO

Ontario MPP
- In office 1990–1995
- Preceded by: Mike Breaugh
- Succeeded by: Jerry Ouellette
- Constituency: Oshawa

Mayor of Oshawa, Ontario
- In office 1980–1990
- Preceded by: James Potticary
- Succeeded by: Allan J. Mason

Alderman, Oshawa City Council
- In office 1969–1980

More...

Personal details
- Born: 1945 (age 80–81) Oshawa, Ontario
- Party: New Democrat
- Spouse: Heather
- Children: 2
- Occupation: Executive assistant

Allan Pilkey (born c. 1945) is a former politician in Ontario, Canada. He served as alderman and mayor of Oshawa, and was a New Democratic Party member of the Legislative Assembly of Ontario from 1990 to 1995.

== Background ==
Pilkey was born in Oshawa, Ontario. He attended O'Neill Collegiate and went on to study business administration at the University of Toronto and Queen's University in Kingston, Ontario. He graduated with a degree in municipal administration.

Pilkey's father, Cliff Pilkey, was also a New Democratic Party Member of Provincial Parliament (MPP) and a prominent organizer for the party. He is married to Heather and they have two children.

== Oshawa alderman and mayor ==
At age 23, Pilkey was elected as an alderman to Oshawa council in late 1968. In 1978, Pilkey challenged Walter Beath for the position of chairman to Durham Regional Council. The council held a vote, the result being a 15–15 tie between Pilkey and Beath. In his position as chairman, Beath voted for himself to break the tie and thus retained the position of chairman.

In 1980, he ran for mayor of Oshawa against the incumbent James Potticary and won. He ran on a platform of bringing more industry to Oshawa. As mayor he also sat on Durham Regional Council. He was acclaimed in the 1982 election, but in 1985 he faced stiff opposition. A ratepayer group called Ward System Now successfully lobbied to change the elect-at-large system for councillors to a ward system, a change that Pilkey opposed. William Longworth, the founder of the group intended to run against Pilkey but in the end he was faced by a rookie, Mary Smith who jumped into the race at the last minute. She said "[she wanted] to give the voters a choice". Pilkey won the election by 16,651 to 7,186 votes. Prior to the election there were four councillors and the mayor. The new council consisted of the mayor, 10 councillors from 10 wards who would also sit on the regional council plus an additional five councillors elected from a combined two wards each. In 1988, he was easily reelected by a 3 to 1 margin over challenger Mike Labaj.

During his time as mayor, Pilkey oversaw a period of economic growth in Oshawa. While this was mirrored generally across the country, Pilkey also managed to reduce debt by controlling municipal budgets through reduced hiring and prudent spending. He had this to say about Oshawa, "People here have a good grasp on reality. Unemployment is low—around 5%—and business is booming. We all agree on one thing: for us to succeed, industry has to succeed."

== Provincial MPP ==
In early 1990 there were rumours that Pilkey would seek the nomination for the federal riding of Oshawa after NDP leader Ed Broadbent announced his retirement. In the end local MPP Mike Breaugh sought and won the nomination.

In the summer of 1990, Pilkey ran as the NDP candidate in the riding of Oshawa. He easily beat his Liberal and Conservative challengers by taking nearly 61% of the votes. Oshawa council appointed councillor Allan Mason to replace him after he resigned as mayor.

The NDP won a majority government in this election under the leadership of Bob Rae, and Pilkey was appointed to cabinet on October 1, 1990, as Minister of Industry, Trade and Technology.

=== Industry, Trade and Technology ===
During his time in this ministry he presided over a time of general downturn in the economy that saw many plant closings and job layoffs. Pilkey was criticised for failing to establish proper communication between the business community and the government. On July 31, 1991, Pilkey was named Solicitor General and Minister of Correctional Services and replaced by the more experienced Ed Philip.

=== Correctional Services ===
Pilkey was involved in a controversy with the Bell Cairn Training Centre for Prison Guards in Hamilton. He was criticised for reacting too slowly to allegations of sexual assault and intimidation of female prison guards at the facility. As a consequence, his role as Minister of Correctional Services was transferred to David Christopherson on September 24, 1992. The allegations were never proven but the centre eventually closed in 1993.

=== Solicitor General ===
One of the first issues that Pilkey confronted was the issue of Sunday shopping. While the party had campaigned for the need for a 'common pause day' which Pilkey said was "not up for negotiation", court case decisions and increasing public demand led to a reversal of this policy. In June 1992, Pilkey tabled amendments to the Retail Business Holidays Act to allow shopping seven days a week except on statutory holidays.

Another contentious issue was the handling of investigations of police conduct by the Special Investigations Unit. The SIU which was set up by the previous Liberal Peterson government was supposed to handle investigations whenever police officers were involved in a shooting. In the spring of 1991 a secret deal was worked out where some police force investigations were allowed to take precedence over the SIU's business. This deal was widely criticised by the public and Pilkey led a drive to rescind the deal in January 1992.

Cuts to the budget of the Ontario Provincial Police also proved to be a problem. The police union stoked fears that the cuts would endanger public safety. This was dismissed as fear-mongering by Pilkey. He said, "I do welcome their suggestions but I really do believe if someone is trying to paint a Draconian, desperate picture, it perhaps is a reach."

Another initiative led to a doubling of the number of native constables on Ontario reserves. The agreement was made between the Indian Commissioner of Ontario, Bud Wildman, the provincial minister responsible for native affairs, Doug Lewis, the federal Solicitor General and several native leaders.

In 1992, two high-profile police shootings of black men in Toronto increased pressure on the government to react. On September 9, 1992, Pilkey announced changes to the Police Act that would be effective January 1, 1993. He said that the use of pepper spray would be allowed by police but that choke holds would be banned. In addition police officers would not be allowed to draw their guns unless threatened by loss of life or serious bodily harm. Also police officers would not be allowed to carry firearms unless they had passed an annual training course in firearms. The most contentious change was that officers would now be required to fill out a report every time they drew their weapons in public.

This led to widespread protests amongst Ontario police forces. Beginning in Toronto, Metro officers started a protest by refusing to issue tickets parking or for minor traffic violations. They also began wearing baseball caps instead of regulation police-issued hats. This protest spread to other police forces across the province until by November 1993, 90% of police forces were involved. On October 28, 1993, 5,000 police officers gathered on the lawn of Queen's Park to protest the changes. This was one of the first legal partisan actions by Ontario police. The protest ended when Pilkey agreed to upgrade the outdated .38 calibre firearms, hire more OPP police officers and negotiate with police union leaders regarding the reporting requirements.

=== Minister without portfolio ===
On February 3, 1993, he was demoted to a minister without portfolio responsible for municipal affairs. He held this position until 1995.

In 1994, The government tabled Bill 167, a bill which would have extended spousal benefits to same-sex couples. Pilkey opposed the bill and did not agree that this was a human rights issue. he said, "I'm not aware under the charter that any human rights are being violated." He criticised CAW leader Buzz Hargrove for supporting the bill. Pilkey claimed that many union members agree with his position to oppose the bill. On June 9, the government held a free vote and the bill was defeated. Pilkey was one of three government ministers to vote against the bill.

The NDP were defeated in the 1995 provincial election, and Pilkey lost the Oshawa riding to Progressive Conservative Jerry Ouellette by over 8,000 votes.

=== Cabinet positions ===
Rae ministry, Province of Ontario (1990–1995)
Cabinet posts (3)
Predecessor	Office	Successor
Mike Farnan	Solicitor General; 1991–1993	David Christopherson
Mike Farnan	Minister of Correctional Services; 1991–1992	David Christopherson
Monte Kwinter	Minister of Industry, Trade and Technology; 1990–1991	Ed Philip

=== Electoral record ===
1990 Ontario general election
Party	Candidate	Votes	%	±%
New Democratic	Allan Pilkey	16,500	60.9	
Liberal	Jim Carlyle	5,124	18.9	
Progressive Conservative	Cliff Fillmore	3,880	14.3	
Confederation of Regions	Gary Jones	1,576	5.8	
Total valid votes		27,080	100.0	
Elections Ontario:

1995 Ontario general election
Party	Candidate	Votes	%	±%
Progressive Conservative	Jerry Ouellette	16,793	54.3	
New Democratic	Allan Pilkey	8,450	27.3	
Liberal	Linda Porritt	5,666	18.3	
Total valid votes		30,909	100.0	
Elections Ontario:

== Later life ==
Pilkey was the assistant to the executive director of administration at the Ontario Workers Health and Safety Centre.
