= Slope (disambiguation) =

Slope or gradient of a line describes its steepness, incline, or grade, in mathematics.

Slope may also refer to:

- Slope landform, a type of landform
- Grade (slope) of a topographic feature or constructed element
- Piste, a marked track for snow skiing or snowboarding
- Roof pitch, a steepness of a roof
- Slope (album), a 2007 album by Steve Jansen
- Slope (ethnic slur), a pejorative for Asian people

== See also ==
- Park Slope, a neighborhood in Brooklyn, New York City
- Slope County, North Dakota
- Slope Mountain (Chigmit Mountains), in Alaska
- Slope rating in golf
- Slope stability
  - Slope stability analysis
- Slop
