= Slop content =

Slop content may refer to...

- Content produced by a content mill
- Overstimulation videos, colloquially referred to as "slop content"
- Friend slop, video game genre
- AI slop, low-quality content produced by AI

== See also ==
- Slop (disambiguation)
