= Canadian American Business Council =

Non-profit organization

- Founded: 1987
- Purpose: International Trade
- Location: Washington, D.C.
- Services: Government advocacy, event organization, trade missions, research
- Key people: Tom Gannon, Chair Pete DePasquale, First Vice-Chair Beth Burke, Chief Executive Officer
- Website: http://www.cabc.co/

The Canadian American Business Council (CABC) is a non-profit, non-partisan, issues-oriented business organization that provides the private sector's perspective in the Canada-U.S. relationship. As of October 2023, the organization is led by CEO Beth Burke.

The Council hosts roundtables with Canadian and U.S. politicians, produces conferences, and recognizes outstanding business leaders with its Corporate Leadership Award. In August 2026, the Canadian American Business Council released a report commissioned from Oxford Economics examining the economic impacts of USMCA and tariffs.

In January, 2022, the Ontario government named Scotty Greenwood, CABC's former CEO, as one of ten members of Premier Doug Ford's Council on U.S. Trade and Industry Competitiveness.

== Board of Directors ==
The following companies are represented on the CABC Board of Directors.

- Air Canada
- Amazon
- Association of Equipment Manufacturers
- Barrick
- Berkshire Hathaway Energy - Canada
- Bombardier Inc.
- CAE
- Capital Power
- Cisco
- CN
- ConocoPhillips
- Creative Theory Agency
- Dow
- Dykema
- Enbridge Inc.
- Expedia Group
- ExxonMobil
- Google
- Inclined
- John Hancock
- Keurig Dr Pepper
- LPL Financial
- Lockheed Martin
- Magna International
- Mastercard
- Motion Picture Association - Canada
- Netflix
- Pfizer
- Price Industries
- Procter & Gamble
- Red Bull
- Rio Tinto
- Shell
- Sun Life
- TD Bank Group
- Walmart

== Annual events ==
=== State of the Relationship ===
The Canadian American Business Council's State of the Relationship Summit (SOTR) is an annual event held in Ottawa, Ontario and serves as the organization's flagship gathering focused on Canada–United States relations.

It brings together senior figures from government, diplomacy, and business to discuss bilateral priorities and economic ties. Past featured guests have included former Canadian Prime Minister Justin Trudeau and Canadian actor and comedian Martin Short, alongside other high-profile leaders and industry executives from both countries.

=== Fall Policy Forum ===
The CABC Fall Policy Forum gathers policymakers, corporate executives, and thought leaders to discuss and shape the economic and political relationship between the U.S. and Canada.

== CABC Corporate Leadership Award ==
The Corporate Leadership Award is awarded to remarkable members of the Canadian-American business community. Past winners include:

- United Technologies Chairman & CEO, Louis Chenevert (2013)
- Campbell's President & CEO, Denise Morrison (2014)
- Coca-Cola Company Chief Sustainability Officer, Bea Perez (2015)
- Janssen Inc. of Johnson & Johnson President, Chris Halyk (2016)
- Rio Tinto Chief Executive, Alf Barrios (2017)
- UPS Chief Corporate Affairs and Communications Officer, Laura Lane (2020)
- Pfizer Chairman and Chief Executive Officer, Albert Bourla, DVM, Ph.D. (2021)
- General Motors Vice President and Head of Public Policy, Omar Vargas (2022)
- Capital Power President & CEO, Avik Day (2024)
