= Jennifer French (politician) =

Canadian politician

Jennifer French MPP
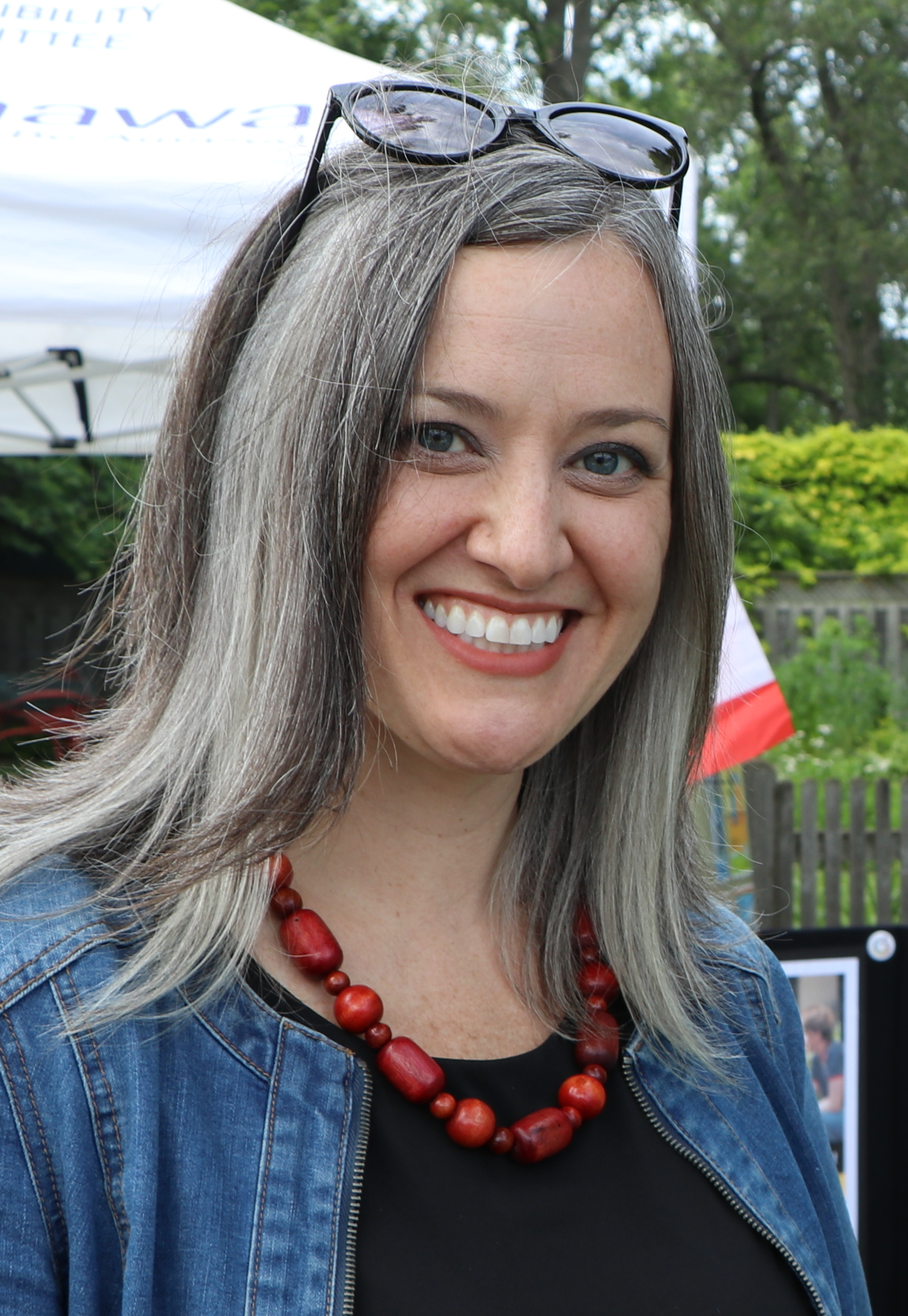
- French in 2022

Critic, Infrastructure, Transportation, and Highways
- Incumbent
- Assumed office August 23, 2018
- Leader: Andrea Horwath and Peter Tabuns (interim)

Critic, Youth Engagement; and Citizenship and Immigration
- In office December 2, 2016 – June 7, 2018
- Leader: Andrea Horwath

Critic, Community Safety and Correctional Services
- In office March 23, 2015 – December 2, 2016
- Leader: Andrea Horwath

Critic, Pensions
- In office June 25, 2014 – March 23, 2015
- Leader: Andrea Horwath

Member of the Ontario Provincial Parliament for Oshawa
- Incumbent
- Assumed office June 12, 2014
- Preceded by: Jerry Ouellette

Personal details
- Born: June 5, 1978 (age 48) Winchester, Ontario
- Party: New Democratic
- Profession: Teacher

Jennifer Kay French (born 1978) is a politician in Ontario, Canada. She is a New Democratic member of the Legislative Assembly of Ontario who was elected in 2014. She represents the riding of Oshawa.

== Background ==
French was born in Winchester, Ontario, near Ottawa. She grew up in the United States after moving there with her family. She returned to Canada to attend Queen's University where she earned a bachelor's degree in biology. She spent three years teaching in Japan before returning to earn a master's degree in science with a teaching specialty. She moved to Oshawa where she spent eight years teaching elementary school.

== Politics ==
French ran in the 2014 provincial election as the New Democratic candidate in the riding of Oshawa. She defeated Progressive Conservative incumbent Jerry Ouellette by 7,692 votes.

She was the party's critic for pension issues, switched to critic for Community Safety and Correctional Services on March 23, 2015, and then to critic of Youth Engagement and critic of Citizenship and Immigration as of December 2, 2016.

French was reelected in the 2018.

In 2018, French tabled a private member's bill; known as Bill 43, Freeing Highways 412 and 418 Act. The bill proposed removing tolls on Ontario Highway 412 and Ontario Highway 418. The bill was not passed by the Legislative Assembly of Ontario, but the government did remove the tolls in February 2022, which French called "a long-overdue victory.".

She was reelected for the second time in the 2022 election.

In April 2022, French called for urgent financial support for Oshawa's Back Door Mission, which offers mental health and addictions support. In June 2023, the provincial government committed $1.1 million dollars in funding for the mission, which Global News attributed to her advocacy on the matter.

As of August 11, 2024, she serves as the Official Opposition critic for Transportation, Infrastructure, and Highways.

== Electoral record ==
2025 Ontario general election: Oshawa
Party	Candidate	Votes	%	±%	Expenditures
New Democratic	Jennifer French	20,367	45.87	+3.80	$102,381
Progressive Conservative	Jerry Ouellette	18,442	41.53	+1.29	$86,427
Liberal	Viresh Bansal	3,891	8.76	–0.37	$16,484
Green	Nicholas Sirgool	916	2.06	–1.96	$0
New Blue	Joe Ingino	644	1.45	–1.01	$0
Independent	Rahul Padmini Soumian	142	0.32	–	$1,150
Total valid votes/expense limit		44,402	99.51	–	$172,568
Total rejected, unmarked and declined ballots		219	0.49	+0.02	
Turnout		44,621	41.63	+2.15	
Eligible voters		107,185			
New Democratic hold		Swing		+1.25	
Source: Elections Ontario

2022 Ontario general election: Oshawa
Party	Candidate	Votes	%	±%
New Democratic	Jennifer French	17,170	42.07	–2.81
Progressive Conservative	Alex Down	16,423	40.24	–1.49
Liberal	Catherine Mosca	3,726	9.13	+1.23
Green	Katarina Dunham	1,641	4.02	+0.41
New Blue	Daryl Janssen	1,006	2.47	–
Ontario Party	Dave Forsythe	843	2.07	–
Total valid votes		40,809	99.52	
Total rejected, unmarked and declined ballots		195	0.48	–0.58
Turnout		41,004	39.48	–15.10
Eligible voters		103,853		
New Democratic hold		Swing		–0.66
Source: Elections Ontario

2018 Ontario general election: Oshawa
Party	Candidate	Votes	%	±%
New Democratic	Jennifer French	24,301	44.88	–0.08
Progressive Conservative	Bob Chapman	22,594	41.73	+10.20
Liberal	Makini Smith	4,278	7.90	–11.55
Green	Deborah Ellis	1,957	3.61	–0.32
Libertarian	Jeannette Gory	523	0.97	–
None of the Above	Cheryl Kelly	490	0.91	–
Total valid votes		54,143	98.95	
Total rejected, unmarked and declined ballots		576	1.05	
Turnout		54,719	54.58	
Eligible voters		100,254		
New Democratic hold		Swing		–5.14
Source: Elections Ontario

2014 Ontario general election: Oshawa
Party	Candidate	Votes	%	±%
New Democratic	Jennifer French	22,227	46.70	+10.52
Progressive Conservative	Jerry Ouellette	14,532	30.53	-11.72
Liberal	Esrick Quintyn	9,052	19.02	+1.53
Green	Becky Smit	1,785	3.75	+1.13
Total valid votes		47,608	100.00	
Total rejected, unmarked and declined ballots		650	1.37	
Turnout		48,258	50.19	
Eligible voters		96,154		
New Democratic gain from Progressive Conservative		Swing		+11.12
Source: Elections Ontario
