= Jerry Ouellette =

Canadian politician

The Honourable Jerry Ouellette ECO
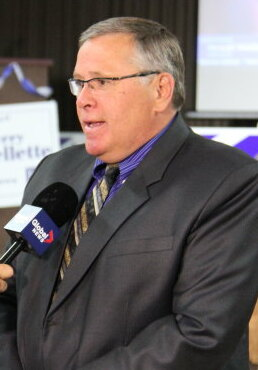
- Ouellette in 2014

Member of the Ontario Provincial Parliament for Oshawa
- In office June 8, 1995 – June 12, 2014
- Preceded by: Allan Pilkey
- Succeeded by: Jennifer French

Personal details
- Born: January 30, 1959 (age 67) Oshawa, Ontario
- Party: Progressive Conservative

Jerry J. Ouellette (born January 30, 1959) is a politician in Ontario, Canada. He was a Progressive Conservative member of the Legislative Assembly of Ontario from 1995 to 2014, representing the riding of Oshawa. He served in the cabinet in the government of Ernie Eves.

== Background ==
Ouellette was born in Oshawa, Ontario. He graduated from Durham College in business administration. He managed a lumber operation and a national consulting firm. Ouellette is a former member of the governing board of Durham College, and a member of the Oshawa Naval Veterans Association. He is currently CEO of Chaga Health and Wellness.

== Politics ==
Ouellette was elected to the Ontario legislature in the provincial election of 1995, defeating incumbent New Democrat Allan Pilkey in Oshawa by about 8,000 votes. He was re-elected by about 7,000 votes over Liberal Chris Topple in the 1999 provincial election, with the NDP falling to third place. He was re-elected in 2003, 2007, and 2011.

Ouellette supported Ernie Eves in the Progressive Conservative Party's 2002 leadership convention, and on April 15, 2002, was appointed Ontario Minister of Natural Resources. In this capacity, he was generally regarded as an ally of the province's fishing and hunting community.

In the 2003 provincial election, Ouellette faced a strong challenge from provincial union representative and NDP candidate Sid Ryan. This was Ryan's third unsuccessful bid for a provincial seat (1999, Scarborough-Centre; 2003 and 2007, Oshawa) and his fifth electoral loss having been twice defeated by Colin Carrie, Oshawa's Conservative candidate and MP, in 2004 and 2006. Ouellette struggled to retain his seat, winning the 2003 race by 1,019 votes. But the Progressive Conservatives lost the election and Ouellette moved to the opposition benches. Four years later, during the 2007 provincial election, Ouellette defeated Ryan a second time. He was re-elected in the 2011 provincial election.

In the 2014 provincial election he was defeated by New Democratic candidate Jennifer French by 7,692 votes.

He ran in the 2025 Ontario election in Oshawa as the Progressive Conservative candidate. He was defeated by New Democrat Jennifer French, who had unseated him in 2014.

== Electoral record ==
2025 Ontario general election: Oshawa
Party	Candidate	Votes	%	±%	Expenditures
New Democratic	Jennifer French	20,367	45.87	+3.80	$102,381
Progressive Conservative	Jerry Ouellette	18,442	41.53	+1.29	$86,427
Liberal	Viresh Bansal	3,891	8.76	–0.37	$16,484
Green	Nicholas Sirgool	916	2.06	–1.96	$0
New Blue	Joe Ingino	644	1.45	–1.02	$0
Independent	Rahul Padmini Soumian	142	0.32	N/A	$1,150
Total valid votes/expense limit		44,402	99.51	-0.01	$172,568
Total rejected, unmarked, and declined ballots		219	0.49	+0.01	
Turnout		44,621	41.79	+2.31	
Eligible voters		106,773			
New Democratic hold		Swing		+1.3	
Source(s): "VOTE TOTALS FROM OFFICIAL TABULATION" (PDF). Elections Ontario. 2 March 2025.

2014 Ontario general election
Party	Candidate	Votes	%	±%
New Democratic	Jennifer French	22,227	46.70	+10.52
Progressive Conservative	Jerry Ouellette	14,532	30.53	-11.72
Liberal	Esrick Quintyn	9,052	19.02	+1.53
Green	Becky Smit	1,785	3.75	+1.13
Total valid votes		47,608	100.00	
Total rejected, unmarked and declined ballots		650	1.37	
Turnout		48,258	50.19	
Eligible voters		96,154		
New Democratic gain from Progressive Conservative		Swing		+11.12
Source: Elections Ontario

2011 Ontario general election
Party	Candidate	Votes	%	±%
Progressive Conservative	Jerry Ouellette	16,719	42.25	+3.23
New Democratic	Mike Shields	14,316	36.18	+3.26
Liberal	Jacquie Menezes	6,921	17.49	-3.91
Green	Stacey Leadbetter	1,035	2.62	-3.42
Libertarian	Matthew Belanger	435	1.10	
Freedom	Ben Fudge	147	0.37	
Total valid votes		39,573	100.00	
Total rejected, unmarked and declined ballots		162	0.41	
Turnout		39,735	44.26	
Eligible voters		93,679		
Progressive Conservative hold		Swing		-0.02
Source: Elections Ontario

2007 Ontario general election
Party	Candidate	Votes	%	±%
Progressive Conservative	Jerry Ouellette	15,977	39.02	+1.7
New Democratic	Sid Ryan	13,482	32.92	-1.79
Liberal	Faelyne Templer	8,762	21.40	-2.64
Green	Alexander Kemp	2,474	6.04	+4.41
Family Coalition	Jeffrey Streutker	253	0.62	-0.36
Total valid votes		40,948	100.0	

2003 Ontario general election
Party	Candidate	Votes	%	±%
Progressive Conservative	Jerry Ouellette	14,566	37.32	-9.43
New Democratic	Sid Ryan	13,547	34.71	+12.09
Liberal	Chris Topple	9,383	24.04	-4.98
Green	Karen Tweedle	636	1.63	
Freedom	Paul McKeever	518	1.33	
Family Coalition	Dale Chilvers	383	0.98	
Total valid votes		39,033	100.0	

1999 Ontario general election
Party	Candidate	Votes	%
Progressive Conservative	Jerry Ouellette	18,915	46.75
Liberal	Chris Topple	11,740	29.02
New Democratic	Colleen Twomey	9,154	22.62
Natural Law	Garry Kotack	651	1.61
Total valid votes		40,460	100.0

=== Cabinet positions ===
Eves ministry, Province of Ontario (2002–2003)
Cabinet post (1)
Predecessor	Office	Successor
John Snobelen	Minister of Natural Resources; 2002–2003	David Ramsay
