= 1990 Oshawa federal by-election =

← 1988	August 13, 1990	1993 →

Riding of Oshawa
	First party	Second party
	NDP	LIB
Candidate	Michael Breaugh	Cathy O'Flynn
Party	New Democratic	Liberal
Popular vote	12,046	8,709
Percentage	47.59%	34.40%
	Third party	Fourth party
	PC	CHP
Candidate	Bill Longworth	Gerry Van Schepen
Party	Progressive Conservative	Christian Heritage
Popular vote	1,627	1,308
Percentage	6.43%	5.17%
MP before election
Ed Broadbent
New Democratic
Elected MP
Michael Breaugh
New Democratic

A by-election was held in the federal riding of Oshawa in Ontario on August 13, 1990, following the resignation of Leader of the New Democratic Party Ed Broadbent.

The by-election was held on the same day as another by-election in Laurier—Sainte-Marie in Quebec. The seat was held for the NDP by Michael Breaugh.

In the 1993 federal election, Breaugh lost his seat to Liberal Ivan Grose like all NDP MPs in the province.

== Results ==
Canadian federal by-election, 13 August 1990 2 January 1990 resignation of Ed Broadbent
Party	Candidate	Votes	%	±%
New Democratic	Michael Breaugh	12,046	47.6	+3.3
Liberal	Cathy O'Flynn	8,709	34.4	+13.9
Progressive Conservative	Bill Longworth	1,627	6.4	-27.4
Christian Heritage	Gerry Van Schepen	1,308	5.2	
Confederation of Regions	Garnet Chesebrough	1,024	4.0	
Green	David A.J. Hubbell	243	1.0	
Libertarian	George Dance	117	0.5	-0.6
Social Credit	Ken Campbell	96	0.4	
Independent	Robert Bob Kirk	94	0.4	
Independent	John Turmel	50	0.2	
Total valid votes		25,314	100.0	
New Democratic hold		Swing		-5.3

== 1988 result ==
1988 Canadian federal election
Party	Candidate	Votes	%	±%
New Democratic	Ed Broadbent	18,410	44.3	+2.0
Progressive Conservative	Nancy McLean	14,040	33.8	-5.0
Liberal	Ed White	8,496	20.5	+2.4
Libertarian	George S. Kozaroff	449	1.1	+0.5
Commonwealth of Canada	Lucylle Boikoff	139	0.3	+0.2
Total valid votes		41,534	100.0	
