= Michael Breaugh =

Canadian politician (1942–2019)

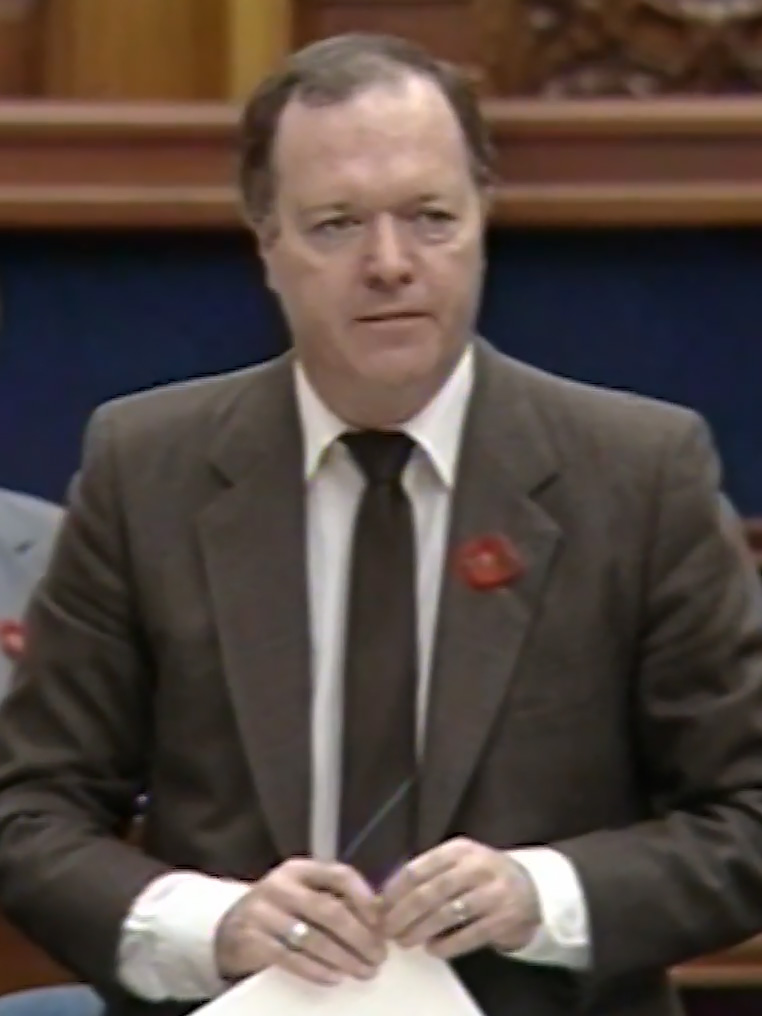
- Breaugh in 1987

Member of Parliament for Oshawa
- In office 1990–1993
- Preceded by: Ed Broadbent
- Succeeded by: Ivan Grose

MPP
- In office 1975–1990
- Preceded by: Charles McIlveen
- Succeeded by: Allan Pilkey
- Constituency: Oshawa

Personal details
- Born: September 13, 1942 Kingston, Ontario, Canada
- Died: November 22, 2019 (aged 77) Oshawa, Ontario, Canada
- Party: New Democrat; Ontario New Democrat
- Spouse: Andrea Todkill
- Children: 2
- Occupation: Teacher

Michael James Breaugh (September 13, 1942 – November 22, 2019) was a Canadian politician. He served in the Legislative Assembly of Ontario from 1975 to 1990, and in the House of Commons of Canada from a 1990 by-election until 1993.

== Background ==
Breaugh was one of four sons of Thomas Breaugh and Marion Rush; his brothers were Harold, Patrick, and Tom. He was educated at Peterborough Teachers' College, Queen's University, and the University of Toronto. A teacher by training, he served as an executive of the Ontario English Catholic Teachers Association.

== Politics ==
He was first elected to public office in the 1975 Ontario election. A New Democrat, he won an easy victory in the working-class riding of Oshawa, while the NDP became the principal legislative opposition to the long-established Progressive Conservative government. He was re-elected in the 1977 election.

The NDP had seemed poised for an electoral breakthrough in 1977, but instead fell from second to third-place status in the legislature. When Stephen Lewis stepped down as Ontario NDP leader in 1978, Breaugh ran to succeed him. He received 499 votes at the 1978 NDP leadership convention, finishing a strong third in a field of three candidates. Most of his supporters went to Michael Cassidy rather than presumed frontrunner Ian Deans on the second ballot, giving Cassidy a narrow victory.

Breaugh was re-elected in the 1981 election, though by a narrower margin than before.

Breaugh had a poor relationship with Bob Rae, who succeeded Cassidy as party leader in 1982. The NDP experienced a modest recovery under Rae in the 1985 provincial election, and Breaugh was again re-elected by a significant margin in Oshawa. In the 1987 election, he defeated Liberal candidate Cathy O'Flynn by the reduced margin of 2,916 votes as the Liberals won a landslide provincial majority.

Breaugh often clashed with Rae in the 1980s, criticising his leadership. In 1990, he left Queen's Park and ran for a seat in the House of Commons of Canada, in a by-election called in the federal Oshawa riding to fill the vacancy caused by the resignation of former federal NDP leader Ed Broadbent. Breaugh again defeated O'Flynn, now running for the Liberal Party of Canada, to win the by-election, which was held on August 13, a month before the 1990 Ontario election that brought Rae's NDP to power.

Rae's government was largely responsible for Breaugh's defeat at the polls in 1993. The provincial NDP had by this time lost much of its support from organized labour, through austerity legislation known as the Social Contract. This had a detrimental effect on the federal NDP, which lost all ten of its Ontario seats in the 1993 federal election. Breaugh was unseated being reduced to a fourth-place finish in Oshawa, where the local branch of the Canadian Auto Workers had previously disaffiliated from the NDP.

He supported Howard Hampton as leader of the Ontario NDP in 1996.

Breaugh died on November 22, 2019.
