= Scotty Greenwood =

American government relations executive

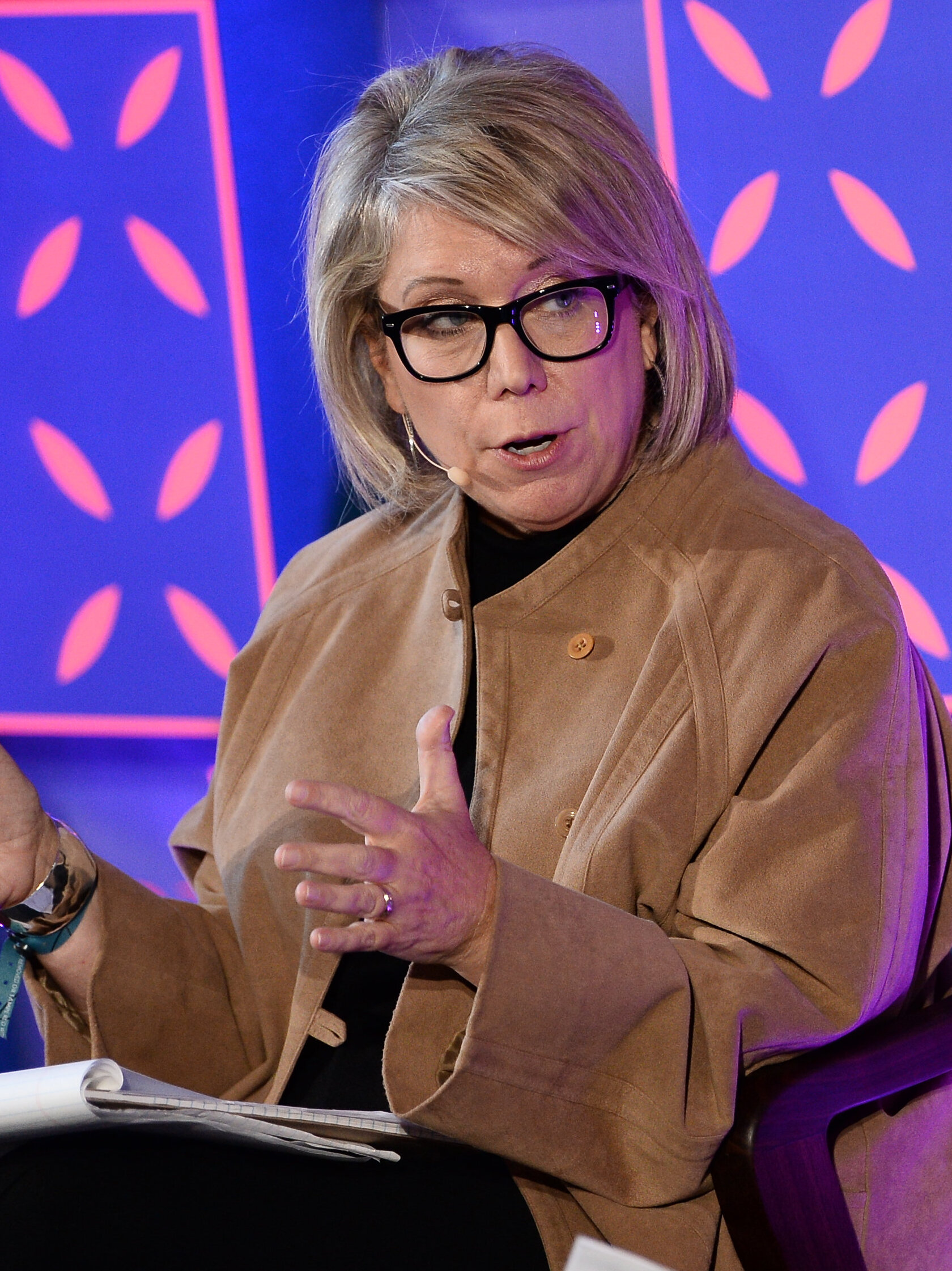
Scotty Greenwood moderates a panel discussion at Web Summit in Lisbon, Portugal. (2017)

Maryscott "Scotty" Greenwood is an American government relations executive and an expert in Canada/U.S. relations. In 2026 she re-launched Ottawa Street Strategy, a government relations and geopolitical risk consulting firm. Greenwood is a contributor to the SAGE Canada community on Substack where she appears on the SAGE podcast. She is also a Senior Fellow at the Munk School of Global Affairs & Public Policy at the University of Toronto.

Greenwood is a former political appointee in the Clinton administration who previously held the position of partner in Crestview Strategy US LLC and the chief executive officer of the Canadian-American Business Council. Greenwood is an advocate for free trade and a frequent commentator on trade issues. On May 15, 2023, Greenwood testified before the Committee on International Trade of the House of Commons in Ottawa, Canada, on trade regulation. Greenwood was previously a Principal at Dentons, and recognized by the Hill Times in 2014 and 2022 as one of the Top 100 People Influencing Canadian Foreign Policy. She was also named one of the Top 50 influencing Canada’s foreign policy in 2021 and 2023. She was also listed as one of the top 30 consultant lobbyists in the Hill Times in 2023. On May 26, 2015, Greenwood appeared before the House of Commons Standing Committee on Foreign Affairs and International Development as part of its study of the 2015 North American Leaders Summit. On March 16, 2021, Greenwood appeared before the House of Commons Special Committee on the Economic Relationship between Canada and the United States.

On August 16, 2021 Greenwood was presented with the Founder's Memorial Award from the Pacific NorthWest Economic Region at the 2021 Annual Summit in Big Sky, Montana. In January, 2022, the Ontario government named her as one of ten members of Premier Doug Ford's Council on U.S. Trade and Industry Competitiveness. In March 2022, The Hill Times named Greenwood one of the top 50 people influencing Canada’s foreign policy.

Previously, Greenwood held the position of Chief of Staff to former United States Ambassador to Canada, Gordon Giffin and from 2023-2026 was global head of government relations for Manulife, based in Ontario.

In March 2022, Greenwood, Arthur Milnes, and Scott Reid release the second edition of With Faith and Goodwill: Chronicling the Canada-U.S. Friendship, published by Dundurn Press. The book showcases the words and deeds of prime ministers, presidents, and others, from Sir John A. Macdonald to Joseph R. Biden, Jr. With rare photographs and long-forgotten treasures, this book looks back at a shared history and those who changed its course.

== Current activities ==
- Founder, Ottawa Street Strategy
- Senior Fellow, Munk School of Global Affairs & Public Policy, University of Toronto
- Board of directors, Foundation for Art and Preservation in Embassies
- Board of directors, World Affairs Council of Washington, DC
- Board of directors, McKenna Long & Aldridge Foundation
- Advisory board, G(irls)20 Summit
- Chief executive officer, Canadian American Business Council
- Member, Premier’s Council on U.S. Trade and Industry Competitiveness
- Partner, Crestview Strategy US LLC
- Working Group Member, The George W. Bush Institute – SMU Economic Growth Initiative, North America Working Group
- Managing Director (Secretariat), Exponent
- Board of Directors, Future Borders Coalition

== Popular media ==
Regular appearances in Canadian and U.S. media outlets as an authority on Canada/U.S. relations.

- National Newswatch
- CBC News
- CTV News Channel
- National Newswatch
- National Post
- The Globe and Mail
- Toronto Star
- The Current with Matt Galloway
- CBC News
- CTV News Channel
- The Globe and Mail
- iPolitics
- Maclean's
- Toronto Star
- The Washington Post
- C-SPAN
- Dotcom Magazine
- The Hill Times
