= Luce, Forward, Hamilton & Scripps =

Law firm in California

- Headquarters: San Diego, CA
- No. of offices: 6 before merger
- No. of attorneys: 200+ before the merger
- No. of employees: 500 (estimate)
- Major practice areas: Full Service Law Firm
- Key people: Kurt Kicklighter (Managing Partner)
- Revenue: $110 million USD (2008)
- Date founded: 1873
- Founder: Moses A. Luce, Thomas M. Hamilton and F. Tudor Scripps
- Company type: Limited liability partnership
- Dissolved: 2012 — merged with McKenna Long & Aldridge
- Website: luce.com

Luce, Forward, Hamilton & Scripps LLP or Luce Forward, founded in 1873, was a law firm headquartered in San Diego, California. On March 6, 2012, it combined its practices with McKenna Long & Aldridge, with the combined firm taking the name McKenna Long & Aldridge LLP. The firm's better-known alumni included former San Diego Mayor Dick Murphy.

== Size ==
With $110 million in annual revenue, Luce Forward was one of the largest law firms in the U.S. in terms of revenue.

Luce Forward had over 200 attorneys in six offices. The total number of employees was approximately 500. In terms of the number of attorneys, Luce Forward was one of the largest law firms in the state of California.

== History ==
- 1873 — The firm was founded in San Diego by Congressional Medal of Honor recipient Moses A. Luce.
- 1889 — Charter for the City of San Diego drafted by firm is adopted.
- 1924 - Charles H. Forward joins the firm.
- 1967 — Partner E. Miles Harvey represents USS Pueblo Commander Lloyd Bucher.
- 1972 — Firm advises Republican National Committee to move its convention to Miami after reviewing questionable offers from donor ITT Corporation.
- 1994 — The firm opened its Los Angeles and San Francisco offices.
- 2009 — Partner Kathy A. Jorrie represents concert promoter AEG Live in connection with Michael Jackson comeback tour and film before singer's untimely death.
- 2012 — The firm merged with McKenna Long & Aldridge LLP.

== Locations ==
Luce Forward had six offices:

- San Diego (1873) (headquarters)
- Los Angeles (1994)
- San Francisco (1994)
- Carmel Valley (2001)
- Rancho Santa Fe (2006)
- Orange County (2007)

Former firm offices no longer in operation include:

- New York City
- Century City

== Recognition and rankings ==
In 2011, 27 Luce Forward attorneys were listed in Best Lawyers in America. In the 2008 edition of Chambers USA, Luce Forward received top honors for its Family Wealth and Exempt Organizations practice group.
