= Albert Walker (Ontario politician) =

Canadian politician

Ab Walker

Ontario MPP
- In office 1963–1967
- Preceded by: Tommy Thomas
- Succeeded by: Cliff Pilkey
- Constituency: Oshawa

Personal details
- Born: October 12, 1910; England, United Kingdom
- Died: August 10, 2001 (aged 90); Oshawa, Ontario, Canada
- Political party: Progressive Conservative

Albert Victor "Ab" Walker (October 12, 1910 – August 10, 2001) was a Canadian politician, who represented Oshawa in the Legislative Assembly of Ontario from 1963 to 1967 as a Progressive Conservative member.

== Political Offices ==
Walker first entered politics as an Alderman in Oshawa, Ontario in 1956. He served on municipal council from 1956 to 1963. While still an Alderman, Walker ran as the PC candidate in the 1963 provincial general election, where he defeated the NDP incumbent, Tommy Thomas.

During the 27th Legislative Assembly, Walker served as a backbench member of the majority PC government led by Premier John Robarts. While Walker did not serve in Cabinet, he was active on an average of seven Standing Committees of the Legislature during his term in office. In the 1967 provincial general election, Walker lost to the NDP candidate, and former colleague on Oshawa City Council, Cliff Pilkey.

He died on August 10, 2001.
