= Oshawa (provincial electoral district) =

Provincial electoral district in Ontario, Canada

Coordinates: 43.9009°N 78.8454°W

Ontario electoral district
- Oshawa in relation to other Greater Toronto Area districts

Provincial electoral district
- Legislature: Legislative Assembly of Ontario
MPP
Jennifer French
New Democratic
- First contested: 1955
- Last contested: 2025

Demographics
- Population (2016): 126,765
- Electors (2018): 100,254
- Area (km²): 64
- Pop. density (per km²): 1,980.7
- Census division: Durham
- Census subdivision: Oshawa

Oshawa is a provincial electoral district in Ontario, Canada, that has been represented in the Legislative Assembly of Ontario since 1955.

== History ==
In 2015 the provincial districts were updated, and Oshawa gained parts of the city which were previously part of the electoral district of Whitby-Oshawa. The 2018 provincial election was the first in which the new borders were used. The new borders include most of the actual city of Oshawa, although it excludes the mostly rural areas from Wards 4, 6, and 7 north of Taunton Road. These northern parts are part of the Durham electoral district.

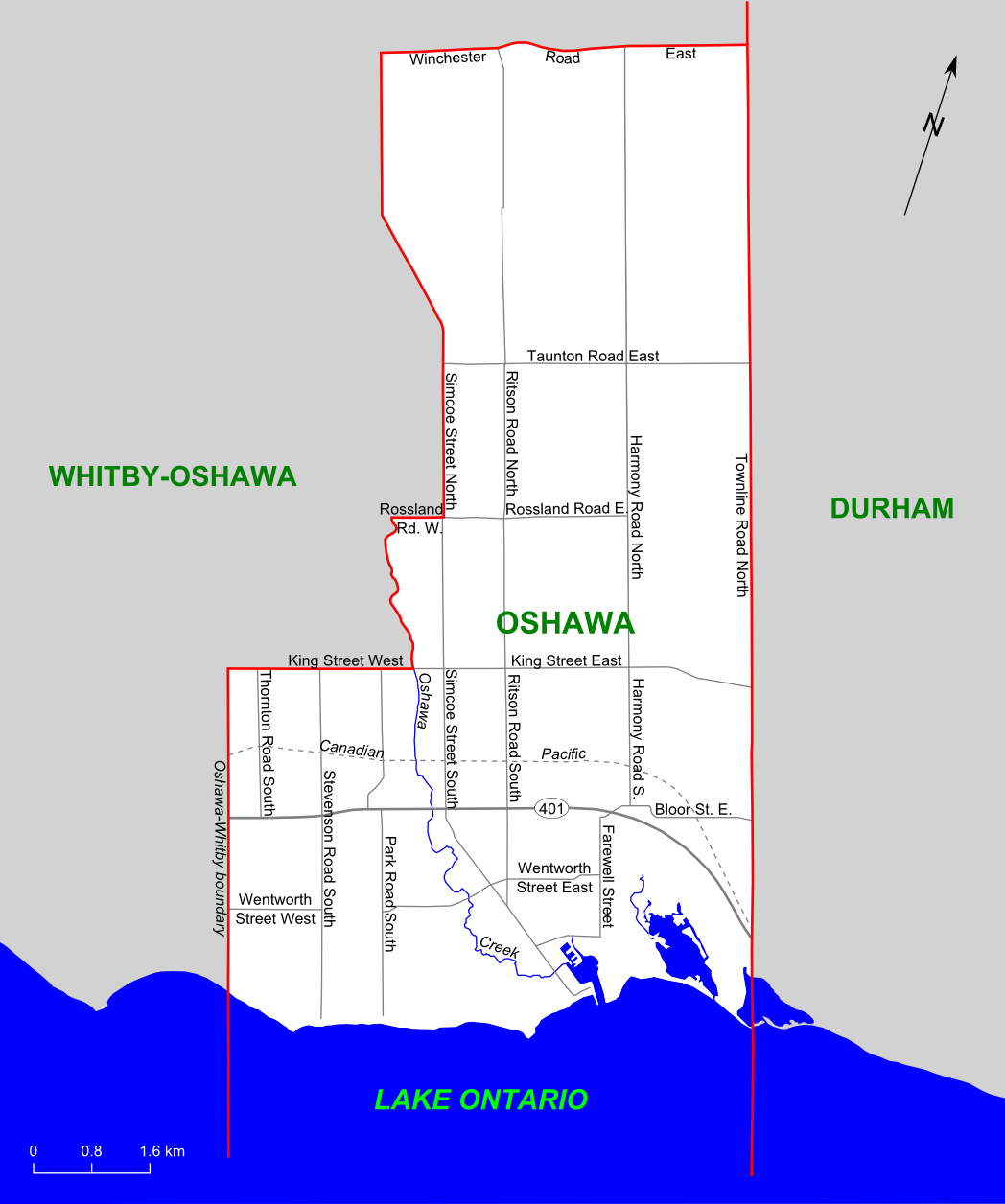
Previous electoral district of Oshawa, which excluded the north-western parts of the city.

Previously the district of Oshawa consisted of the southern and eastern parts of the city of Oshawa south and east of a line drawn from west to east along King Street West, north along Oshawa Creek, east along Rossland Road West, north along Simcoe Street North and east along Winchester Road East. The riding includes the communities of Kedron and Taunton and the eastern part of North Oshawa. In 1999, provincial ridings were defined to have the same borders as federal ridings. The federal district was also re-mapped to include the north-western sections.

== Demographics ==
2017 estimates; figures derived from Canada 2016 Census:

- Population: 167,965 (159,458 in 2016 census)
- Average individual income: $46,627
- Median individual income: $36,268
- Average household income: $89,788
- Median household income: $71,225
- With Canadian citizenship: 163,768 (97.6%)
- With citizenship other than Canadian: 4,196 (2.4%)
- Immigrated between 2000 and 2005: 2,297
- Immigrated between 2006 and 2011: 1,671
- Immigrated after 2012: 1,765
- Born in province of residence: 125,439
- Born outside province of residence: 16,417
- English only: 156,167 (92.9%)
- English and French: 10,775 (6.4%)
- French only: 188
- Neither English nor French: 834

== Members of Provincial Parliament ==
Oshawa
| Assembly | Years | Member | Party |
|---|---|---|---|
Riding created from Ontario
| 25th | 1955–1963 | T. D. Thomas | Co-operative Commonwealth |
| 26th | 1959–1963 | T. D. Thomas | Co-operative Commonwealth |
| 27th | 1963–1967 | Albert Walker | Progressive Conservative |
| 28th | 1967–1971 | Cliff Pilkey | New Democratic |
| 29th | 1971–1975 | Charles McIlveen | Progressive Conservative |
| 30th | 1975–1977 | Michael Breaugh | New Democratic |
| 31st | 1977–1981 | Michael Breaugh | New Democratic |
| 32nd | 1981–1985 | Michael Breaugh | New Democratic |
| 33rd | 1985–1987 | Michael Breaugh | New Democratic |
| 34th | 1987–1990 | Michael Breaugh | New Democratic |
| 35th | 1990–1995 | Allan Pilkey | New Democratic |
| 36th | 1995–1999 | Jerry Ouellette | Progressive Conservative |
| 37th | 1999–2003 | Jerry Ouellette | Progressive Conservative |
| 38th | 2003–2007 | Jerry Ouellette | Progressive Conservative |
| 39th | 2007–2011 | Jerry Ouellette | Progressive Conservative |
| 40th | 2011–2014 | Jerry Ouellette | Progressive Conservative |
| 41st | 2014–2018 | Jennifer French | New Democratic |
| 42nd | 2018–2022 | Jennifer French | New Democratic |
| 43rd | 2022–2025 | Jennifer French | New Democratic |
| 44th | 2025–present | Jennifer French | New Democratic |

== Election results ==
Winning party in each polling division of Oshawa at the 2025 Ontario general election

2025 Ontario general election
| Party | Candidate | Votes | % | ±% | Expenditures |
|---|---|---|---|---|---|
| New Democratic | Jennifer French | 20,367 | 45.87 | +3.80 | $102,381 |
| Progressive Conservative | Jerry Ouellette | 18,442 | 41.53 | +1.29 | $86,427 |
| Liberal | Viresh Bansal | 3,891 | 8.76 | –0.37 | $16,484 |
| Green | Nicholas Sirgool | 916 | 2.06 | –1.96 | $0 |
| New Blue | Joe Ingino | 644 | 1.45 | –1.01 | $0 |
| Independent | Rahul Padmini Soumian | 142 | 0.32 | – | $1,150 |
| Total valid votes/expense limit | | 44,402 | 99.51 | – | $172,568 |
| Total rejected, unmarked and declined ballots | | 219 | 0.49 | +0.02 | |
| Turnout | | 44,621 | 41.63 | +2.15 | |
| Eligible voters | | 107,185 | | | |
| New Democratic hold | | Swing | | +1.25 | |
Source: Elections Ontario

Winning party in each polling division of Oshawa at the 2022 Ontario general election

2022 Ontario general election
| Party | Candidate | Votes | % | ±% |
|---|---|---|---|---|
| New Democratic | Jennifer French | 17,170 | 42.07 | –2.81 |
| Progressive Conservative | Alex Down | 16,423 | 40.24 | –1.49 |
| Liberal | Catherine Mosca | 3,726 | 9.13 | +1.23 |
| Green | Katarina Dunham | 1,641 | 4.02 | +0.41 |
| New Blue | Daryl Janssen | 1,006 | 2.47 | – |
| Ontario Party | Dave Forsythe | 843 | 2.07 | – |
| Total valid votes | | 40,809 | 99.52 | |
| Total rejected, unmarked and declined ballots | | 195 | 0.48 | –0.58 |
| Turnout | | 41,004 | 39.48 | –15.10 |
| Eligible voters | | 103,853 | | |
| New Democratic hold | | Swing | | –0.66 |
Source: Elections Ontario

2018 Ontario general election
| Party | Candidate | Votes | % | ±% |
|---|---|---|---|---|
| New Democratic | Jennifer French | 24,301 | 44.88 | –0.08 |
| Progressive Conservative | Bob Chapman | 22,594 | 41.73 | +10.20 |
| Liberal | Makini Smith | 4,278 | 7.90 | –11.55 |
| Green | Deborah Ellis | 1,957 | 3.61 | –0.32 |
| Libertarian | Jeannette Gory | 523 | 0.97 | – |
| None of the Above | Cheryl Kelly | 490 | 0.91 | – |
| Total valid votes | | 54,143 | 98.95 | |
| Total rejected, unmarked and declined ballots | | 576 | 1.05 | |
| Turnout | | 54,719 | 54.58 | |
| Eligible voters | | 100,254 | | |
| New Democratic hold | | Swing | | –5.14 |
Source: Elections Ontario

2014 general election redistributed results
| Party | Vote | % |
|---|---|---|
| New Democratic | 21,850 | 44.96 |
| Progressive Conservative | 15,323 | 31.53 |
| Liberal | 9,454 | 19.45 |
| Green | 1,910 | 3.93 |
| Freedom | 58 | 0.12 |

2014 Ontario general election
| Party | Candidate | Votes | % | ±% |
|---|---|---|---|---|
| New Democratic | Jennifer French | 22,232 | 46.70 | +10.52 |
| Progressive Conservative | Jerry Ouellette | 14,540 | 30.54 | –11.71 |
| Liberal | Esrick Quintyn | 9,051 | 19.01 | +1.52 |
| Green | Becky Smit | 1,785 | 3.75 | +1.13 |
| Total valid votes | | 47,608 | 98.65 | |
| Total rejected, unmarked and declined ballots | | 650 | 1.35 | +0.94 |
| Turnout | | 48,258 | 50.19 | +5.92 |
| Eligible voters | | 96,154 | | |
| New Democratic gain from Progressive Conservative | | Swing | | +11.11 |
Source: Elections Ontario

2011 Ontario general election
| Party | Candidate | Votes | % | ±% |
|---|---|---|---|---|
| Progressive Conservative | Jerry Ouellette | 16,719 | 42.25 | +3.23 |
| New Democratic | Mike Shields | 14,316 | 36.18 | +3.25 |
| Liberal | Jacquie Menezes | 6,921 | 17.49 | –3.91 |
| Green | Stacey Leadbetter | 1,035 | 2.62 | –3.43 |
| Libertarian | Matthew Belanger | 435 | 1.10 | – |
| Freedom | Ben Fudge | 147 | 0.37 | – |
| Total valid votes | | 39,573 | 99.59 | |
| Total rejected, unmarked and declined ballots | | 162 | 0.41 | –0.31 |
| Turnout | | 39,735 | 44.26 | –4.67 |
| Eligible voters | | 89,767 | | |
| Progressive Conservative hold | | Swing | | –0.01 |
Source: Elections Ontario

2007 Ontario general election
| Party | Candidate | Votes | % | ±% |
|---|---|---|---|---|
| Progressive Conservative | Jerry Ouellette | 15,977 | 39.02 | +1.70 |
| New Democratic | Sid Ryan | 13,482 | 32.92 | –1.78 |
| Liberal | Faelyne Templer | 8,762 | 21.40 | –2.64 |
| Green | Alexander Kemp | 2,474 | 6.04 | +4.41 |
| Family Coalition | Jeffrey Streutker | 253 | 0.62 | –0.36 |
| Total valid votes | | 40,948 | 99.28 | |
| Total rejected, unmarked and declined ballots | | 296 | 0.72 | –0.11 |
| Turnout | | 41,244 | 48.94 | –2.53 |
| Eligible voters | | 84,283 | | |
| Progressive Conservative hold | | Swing | | +1.74 |
Source: Elections Ontario

2003 Ontario general election
| Party | Candidate | Votes | % | ±% |
|---|---|---|---|---|
| Progressive Conservative | Jerry Ouellette | 14,566 | 37.32 | –9.43 |
| New Democratic | Sid Ryan | 13,547 | 34.71 | +12.08 |
| Liberal | Chris Topple | 9,383 | 24.04 | –4.98 |
| Green | Karen Tweedle | 636 | 1.63 | – |
| Freedom | Paul McKeever | 518 | 1.33 | – |
| Family Coalition | Dale Chilvers | 383 | 0.98 | – |
| Total valid votes | | 39,033 | 99.17 | |
| Total rejected, unmarked and declined ballots | | 327 | 0.83 | –0.09 |
| Turnout | | 39,360 | 51.46 | –0.94 |
| Eligible voters | | 76,480 | | |
| Progressive Conservative hold | | Swing | | –10.76 |
Source: Elections Ontario

1999 Ontario general election
| Party | Candidate | Votes | % | ±% |
|---|---|---|---|---|
| Progressive Conservative | Jerry Ouellette | 18,915 | 46.75 | –7.58 |
| Liberal | Chris Topple | 11,740 | 29.02 | +10.69 |
| New Democratic | Colleen Twomey | 9,154 | 22.62 | –4.71 |
| Natural Law | Garry Kotack | 651 | 1.61 | – |
| Total valid votes | | 40,460 | 99.08 | |
| Total rejected, unmarked and declined ballots | | 377 | 0.92 | –0.01 |
| Turnout | | 40,837 | 52.40 | –5.26 |
| Eligible voters | | 77,928 | | |
| Progressive Conservative hold | | Swing | | –9.13 |
Source: Elections Ontario

1995 Ontario general election
| Party | Candidate | Votes | % | ±% |
|---|---|---|---|---|
| Progressive Conservative | Jerry Ouellette | 16,793 | 54.33 | +40.08 |
| New Democratic | Allan Pilkey | 8,450 | 27.34 | –33.76 |
| Liberal | Linda Porritt | 5,666 | 18.33 | –0.50 |
| Total valid votes | | 30,909 | 99.06 | |
| Total rejected, unmarked and declined ballots | | 292 | 0.94 | –0.50 |
| Turnout | | 31,201 | 57.66 | +5.67 |
| Eligible voters | | 54,110 | | |
| Progressive Conservative gain from New Democratic | | Swing | | +20.29 |
Source: Elections Ontario

1990 Ontario general election
| Party | Candidate | Votes | % | ±% |
|---|---|---|---|---|
| New Democratic | Allan Pilkey | 16,601 | 61.09 | +15.24 |
| Liberal | Jim Carlyle | 5,116 | 18.83 | –16.71 |
| Progressive Conservative | Cliff Fillmore | 3,871 | 14.25 | –0.18 |
| Confederation of Regions | Gary Jones | 1,585 | 5.83 | – |
| Total valid votes | | 27,173 | 98.56 | |
| Total rejected, unmarked and declined ballots | | 396 | 1.44 | +1.02 |
| Turnout | | 27,569 | 51.99 | –2.01 |
| Eligible voters | | 53,028 | | |
| New Democratic hold | | Swing | | +15.97 |
Source: Elections Ontario

1987 Ontario general election
| Party | Candidate | Votes | % | ±% |
|---|---|---|---|---|
| New Democratic | Michael Breaugh | 12,957 | 45.85 | –4.39 |
| Liberal | Cathy O'Flynn | 10,041 | 35.53 | +15.60 |
| Progressive Conservative | Frank Snyder | 4,076 | 14.42 | –15.39 |
| Family Coalition | James Delaney | 1,184 | 4.19 | – |
| Total valid votes | | 28,258 | 99.58 | |
| Total rejected ballots | | 118 | 0.42 | –0.18 |
| Turnout | | 28,376 | 54.00 | –0.64 |
| Eligible voters | | 52,548 | | |
| New Democratic hold | | Swing | | –9.99 |
Source: Elections Ontario

1985 Ontario general election
| Party | Candidate | Votes | % | ±% |
|---|---|---|---|---|
| New Democratic | Michael Breaugh | 12,686 | 50.25 | +2.20 |
| Progressive Conservative | Bob Boychyn | 7,528 | 29.82 | –6.71 |
| Liberal | Joe Neal | 5,034 | 19.94 | +4.51 |
| Total valid votes | | 25,248 | 99.40 | |
| Total rejected ballots | | 152 | 0.60 | +0.23 |
| Turnout | | 25,400 | 54.64 | +5.04 |
| Eligible voters | | 46,485 | | |
| New Democratic hold | | Swing | | +4.46 |
Source: Elections Ontario

1981 Ontario general election
| Party | Candidate | Votes | % | ±% |
|---|---|---|---|---|
| New Democratic | Michael Breaugh | 10,307 | 48.04 | –5.19 |
| Progressive Conservative | Bob Boychyn | 7,836 | 36.52 | +8.17 |
| Liberal | Ivan B. Wallace | 3,311 | 15.43 | –2.12 |
| Total valid votes | | 21,454 | 99.63 | |
| Total rejected ballots | | 80 | 0.37 | +0.07 |
| Turnout | | 21,534 | 49.60 | –6.42 |
| Eligible voters | | 43,415 | | |
| New Democratic hold | | Swing | | –6.68 |
Source: Elections Ontario

1977 Ontario general election
| Party | Candidate | Votes | % | ±% |
|---|---|---|---|---|
| New Democratic | Michael Breaugh | 12,226 | 53.23 | –5.71 |
| Progressive Conservative | John Snedden | 6,512 | 28.35 | +0.77 |
| Liberal | Ivan B. Wallace | 4,032 | 17.55 | +4.66 |
| Communist | Russell Rak | 199 | 0.87 | +0.28 |
| Total valid votes | | 22,969 | 99.70 | |
| Total rejected ballots | | 69 | 0.30 | –0.13 |
| Turnout | | 23,038 | 56.02 | –7.19 |
| Eligible voters | | 41,124 | | |
| New Democratic hold | | Swing | | –3.24 |
Source: Elections Ontario

1975 Ontario general election
| Party | Candidate | Votes | % | ±% |
|---|---|---|---|---|
| New Democratic | Michael Breaugh | 14,638 | 58.94 | +18.84 |
| Progressive Conservative | Alan DeWar | 6,851 | 27.58 | –19.15 |
| Liberal | William Menzies | 3,202 | 12.89 | –0.28 |
| Communist | Lynn Rak | 146 | 0.59 | – |
| Total valid votes | | 24,837 | 99.57 | |
| Total rejected ballots | | 108 | 0.43 | –0.05 |
| Turnout | | 24,945 | 63.21 | –11.78 |
| Eligible voters | | 39,463 | | |
| New Democratic gain from Progressive Conservative | | Swing | | +18.99 |
Source: Elections Ontario

1971 Ontario general election
| Party | Candidate | Votes | % | ±% |
|---|---|---|---|---|
| Progressive Conservative | Charles McIlveen | 19,207 | 46.73 | +9.85 |
| New Democratic | Cliff Pilkey | 16,481 | 40.10 | –3.69 |
| Liberal | Mike Lisko | 5,413 | 13.17 | –6.17 |
| Total valid votes | | 41,101 | 99.52 | |
| Total rejected ballots | | 200 | 0.48 | –0.56 |
| Turnout | | 41,301 | 74.99 | +4.97 |
| Eligible voters | | 55,078 | | |
| Progressive Conservative gain from New Democratic | | Swing | | +6.77 |
Source: Elections Ontario

1967 Ontario general election
| Party | Candidate | Votes | % | ±% |
|---|---|---|---|---|
| New Democratic | Cliff Pilkey | 13,182 | 43.79 | +4.67 |
| Progressive Conservative | Albert Walker | 11,102 | 36.88 | –4.58 |
| Liberal | James Potticary | 5,821 | 19.34 | –0.10 |
| Total valid votes | | 30,105 | 98.95 | |
| Total rejected ballots | | 318 | 1.05 | +0.01 |
| Turnout | | 30,423 | 70.02 | +10.95 |
| Eligible voters | | 43,450 | | |
| New Democratic gain from Progressive Conservative | | Swing | | +4.63 |
Source: Elections Ontario

1963 Ontario general election
| Party | Candidate | Votes | % | ±% |
|---|---|---|---|---|
| Progressive Conservative | Albert Walker | 12,077 | 41.45 | +6.03 |
| New Democratic | Tommy Thomas | 11,395 | 39.11 | –2.87 |
| Liberal | Frances Jones | 5,662 | 19.43 | –3.16 |
| Total valid votes | | 29,134 | 98.96 | |
| Total rejected ballots | | 305 | 1.04 | –0.10 |
| Turnout | | 29,439 | 59.07 | +2.20 |
| Eligible voters | | 49,838 | | |
| Progressive Conservative gain from Co-operative Commonwealth | | Swing | | +4.45 |
Source: Elections Ontario

1959 Ontario general election
| Party | Candidate | Votes | % | ±% |
|---|---|---|---|---|
| Co-operative Commonwealth | Tommy Thomas | 10,243 | 41.98 | +0.82 |
| Progressive Conservative | Bill Newman | 8,643 | 35.42 | +4.71 |
| Liberal | George K. Drynan | 5,513 | 22.60 | –4.35 |
| Total valid votes | | 24,399 | 98.87 | |
| Total rejected ballots | | 280 | 1.13 | –0.09 |
| Turnout | | 24,679 | 56.87 | –4.94 |
| Eligible voters | | 43,399 | | |
| Co-operative Commonwealth hold | | Swing | | –1.94 |
Source: Elections Ontario

1955 Ontario general election
| Party | Candidate | Votes | % |
|---|---|---|---|
| Co-operative Commonwealth | Tommy Thomas | 9,114 | 41.16 |
| Progressive Conservative | Hayden Macdonald | 6,801 | 30.72 |
| Liberal | William Lawson | 5,966 | 26.94 |
| Labor–Progressive | Wilfred Duffield | 261 | 1.18 |
| Total valid votes | | 22,142 | 98.77 |
| Total rejected ballots | | 275 | 1.23 |
| Turnout | | 22,417 | 61.80 |
| Eligible voters | | 36,273 | |
| Co-operative Commonwealth pickup new district. | | | |
Source: Elections Ontario

== 2007 electoral reform referendum ==
2007 Ontario electoral reform referendum
| Side | Votes | % |
|---|---|---|
| First Past the Post | 25,559 | 64.1 |
| Mixed member proportional | 14,305 | 35.9 |
| Total valid votes | 39,864 | 100.0 |

== See also ==
- List of Ontario provincial electoral districts
- Canadian provincial electoral districts
