= Cliff Pilkey =

Canadian politician

MPP for Oshawa
- In office 1967–1971
- Preceded by: Albert Walker
- Succeeded by: Charles McIlveen

Personal details
- Born: 27 July 1922 Oshawa, Ontario
- Died: 17 November 2012 (aged 90) Ajax, Ontario
- Party: New Democrat

Clifford George (Cliff) Pilkey (27 July 1922 – 17 November 2012) was a Canadian politician and trade union leader.

Pilkey was an autoworker and United Auto Workers leader in Oshawa's Local 222 before being elected as an Alderman on Oshawa City Council. First elected in 1963, he served as an Alderman until the end of 1966.

Pilkey was then elected to the Ontario legislature as the NDP MPP for Oshawa in the 1967 provincial election defeating a former fellow Alderman, Albert Walker. He served one term before being defeated in the 1971 provincial election.

In 1976, he was elected president of the Ontario Federation of Labour. He retired from the OFL in 1986.

Pilkey was given a Centennial Medal of Canada in 1967, was invested with the Order of Ontario on 11 April 1990 and received the Queen Elizabeth II Diamond Jubilee Medal on 18 June 2012.

His son, Allan Pilkey, was NDP MPP for Oshawa from 1990 to 1995.

Cliff Pilkey died in hospital in Ajax, Ontario on 17 November 2012, aged 90, after a long illness.
