= Charles McIlveen =

Canadian politician

Charles Elmer McIlveen
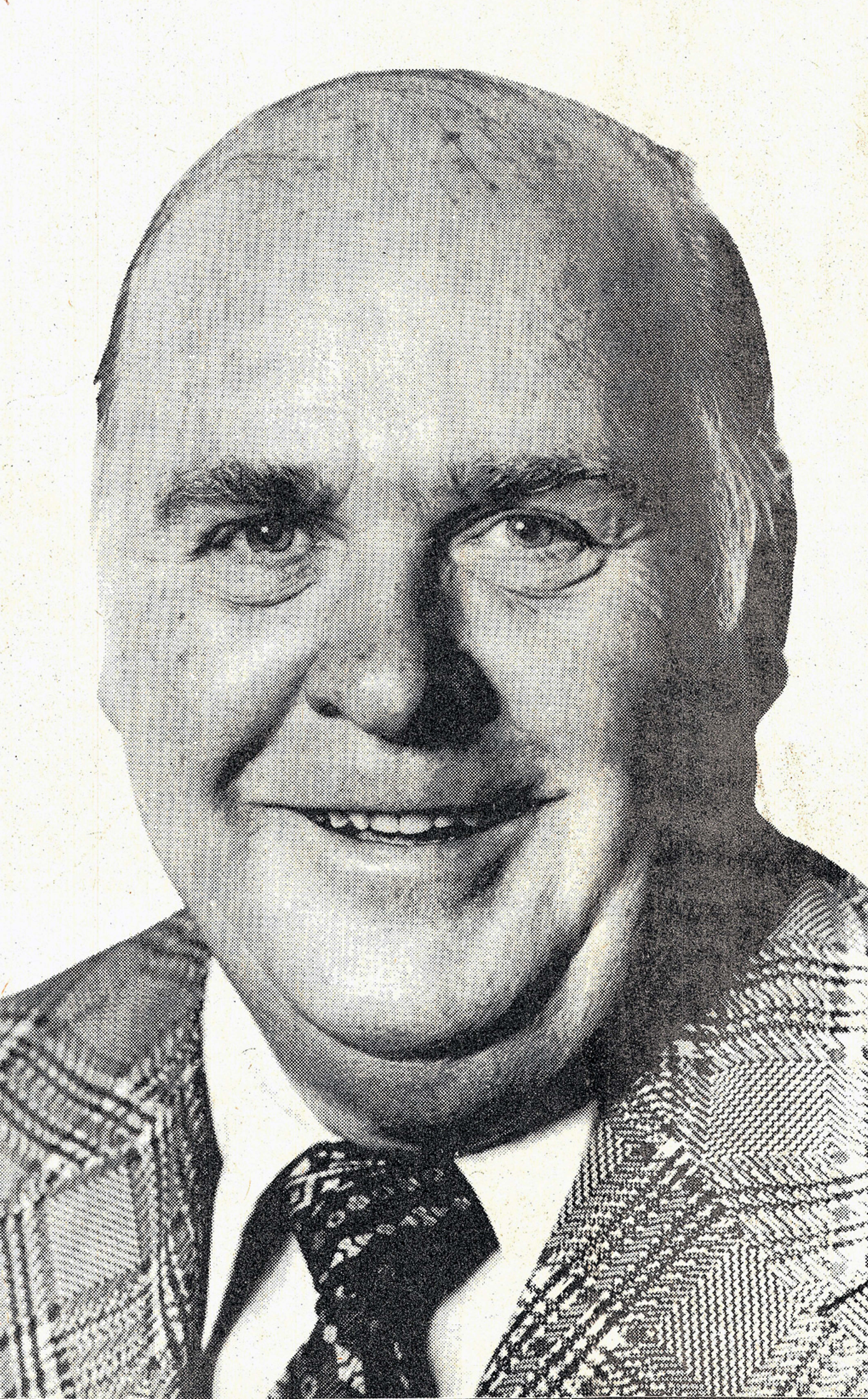
- McIlveen, c. 1975

MPP for Oshawa
- In office October 21, 1971 – September 17, 1975
- Preceded by: Cliff Pilkey
- Succeeded by: Michael Breaugh

Personal details
- Born: August 8, 1919 Auburn, Ontario
- Died: May 4, 2007 (aged 87) Oshawa, Ontario
- Party: Progressive Conservative

Charles Elmer McIlveen (August 8, 1919 – May 4, 2007) was a Canadian physician and politician, who represented Oshawa in the Legislative Assembly of Ontario from 1971 to 1975 as a Progressive Conservative member. McIlveen was elected in the PC sweep, taking the seat for the working-class riding of Oshawa previously held by Cliff Pilkey and considered an NDP stronghold. In addition to serving as a member, or Chair, of several Standing and Select Committees of the Legislature, McIlveen served as the Parliamentary Assistant to the Minister of Transportation and Communication during the short-lived government of Bill Davis in 1975.

In the 1975 Ontario election, New Democrat Michael Breaugh easily reclaimed the seat.

A physician by profession, McIlveen died May 4, 2007, at the age of 87.
