= Slope Mountain (Chigmit Mountains) =

Mountain in Alaska, United States

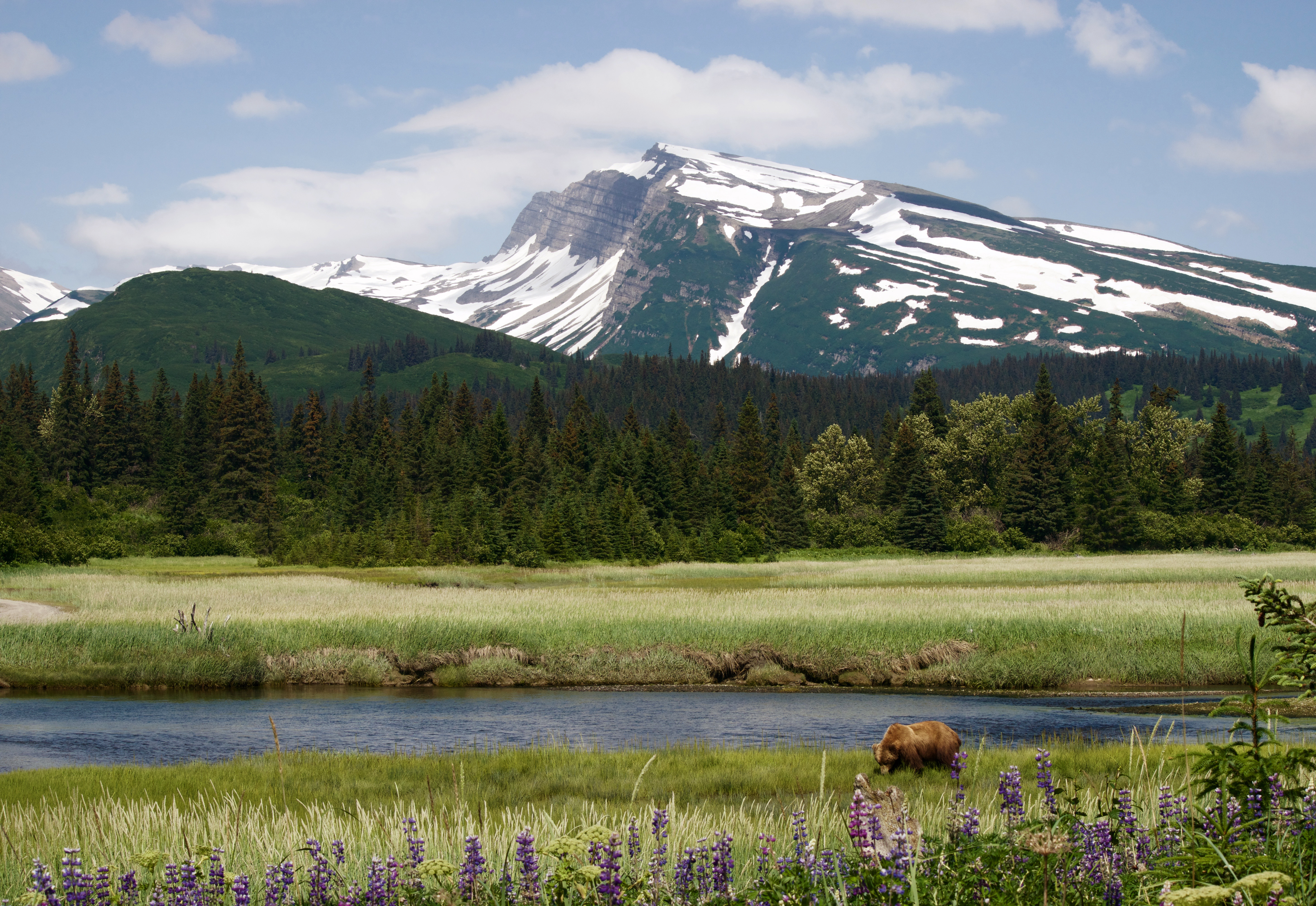
- Southwest aspect

Highest point
- Elevation: 3,800 ft (1,158 m)
- Prominence: 3,200 ft (975 m)
- Parent peak: Peak 4250
- Isolation: 10.91 mi (17.56 km)
- Coordinates: 60°03′56″N 152°38′58″W

Geography
- Location within Alaska
- Interactive map of Slope Mountain
- Country: United States
- State: Alaska
- Borough: Kenai Peninsula Borough
- Protected area: Lake Clark National Park
- Parent range: Chigmit Mountains; Aleutian Range
- Topo map: USGS Kenai A-8

Slope Mountain is a 3,800-foot (1,158 m) summit in the US state of Alaska.

== Description ==
Slope Mountain is located in the Chigmit Mountains of the Aleutian Range. It is set along the west shore of Cook Inlet and within Lake Clark National Park and Preserve. The mountain is situated 115 miles (185 km) southwest of Anchorage, 58 miles (93 km) southwest of Kenai, and 15 miles (24 km) east of Mount Iliamna volcano. Precipitation runoff from the mountain drains into Johnson River and Cook Inlet. Although modest in elevation, topographic relief is significant as the summit rises up from tidewater in 2.5 mi (4 km). The mountain's local descriptive name was reported in 1910 by G. C. Martin, U.S. Geological Survey, and the toponym has been officially adopted by the U.S. Board on Geographic Names.

== Climate ==
Based on the Köppen climate classification, Slope Mountain is located in a subarctic climate zone, with long, cold, snowy winters, and cool summers. Winter temperatures can drop below 0 °F with wind chill factors below −10 °F. The months May through June offer the most favorable weather for viewing or climbing the peak.

== Gallery ==
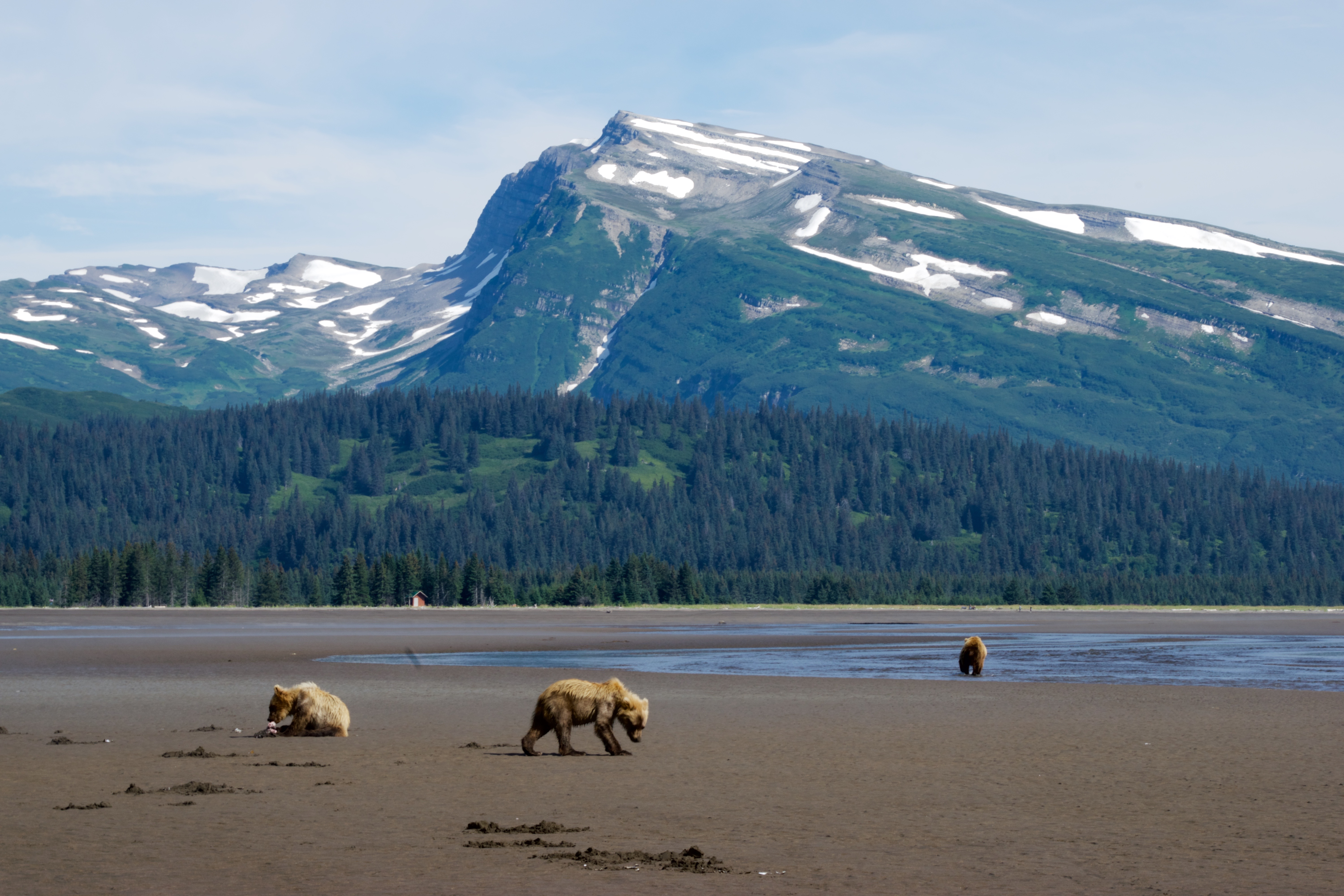
South aspect

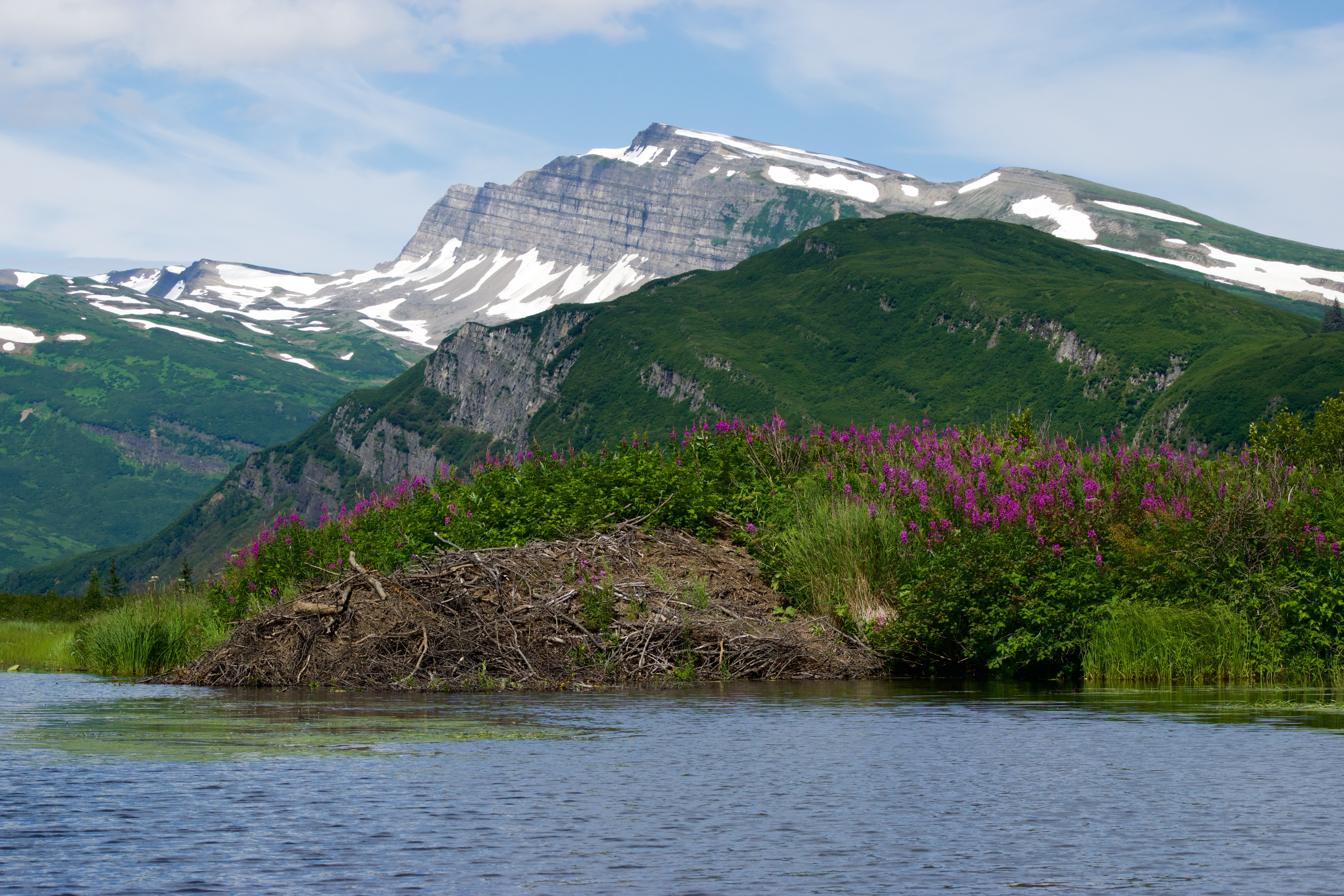
Southwest aspect

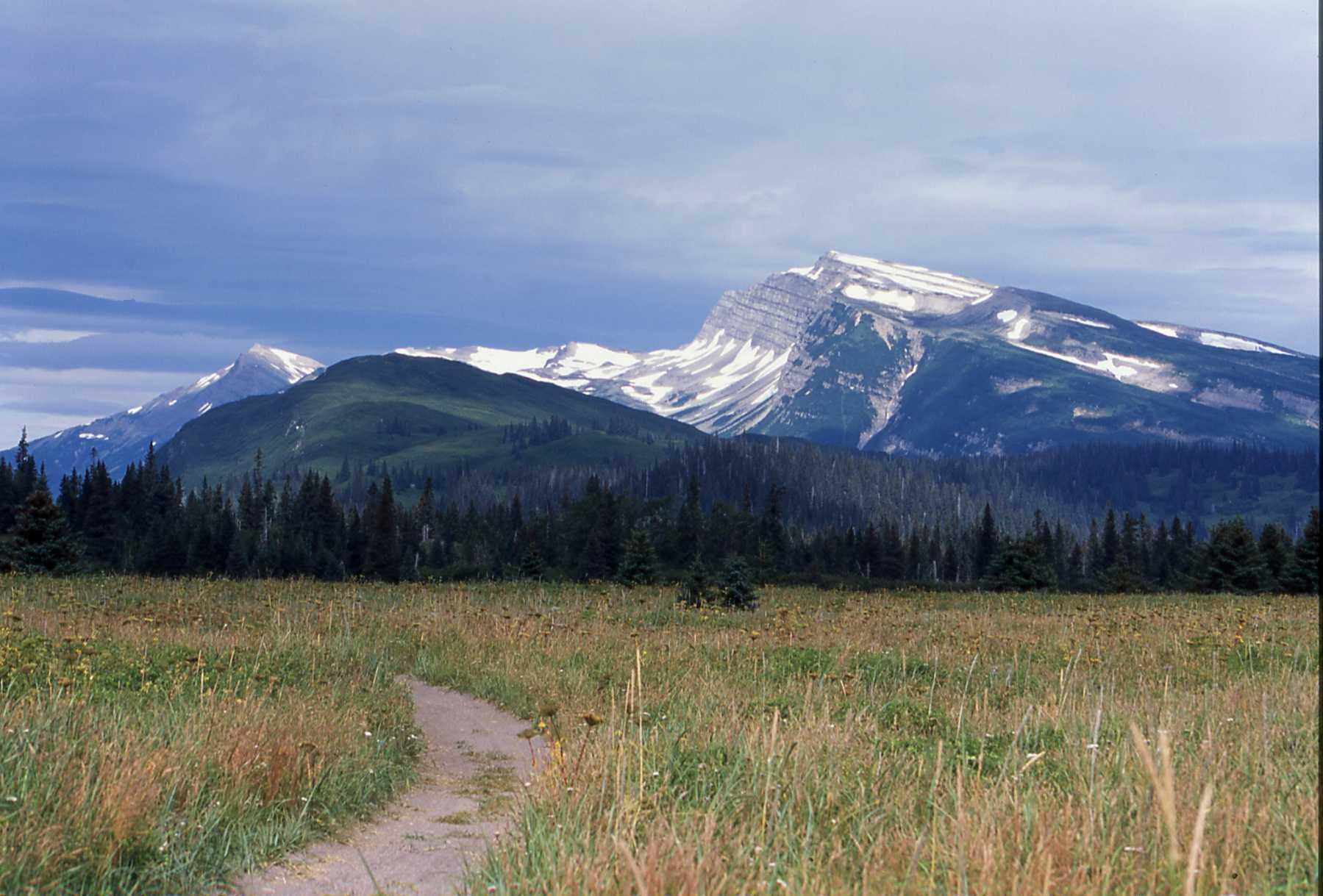
Southwest aspect

== See also ==
- Geography of Alaska
