= Moses A. Luce =

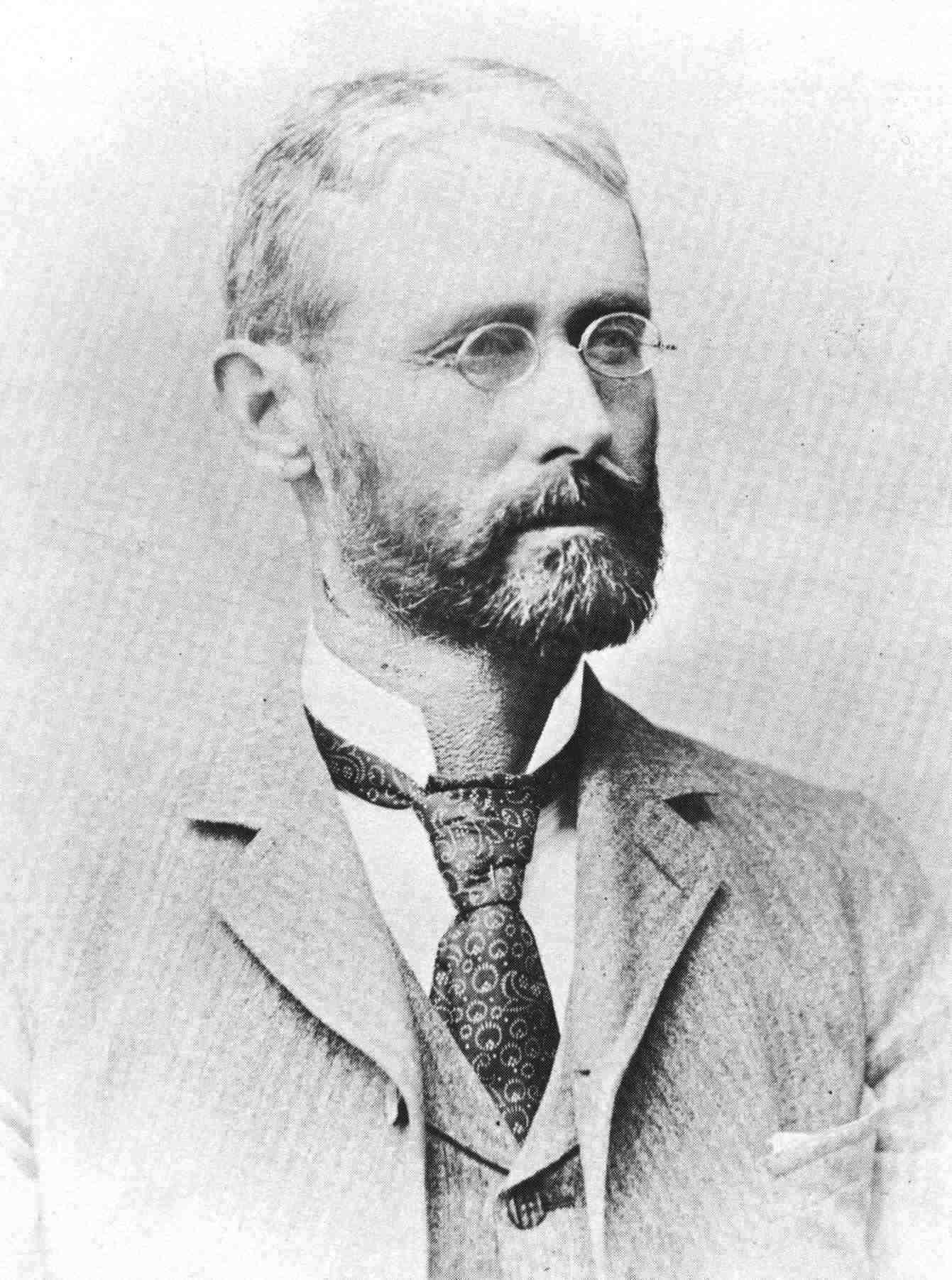
- Moses A. Luce
- Born: May 14, 1842; Payson, Adams County, Illinois
- Died: April 13, 1933 (aged 90)
- Military career
- Allegiance: United States of America; Union
- Branch: United States Army; Union Army
- Service years: 1861–1864
- Rank: Sergeant
- Units: Company E, 4th Michigan Volunteer Infantry Regiment
- Conflicts: American Civil War
- Awards: Medal of Honor

Moses Augustine Luce (May 14, 1842 – April 13, 1933) was a Sergeant in the Union Army and a Medal of Honor recipient for his actions in the American Civil War. He went on to become a leading lawyer, judge and businessman in early San Diego, where he founded the prominent law firm Luce, Forward, Hamilton & Scripps.

== Background ==
Luce was born 14 May 1842 in Payson, Illinois, to Christopher Sanborn Luce and Sarah Pottle. Through his father, he is descended from the Luce family of Rhode Island, making him a distant cousin of Adm. Stephen Bleecker Luce (founder of the US Naval War College) and Henry Robinson Luce, (founder of Time Magazine) and former Michigan Gov. Cyrus Gray Luce, who were descendants of Henry Luce of Martha's Vineyard. Former US Secretary of State William Henry Seward was a 3x great grandson of Henry Luce. Henry Luce was born around 1640. He lived next to William Pabodie in Tisbury, Dukes County, Massachusetts. He was a near neighbor of Joseph Daggett and Issac Robinson. Grace Baker Luce shared a kinship with Rev. John Robinson, a minister in Leiden, Netherlands. Rev. John Robinson was minister of the Mayflower Pilgrims. William Pabodie was a father-in-law of John Alden. See Rev. Abishai Alden history in Willington, Connecticut. Rev. Alden succeeded Rev. Gideon Noble, a 3x great grandfather Mary White Terry, an ancestor of the Kellogg family of Battle Creek, Michigan. The Kellogg estate was purchased by Michigan realtor Harry C. Peet, granduncle of Key West, Florida, research historian John Gibson Parker 111, a protege of Prof. Raymond Blazevic, an early Florida Keys history specialist. Prof. Blazevic was from Duluth, Minnesota, home of Marion Elizabeth Cogdon, granddaughter of Walter Bannister Congdon, the wealthiest man in Minnesota. Congdon was associated with the John D. Rockefeller and Andrew Carnegie. Carnegie's brother rebuilt the old plantation house at Dungeness Plantation on Cumberland Island of the coast of Georgia, near Savannah. Dungeness was formerly owned by Mrs. Gen. Nathaniel Greene, who served as a nursemaid to Gen. Robert E. Lee's father, who died a Dungeness Plantation.

Andrew Carnegie's chief attorney was Elihu Root, a cousin of Henry Robinson Luce, founder of Time Magazine. Nathan Thornburgh, a native of Key West, Florida was a senior editor at Time Magazine.

Rev. Abishai Alden shared a kinship with Barnabas and Elizabeth Patterson, aunt and uncle of Key West mayor Col. Alexander Patterson of Stonington, Connecticut. Barnabas Alden's son in law was Robert Smith, brother of Hannah Smith Kellogg, grandmother of Dr. Joseph Kellogg of Battle Creek, Michigan.

He joined the army in Hillsdale, Michigan, in June 1861, and was mustered out in June 1864.

== Medal of Honor citation ==
Rank and organization: Sergeant, Company E, 4th Michigan Infantry. Place and date: At Laurel Hill, Va., May 10, 1864. Entered service at: Hillsdale, Michigan. Born: May 14, 1842, Payson, Adams County, Ill. Date of issue: February 7, 1895.

Citation:

Voluntarily returned in the face of the advancing enemy to the assistance of a wounded and helpless comrade, and carried him, at imminent peril, to a place of safety.

== Education and post-Civil War career ==
After serving with distinction in the Civil War, Moses studied at Hillsdale College and then the Albany Law School, where he graduated LL.B. 1867. At first he practised at Bushnell, Illinois, but in 1873 he migrated to San Diego.

In San Diego he helped found the leading legal firm of Luce, Forward, Kunzel & Scripps. He went on to become a leading player in business life in the growing city, in particular serving on the boards of several railroads and mining companies. He was instrumental in the founding of the Californian Southern Railroad, connecting San Diego to the Santa Fe Railroad.

He helped draft the San Diego city charter and was active in Republican politics, attending two Republican Party national conventions and a number of Californian state conventions. From 1875 to 1880 he was a judge of the County Court of San Diego. For several decades he served as President of the Board of Trustees of the First Unitarian Church of San Diego, and was also a prominent Mason. From 1898 to 1911, he was in partnership with William A. Sloane, who would go on to serve on the California Supreme Court.

Luce retired from business in 1922, at the age of 80. He died April 13, 1933, and was buried in Greenwood Memorial Park in San Diego.

== Family ==
In 1870, Moses married Adelaide Mantania, daughter of John D. and Olive (Head) Mantania, by whom he had six children, including three who survived to adulthood, Grace, Mary and Edgar A. Luce, Sr. His son Edgar Augustine Luce, Sr. (1881–1958) graduated Sanford University in 1905 and went on to become a senior partner of Luce, Forward, Kunzel & Scripps and judge of the Superior Court of San Diego Co; he was also a Californian State Senator from 1914 to 1918. A son of Edgar Sr., Edgar A. Luce, Jr., graduated from Stanford in 1948 and became a managing partner in Luce, Forward, Kunzel & Scripps.

A grandson of Moses Luce was Gordon C. Luce of La Jolla, who became President (1969) and later Chairman and CEO (1979) of the San Diego Federal Savings & Loan (later the Great American First Savings Bank), a company Moses Luce had been the attorney for. Gordon Luce served under Ronald Reagan, first as a member of his cabinet when Reagan was Governor of California, and subsequently as a member of the President's Foreign Intelligence Advisory Board (1988–90). Gordon Luce has also had a career as a director or advisor to a number of companies. In 1964 he was a delegate to the Republican National Congress (alternate), and in 1972 served as a presidential elector from California.

== See also ==
- List of Medal of Honor recipients
- List of American Civil War Medal of Honor recipients: G–L
