= Inclining test =

Test to determine stability, lightship weight, and center of gravity of a ship

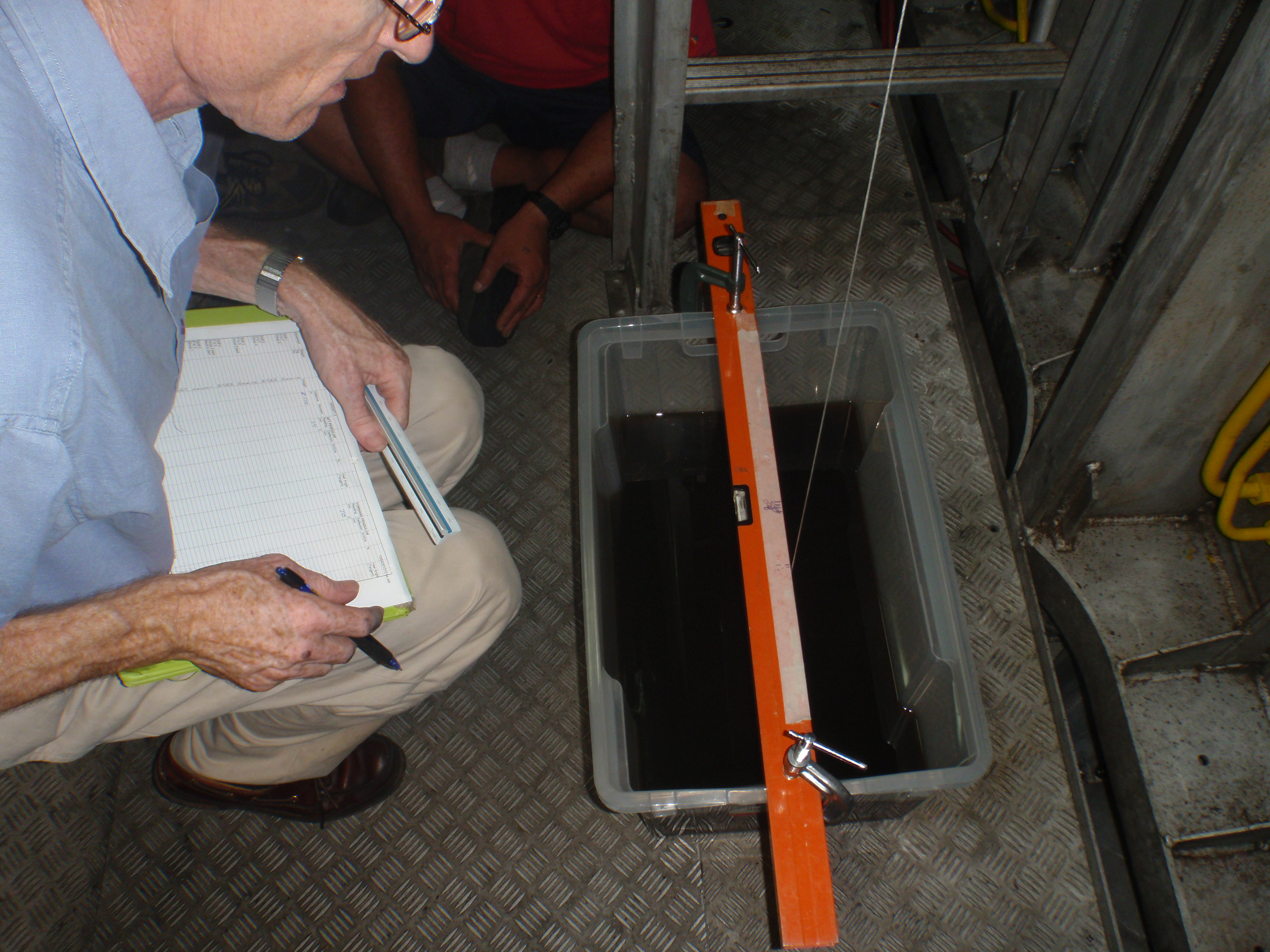
A naval architect measuring the transverse displacement of a pendulum during a stability experiment

An inclining test is a test performed on a ship to determine its stability, lightship weight and the coordinates of its center of gravity. The test is applied to newly constructed ships greater than 24 metres (79 ft) in length, and to ships altered in ways that could affect stability. Inclining test procedures are specified by the International Maritime Organization and other international associations.

The weight of a vessel can be readily determined by reading draughts and comparing with the known hydrostatic properties. The metacentric height (GM), which dominates stability, can be estimated from the design, but an accurate value must be determined by an inclining test.

The inclining test is usually done inshore in calm weather, in still water, and free of mooring restraints to achieve accuracy. The GM position is determined by moving weights transversely to produce a known overturning moment in the range of 1-4 degrees if possible. Knowing the restoring properties (buoyancy) of the vessel from its dimensions and floating position and measuring the equilibrium angle of the weighted vessel, the GM can be calculated.

As in a new ship test, the weight shifts have to be known and the angles of list measured. A series of weight (ballast) movements are used to obtain an average and variance for GM.

== See also ==
- Metacentric height
- Naval architecture
- Semi-submersible
