= Slop =

Slop or SLOP may refer to:

== Arts and entertainment ==
- Jan Janz Slop (1643–1727), Dutch painter
- Doctor Slop, a character in the 1759 novel Tristram Shandy

== Clothing ==
- Slop (clothing), historical term of ready-to-wear or secondhand garments of low quality
- Hose (clothing), loose men's tights

== Technology ==
- AI slop, low-quality content made with artificial intelligence
- Strategic lateral offset procedure, in aircraft navigation
- Backlash (engineering), clearance between gears
- Slop, crude oil washing residue
- Slop (search algorithms), search algorithm parameter

== Other uses ==
- Household food scraps fed to animals
- Animal feed for pigs
- Goyslop, an antisemitic term for mass produced products
- Friendslop, a video game genre
- Self-selecting opinion poll
- Special Operations (in military slang)
