= Pitblado =

Pitblado is a surname. Notable people with the surname include:

- David Pitblado (1912–1997), Principal Private Secretary to the office of the Prime Minister of the United Kingdom
- Edward Pitblado (1896–1977), British-Canadian ice hockey player
- Euphemia Wilson Pitblado (1849–1928), Scottish-born American activist, social reformer
