= Dykema =

Dykema is a surname. Notable people with the surname include:

- Carolyn Dykema (born 1967), American politician
- Craig Dykema (born 1959), American basketball player
- Peter W. Dykema (1873–1951), American music educator
