= Inclination (disambiguation) =

Inclination is the angle between a reference plane and the orbital plane.

Inclination may also refer to:

== Science ==
- Slope, tilt, steepness, or angle from horizontal of a line (in mathematics and geometry)
- Axial tilt, also known as equatorial inclination
- Grade (slope), the tilt of a topographic feature (hillside, etc.) or constructed element (road, etc.)
- Depression angle, part of a spherical coordinate system

== Literature ==
- Inclination (ethics), an examination of desire in the context of moral worthiness
- "Inclination" (novella), a science fiction novella by William Shunn
