= Ed Broadbent =

Canadian politician and political scientist (1936–2024)

The Honourable Ed Broadbent PC CC
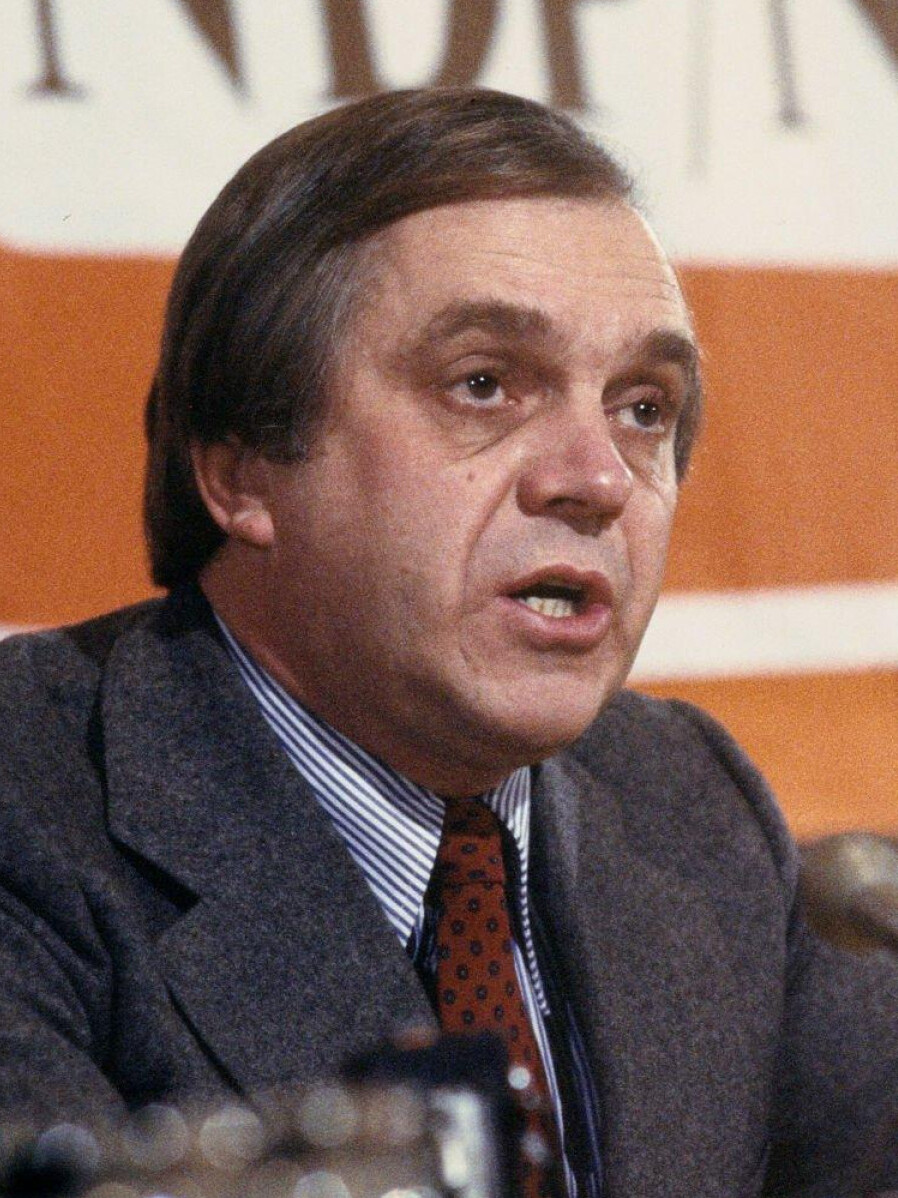
- Broadbent, c. 1980

Leader of the New Democratic Party
- In office July 7, 1975 – December 5, 1989
- Preceded by: David Lewis
- Succeeded by: Audrey McLaughlin

Member of Parliament for Ottawa Centre
- In office June 28, 2004 – January 23, 2006
- Preceded by: Mac Harb
- Succeeded by: Paul Dewar

Member of Parliament for Oshawa Oshawa—Whitby (1968–1979)
- In office June 25, 1968 – February 1, 1990
- Preceded by: Michael Starr
- Succeeded by: Michael Breaugh

Personal details
- Born: John Edward Broadbent; March 21, 1936 Oshawa, Ontario, Canada
- Died: January 11, 2024 (aged 87) Ottawa, Ontario, Canada
- Party: New Democratic
- Spouses: Yvonne Yamaoka (m. 1961; div. 1967); Lucille Broadbent (m. 1971; died 2006); Ellen Meiksins Wood (m. 2014; died 2016)
- Education: Trinity College, Toronto
- Profession: politician and professor

John Edward Broadbent (March 21, 1936 – January 11, 2024) was a Canadian social-democratic politician and political scientist. He was leader of the New Democratic Party (NDP) from 1975 to 1989, and a member of Parliament from 1968 to 1990 and from 2004 to 2006. He led the NDP through four federal elections. He oversaw a period of growth for the party with its parliamentary representation rising from 17 to 43 seats as of the 1988 federal election.

Broadbent also served as a vice-president of Socialist International from 1979 to 1989 and director of the International Centre for Human Rights and Democratic Development from 1990 to 1996. Returning to politics in the 2004 federal election, he was elected to represent Ottawa Centre. He later chaired the Broadbent Institute, a policy think tank founded in 2011.

== Early life ==
John Edward Broadbent was born in Oshawa, Ontario, the son of Percy, who worked at General Motors, and Mary (Welsh) Broadbent, a homemaker.

In 1961, he married Yvonne Yamaoka, a Japanese Canadian town planner whose family had been interned by the federal government in World War II. They divorced in 1967.

Broadbent received a Doctor of Philosophy (PhD) degree in political science from the University of Toronto in 1966, with a thesis titled "The Good Society of John Stuart Mill," under the supervision of C.B. Macpherson.

== Early political career (1968–1975) ==
Broadbent was a university professor when he won a seat in the House of Commons of Canada in the riding of Oshawa—Whitby during the 1968 federal election. He defeated Progressive Conservative MP Michael Starr, a former cabinet minister (under John Diefenbaker), by fifteen votes in a close three-way race. He began his parliamentary service in the 28th Canadian Parliament.

After Tommy Douglas retired from the leadership of the party, Broadbent stood to succeed him but was eliminated on the second ballot of the 1971 leadership convention; David Lewis became leader. In 1974, Lewis himself retired as leader, due to a disappointing electoral result for the NDP in that year's federal election and ill health. Broadbent won the 1975 leadership election to succeed Lewis, going on to lead the party through four national elections.

== Leader of the NDP (1975–1989) ==
In the 1979 federal election, the NDP under Broadbent boosted their seat count from 17 to 26 seats. In the 1980 election nine months later, Broadbent's NDP again experienced a boost of support from 27 to 32 seats. Following the election, Prime Minister Pierre Trudeau approached Broadbent about the possibility of forming a coalition government even though his Liberals had just won a working majority government. Broadbent declined Trudeau's offer.

In the 1984 federal election, the NDP finished with 30 seats, just ten behind the Liberal Party led by John Turner.

After the election, Broadbent's personal popularity was consistently in first place among the leaders of federal parties. In 1987, he became the first NDP leader who took the party to first place in public opinion polling since it was founded. Some pundits predicted that the NDP could supplant Turner's Liberals as the primary opposition to the Brian Mulroney-led Progressive Conservatives. Like Turner, Broadbent supported Mulroney's proposed Meech Lake Accord (which proposed recognizing Quebec as a distinct society and extending provincial powers), which led to some dissent within the NDP.

In the 1988 federal election, the NDP under Broadbent won 43 seats, a record unchallenged until the 2011 federal election, when it won 103 seats. Despite the polling milestones prior to the election, the NDP was not successful in translating this into a major breakthrough, as they remained in third place (behind the second-place Liberals). Broadbent gained criticism for not making the NDP's opposition to the Canada–United States Free Trade Agreement the main issue during the campaign, as the Liberals reaped most of the benefits from opposing the agreement.

On the international front, Broadbent served as a vice-president of Socialist International from 1979 to 1989, during which time Willy Brandt, the former chancellor of West Germany, was its president.

Broadbent stepped down after 14 and a half years as leader of the federal NDP at the 1989 Winnipeg Convention, when he was succeeded by Audrey McLaughlin. He also resigned his Oshawa seat in the House of Commons that year. The 1990 Oshawa federal by-election was held for the NDP by Michael Breaugh.

== Post-leadership (1989–2004) ==
In the decade following Broadbent's retirement from politics, the federal NDP declined in popularity. The party would not come close to the popularity that it had enjoyed under Broadbent until Jack Layton took over the leadership in 2003.

Broadbent was director of the International Centre for Human Rights and Democratic Development from 1990 to 1996. In 1993, he was made an Officer of the Order of Canada and was promoted to Companion in 2001.

Broadbent spent a year as Fellow at All Souls College, University of Oxford, in 1996–1997.

== Member of Parliament (2004–2006) ==
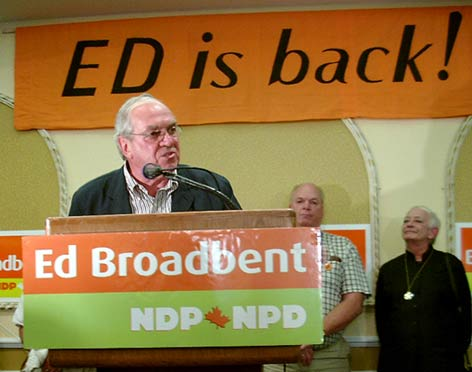
Broadbent in 2005

At Layton's invitation, Broadbent returned to politics in 2004. With the aid of a humorous and popular video clip, he successfully ran for Parliament in the riding of Ottawa Centre, where he lived later in life. He defeated the Liberal candidate, Richard J. Mahoney, a close ally of Prime Minister Paul Martin. In the NDP shadow cabinet, Broadbent was Critic for Democracy: Parliamentary & Electoral Reform, Corporate Accountability as well as Child Poverty. On May 4, 2005, he announced that he would not seek re-election in the 39th federal election so that he could spend time with his wife, Lucille, who was suffering from cancer. She died on November 17, 2006.

== After politics ==
In November 2008, Broadbent and former Prime Minister Jean Chrétien came out of retirement to help to negotiate a formal coalition agreement between the Liberals and the New Democratic Party, which the Bloc Québécois would support. It was to replace the Conservative government led by Prime Minister Stephen Harper and would have been the first coalition government in Canada since World War I, when Robert Borden governed as a Unionist. The idea died after Michaëlle Jean, the Governor General of Canada, prorogued Parliament in December 2008 at Harper's request.

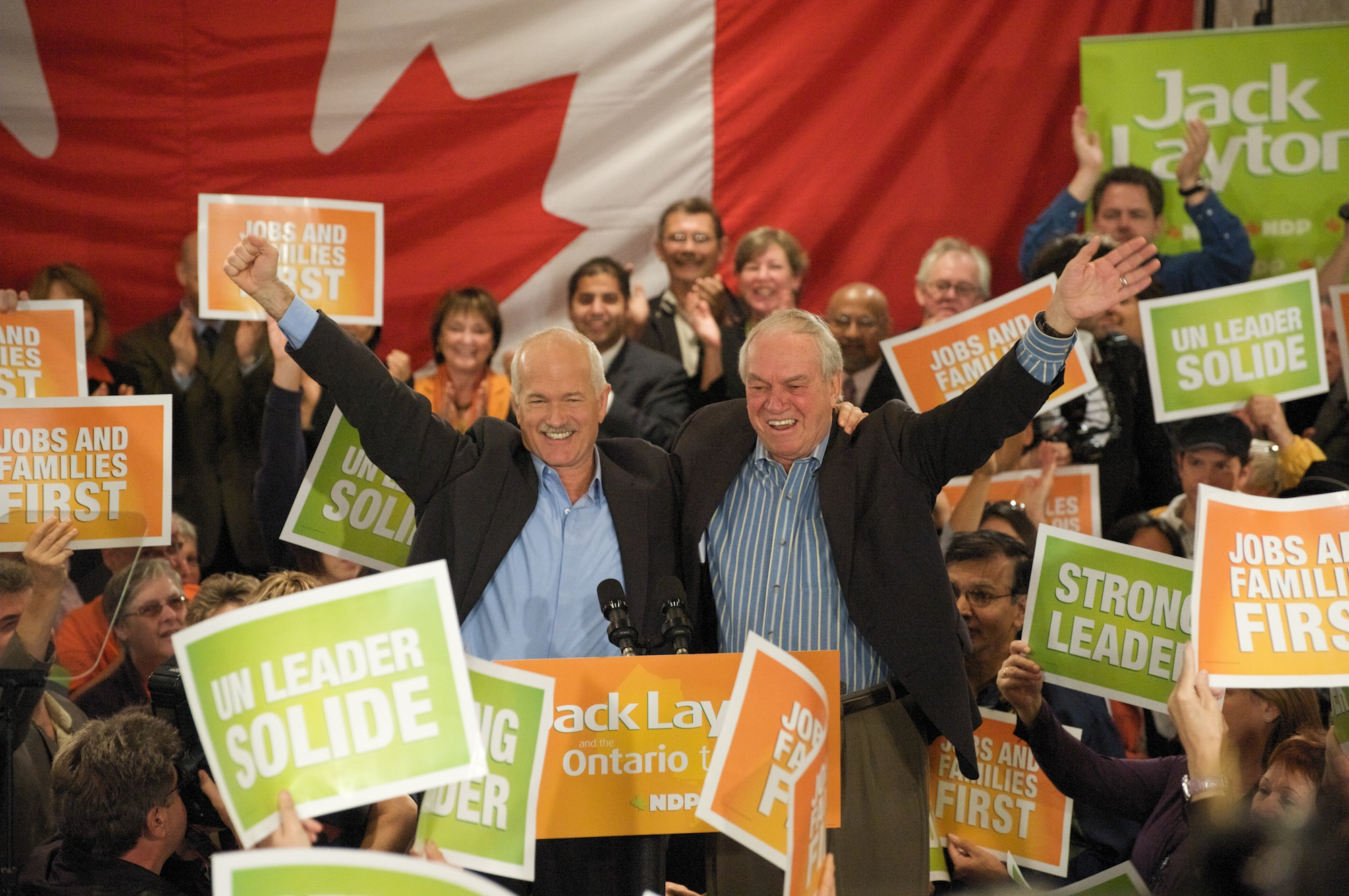
Broadbent (centre, right) and Jack Layton at a rally in Toronto for the 2008 Canadian federal election.

Broadbent announced the creation of the Broadbent Institute on June 17, 2011, to explore social-democratic policy and ideas. It provides a vehicle for social-democratic and progressive academics, provides education, and trains activists. It is independent of the New Democratic Party. Three months later, he endorsed Brian Topp in his unsuccessful campaign during the 2012 leadership election.

In 2017, Broadbent voiced his support for the campaign for the establishment of a United Nations Parliamentary Assembly, an organization that advocates for democratic reform in the United Nations, and the creation of a more accountable international political system. Five years later, he published Seeking Social Democracy, a detailed reflection on his life and career, co-authored with academic Francis Abele, policy strategist Jonathan Sas, and journalist Luke Savage.

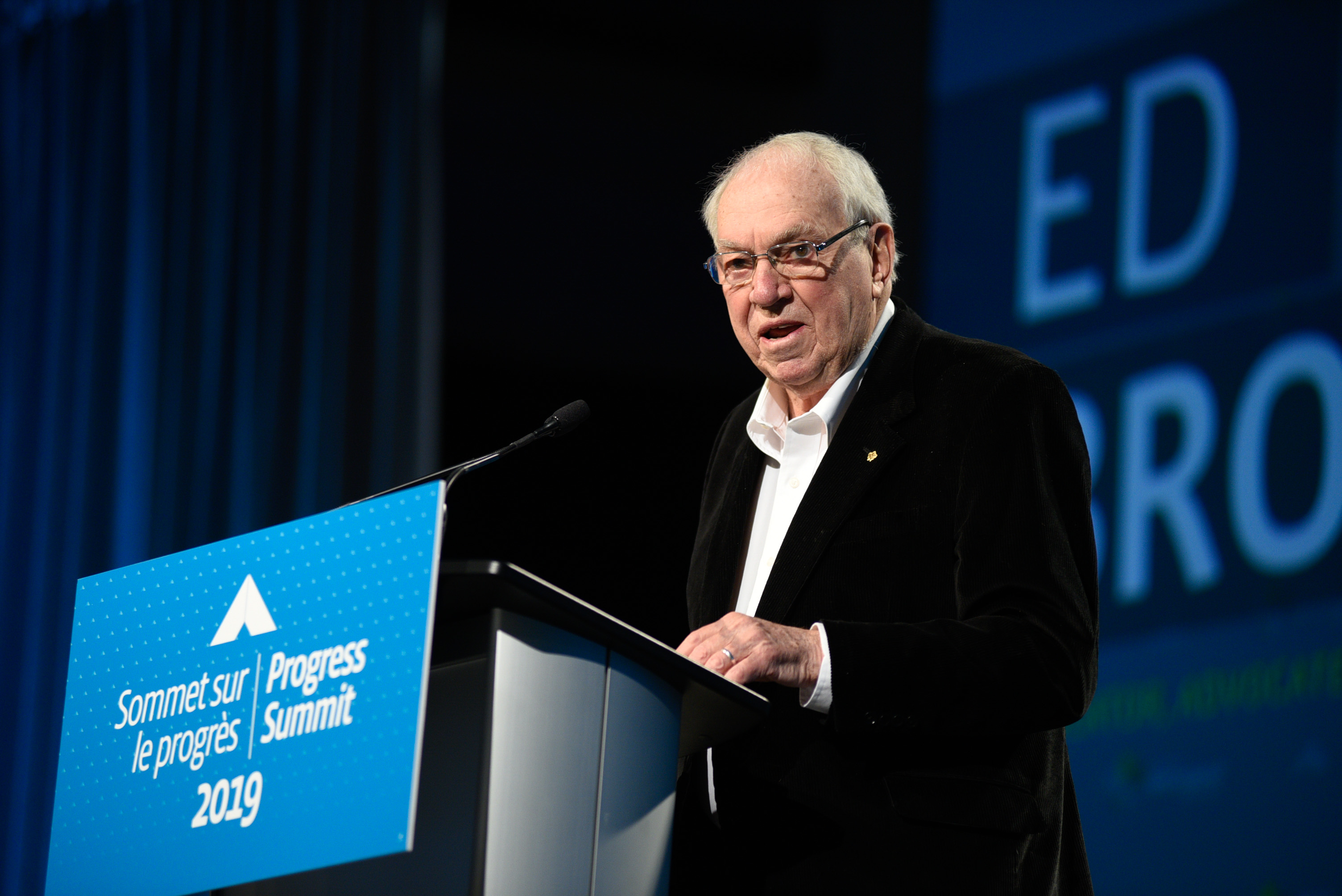
Broadbent delivers opening remarks at the Broadbent Institute's Progress Summit in Ottawa, 2019

Until his death, he was a fellow in the School of Policy Studies at Queen's University.

== Personal life ==
In 1971, Broadbent married a Franco-Ontarian widow, Lucille Munroe. Munroe died of cancer on November 17, 2006, at the age of 71. Broadbent married the Marxist historian and political theorist Ellen Meiksins Wood, an old friend, in 2014. She was a political theorist and socialist historian, author of several books, and a professor at York University for three decades. She died of cancer at the couple's Ottawa home at 73 in January 2016.

Broadbent died on January 11, 2024, at the age of 87. His state funeral on January 28 at Carleton Dominion-Chalmers Centre in Ottawa was the first Canadian state funeral for a party leader who was never prime minister nor leader of the official opposition.

== Archives ==
There is an Ed Broadbent fonds at Library and Archives Canada.

== Books ==
- The Liberal Rip–off: Trudeauism Versus the Politics of Equality, New Press 1970.
- Democratic Equality: What Went Wrong? (as editor), University of Toronto Press 2001. ISBN 9780802083326
- Seeking Social Democracy: Seven Decades in the Fight for Equality, with Frances Abele, Jonathan Sas, and Luke Savage, ECW Press 2023. ISBN 9781778522154

Parliament of Canada
Preceded by Electoral District created in 1968 known as Oshawa—Whitby until 1979	Member of Parliament for Oshawa; 1968–1990	Succeeded by Michael Breaugh; NDP
Preceded by Mac Harb; Liberal	Member of Parliament for Ottawa Centre; 2004–2006	Succeeded by Paul Dewar; NDP
Party political offices
Preceded by David Lewis	Leader of the New Democratic Party; 1975–1989	Succeeded by Audrey McLaughlin
