= CKXP-FM =

Radio station in Peterborough, Ontario

Coordinates: 44°19′41″N 78°17′58″W

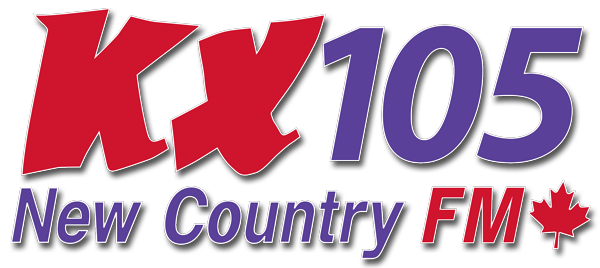
- Peterborough, Ontario; Canada
- Broadcast area: Peterborough County
- Frequency: 105.1 MHz
- Branding: KX 105

Programming
- Format: Country

Ownership
- Owner: Durham Radio
- Sister stations: CKPT-FM

History
- First air date: September 16, 1977
- Former call signs: CKQM-FM (1977–2025)
- Call sign meaning: "KX Peterborough" (disambiguation of CJKX-FM and CHKX-FM)

Technical information
- Class: B
- ERP: 7,500 watts
- HAAT: 277.5 metres (910 ft)

Links
- Webcast: Listen Live
- Website: kx105.fm

CKXP-FM (105.1 FM, "KX 105") is a radio station in Peterborough, Ontario. Owned by Durham Radio, it broadcasts a country music format.

== History ==
In 1976, Radio CKPT 1420 Ltd. (a division of CHUM Limited), received CRTC approval to operate a new commercial FM station at Peterborough. It would broadcast on a frequency of 105.1 MHz and have an effective radiated power of 50,000 watts (horizontal & vertical). The station was launched on September 16, 1977, with a MOR format. The "QM" in CKQM-FM's call sign stood for "Quality Music".

In October 1983, CKQM switched to a country format, becoming Country 105.

On March 24, 2009, CKQM received approval by the CRTC to decrease the effective radiated power from 50,000 watts to 7,500 watts, and increasing height above average terrain from 91.5 to 277.5 meters. In FM Broadcasting, effective radiated power is Inversely proportional to antenna height.

On May 13, 2011, the CRTC denied an application to increase the station's effective radiated power from 7,500 watts to 14,000 watts (non-directional), citing that CTVglobemedia failed to demonstrate that the station's existing coverage was inadequate in Peterborough.

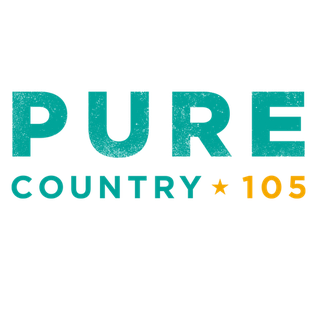
Logo as Pure Country 105, 2019-2025

On May 28, 2019, the station rebranded as Pure Country as part of a national rebranding of all Bell Media country stations.

On February 8, 2024, Bell announced that it would sell 45 of its radio stations as part of cuts, with CKQM and CKPT-FM being sold to Durham Radio. On January 30, 2025, the CRTC approved the sale to Durham.

On May 5, 2025, Durham Radio rebranded the station as KX 105, with no change in format; the new branding is modelled after its new sister stations CJKX-FM in Ajax and CHKX-FM in Hamilton. CKQM also changed its call letters to CKXP-FM to match the "KX" branding.
