= Durham Radio =

Canadian radio broadcasting group

Durham Radio, Inc.
- Company type: Private
- Industry: Media
- Founded: Oshawa, Ontario (1994)
- Founder: Douglas Kirk
- Headquarters: Oshawa, Ontario
- Products: Radio broadcasting
- Website: www.durhamradioinc.com

Durham Radio, Inc. is an Oshawa, Ontario-based radio broadcaster founded in 1994 by Douglas Kirk. The company owns twelve radio stations and their associated repeaters, which are primarily located in the Golden Horseshoe region of Southern Ontario.

In 2021, Durham Radio received CRTC approval to acquire Vancouver's CIRH-FM, marking its first station outside of Ontario.

On February 8, 2024, as part of its divestment of 45 radio stations, Bell Media Radio announced the sale of three stations to Durham Radio: CKLY-FM in Lindsay, Ontario, and CKPT-FM and CKQM-FM in Peterborough, Ontario. The sale was approved by the CRTC on January 30, 2025.

== Stations ==
- Ajax - CJKX-FM
- Grimsby - CKLK-FM
- Hamilton - CHKX-FM - CHTG-FM
- Lindsay - CKLY-FM
- Oshawa - CKDO/CKDO-1-FM - CKGE-FM
- Peterborough - CKPT-FM - CKXP-FM
- Sunderland - CJKX-FM-1
- Toronto - CJKX-FM-2
- Vancouver - CIWV-FM
