= CKNS =

CKNS may refer to:

- CKNS (AM), a defunct radio station in Espanola, Ontario, later superseded by CKNR-FM
- the original call sign of CHTG-FM in Caledonia, Ontario
- chemical formula of Potassium_thiocyanate
