= CJDV =

CJDV may refer to:

- CJDV-FM, a radio station (107.5 FM) licensed to Cambridge, Ontario, Canada
- CKDQ, a radio station (910 AM) licensed to Drumheller, Alberta, Canada, which held the call sign CJDV from 1958 to 1981
