= Broken Arts =

Defunct arts organization in Ontario, Canada

- Formation: July 2009; 17 years ago
- Founder: Harley R. Pageot; Mike Rosenplot; Natalie Garcia
- Dissolved: 2018; 8 years ago
- Location: Oshawa, Ontario, Canada
- Volunteers: 28 (2014)
- Formerly called: The Broken Arts Collective

Broken Arts was a not-for-profit arts group based in Oshawa, Ontario, Canada. The group was formed in July 2009 and operated until 2018, hosting various all-ages events including concerts, craft fairs, workshops, dances, art shows, open mics, and festivals. The organization was run by volunteers and had a total of twenty-eight members as of September 11, 2014.

== History ==
The group, originally called The Broken Arts Collective, was formed in 2009 by Harley R. Pageot, Mike Rosenplot, and Natalie Garcia, who had noticed a lack of creative and organized collaboration in Oshawa. The group's name was a reference to the need for different arts groups to be brought together in Oshawa. The main goal quickly evolved into supporting youth engagement and opportunity in arts culture, and making all-ages events and venues more accessible.

The Broken Arts Collective began by hosting six weeks of free art jam sessions in a downtown café. Shortly after, the group announced a concert series titled Soundtracked. The concert's success motivated them to host more events; as of 2014, Broken Arts hosted more than fifty music concerts and over seventy-five other events.

Broken Arts contributed to events such as Buskerfest Oshawa, as well as coordinating local musician busking for the City of Oshawa's Canada Day celebrations. Buskerfest, held in downtown Oshawa on June 24, 2010, hosted seventy acts featuring local musicians, dancers, painters, and more. In May 2010, Broken Arts also hosted its first craft fair at the Oshawa McLaughlin Public Library, which featured DIY vendors and poetry readings.

Beginning in 2010, the group conducted an audience survey each year in order to determine the winners of Broken Arts Music Awards (BAMA). The group held an annual event to give out the tangible DIY-made awards to local artists, bands, venues, and music stores.

=== Broken Arts Fest ===
Broken Arts Fest was a free all-ages festival held in downtown Oshawa at Memorial Park. The annual event began in 2011 and was entirely volunteer-run and fundraised. In 2012, the festival expanded from fifteen musical acts to twenty-three, in addition to forty-four vendors throughout the park. In 2013 the festival continued to grow, with a total of thirty-five bands performing. The same year, Canadian indie magazine Broken Pencil stated that the Broken Arts festival was "bringing back the DIY vendor market place." The fourth annual festival took place in 2014 and consisted of nineteen bands on two separate stages, as well as a free yoga session, an arts and crafts workshop station, and a number of vendors.

== Awards ==
In 2013, at the annual Durham Art of Transition Creative Awards (DATCA), Broken Arts received the Best Creative Collaboration award. The award, given by Durham Tourism, acknowledged the group's efforts to engage the community in events that promote "co-operation between traditional businesses and independent artists, for mutual and community economic and cultural benefit."

== CD release ==
Broken Arts co-founder Harley Pageot would later leave the collective to found Fallen Love Records, a small record label based out of Oshawa. The first album that his record label produced was a compilation album featuring original songs by bands and artists that had performed for Broken Arts over the years. On October 6, 2012, the album, titled Broken Arts Presents: Half Built Horizons, was released

In an interview with blogger Sarah Crookall, Pageot stated that the title Half Built Horizons is a commentary on Oshawa's music scene: ″We're at a really interesting point in the arts and music scene in Oshawa, but we're not fully there yet. We're not at the level of a Guelph or a Hamilton yet, we're at the halfway point.″ William McGuirk, a freelance writer and longtime Oshawa resident, wrote that the album was ″a gathering of hometown talents and local heroes on one disc.″

=== Track listing ===
1. "Maybe Baby" by Chris and Cassy - 3:00
2. "The One" by Darling Meadow - 4:08
3. "Stuck in a Snare" by Hairy Holler - 3:37
4. "Jived at Dong Point!" by Home Movies - 3:03
5. "Lock Me Up" by Avery Island - 4:04
6. "Honestly" by Katrina James - 3:31
7. "You Just Slept" by Viva Mars - 2:25
8. "Stuck in a Revolving Door" by Persian Rugs - 3:04
9. "Knock Knock, Who's There? Doctor! Doctor Who" by Watershed Hour - 5:10
10. "Large Blank Space" by The Undrummer - 4:09
11. "Lady With the Weary Eyes" by The Cane Toads - 3:12
12. "When the Mountains are Trees" by Jesse Maranger - 4:18
13. "Adore You" by Elephant Shoes - 3:06
