= CJKX-FM =

Radio station in Ajax, Ontario

Coordinates: 43°59′02″N 79°01′28″W

- Ajax, Ontario; Canada
- Broadcast area: Durham region
- Frequency: 95.9 MHz (HD Radio)
- Branding: KX96

Programming
- Format: Country
- Subchannels: HD2: Smooth jazz Wave.FM; HD3: CKDO simulcast

Ownership
- Owner: Durham Radio Inc.
- Sister stations: CHKX-FM

History
- First air date: November 21, 1967
- Former call signs: CHOO (1967–1994)
- Former frequencies: 1390 kHz (AM) (1967–1994)
- Call sign meaning: ‘Jax KX (branding)

Technical information
- Licensing authority: CRTC
- Class: B
- ERP: 19,940 watts average 50,000 watts peak
- HAAT: 96 metres (315 ft)

Links
- Webcast: Listen Live
- Website: kx96.fm

CJKX-FM (95.9 FM, "KX96") is a radio station licensed to Ajax, Ontario. Owned by Durham Radio, it broadcasts a country music format serving the Durham region. Its studios are located in Oshawa alongside sister stations CKDO and CKGE-FM. The station broadcasts in the HD Radio format.

== History ==
The station was launched on November 21, 1967 as AM 1390 CHOO. The station was acquired in 1973 by Community Communications, and in 1977 by Golden West Broadcasting. In 1994, the station was acquired by its current owner, Durham Radio, and moved to its current FM frequency.

In 1999, the station added a 5 kW rebroadcaster (CJKX-FM-1) in Sunderland, operating on 89.9 FM to cover the area that receives interference from first-adjacent CFJB-FM.

In 2006, CJKX was approved by the Canadian Radio-television and Telecommunications Commission to add a rebroadcaster (CJKX-FM-2) in downtown Toronto, to operate on 95.9 FM, the same frequency as the main station. That rebroadcaster's transmitter is located atop the First Canadian Place.

The CHOO callsign was formerly used at a now defunct station in Tofino, British Columbia from 2000 to 2002. The current "CHOO" callsign is now currently being used at a radio station Drumheller, Alberta, known today as CHOO-FM. Both of these stations that used the "CHOO" callsign have no relation to CJKX.

On August 1, 2016, the CRTC denied an application by Durham Radio to increase the station's effective radiated power (ERP) from 122 to 194 watts; it ruled that Durham Radio presented no meaningful reason to increase the station's power besides a stated intent to use it as a "back door" to expand coverage in Toronto and Mississauga (Durham Radio had intended the wider coverage to appeal to those commuting to and from the region), thus compromising its commitment to serve the Durham region as licensed.
