= CHOO-FM =

Radio station in Drumheller, Alberta

- Drumheller, Alberta; Canada
- Broadcast area: Drumheller
- Frequency: 99.5 MHz (FM)
- Branding: Boom 99.5

Programming
- Format: Classic hits

Ownership
- Owner: Stingray Radio
- Sister stations: CKDQ-FM

History
- Call sign meaning: "Hoodoo"

Technical information
- Class: A
- ERP: 1,700 watts
- HAAT: 37 meters (121 ft)
- Transmitter coordinates: 51.461°N 112.708°W

Links
- Website: boom995.ca

CHOO-FM (99.5 FM, "Boom 99.5") is a radio station in Drumheller, Alberta. Owned by Stingray Radio, it broadcasts a classic hits format.

== History ==
The station was licensed by the CRTC in 2008, and officially launched at 8:00 AM MST on April 28, 2009 as 99.5 Drum FM.

The CHOO callsign was formerly used at a radio station, known today as CJKX-FM in Ajax, Ontario from 1967 to 1994 and at another station, (now defunct) in Tofino, British Columbia from 2000 to 2002. Both of these stations that used the CHOO callsign have no relation to the current CHOO-FM in Drumheller, Alberta.

On January 7, 2019, Stingray Radio announced its intent to acquire CHOO-FM from Golden West Broadcasting; this would make it a sister to CKDQ. On August 28, 2019, CHOO flipped from adult contemporary to classic hits as Boom 99.5.
