= CHOO-FM (British Columbia) =

Former radio station in Tofino, British Columbia, Canada

- Tofino, British Columbia; Canada
- Frequency: 101.7 MHz

Programming
- Format: Community radio

Ownership
- Owner: P. L. M. Broadcasting Ltd.

History
- First air date: 2000
- Last air date: January 15, 2002

Technical information
- ERP: 50 watts
- Transmitter coordinates: 49.152°N 125.904°W

CHOO-FM was a radio station which broadcast on 101.7 MHz in Tofino, British Columbia, Canada from 2000 to 2002.

== History ==
On July 15, 1999, P. L. M. Broadcasting Ltd. received approval from the Canadian Radio-television and Telecommunications Commission (CRTC) to operate a new FM radio station at Tofino. The new station would broadcast with 50 watts of power with a mixture of a MOR format, including modern and light rock, classic and modern country music as well as local talent, and a talk show. The station also provided native languages like Nuu-chah-nulth language, consisting of stories and native music, along with two hours of french-language programming weekly. Funding for the station was to be provided by the Ma-Mook Development Corporation, a non-profit business development corporation created by the five Central Region First Nations of the Nuu-chah-nulth Tribal Council.

CHOO-FM signed on at 101.7 MHz in early 2000. In 2001, the station switched to an adult contemporary format to attract more listeners.

On January 15, 2002, CHOO-FM broadcasting at 50 watts on 101.7 MHz was shut down, due to a lack of advertising revenue and other problems. CHOO-FM's licence renewal was approved on August 15, 2005 (from September 1, 2005, to October 31, 2006).

The CHOO callsign was formerly used at a radio station in Ajax, Ontario from 1967 to 1994, which is known today as CJKX-FM. As of 2009, the current CHOO callsign now belongs to a radio station in Drumheller, Alberta, known as CHOO-FM.
