= CHKX-FM =

Radio station in Hamilton, Ontario

Coordinates: 43.23793°N 79.86674°W

- Hamilton, Ontario; Canada
- Broadcast area: Golden Horseshoe
- Frequency: 94.7 MHz (HD Radio)
- Branding: KX 94.7

Programming
- Format: Country
- Subchannels: HD2: Smooth jazz Wave.fm; HD3: CHTG-FM

Ownership
- Owner: Durham Radio Inc.
- Sister stations: CJKX-FM, CHTG-FM, CKDO, CKGE-FM

History
- First air date: September 1, 2000
- Former call signs: CIWV-FM (2000–2011)
- Call sign meaning: "Hamilton's KX"

Technical information
- Class: C1
- ERP: 40,000 watts average 100,000 watts peak
- HAAT: 139.9 metres (459 ft)

Links
- Website: kx947.fm

CHKX-FM is a Canadian radio station, broadcasting at 94.7 FM from Hamilton, Ontario and licensed to Hamilton/Burlington. The station airs a country format branded as KX 94.7. CHKX's studios are located on Upper Wellington Street in Hamilton, while their transmitter is located atop the Niagara Escarpment near Stoney Creek.

The station cannot be reliably heard in most of the Niagara Region due to the presence of adjacent-channel interference from WNED-FM, a classical music station in Buffalo, New York.

== History ==
=== Wave 94.7 ===
Wave 94.7 Logo 2000-2011

CHKX-FM originally launched on September 1, 2000, as CIWV-FM with a smooth jazz format by Burlingham Communications Inc., a company controlled by Douglas Kirk, the owner of CJKX-FM in Ajax. Local radio consultant Rae Roe initially owned a small interest in the company. Roe sold his interest in the station in early 2001.

In 2007, the station applied to add new transmitters in Meaford, Peterborough and Ottawa, Ontario. All applications were denied by the CRTC.

CHKX-FM Hamilton has gone through several technical changes and more than doubled its power in November 2009.

On September 1, 2007, Burlingham Communications Inc merged with Durham Radio Inc., an Oshawa, Ontario based company also controlled by Douglas Kirk. The new merged entity continued operations under the Durham Radio banner.

=== KX 94.7 ===
Current HD2 format

On August 1, 2011, CIWV dropped its jazz format and flipped to country music as KX 94.7, changing its calls to CHKX-FM to match the new branding; the previous Wave format moved to an internet radio station.

In December 2015, the CRTC granted approval for CHKX to utilize HD Radio services. Wave.FM would return to the airwaves as a digital subchannel on 94.7-HD2 for listeners in the Hamilton area.

In September 2017, sister station CJKX-FM launched HD broadcasts. Like CHKX-HD2, CJKX’s HD2 subchannel airs Wave.FM programming for listeners in the Durham Region area.
