= Oshawa Museum =

- Location of the Oshawa Museum
- Established: May 21, 1960
- Location: Oshawa, Ontario, Canada
- Coordinates: 43.8639°N 78.8269°W
- Type: Historical museum
- Collection size: over 40,000
- Visitors: over 10,000
- Website: http://www.oshawamuseum.org/

The Oshawa Museum is a historical museum founded by the Oshawa Historical Society, located in Oshawa, Ontario, Canada. It has a dual role as a museum; exhibits for the general public, and archival storage of the city's historical documents. Every building in the museum is designated under the Ontario Heritage Act. The museum preserves and celebrates the history of Oshawa, and the surrounding area from the 15th century to the present day.

== Historical development ==
The Oshawa Historical Society, which manages the Oshawa Museum, was founded in 1957. It was founded to fulfill the interests of Oshawa citizens in preserving the history of the city and surrounding region. With support from the City of Oshawa and the provincial government in the form of financing, the organization began under the name of "The Oshawa and District Historical Society". The society was admitted to the Ontario Historical Society in 1959, and officially incorporated in 1965. In 1959, the City of Oshawa granted the use of three settler homes in the Oshawa harbour area to be used as a community museum. The first iteration of the museum came in the form of the Henry House Museum in 1960, where a homestead (Henry House) built circa 1840 was renovated to reflect an 1870s Victorian era theme, complete with historic furniture and artifacts.

In 1964, the dilapidated family home, Robinson House (c. 1856), was restored in 1969 through fund-raising drives. As many cottages along the lakefront were being demolished, in 1980, it was suggested that Guy House (a farmhouse, dating to c. 1845), could be restored as it possessed historic character. In 1985, Guy House was opened, completing the three components of the museum. In 1988, the society was renamed "The Oshawa Historical Society". The 1990s saw the hosting of highly successful traveling exhibits such as the Royal Ontario Museum's Discovery of the Titanic. The museum launched its first website in 1998. Also in 1998, the museum changed its name from the "Oshawa Sydenham Museum and Community Archives" to the "Oshawa Community Museum and Archives". In 2003, a fire caused by an arsonist destroyed much of the office space and a portion of the archives in Guy House. Less than two percent of the entire collection was burned. In 2005, the Museum received Leader of the Opposition (now Prime Minister) Stephen Harper as part of discussions relating to Oshawa's harbour area In 2016, the Museum changed its name and is known as the 'Oshawa Museum.'

== Buildings ==
The Oshawa Museum occupies three buildings (Guy House, Henry House, and Robinson House), all dating back to the early- to mid-19th century. The local history of Oshawa is interpreted through the restored buildings All three museum buildings stand on their original foundations. Exhibits, events and administrative functions all form a part of the building use at the museum.

=== Guy House (c. 1845) ===
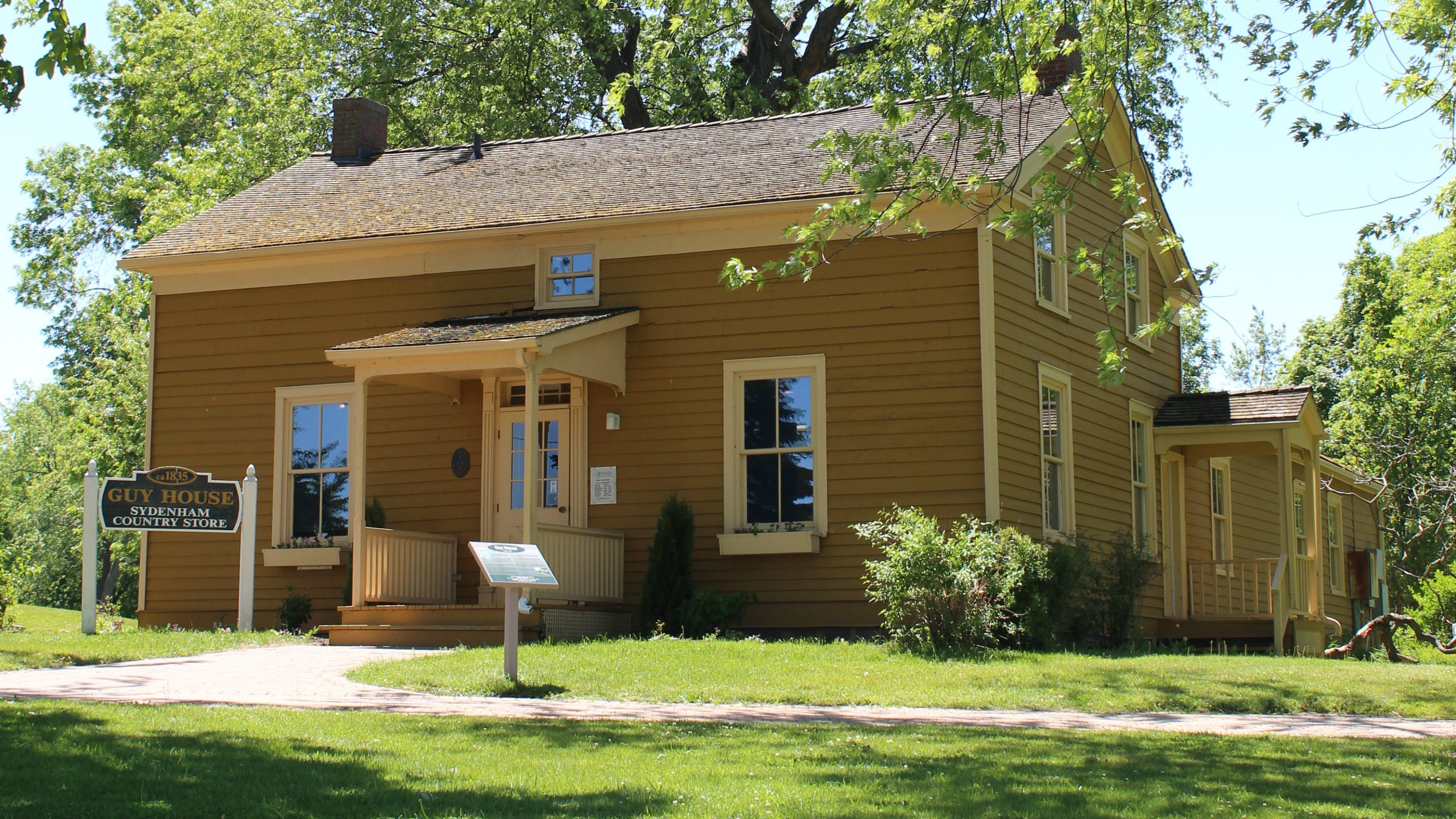
Guy House, June 2016

Guy House is the centre of administrative functions. Unlike Henry House and Robinson House, Guy House was not constructed in a Colonial style, instead it is a simple frame farmhouse. It was constructed by an early settler named Samuel Phillips and sold to James Odgers Guy, its most prominent resident, in 1861.

=== Henry House (c.1840) ===
Henry House was constructed by Thomas Henry (a harbourmaster, farmer and minister) in c. 1840, on a lot purchased in 1815 by his father. The house was built in the style of a Regency cottage, and it is typical of a Victorian era home as several architectural elements include limestone from Kingston, Ontario and a wood-shingled roof. It was the first iteration of the museum, known at the time as the Henry House Museum, but currently it is used to represent the day-to-day life of the Henry family.

=== Robinson House (c. 1856) ===
Robinson House was constructed in 1856 for the Robinson family. The Robinsons (John and Ruth), immigrated to Canada in 1833, and moved to the Oshawa area in 1840. It was passed down in the family until 1965 when it was turned over to the "Oshawa and District Historical Society". Robinson House served as a typical family home in that era. The building was restored and opened to the public in 1969. It was built in a Dutch-colonial style, featuring a two-tiered open veranda; an architectural style which was not commonly found in Upper Canada, but in New England. Robinson House contains different exhibits which highlight the role Oshawa and the surrounding area had during the Victorian era and the turn of the 20th century.

== Exhibits ==
Many exhibits showcased at the museum take place in both the Robinson House and the Henry House.

=== Permanent Exhibits ===
==== A Carrying Place: Oshawa's Indigenous Story ====
The Oshawa Museum's permanent exhibit focuses on Oshawa's Indigenous history, located on the second floor of Robinson House. It profiles two archaeological excavations that occurred in Oshawa, the MacLeod Site (1968–1972) and the Grandview Site (1992), which uncovered the history of the ancestral Wendat who lived in the area during the 15th century, from 1400 to 1470 CE. In both cases, pottery shards, evidence of settlement and migration, as well as cultivation techniques were discovered, and artefacts from these excavations are displayed. The exhibit shows the traditional carrying route, discusses the study of archaeology, and highlights the Indigenous community today. This exhibit connects visitors with the past, embraces the present Indigenous community, and builds towards a spirit of reconciliation and partnership.

==== Henry House Exhibit ====
This exhibit explores the life of the Henry family, while being reflective of the Victorian period during the 1870s. Several artifacts in the exhibit belonged to the Henry family, and others belonged to other people who lived in the Oshawa area. The exhibit contains for viewing: a study (where Thomas Henry tended to his duties as a harbourmaster, minister and farmer), a parlour for entertaining guests, a dining hall, a kitchen and the master bedroom.

==== Drive Shed ====
The Drive Shed was designed to commemorate the 50th anniversary of the Oshawa Historical Society and it opened in 2009. The Drive Shed complements the exhibit in Henry House by displaying period carriages, buggies and other large artifacts. The collection includes two McLaughlin cutters (circa 1900) and a Piano Box buggy (circa 1900) among other artefacts. Each artifact in the timber-framed building has a tie to Oshawa's industrial history.

=== Temporary exhibits ===
The museum occasionally showcases local culture and history with temporary rotating exhibits on a wide array of topics. Exhibitions change two to three times through the year, enabling the organization to showcase Oshawa's diverse history.

== Special events and tours ==
=== Tours ===
Three types of tours are given at the museum: Guided tours, self-guided tours, and audio tours. The Museum also offers tours of different locations in the City of Oshawa, such as the popular downtown walking tour, the harbour area, and tours of Oshawa's Union Cemetery.

=== Special events ===
Various events take place at the museum such as Victorian teas, educational programs for children, lectures, photography contests, seasonal events and speakers series.
