= Don Shafer =

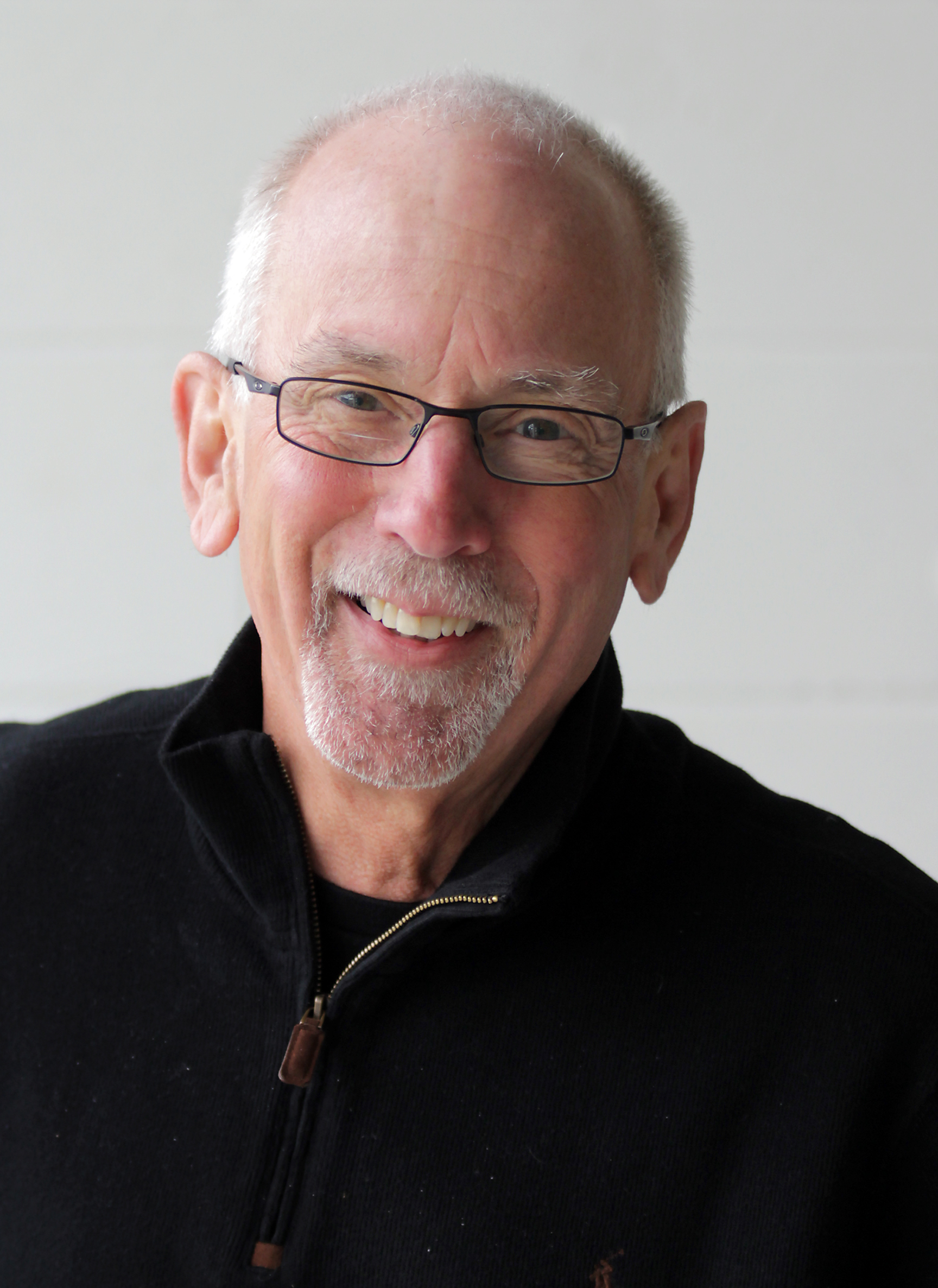

Don Shafer (born May 25, 1947) is a Canadian broadcaster, journalist, academic, and community activist. After a five-decade career in North American radio as an on-air host and media executive, he shifted his focus to public scholarship and research on dialogue, climate communication, and polarization. Shafer is the creator and host of The Conversation Lab and holds a PhD from the University of British Columbia. He lives on Bowen Island (Nex̱wlélex̱m), in British Columbia.

== Early life ==
Shafer was born in Pittsburgh, Pennsylvania and served in the U.S. military from 1965 to 1969 as a communication specialist.

== Broadcast career ==
Shafer began his broadcast career at WEEP AM Pittsburgh, and also with KNAC FM Long Beach, California, and KPPC FM in Pasadena, California.

In 1970, Shafer immigrated to Canada. He worked on-air with CHOM-FM (Montreal) from 1970 to 1972,CHUM FM (Toronto) from 1972 to 1976, and The Fox (Vancouver) from 1976 to 1986.

Shafer was named Program Director at The Fox in 1980 under Moffat Communications. In 1986, he was hired as the program director for Rock 101 in Vancouver. In 1988, he moved to Toronto as the President and General Manager and WIC Director of Programming at CILQ-FM. He was Senior Vice President at Pelmorex Radio Network in Ontario from 1992 to 1997.

Shafer was hired as Torstar Media Group's Vice President and General Manager in 1997. He worked on the development of the Toronto Star TV, which extended the Toronto Star newspaper brand into television.

Shafer moved to SUN FM/AM1150/CILK FM in the BC Interior as Vice President and Regional Manager in 2003, where he remained until 2013. In 2013 and 2014, he became the interim General Manager at Jim Pattison Broadcasting's Q104 and FAB 94 in Winnipeg, participating in the acquisition of the two stations. In this capacity, he oversaw 22 radio stations and two television stations in the BC Interior, as Vice-President and Regional Manager with Standard Media, and took part in the transition to new ownership by Astral and then Bell Media.

In 2014 Shafer co-founded Roundhouse Radio in Vancouver, and became its President and CEO. In 2015 Shafer served as a partner in the independent ownership group of 98.3 Roundhouse Radio Vancouver, which was granted a license by the CRTC in August 2014.

Shafer has served on boards and committees at the Canadian Association of Broadcasters, the Radio Marketing Bureau, Television Marketing Bureau, the Small Market Independent Television Group, the British Columbia Association of Broadcasters and FACTOR and is a past President of the Ontario Association of Broadcasters.

== Community service ==
Shafer has also served on the boards of Variety the Children's Charity in Vancouver and Toronto, The Canadian Culinary Championships and the Kelowna General Hospital Foundation. In 2015, he was working with PFLAG and Qmunity Vancouver, the Canadian Red Cross, the British Columbia Institute of Technology, the UBC Advisory Board, and the BC Chiefs of Police Association.

He received the British Columbia Association of Broadcasters 50 Year Certificate of Service in 2014, and was simultaneously inducted into the Canadian Broadcast Hall of Fame.

Shafer was also presented with the 2015 Allan Waters Broadcast Lifetime Achievement Award.

As a life long learner Shafer graduated from Simon Fraser University with his MA in 2018 and was invited to join the Social Justice Institutes PhD program at the University of British Columbia in 2019. He achieved candidacy in 2023 and received his doctorate in 2025. Dr. Shafer explored how language, power, and identity shape polarization in families, communities, and societies. His work shows how intentional, compassionate dialogue can repair relationships, foster belonging, and strengthen democracy by keeping conversation alive. https://open.library.ubc.ca/soa/cIRcle/collections/ubctheses/24/items/1.0449834

Writing and publications

Shafer’s writing focuses on dialogue, media, climate communication, and social justice. His publications include:

Mahtani, M. & Shafer, D. (2018). “Dialogue, Discourse, Disjunctures: Building Critically Affirmative Politics in Radio,” Dialogues in Human Geography (University of Victoria Press).

Shafer, D. (2018). Climate Change and the Many Faces of Denial (Master’s thesis, Simon Fraser University).

Shafer has presented research and public scholarship at conferences in Canada, and the United States, including:

Communicating Climate Hope, UBC & Tilburg University (2024) Near-Death Experiences and Patient-Centred Care, 47th AHVA Graduate Symposium, UBC (2024) Sticks & Stones, Roots & Bones: Exploring the Power of Words in a Polarized World, Emerging Research in Podcast Studies Symposium, Memorial University & Dublin City University (2023) The Human Cost of Climate Change, invited speaker & moderator, University of Michigan (2022) Victoria Forum, University of Victoria (2022) NASH81: The Heart of the Interview, keynote speaker, Calgary (2019) Climate Change and the Many Faces of Denial, West Coast Liberal Studies Symposium, University of Washington (2017) Emergency Preparedness in a Changing World, Vancouver Board of Trade (2017) Media’s Role in Climate Change, Simon Fraser University (2017) The Pope, the Poet and the Patriot, BC Society of Landscape Architects (2017) What Is Wilderness?, West Coast Liberal Studies Symposium, SFU (2016)
