= CKLY-FM =

Radio station in Lindsay, Ontario

Coordinates: 44°16′47″N 78°41′56″W

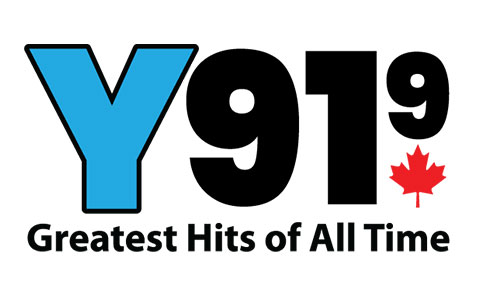
- Lindsay, Ontario; Canada
- Broadcast area: Kawartha Lakes
- Frequency: 91.9 MHz
- Branding: Y91.9

Programming
- Format: Adult hits

Ownership
- Owner: Durham Radio

History
- First air date: December 8, 1955
- Former call signs: CKLY (1955–1998)
- Former frequencies: 910 kHz (1955–1998)
- Call sign meaning: Kawartha Lakes and Lindsay (broadcast area)

Technical information
- Class: B
- ERP: 7,560 watts average 11,400 watts peak
- HAAT: 131 metres (430 ft)

Links
- Webcast: Listen Live
- Website: y919.fm

CKLY-FM (91.9 FM, "Y91.9") is a radio station in Lindsay, Ontario. Owned by Durham Radio, it broadcasts an adult hits format.

== History ==
The station was launched on December 8, 1955, on 910 AM, owned by Greg-May Broadcasting and licensed to the community of Lindsay. It was acquired by McNabb Broadcasting in 1981, and by Centario Communications in 1993.

On January 7, 1998, Centario received permission from the CRTC to convert CKLY to the FM band at 91.9 MHz with an effective radiated power of 14,000 watts. CKLY-FM began on-air testing in early April 1998 with low power from a tower at the studio location. Full-power tests began a short time later from a new tower located at the AM transmitter site. The station officially signed on at 91.9 FM in May branded as Y92 retaining the "CKLY" call letters. According to the Canadian Communications Foundation, the CKLY 910 AM transmitter was shut down on May 24, 1998.

The station was acquired by CHUM Limited on December 21, 2000, and by CTVglobemedia, now Bell Media on March 23, 2007.

On May 19, 2005, CKLY was given approval to decrease average effective radiated power from 14,000 to 5,270 watts (maximum ERP from 27,500 to 11,400 watts), to increase antenna height (from 45 to 131 metres EHAAT) and to relocate the transmitter.

On August 22, 2005, CKLY adopted the Bob FM branding and adult hits format.

On July 8, 2008, long-time CKLY owner Pete McNabb died at the Victoria Manor in Lindsay. McNabb owned CKLY for 25 years, from 1961 to 1986.

In 2011, the station was acquired by Bell Media. On May 18, 2021, the station was folded into Bell's new Bounce Radio branding, with no change in format.

On February 8, 2024, Bell Media announced that it would sell CKLY to Durham Radio. On January 30, 2025, the CRTC approved the sale to Durham.

On May 5, 2025, the station rebranded as Y91.9, maintaining a similar format.
