= CIWV-FM =

Radio station in Vancouver

- Vancouver, British Columbia; Canada
- Broadcast area: Greater Vancouver
- Frequency: 98.3 MHz (HD Radio)
- Branding: Wave 98.3

Programming
- Format: Smooth adult contemporary

Ownership
- Owner: Durham Radio

History
- First air date: October 15, 2015
- Former call signs: CIRH-FM (2015–2022)
- Call sign meaning: WV for "Wave"

Technical information
- Class: A
- ERP: 1,700 watts
- HAAT: 87.5 metres (287 ft)

Links
- Webcast: Listen Live
- Website: wave983.fm

CIWV-FM (98.3 MHz Wave 98.3) is a commercial FM radio station in Vancouver, British Columbia. It airs a smooth adult contemporary radio format and is owned by Durham Radio. The station's playlist combines rhythmic adult contemporary and smooth jazz vocals. The syndicated Dave Koz Radio Show is heard on Saturday evenings and Sunday mornings. The studios are on West Georgia Street in Downtown Vancouver.

CIWV-FM is a Class A FM station. It has an effective radiated power of 1,700 watts.

== History ==
=== CIRH-FM ===
The idea for the station came in 2012. Don Shafer, his partner Yvonne and a few friends were discussing what they would do if they owned a radio station and wrote the ideas on the back of a napkin. The idea was to create a radio station that was local and inclusive, influenced by public radio.

CIRH was licensed on August 6, 2014 by the CRTC which described the station format as "niche spoken word" targeting adults aged 25 to 64 in Vancouver. It was one of only two licenses granted in 2014, with the CRTC turning down nine others. Control of the station is exercised by Pushor Family Holding Corp., Okanagan Valley Business Consulting Ltd., Daudrich 2007 Family Trust and Craig and Candace Cameron, Don Shafer and Yvonne Evans, collectively Roundhouse Radio. The station broadcasts on FM 98.3, a low-power station covering the city of Vancouver.

The building for studios and offices is located in Railtown, a neighbourhood within Vancouver on the Downtown Eastside. This location was chosen due to the station having street access. Roundhouse Radio began broadcasting on October 15, 2015.

Logo as Roundhouse Radio

In April 2018, the station's board of directors announced that due to financial considerations, the station would shut down at the end of the month unless a last-minute financial arrangement could be made to save it.

At the end of April it was reported that the station had found a prospective buyer and that the board intended to keep the station on the air until the prospective sale was concluded. The station shut down on May 6, 2018, pending approval by the CRTC of the station's sale and transfer of its broadcast license.

=== CIWV-FM ===
An attempted sale of the station to South Fraser Broadcasting fell through. In July 2021, the CRTC approved a sale of the station to Ontario-based Durham Radio, which planned to flip the station to a mix of rhythmic adult contemporary and jazz music patterned after its internet radio station Wave.FM, a continuation of the format previously used by its Hamilton station CHKX-FM before flipping to country music in 2011. The CRTC granted a request for CIRH to be re-licensed as a specialty music station, relieving it of its obligations to broadcast spoken word programming. The acquisition marked Durham Radio's first station outside of Ontario.

On July 12, 2022, Durham Radio announced that the station would relaunch as smooth adult contemporary Wave 98.3 on July 18, 2022, with the new call letters CIWV-FM. The station planned to feature a mixture of smooth jazz, R&B, and adult contemporary hits.

=== Past Programming ===
CIRH as Roundhouse Radio used to broadcast 20 percent music with the remaining 80 percent on talk. Its programming included news, weather, sports, local event promotion, public affairs, documentaries, radio plays and dramas, slam poetry, programs of public debate such as talk shows. In addition to broadcasting in FM, the station streamed live from its website where archived content could also be downloaded.

CIRH programming had an evening show hosted by Kirk LaPointe, former CBC ombudsman and former mayoral candidate. Other programs included IMPACT with Don Shafer, focusing on community and non-profit organizations, middays with Jody Vance, Live from Railtown with Cory Price, a weekly blues music show hosted by Jim Byrnes, a daily afternoon drive magazine series hosted by Janice Ungaro and Cory Ashworth, a food and wine show hosted by Terry David Mulligan, an afternoon show hosted by Jana Lynne White, and weekday mornings with Gene Valitis.

The station's news and content director was Krystle Landert after the 2016 departure of Marcella Bernardo for CKWX. The station's former director of programming, Tracey Friesen, was eventually ousted and replaced by founder and CEO, Don Shafer.
