= CKDQ-FM =

Radio station in Drumheller, Alberta, Canada

Coordinates: 51°02′27″N 113°17′35″W

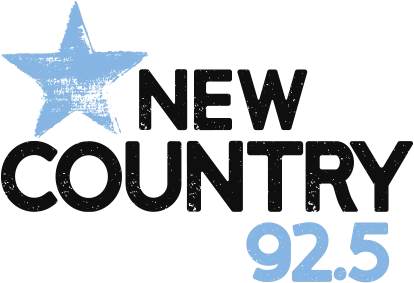
- Drumheller, Alberta; Canada
- Broadcast area: Drumheller
- Frequency: 92.5 MHz
- Branding: New Country 92.5

Programming
- Format: Country
- Affiliations: Westwood One, Drumheller Dragons

Ownership
- Owner: Stingray Group
- Sister stations: CHOO-FM

History
- First air date: 1958
- Former call signs: CJDV (1958–1981)
- Former frequencies: 910 kHz (1958–2024)

Technical information
- Class: B
- ERP: 24,745 watts average 36,000 watts peak
- HAAT: 38 metres (125 ft)

Links
- Website: newcountry925.ca

CKDQ-FM (92.5 FM New Country 92.5) is a radio station in Drumheller, Alberta. Owned by Stingray Group, it broadcasts a country format. Before the switch to FM, CKDQ was the only station in Canada that broadcast on 910 AM, a regional broadcast frequency.

== History ==
The station began broadcasting in 1958 as CJDV, until it changed to its current call sign in 1981. It is a Class B station broadcasting with a power of 50,000 watts, and using a two tower directional antenna daytime and a four tower directional antenna nighttime. The former CJDV callsign now belongs to a radio station in Cambridge, Ontario.

Previous logo

In 2016, the station became a semi-satellite of Camrose/Edmonton sister station CFCW, rebranding from Q91 to 910 CFCW; it carried a mix of CFCW and local programming. In October 2018, CKDQ rebranded as Real Country 910 (adopting a brand used by other Newcap-owned country stations in Alberta).

On March 5, 2024, CKDQ rebranded as New Country 910 to match the company’s other country music stations.

=== AM to FM ===
On May 5, 2023, Stingray Radio Inc. submitted an application to convert CKDQ to 92.5 MHz (channel 223B) with an average effective radiated power (ERP) of 24,500 watts (directional antenna with a maximum ERP of 36,600 watts with an effective height of antenna above average terrain [EHAAT] of 39.4 metres). The application was approved by the CRTC on February 9, 2024. In June, CKDQ announced on its website that they would switch to FM, rebranding as New Country 92.5 on June 20, originally planning to shut off their AM signal on June 24, before then extending the AM simulcast to the first week of July. CKDQ would ultimately start testing their FM signal on July 11, before going full power on July 15. It was then expected that the 910 signal would be switched off on July 19, though the signal was ultimately switched off on the morning of July 22 (local time).
