= CHTG-FM =

Radio station in Haldimand, Ontario

Coordinates: 42°56′29″N 79°50′44″W

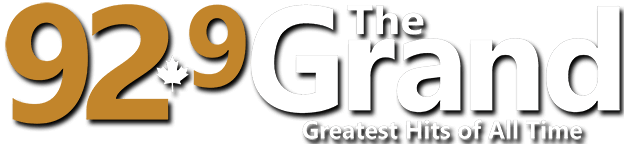
- Haldimand, Ontario; Canada
- Broadcast area: Hamilton region
- Frequency: 92.9 MHz
- Branding: 92.9 The Grand

Programming
- Format: Classic hits

Ownership
- Owner: Durham Radio Inc.

History
- First air date: May 15, 2006
- Former call signs: CKNS-FM (2006–2007); CKJN-FM (2007–2016)
- Call sign meaning: TG for "The Grand"

Technical information
- Class: B1
- ERP: 3,750 watts average 15,000 watts peak
- HAAT: 109.4 metres
- Repeater: 94.7 CHKX-HD3 (Hamilton)

Links
- Webcast: Listen Live
- Website: 929thegrand.fm

CHTG-FM is a Canadian radio station licensed to Haldimand, Ontario, serving the Hamilton region broadcasting at 92.9 FM with a classic hits format branded as 92.9 The Grand.

== History ==
=== Application for 92.9 ===
The station was first licensed in 2005 with the call sign CKNS-FM. The Canadian Radio-television and Telecommunications Commission approved the application for a station serving Haldimand, but assigned the frequency for which the station initially applied, 106.7 FM, to another station in a nearby market (CIKZ). Bel-Roc Communications then applied for 92.9, from a transmitter location approximately 20 kilometers (12 miles) east of the original, at lower effective radiated power, but from a higher tower. A contemporaneous competing application from CHCD in nearby Simcoe sought the adjacent frequency, 93.1, for a CHCD repeater in Haldimand.

CHCD alleged that while the parameters proposed for 106.7 would have put a signal into Hamilton sufficient to stay with Haldimand-to-Hamilton commuters and let the station to draw on revenues from the Hamilton radio market, those now proposed for 92.9 would put inadequate signals not only into Hamilton, but into much of Haldimand itself. CHCD contested the station could only survive on advertising revenue from Simcoe and Norfolk County, even in spite a condition of license barring it from soliciting local advertising in Simcoe (and also nearby Brantford).

Individually, CIWV (now CHKX-FM) in Hamilton and Standard Broadcasting, owners of CKLH, CKOC and CHAM in Hamilton, also opposed the application. They contended that the proposed signal into Haldimand was indeed impaired, but that the signal into the Hamilton area was actually significantly increased. Standard argued that CKNS would no longer focus uniquely on the Haldimand community; for a time in 2005, the proposed station's own website branded it a "Haldimand/Hamilton" station. CIWV – originally co-founded by Rae Roe, who had since sold his stake and gone on to co-found CKNS – suggested that CKNS perhaps be barred from soliciting advertising in Hamilton as well.

In response to these interventions, Bel-Roc agreed that they planned to solicit advertising in Hamilton, but insisted they would focus on Haldimand listeners; they disputed other details of the opposing interventions, and argued that the new parameters were necessary to meet Industry Canada requirements regulating the use of the broadcast spectrum.

The CRTC approved CKNS' application for 92.9, and denied CHCD's for 93.1 FM. This caused significant signal degradation for WBUF, the nearest station on 92.9, across the border in Buffalo, New York.

The application proposed a unique multi-genre Canadian format including a minimum 60% fully qualified Canadian content as defined by CRTC regulations. The balance of music would contain Canadian elements. This percentage was selected to enable the station to play popular music by Canadian artists that does not qualify under present rules as Canadian content.

The proposed format was inspired by Internet radio station LG73, which is in turn inspired by, and an unofficial tribute to, the former Vancouver broadcast station CKLG, when it was an AM station under that brand. CKLG was never exclusively or overwhelmingly devoted to Canadian content as the Internet station or the proposed Haldimand station.

Bel-Roc suggested that they would eventually apply to rebroadcast the station on available frequencies in many other Canadian cities.

=== Launch ===
After several weeks of test broadcasting, CKNS 92.9 FM officially went on the air at 6:00 a.m. on May 15, 2006, with an adult hits format. Former CKOC 1150 on-air DJ Bob Sherwin launched the station's morning show and hosted the morning show until his death on May 16, 2007, of a heart attack. Former FM 108 on-air DJ Burt Thombs launched the station's afternoon drive show. The station broadcasts from its offices and studios on Argyle Street South in Caledonia. Some of the station's content is also broadcast by live feed directly into the Caledonia studio from remote locations across the country, formerly including Phil Kushnir's show out of Vancouver.

=== Acquisitions ===
Haliburton Broadcasting Group became the controlling shareholder of Bel-Roc Communications in April 2007. That June, the station adopted the CKJN-FM call sign and adopted the brand name Jayne FM. In September, CKJN rebranded as Moose FM.

On April 23, 2012, Vista Broadcast Group, which owns a number of radio stations in western Canada, announced a deal to acquire Haliburton Broadcasting, in cooperation with Westerkirk Capital. The transaction was approved by the CRTC on October 19, 2012.

Logo as Country 92.9

On May 26, 2014, CKJN flipped to country as Country 92.9.

On July 8, 2016, the CRTC approved the sale & acquisition of the station to Durham Radio. Since CHKX significantly overlaps with CKJN's music playlist, it was rumoured that CKJN would flip to an oldies/classic hits format that was last carried by CKOC in Hamilton, until that station flipped to sports talk in September 2015.

On September 1, 2016, the station changed its format to classic hits, branded as 92.9 The Grand and adopted new call letters CHTG-FM.
