= Oshawa =

City in Ontario, Canada

- City (lower-tier)
- City of Oshawa
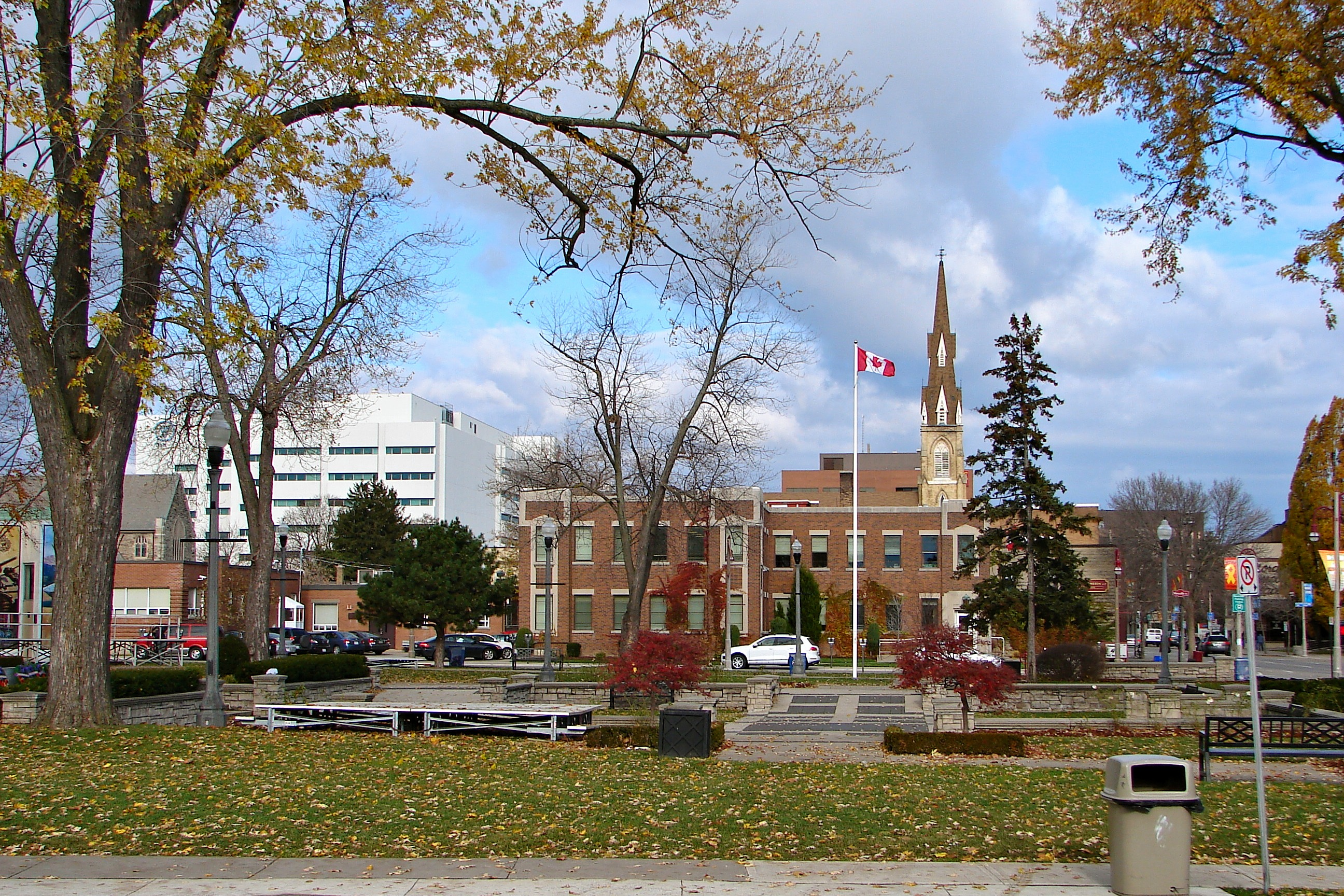
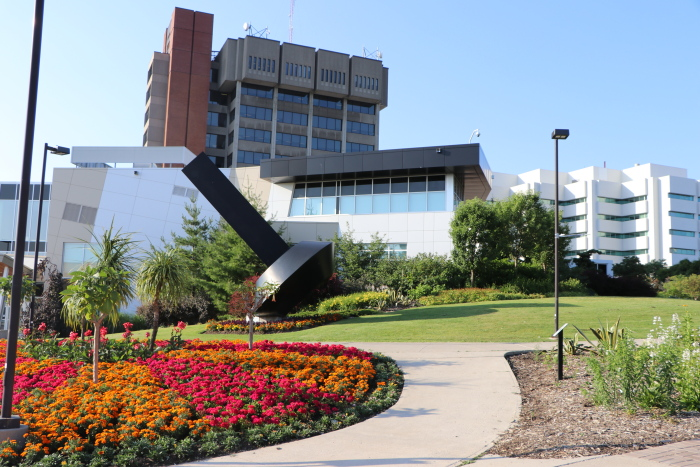
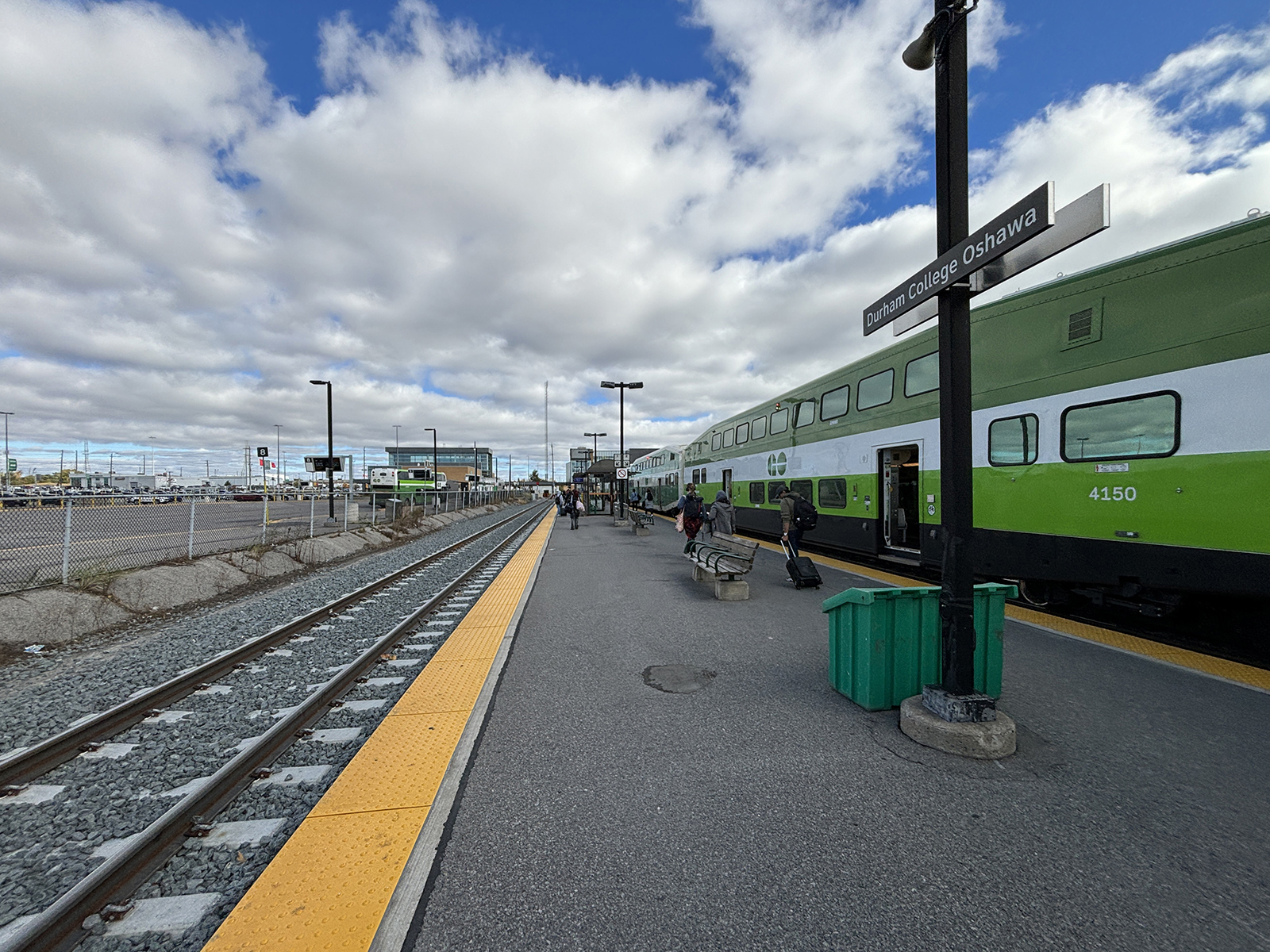
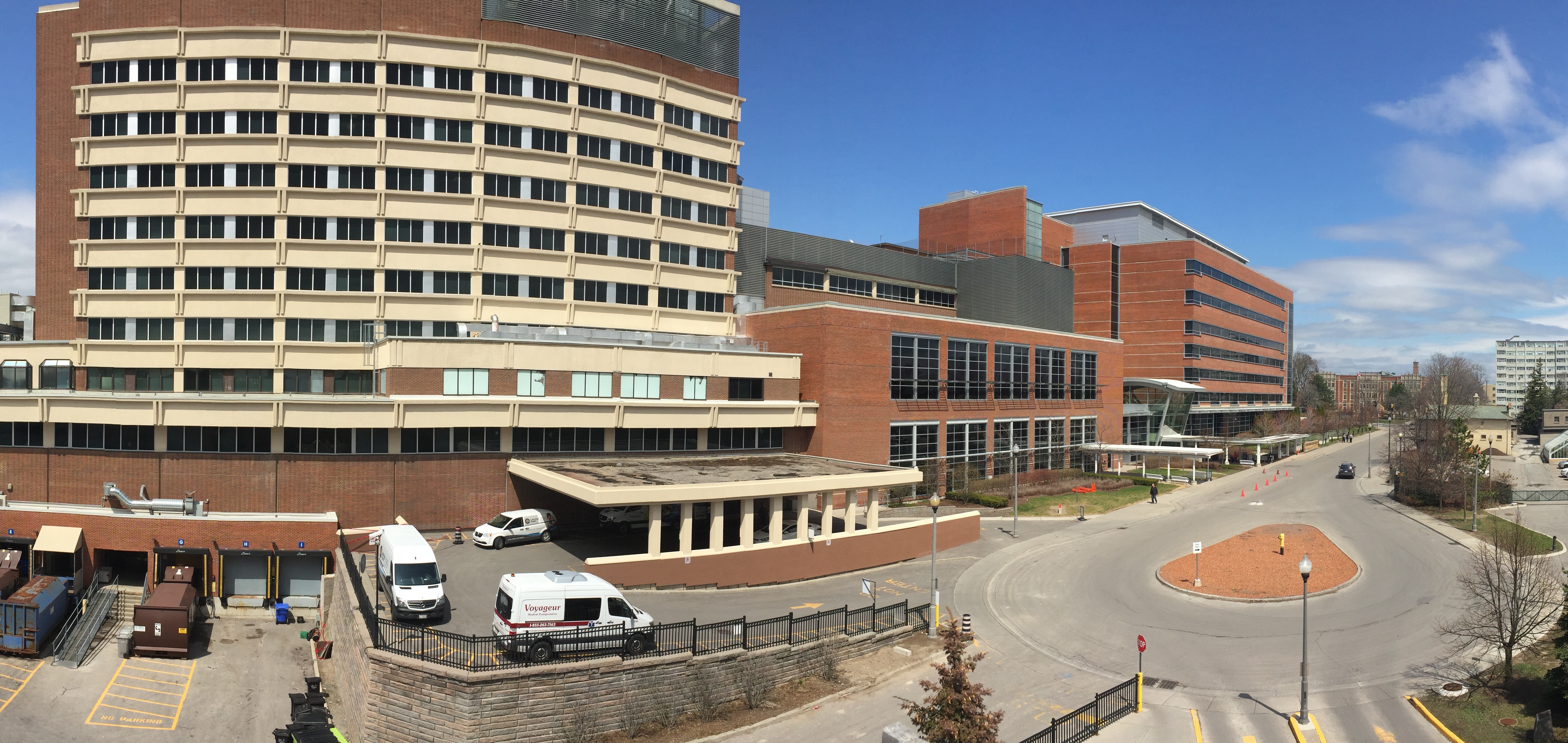
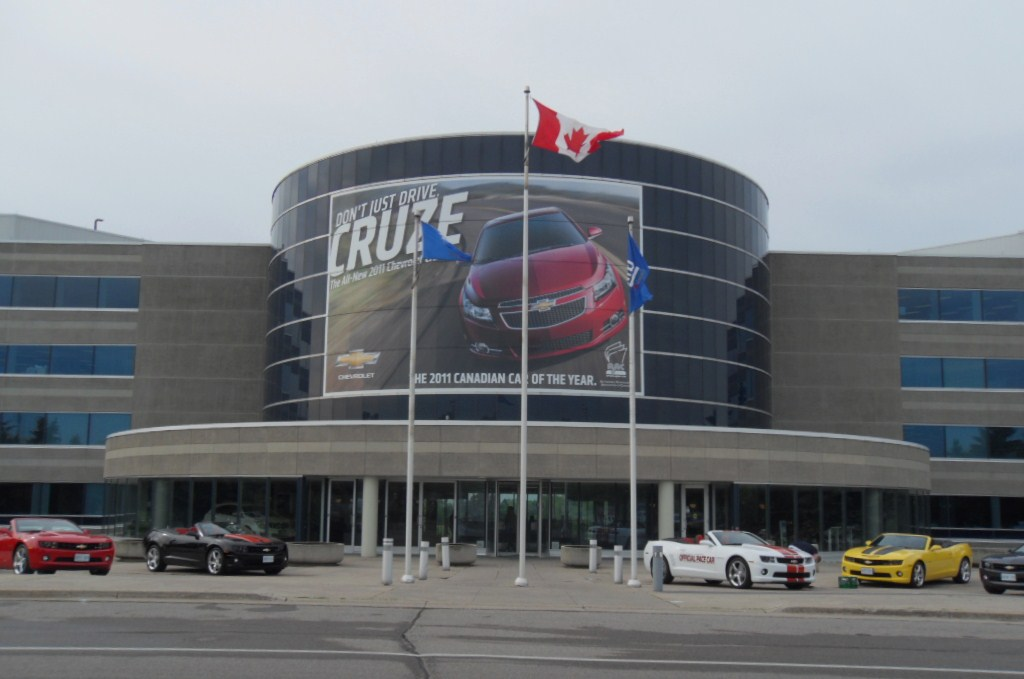
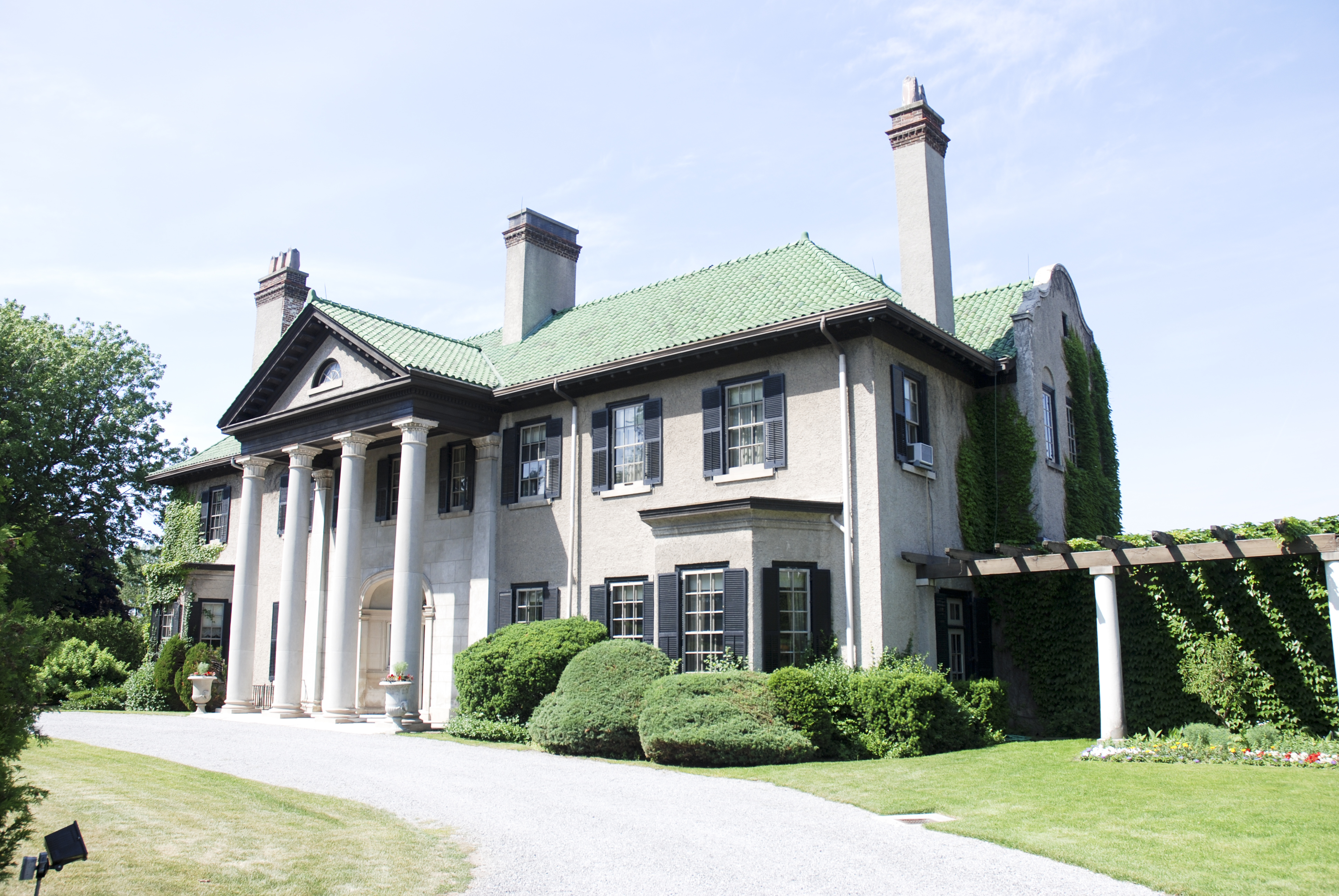
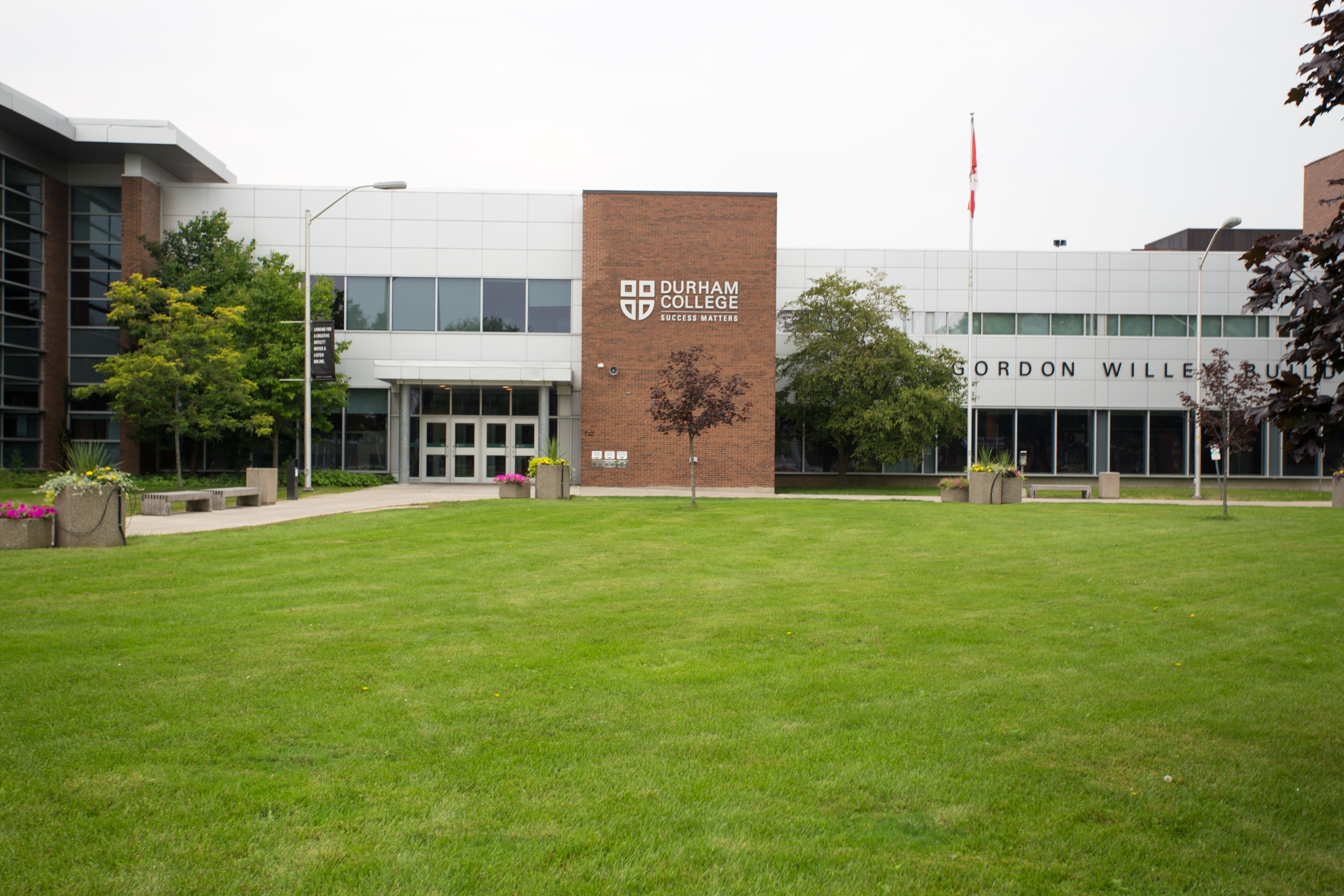
- Downtown Oshawa Oshawa City Hall GO Transit platform Lakeridge Health GM Canada Headquarters Parkwood Estate Durham College

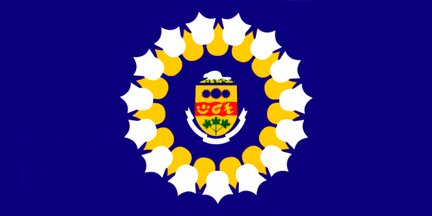
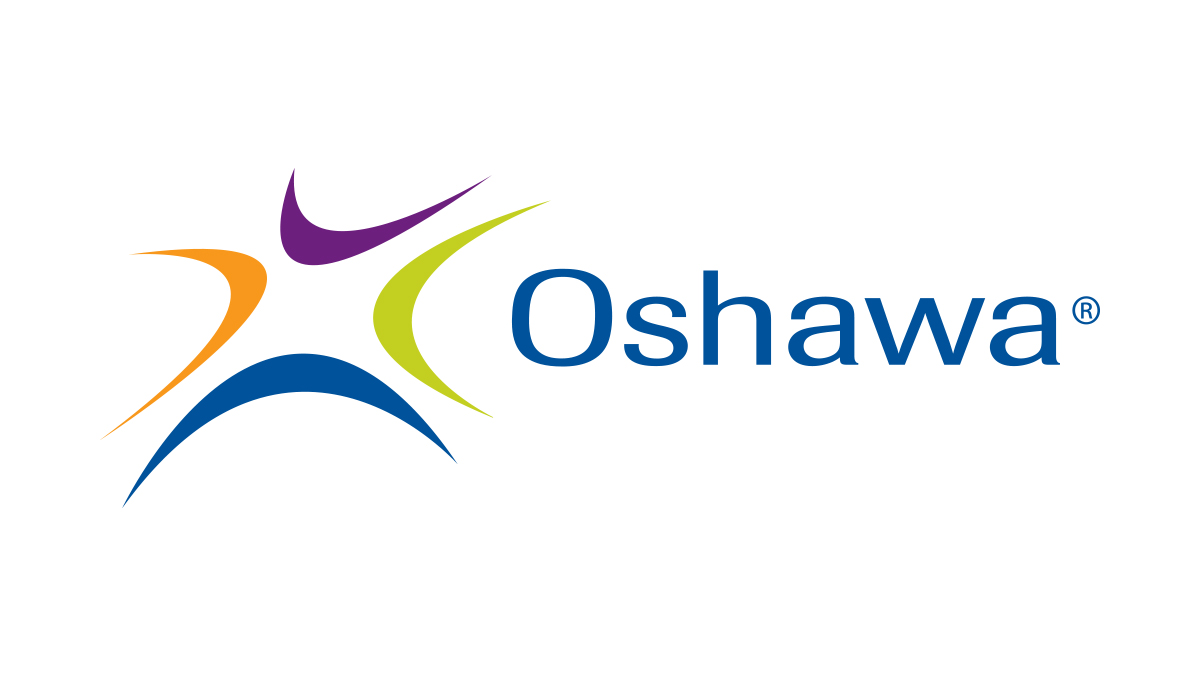
- Flag Coat of arms Logo
- Nicknames: "Canada's Motor City"
- Interactive map of Oshawa
- Location within Regional Municipality of Durham Location within Southern Ontario
- Coordinates: 43°54′02″N 78°51′26″W
- Country: Canada
- Province: Ontario
- Region: Durham Region
- Incorporated: Village: 1850 Town: 1879 City: March 8, 1924

Government
  - Mayor: Tito-Dante Marimpietri
  - Governing Body: Oshawa City Council
  - MPs: Rhonda Kirkland; Jamil Jivani
  - MPPs: Jennifer French; Todd McCarthy

Area
  - Land: 145.72 km^{2} (56.26 sq mi)
- Elevation: 106 m (348 ft)

Population (2021)
  - City (lower-tier): 175,383
  - Density: 1,203.6/km^{2} (3,117/sq mi)
  - Metro: 415,311

Gross Metropolitan Product
  - Oshawa CMA: CA$13.8 billion (2020)
- Time zone: UTC−05:00 (EST)
  - Summer (DST): UTC−04:00 (EDT)
- Forward Sortation Area: L1G to L1L
- Area codes: 905, 289, 365, and 742
- Website: www.oshawa.ca

Oshawa (Note: /ˈɒʃəwə/ OSH-ə-wə, also US: /-wɑː, -wɔː/ -wah, -waw; 2021 population 175,383; CMA 415,311)) is a city in Ontario, Canada, on the Lake Ontario shoreline. It lies in Southern Ontario, approximately 60 kilometres (37 mi) east of downtown Toronto. It is commonly viewed as the eastern anchor of the Greater Toronto Area and of the Golden Horseshoe. It is the largest municipality in the Regional Municipality of Durham. The name Oshawa originates from the Ojibwa term aazhawe, meaning "the crossing place" or just "a cross".

Founded in 1876 as the McLaughlin Carriage Company by Robert McLaughlin, and then McLaughlin Motors Ltd by his son, Sam, General Motors of Canada's headquarters are located in the city. The automotive industry was the inspiration for Oshawa's previous mottos: "The City that Motovates Canada", and "The City in Motion". The lavish home of the automotive company's founder, Parkwood Estate, is also located in the city.

Once recognized as the sole "Automotive Capital of Canada", Oshawa is now considered to be an education and health sciences hub, although General Motors still plays a significant role in the city's economy. After having been closed for about two years, the Oshawa car assembly plant reopened in 2021, when the first Canadian-made Chevy Silverado was completed. GM invested C$1.3 billion into plant retooling. Prior to reopening, GM said that the site would continue to be used for autonomous vehicle testing and production of vehicle stampings and other sub-assemblies.

Post-secondary institutions and a satellite family medicine program in Oshawa include Durham College, Trent University Durham, Ontario Tech University, and Queen's University Lakeridge Health MD Family Medicine Program. Key labour force sectors include healthcare, retail trade, and educational services. In 2016, Oshawa was the sixth best place in Canada to find full-time employment based on data from StatsCan.

Downtown Oshawa is identified as an Urban Growth Centre in the Government of Ontario's Places to Grow initiative. More than 5,000 people work and more than 2,400 university students study in the downtown core. The downtown is a prominent centre for entertainment and sporting events (Regent Theatre and Tribute Communities Centre), food (50+ restaurants and cafes), and culture (The Robert McLaughlin Gallery and Canadian Automotive Museum). Oshawa is home to a Regional Innovation Centre and offers start-up facilities for entrepreneurs and small businesses. Co-working offices are also located in the downtown area.

== History ==
Historians believe that the area that would become Oshawa began as a transfer point for the fur trade. Beaver and other animals trapped for their pelts by local natives were traded with the coureurs des bois (voyagers). Furs were loaded onto canoes by the Mississauga Natives at the Oshawa harbour and transported to the trading posts located to the west at the mouth of the Credit River. Around 1760, the French constructed a trading post near the harbour. This location was abandoned after a few years, but its ruins provided shelter for the first residents of what later became Oshawa. Most notably, one of the fur traders was Moody Farewell, an early resident of the community who was to some extent responsible for its name change.

In the late 18th century a local resident, Roger Conant, started an export business shipping salmon to the United States. His success attracted further migration into the region. A large number of the founding immigrants were United Empire Loyalists, who left the United States to continue to live under British rule. Later, Irish and then French Canadian immigration increased as did industrialization. Oshawa and the surrounding Ontario County were also the settling grounds of a disproportionate number of 19th century Cornish immigrants during the Cornish emigration which emptied large tracts of that part of England. As well, the surveys ordered by Governor John Graves Simcoe, and the subsequent land grants, helped populate the area. When Col. Asa Danforth laid out his York-to-Kingston road, it passed through what would later become Oshawa.

In 1822, a "colonization road" (a north–south road to facilitate settlement) known as Simcoe Street was constructed. It more or less followed the path of an old native trail known as the Nonquon Road, and ran from the harbour to the area of Lake Scugog. This intersected the "Kingston Road" (present-day King Street) at what would become Oshawa's "Four Corners." In 1836, Edward Skae relocated his general store approximately 800 m east to the southeast corner of this intersection; as his store became a popular meeting place (probably because it also served as the Post Office), the corner and the growing settlement that surrounded it were known as Skae's Corners. In 1842, Skae, the postmaster, applied for official post office status, but was informed the community needed a better name. Moody Farewell was requested to ask his native acquaintances what they called the area; their reply was "Oshawa," which translates to "where we must leave our canoes". Thus, the name of Oshawa, one of the primary "motor cities" of Canada, has the meaning "where we have to get out and walk". The name "Oshawa" was adopted and the post office named accordingly. In 1849, the requirements for incorporation were eased, and Oshawa was incorporated as a village in 1850.

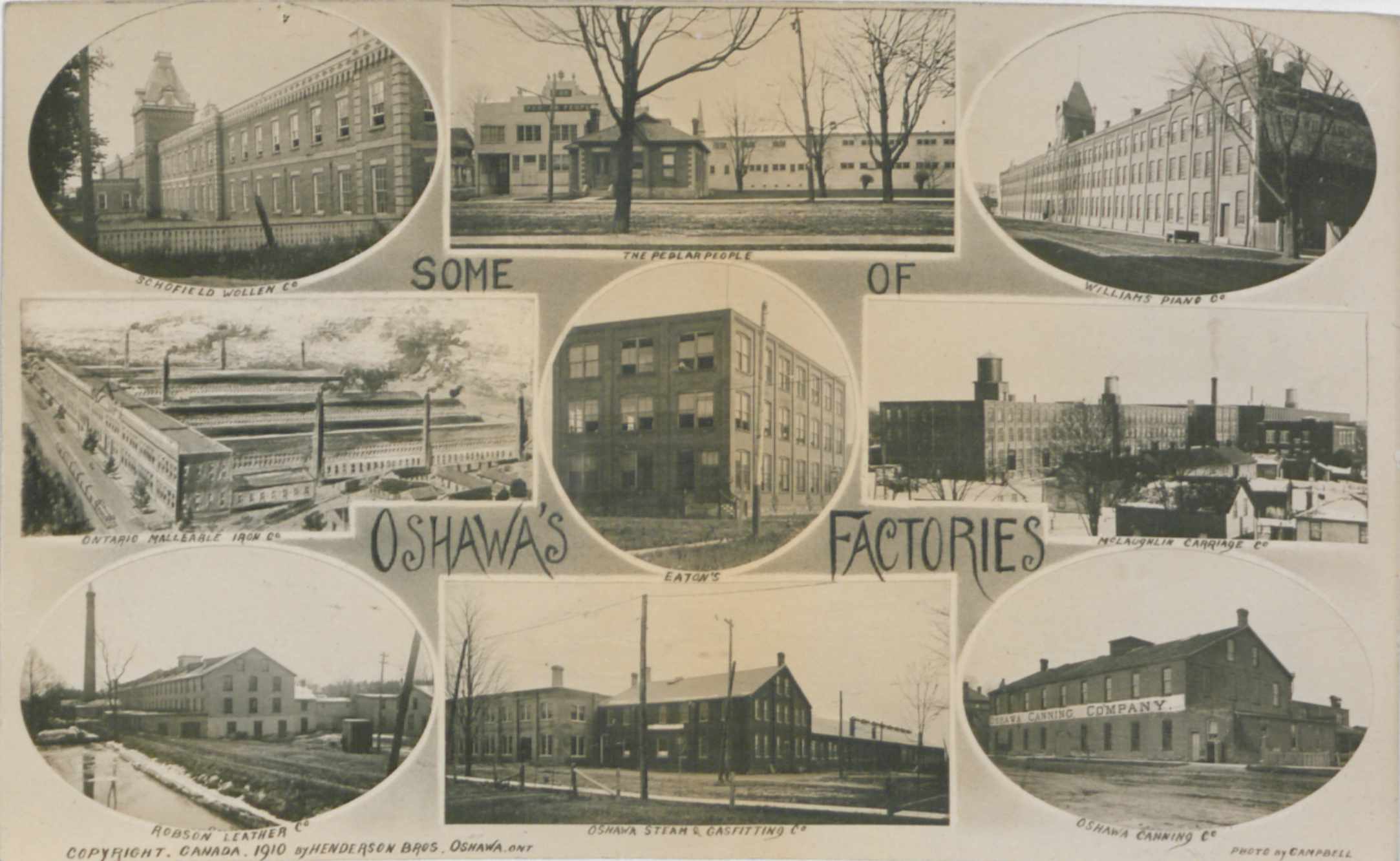
Oshawa Factories, 1910

The 1846 Gazeteer indicates a population of about 1,000 in a community surrounded by farms. There were three churches, a post office, tradesmen of various types and some industry: a foundry, a grist mill and a fulling mill, a brewery, two distilleries, a machine shop and four cabinet makers.

The newly established village became an industrial centre, and implement works, tanneries, asheries and wagon factories opened (and often closed shortly after, as economic "panics" occurred regularly). In 1878, Robert Samuel McLaughlin Sr. moved his carriage works to Oshawa from Enniskillen to take advantage of its harbour and of the availability of a rail link not too far away. He constructed a two-story building on Simcoe Street, just north of the King's Highway. This building was heavily remodelled in 1929, receiving a new facade and being extended to the north using land where the city's "gaol" (jail, firehall and townhall) had once stood. The village became a town in 1879, in what was then called East Whitby Township. Around 1890, the carriage works relocated from its Simcoe Street address to an unused furniture factory a couple of blocks to the northeast, and this remained its site until the building burned down in 1899. Offered assistance by the town, McLaughlin chose to stay in Oshawa, building a new factory across Mary Street from the old site. Rail service had been provided in 1890 by the Oshawa Railway; this was originally set up as a streetcar line, but c. 1910 a second "freight line" was built slightly to the east of Simcoe Street. This electric line provided streetcar and freight service, connected central Oshawa with the Grand Trunk (now Canadian National) Railway, and with the Canadian Northern (which ran through the very north of Oshawa) and the Canadian Pacific, built in 1912–13. The Oshawa Railway was acquired by the Grand Trunk operation around 1910, and streetcar service was replaced by buses in 1940. After GM moved its main plants to south Oshawa in 1951, freight traffic fell and most of the tracks were removed in 1963, although a line to the older remaining "north" plant via Ritson Road remained until 2000.

=== Start of the automotive industry ===
Col. R. S. McLaughlin and "Billy" Durant signed a 15-year contract in 1907, under which the McLaughlin Motor Car Company began to manufacture automobiles under the McLaughlin name, using Buick engines and other mechanical parts. 1908 Buick was merged into General Motors Holding shortly after, and in 1915 the firm acquired the manufacturing rights to the Chevrolet brand. Within three years, the McLaughlin Motor Car Company and the Chevrolet Motor Car Company of Canada owned the General Motors Holding in 1916 he in 1918 merged his Chevrolet and Buick, creating General Motors of Canada in 1918 with McLaughlin as President. The factory expanded rapidly, eventually covering several blocks. The growing usage of the automobile in the 1920s generated rapid expansion of Oshawa, which grew in population from 4,000 to 16,000 during this decade, and of its land area. In 1924, Oshawa annexed the area to its south, including the harbour and the community of Cedardale. This growth allowed Oshawa to seek incorporation as a city, which took place on 8 March 1924.

With the wealth he gained in his business venture, between 1915 and 1917, McLaughlin built one of the most stately homes in Canada, "Parkwood". The 55-room residence was initially designed by Toronto architect firm Darling and Pearson as well as John M. Lyle in the late 1930s. McLaughlin lived in the house for 55 years with his wife and they raised five daughters. The house replaced an older mansion, which was about 30 years old when it was demolished; the grounds of the earlier home had been operated as Prospect Park, and this land was acquired by the town and became its first municipal park, Alexandra Park. Parkwood today is open to the public as a National Historic Site. Tours are offered.

=== Strike: 1937 ===
On 8 April 1937, disputes between 4,000 assembly line workers and General Motors management led to the Oshawa Strike, a salient event in the history of Canadian trade unionism. As the weight of the Great Depression slowly began to lift, demand for automobiles again began to grow. The workers sought higher wages, an eight-hour workday, better working conditions and recognition of their union, the United Auto Workers (Local 222). The then-Liberal government of Mitchell Hepburn, which had been elected on a platform of being the working man's friend, sided with the corporation and brought in armed university students to break up any union agitation. These much-derided "Hepburn's Hussars" and "Sons of Bitches" were never needed as the union refused to be drawn into violent acts. The union and workers had the backing of the local population, other unions and the Co-operative Commonwealth Federation party and, on 23 April, two weeks after the strike started, the company gave in to most of the workers' demands, although it pointedly did not recognize the union.

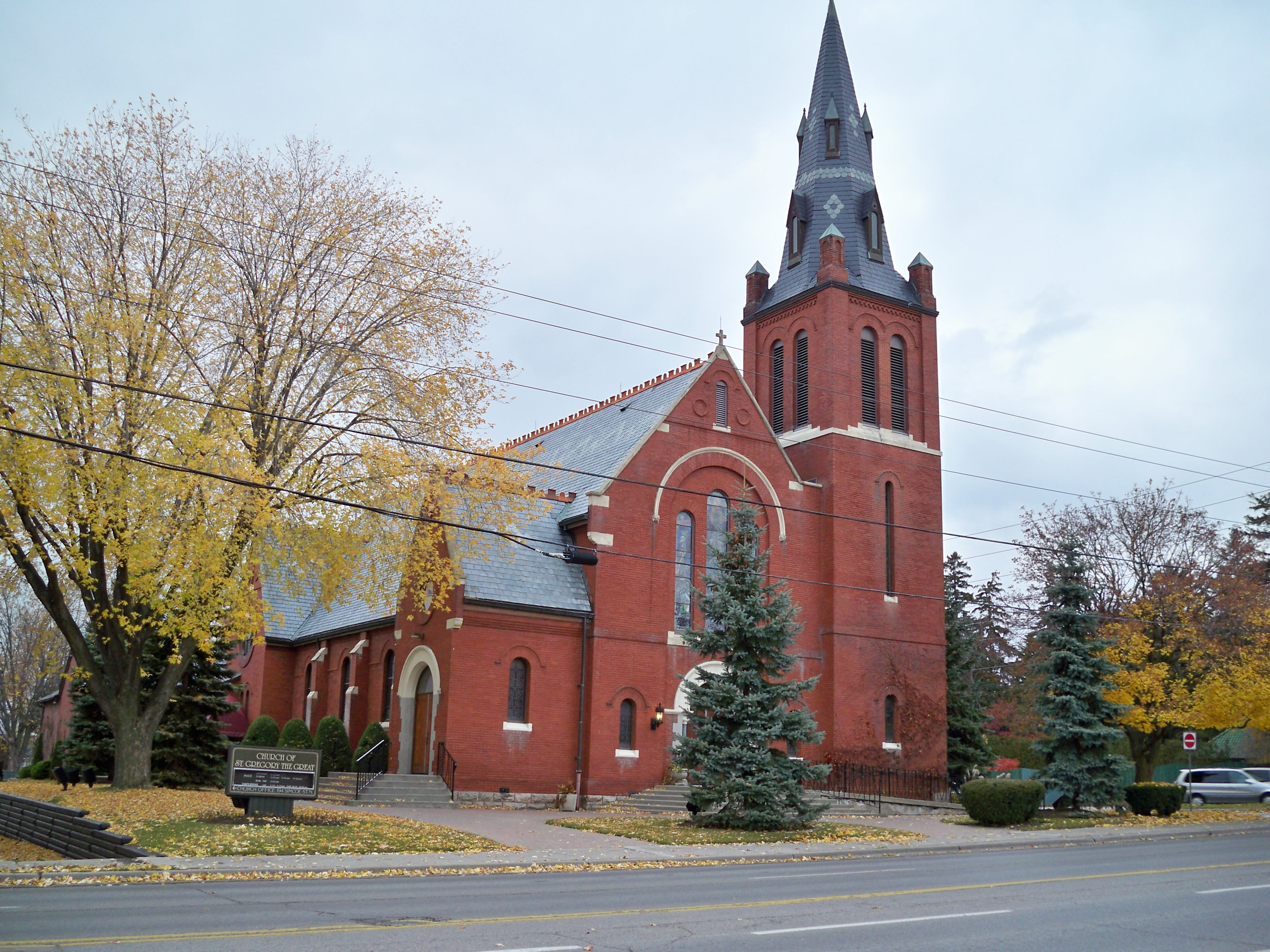
A historic church in Oshawa: St. Gregory the Great

=== Post-war ===
In 1950, the city annexed a portion of East Whitby Township west of Park Road. Some of this area had been developed during the 1920s boom period, although it was not within the boundaries of the city. The opening of the Oshawa Shopping Centre (now the Oshawa Centre) fewer than two kilometres west of the "four corners" in 1956 struck a blow to Oshawa's downtown from which it has never been able to recover. The shopping centre was built on land which had been an unproductive farm; when its owner gave up on agriculture, this released a very large area of land for the construction of a mall. The opening of what later became Highway 401, then known as Highway 2A, shortly after World War II sparked increased residential growth in Oshawa and the other lakeshore municipalities of Ontario County, which led to the creation of the Regional Municipality of Durham in 1974. Oshawa was amalgamated with the remaining portions of East Whitby Township and took on its present boundaries, which included the outlying villages of Columbus, Raglan and Kedron. Much of Oshawa's industry has closed over the years; however, it is still the headquarters of GM Canada and its major manufacturing site. Current industries of note include manufacturing of railway maintenance equipment, mining equipment, steel fabrication, and rubber products. Oshawa is also recognized as an official port of entry for immigration and customs services.

== Climate ==
Similar to all of southern Ontario, Oshawa has a humid continental climate (Köppen climate classification: Dfb) with vast, but not extreme, seasonal temperature differences. Summers are generally warm, while winters are cold, but not extreme by Canadian standards. Oshawa receives one of the lowest yearly snowfall totals in all of Ontario.

Climate data for Oshawa WCPC Climate ID: 6155878; coordinates 43°52′N 78°50′W, elevation: 83.8 m (275 ft); 1991−2020 normals, extremes 1882–present
Month	Jan	Feb	Mar	Apr	May	Jun	Jul	Aug	Sep	Oct	Nov	Dec	Year
Record high °C (°F)	14.0 (57.2)	18.3 (64.9)	23.5 (74.3)	29.5 (85.1)	32.0 (89.6)	34.5 (94.1)	39.4 (102.9)	36.0 (96.8)	34.4 (93.9)	28.2 (82.8)	23.0 (73.4)	16.5 (61.7)	39.4 (102.9)
Mean daily maximum °C (°F)	−1.1 (30.0)	−0.2 (31.6)	4.5 (40.1)	10.6 (51.1)	17.5 (63.5)	22.7 (72.9)	25.7 (78.3)	24.8 (76.6)	20.9 (69.6)	13.6 (56.5)	7.5 (45.5)	2.2 (36.0)	12.4 (54.3)
Daily mean °C (°F)	−5 (23)	−4.2 (24.4)	0.3 (32.5)	6.2 (43.2)	12.6 (54.7)	17.8 (64.0)	20.9 (69.6)	20.1 (68.2)	16.2 (61.2)	9.5 (49.1)	3.9 (39.0)	−1.2 (29.8)	8.1 (46.6)
Mean daily minimum °C (°F)	−8.9 (16.0)	−8.3 (17.1)	−3.9 (25.0)	1.7 (35.1)	7.6 (45.7)	12.9 (55.2)	15.8 (60.4)	15.4 (59.7)	11.4 (52.5)	5.3 (41.5)	0.3 (32.5)	−4.6 (23.7)	3.7 (38.7)
Record low °C (°F)	−32.8 (−27.0)	−34.4 (−29.9)	−28.3 (−18.9)	−17.2 (1.0)	−6.1 (21.0)	0.0 (32.0)	2.8 (37.0)	0.0 (32.0)	−5 (23)	−12.8 (9.0)	−19.4 (−2.9)	−32.2 (−26.0)	−34.4 (−29.9)
Average precipitation mm (inches)	74.7 (2.94)	53.5 (2.11)	53.9 (2.12)	86.9 (3.42)	85.1 (3.35)	94.0 (3.70)	85.8 (3.38)	74.2 (2.92)	86.2 (3.39)	71.8 (2.83)	72.5 (2.85)	67.8 (2.67)	906.3 (35.68)
Average rainfall mm (inches)	41.2 (1.62)	27.7 (1.09)	42.9 (1.69)	85.3 (3.36)	85.1 (3.35)	94.0 (3.70)	85.8 (3.38)	74.2 (2.92)	86.2 (3.39)	71.7 (2.82)	67.4 (2.65)	43.1 (1.70)	804.6 (31.68)
Average snowfall cm (inches)	33.5 (13.2)	25.8 (10.2)	10.9 (4.3)	1.6 (0.6)	0.0 (0.0)	0.0 (0.0)	0.0 (0.0)	0.0 (0.0)	0.0 (0.0)	0.1 (0.0)	5.1 (2.0)	24.7 (9.7)	101.7 (40.0)
Average precipitation days (≥ 0.2 mm)	13.8	10.2	10.6	12.4	12.2	11.8	10.8	10.3	11.0	13.5	13.6	12.9	143.1
Average rainy days (≥ 0.2 mm)	6.0	4.3	7.9	12.1	12.2	11.8	10.8	10.3	11.0	13.5	12.4	7.8	120.1
Average snowy days (≥ 0.2 cm)	8.5	6.8	3.3	0.74	0.0	0.0	0.0	0.0	0.0	0.09	1.6	5.8	26.8
Source: Environment and Climate Change Canada

== Demographics ==
Historical populations
Year	Pop.	±%
1841	1,000	—
1851	1,142	+14.2%
1861	2,009	+75.9%
1871	3,185	+58.5%
1881	3,992	+25.3%
1891	4,066	+1.9%
1901	4,394	+8.1%
1911	7,436	+69.2%
1921	11,940	+60.6%
1931	23,439	+96.3%
1941	26,610	+13.5%
1951	41,545	+56.1%
1956	50,412	+21.3%
1961	62,415	+23.8%
1966	78,082	+25.1%
1971	91,587	+17.3%
1976	107,023	+16.9%
1981	117,519	+9.8%
1986	123,651	+5.2%
1991	129,344	+4.6%
1996	134,364	+3.9%
2001	139,051	+3.5%
2006	141,590	+1.8%
2011	149,607	+5.7%
2016	159,458	+6.6%
2021	175,383	+10.0%

In the 2021 Census of Population conducted by Statistics Canada, Oshawa had a population of 175,383 living in 66,634 of its 69,324 total private dwellings, a change of 10% from its 2016 population of 159,458. With a land area of 145.72 km^{2} (56.26 sq mi), it had a population density of 1,203.6/km^{2} (3,117.2/sq mi) in 2021.

At the census metropolitan area (CMA) level in the 2021 census, the Oshawa CMA had a population of 415,311 living in 149,047 of its 153,565 total private dwellings, a change of 9.3% from its 2016 population of 379,848. With a land area of 903.25 km^{2} (348.75 sq mi), it had a population density of 459.8/km^{2} (1,190.9/sq mi) in 2021.

=== Religion ===
Largest non-Christian religion in Oshawa CMA by census tract based on the 2021 census

Religious profile 2021:

- Total Christian: 51.4%
  - Protestant: 15.3%
  - Catholic: 22.3%
  - Christian N.O.S: 8.6%
  - Other Christian/Christian related traditions: 3.7%
  - Christian Orthodox: 1.4%
- Muslim: 5.8%
- Hindu: 3.7%
- Other Religions/Spiritual Traditions: 0.7%
- Buddhist: 0.5%
- Sikh: 0.4%
- No Religion/Secular: 37.3%

=== Language ===
According to the 2021 Census English was the mother tongue of 79.5% of the residents of Oshawa. 1.7% of the population had French as their mother tongue. Other common mother tongues were Urdu (1.5%), Chinese Languages (1.3%), Tamil (1.2%), Tagalog (1.0%), Spanish (1.0%), Polish (0.8%), and Italian (0.7%).

=== Ethnicity ===
Largest ethnic origin in Oshawa CMA by census tract based on the 2021 census

Ethnic origin 2021 (multiple responses included)	Population	Per cent
English	38,940	22.4%
Irish	30,810	17.7%
Scottish	30,415	17.5%
Canadian	29,445	16.9%
German	11,470	6.6%
French	11,220	6.4%
Italian	8,635	5.0%
Indian (India)	7,445	4.3%
British Isles N.O.S	7,415	4.3%
Polish	5,785	3.3%
Dutch (Netherlands)	5,405	3.1%
Jamaican	5,315	3.1%
Ukrainian	5,120	2.9%
Filipino	4,545	2.6%

In 2006, 8.1% of the residents were visible minorities, 37.4% of whom were Black Canadians.

Panethnic groups in the City of Oshawa (2001−2021)
Panethnic group	2021		2016		2011		2006		2001	
Panethnic group	Pop.	%	Pop.	%	Pop.	%	Pop.	%	Pop.	%
European (Note: Statistic includes all persons that did not make up part of a visible minority or an indigenous identity.)	118,405	68.04%	127,740	81.04%	130,945	88.67%	126,355	90.1%	127,695	92.63%
South Asian	16,240	9.33%	6,035	3.83%	2,790	1.89%	1,905	1.36%	1,780	1.29%
African	15,425	8.86%	8,715	5.53%	4,675	3.17%	4,260	3.04%	3,085	2.24%
Indigenous	5,325	3.06%	4,645	2.95%	2,940	1.99%	2,515	1.79%	1,810	1.31%
Southeast Asian (Note: Statistic includes total responses of "Filipino" and "Southeast Asian" under visible minority section on census.)	5,095	2.93%	2,600	1.65%	1,735	1.17%	1,035	0.74%	815	0.59%
East Asian (Note: Statistic includes total responses of "Chinese", "Korean", and "Japanese" under visible minority section on census.)	3,725	2.14%	2,595	1.65%	1,665	1.13%	1,750	1.25%	1,175	0.85%
Middle Eastern (Note: Statistic includes total responses of "West Asian" and "Arab" under visible minority section on census.)	3,375	1.94%	1,575	1%	740	0.5%	760	0.54%	355	0.26%
Latin American	2,280	1.31%	1,260	0.8%	1,060	0.72%	710	0.51%	460	0.33%
Other/Multiracial (Note: Statistic includes total responses of "Visible minority, n.i.e." and "Multiple visible minorities" under visible minority section on census.)	4,140	2.38%	2,460	1.56%	1,130	0.77%	945	0.67%	680	0.49%
Total responses	174,010	99.22%	157,630	98.85%	147,680	98.71%	140,240	99.05%	137,860	99.14%
Total population	175,383	100%	159,458	100%	149,607	100%	141,590	100%	139,051	100%
Note: Totals greater than 100% due to multiple origin responses

== Economy ==
Oshawa is headquarters to General Motors Canada, which has large-scale manufacturing and administrative operations in the city and employs many thousands both directly and indirectly. Since Windsor, Ontario houses Chrysler Canada headquarters, the two cities have something of a friendly rivalry for the title of "Automotive Capital of Canada", which is now held by Oshawa. While the company's once essential role in the local economy has diminished, it remains the largest local employer. In November 2018, General Motors announced the closing of the plant, with the layoff of both salaried and hourly workers. On 20 December 2018 the last car was assembled at the Oshawa plant. On 4 November 2020, GM announced "Subject to ratification of the 2020 agreement with Unifor, General Motors plans to bring pickup production back to the Oshawa Assembly Plant. Construction will begin immediately at Oshawa Assembly and will include a new body shop and flexible assembly module, to support a fast response to strong customer demand for GM's new family of pickup trucks. The Oshawa plant produced its first pickup on in 2021, a Chevy Silverado.

The revenue collection divisions of the Ontario Ministry of Finance occupy one of the main office buildings in the city's downtown. Oshawa City Hall, Tribute Communities Centre, The Robert McLaughlin Gallery are also in the downtown core. Ontario Tech University occupies five buildings in downtown. More than 1,900 Ontario Tech University students and staff attend class and work in downtown Oshawa.

Oshawa has become one of the fastest-growing cities in Canada, although statements to this effect are often in reference to the Census Metropolitan Area, which includes neighbouring Whitby and Clarington. Oshawa achieved a record-setting year of growth in 2015 with over a half a billion dollars in construction value (breaking its previous record in 2014). Many commuters have been enticed to Oshawa by comparatively low housing prices and the regular rail service into downtown Toronto provided by GO Transit and Via Rail.

The growth of subdivisions to house Toronto commuters will likely accelerate with the Highway 407 East extension. Highway 407 East (407E) opened to Harmony Road in Oshawa on 20 June 2016, including a tolled north–south link to Highway 401 known as Highway 412. The Highway 407 extension to Highway 35/Highway 115 in Clarington was opened on 9 December 2019, with a second tolled link to Highway 401 known as Highway 418 opened simultaneously. On 5 April 2022, Highways 412 and 418 became toll-free.

In spring 2016, Oshawa was ranked No. 1 city for jobs in Canada when compared to 33 cities across the country. The trend suggests major social and demographic changes for Oshawa, which has long had a vigorous labour union presence, a mostly white demographic, and a largely blue collar identity.

The city has been attracting film and television producers who have made parts of a number of movies and TV series in Oshawa, most recently It (based on the Stephen King book), but also Billy Madison, Chicago, and X-Men. The most popular location in the city for film makers is Parkwood Estate.

== Politics ==
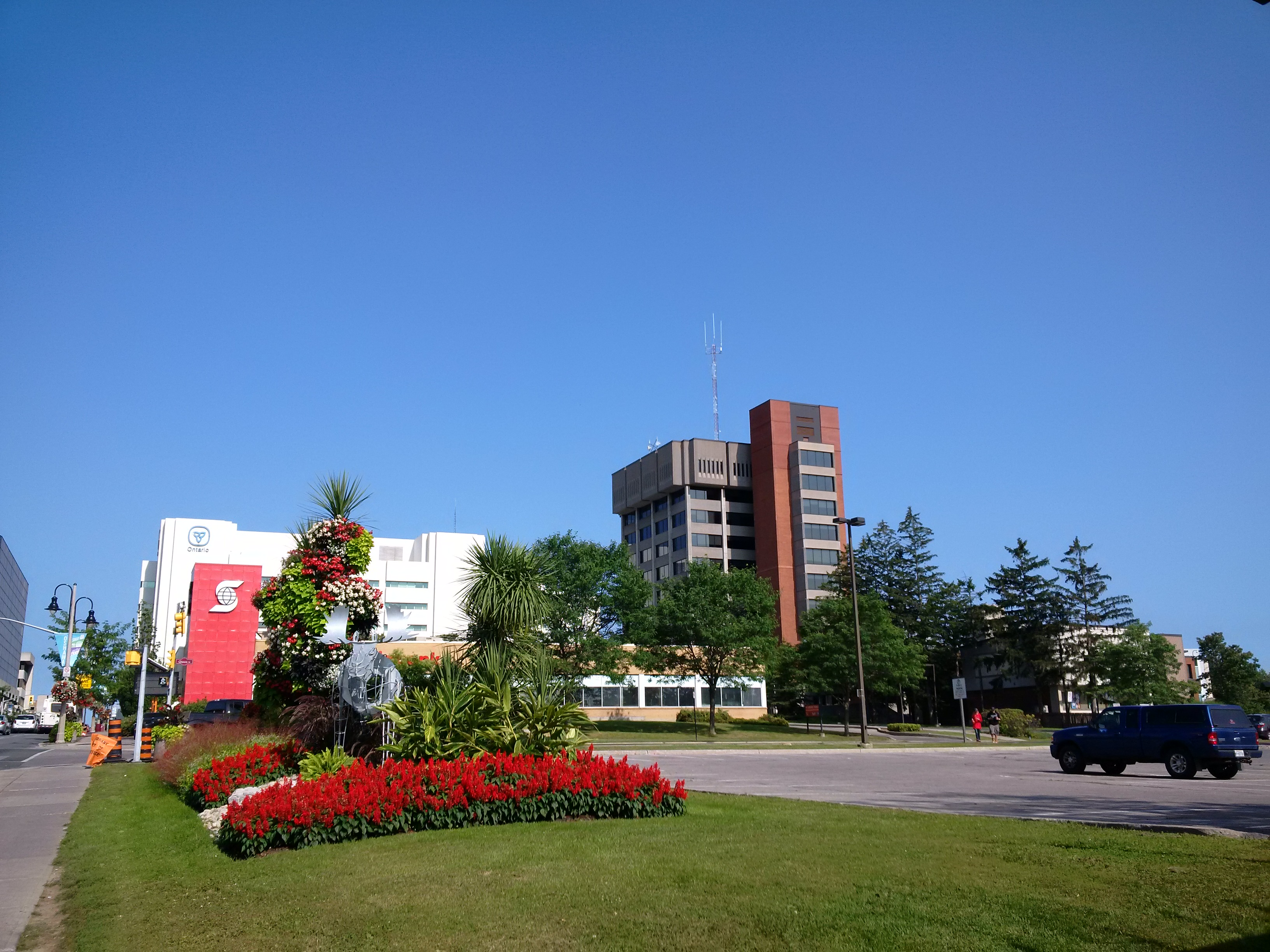
Oshawa City Hall

Oshawa Riding federal election results
Year	Liberal		Conservative		New Democratic		Green	
2025	43%	28,653	48.2%	32,131	7.7%	5,112	1.2%	804
2021	26%	18,878	39%	28,108	26%	18,894	1%	864
2019	29%	22,986	38%	30,375	26%	20,936	5%	3,900

Bowmanville-Oshawa North federal election results
Year	Liberal		Conservative		New Democratic		Green	
2025	45.5%	32,214	49.8%	35,232	2.9%	2,032	0.8%	546

Oshawa Riding provincial election results
Year	PC		New Democratic		Liberal		Green	
2025	41.5%	18,442	45.9%	20,367	8.8%	3,891	2.1%	916
2022	40%	16,423	42%	17,170	9%	3,726	4%	1,641
2018	42%	28,508	43%	29,258	9%	6,385	4%	2,407

Durham Riding provincial election results
Year	PC		New Democratic		Liberal		Green	
2025	50.5%	26,969	14.3%	7,635	29.4%	15,701	2.4%	1,280

The dominant presence of General Motors (and its autoworkers) meant that Oshawa was well known as a bastion of unionist, left-wing support during the decades following the Second World War. The city played an important role in Canada's labour history, including the 1937 "Oshawa Strike" against General Motors and the considerable financial support provided by the city's autoworkers to the New Democratic Party (NDP) and its predecessors.

However, Oshawa was part of the Ontario (County) riding when Michael Starr served. Starr was a high ranking Progressive Conservative Member of Parliament (MP) and Cabinet Member during the Diefenbaker era. Starr served the new Oshawa-Whitby riding for one term, before being narrowly defeated by future federal NDP leader Ed Broadbent in 1968. Broadbent then represented the city in the House of Commons until 1989, and in the 1980s led the NDP to its greatest electoral successes.

By the end of the 1990s, the city's changing economy and demographics led many voters to the Progressive Conservative Party of Ontario and the Canadian Alliance, a conservative party at the federal level. Conservative candidates have won recent provincial and federal elections, whereas from 1968 to 1993 the city was a safe NDP seat in both the federal and provincial legislatures.

The city's shifting social and political dynamics were seen in the 2004 federal election the riding of Oshawa (not coterminous with the City of Oshawa, but containing most of it) was the country's most competitive. The candidate of the new Conservative Party of Canada, Colin Carrie, edged out his NDP rival Sid Ryan by several hundred votes; it was an atypical and ideologically stark race that left Louise Parkes of the Liberals in third place.

In 2006, Whitby-Oshawa also became a Conservative seat Jim Flaherty followed Starr (after over 40 years) into the Cabinet of Canada as Minister of Finance.

In 2014, Jennifer French of the Ontario New Democratic Party was elected as Member of Provincial Parliament in the provincial riding of Oshawa with over 40% of the vote.

=== Local government ===
Interactive map of Oshawa electoral wards

The council of the City of Oshawa has eleven members – one mayor, five regional and city councillors and five city councillors. The current term of council began on 15 November 2022.

The mayor is elected at large by electors throughout the city, heads the council of the City of Oshawa and is also a representative of the city on the council of the Regional Municipality of Durham. There are five wards in the City of Oshawa. Each of the five wards are represented by one regional and city councillor and one city councillor.

There are four standing committees of council:

1. Community & Operations Services Committee
2. Corporate & Finance Services Committee
3. Economic & Development Services Committee
4. Safety & Facilities Services Committee

=== Neighbourhoods ===
Interactive map of Oshawa neighbourhoods

The city comprises following communities or neighbourhoods:

- Beaton
- Centennial
- Central
- Columbus
- Donevan
- Eastdale
- Farewell
- Kedron
- Lakeview
- McLaughlin
- NorthGlen
- Northwood
- O'Neill
- Pinecrest
- Raglan
- Rural Area
- Samac
- Stevenson
- Taunton
- Vanier
- Windfields

== Attractions ==
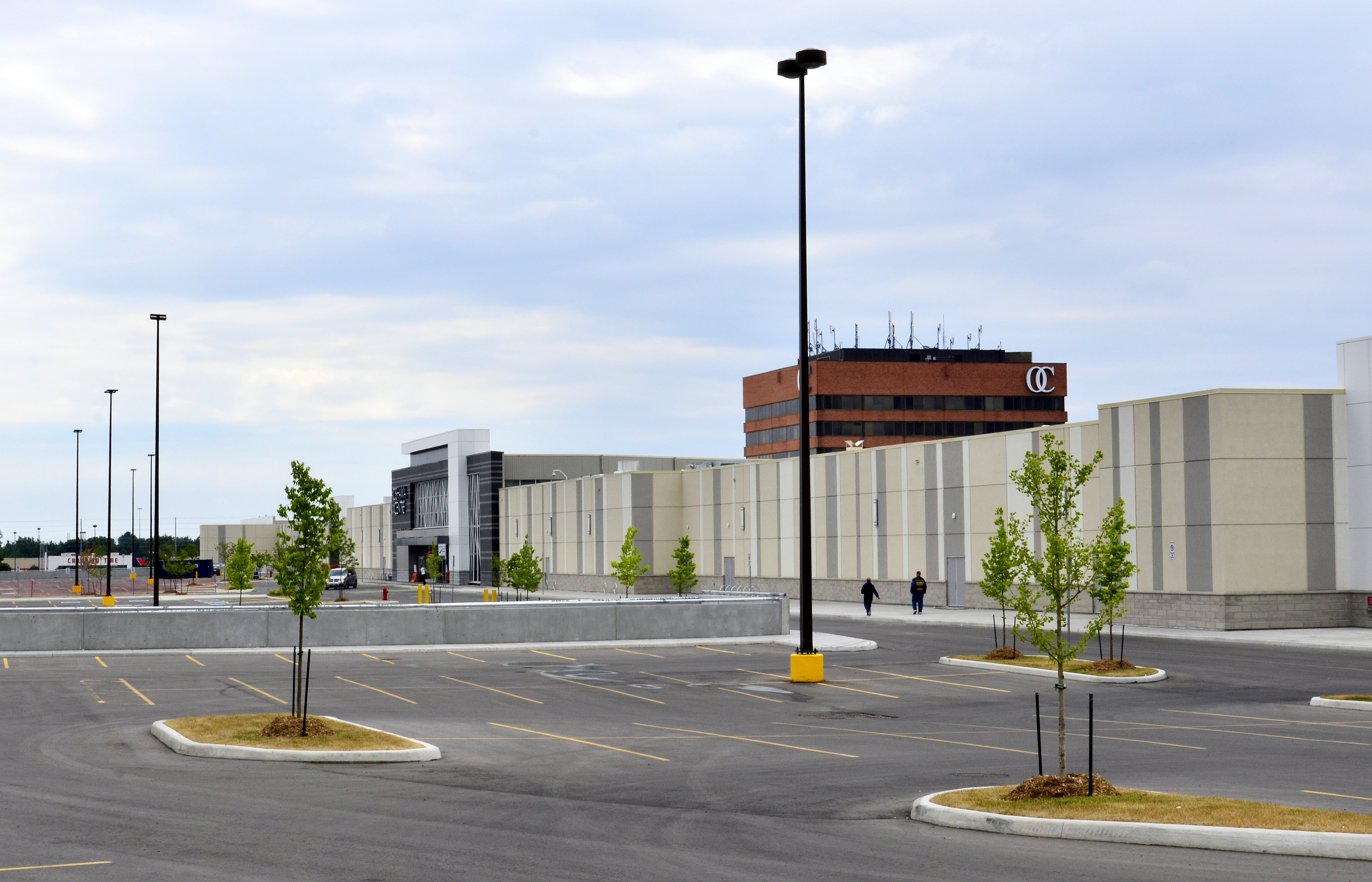
Oshawa Centre, the largest mall in Ontario east of Toronto

Oshawa has parks, walking trails, conservation areas, indoors and outdoor public swimming pools, community centres, and sports facilities. Lakeview Park stretches along the coast of Lake Ontario, complete with a sandy beach, and is the location of the Oshawa Museum. Also, the McLaughlin Bay Wildlife Reserve and Second Marsh Wildlife Area offer protected marshland areas with interpretive trails and viewing platforms. Oshawa's parks and trail system encompasses almost 410 hectares (1,000 acres) of parkland and more than 27 kilometres (17 mi) of paved trails. Oshawa has more than 130 parks, more than 110 playgrounds, nine splash pads, eight ice pads and three skateboard parks.

- Canadian Automotive Museum
- Ontario Regiment RCAC Museum
- The Robert McLaughlin Gallery
- Tribute Communities Centre
- Oshawa Museum
- Parkwood Estate

Oshawa hosts many annual festivals and events including the Oshawa Peony Festival, Kars on King, and Oshawa Fiesta Week, which is hosted by the Oshawa Folk Arts Council and has been celebrated for more than 45 years.

At the centre of Oshawa is the Oshawa Centre shopping mall, the largest mall in the Durham region as well as in Ontario east of Toronto. The executive offices there include the Ministry of Long Term Health Care for Ontario.

== Sports ==
=== Hockey ===
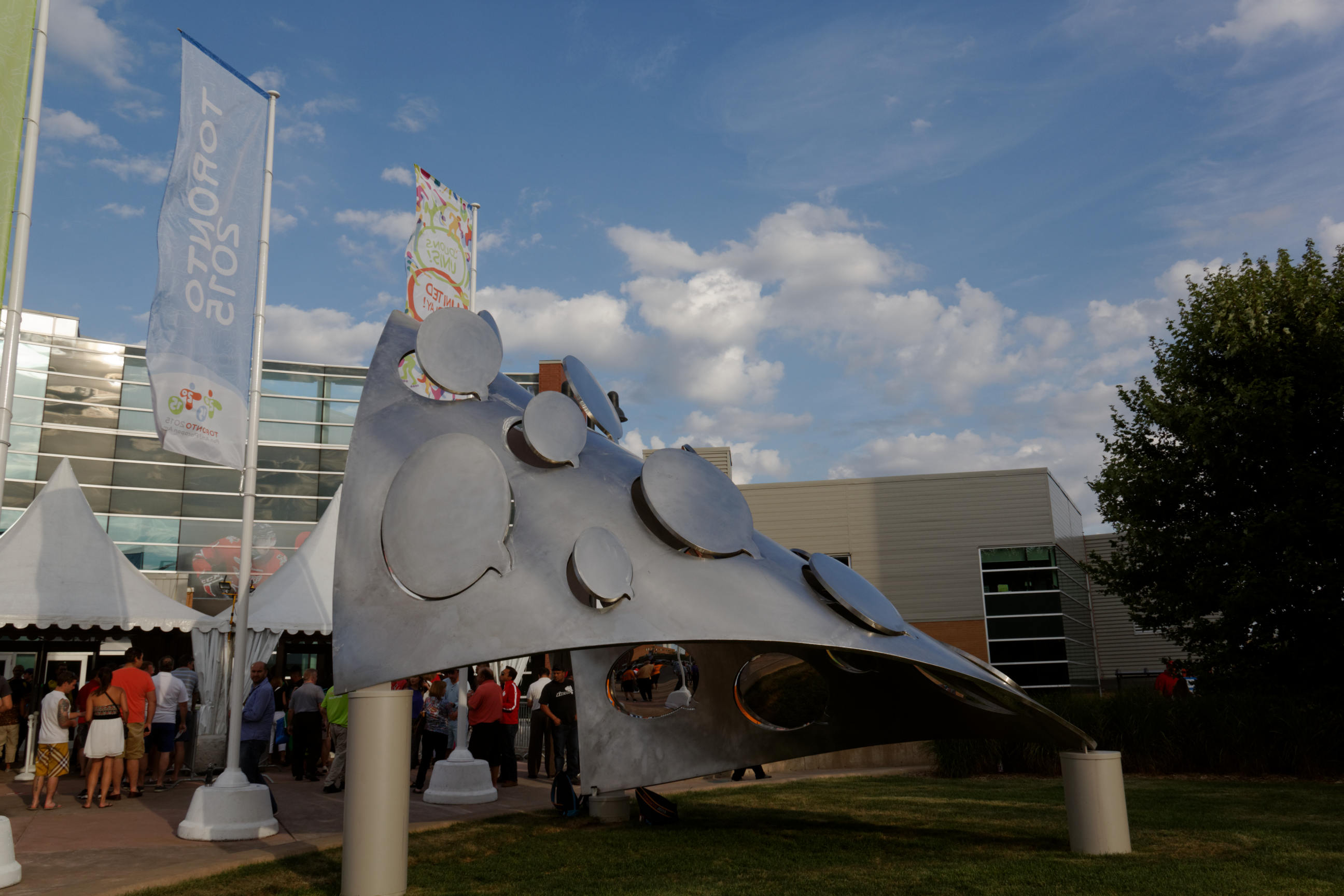
Art at Oshawa Arena

Oshawa is home to the Oshawa Generals of the Ontario Hockey League. In 2015, the Oshawa Generals won the Ontario Hockey League Championship, and ended their season winning the 2015 Memorial Cup.

Famous alumni of this team include Bobby Orr, Alex Delvecchio, Wayne Cashman, Tony Tanti, Dave Andreychuk, Marc Savard, Eric Lindros, and John Tavares. The team moved from the Oshawa Civic Auditorium into the new General Motors Centre in November 2006. In 2016 the city of Oshawa partnered with Tribute Communities for naming rights and the General Motors Centre was renamed the Tribute Communities Centre.

The Oshawa Generals' home arena has been destroyed by fire twice in the franchise history. In June 1928, the Bradley Arena was destroyed by fire. Then, 25 years later, in September 1953 the Hambly Arena was also destroyed by fire.

Oshawa hosted Ron MacLean and the Rogers Hometown Hockey Tour on 26–27 December 2015.

In September 2018, the city hosted its first National Hockey League preseason game, when the Buffalo Sabres and New York Islanders played an exhibition contest.

=== Basketball ===
The Oshawa Power of the National Basketball League of Canada began playing in October 2011. In the spring of 2013, the Power announced a move from Oshawa to Mississauga, a western suburb of Toronto. The Power played home games at the General Motors Centre.

=== Lacrosse ===
Oshawa was home of the Oshawa Green Gaels, one of the most storied teams in the sport. A player of note in the 1920s was Nels Stewart, who became a Hall of Famer in the National Hockey League. Former Oshawa Green Gaels captain and Oshawa native, Derek Keenan, is the current coach and general manager of the Saskatchewan Rush. He was inducted into the Canadian Lacrosse Hall of Fame in 2012.

In August of 2025, it was announced that the former Albany FireWolves of the National Lacrosse League would be relocating to the city, sharing the Tribute Communities Centre with the Oshawa Generals as FireWolves Lacrosse Club.

=== Soccer ===
The city was represented in the Canadian Professional Soccer League by the Durham Flames from 1999 to 2003. After the Flames had their franchise revoked in 2004, the Mississauga Olympians relocated to Oshawa to become the Durham Storm. The Storm would represent Oshawa for two seasons from 2004 to 2005.

=== Other ===
Oshawa was home to Windfields Farm, a thoroughbred horse breeding operation and birthplace of one of Canada's most famous racehorses, Northern Dancer.

Oshawa hosted boxing and weightlifting events for the 2015 Pan American Games which were held in the Greater Toronto Area.

== Transportation ==
Highway 401 in Oshawa

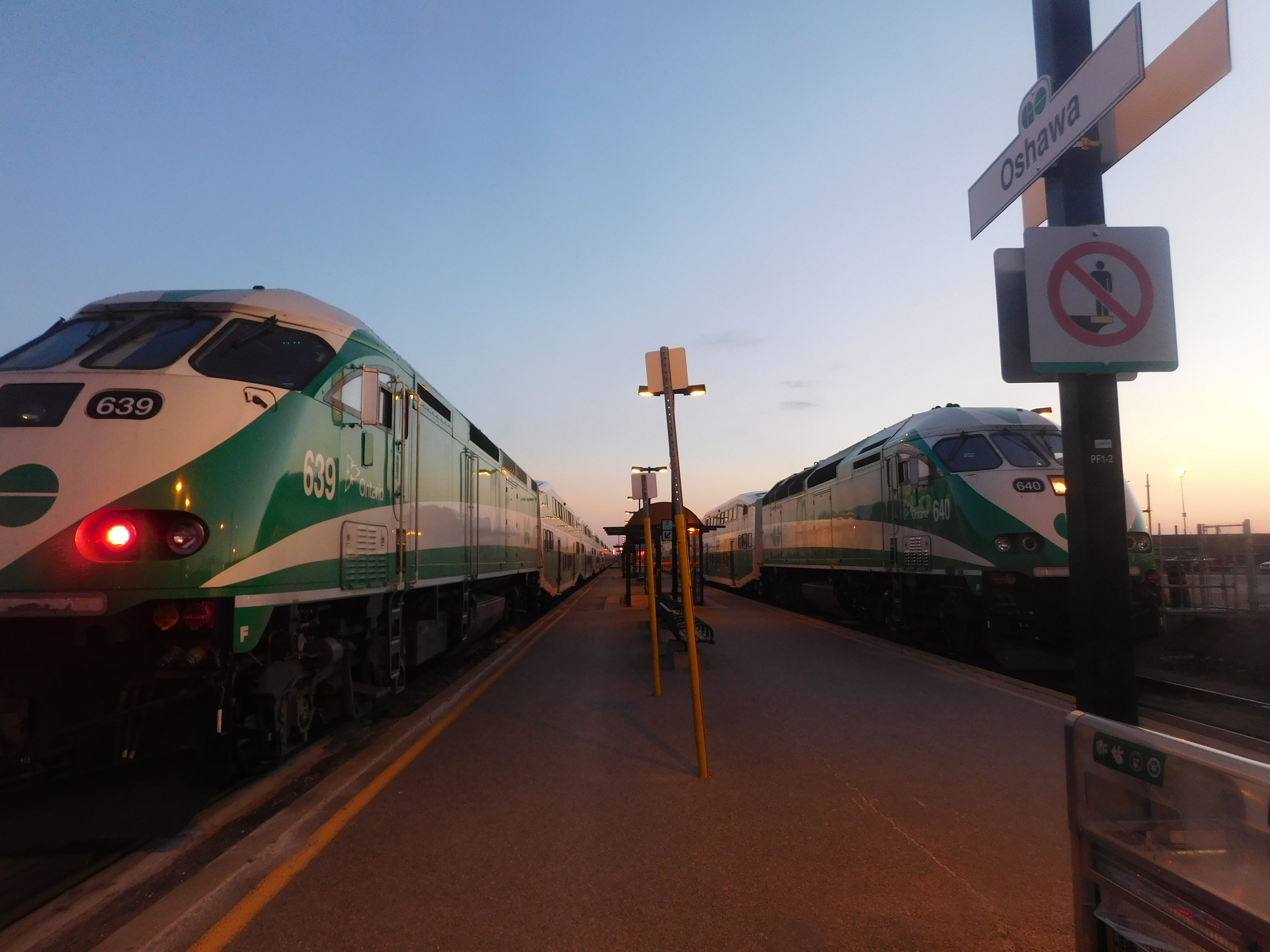
Oshawa Train Station

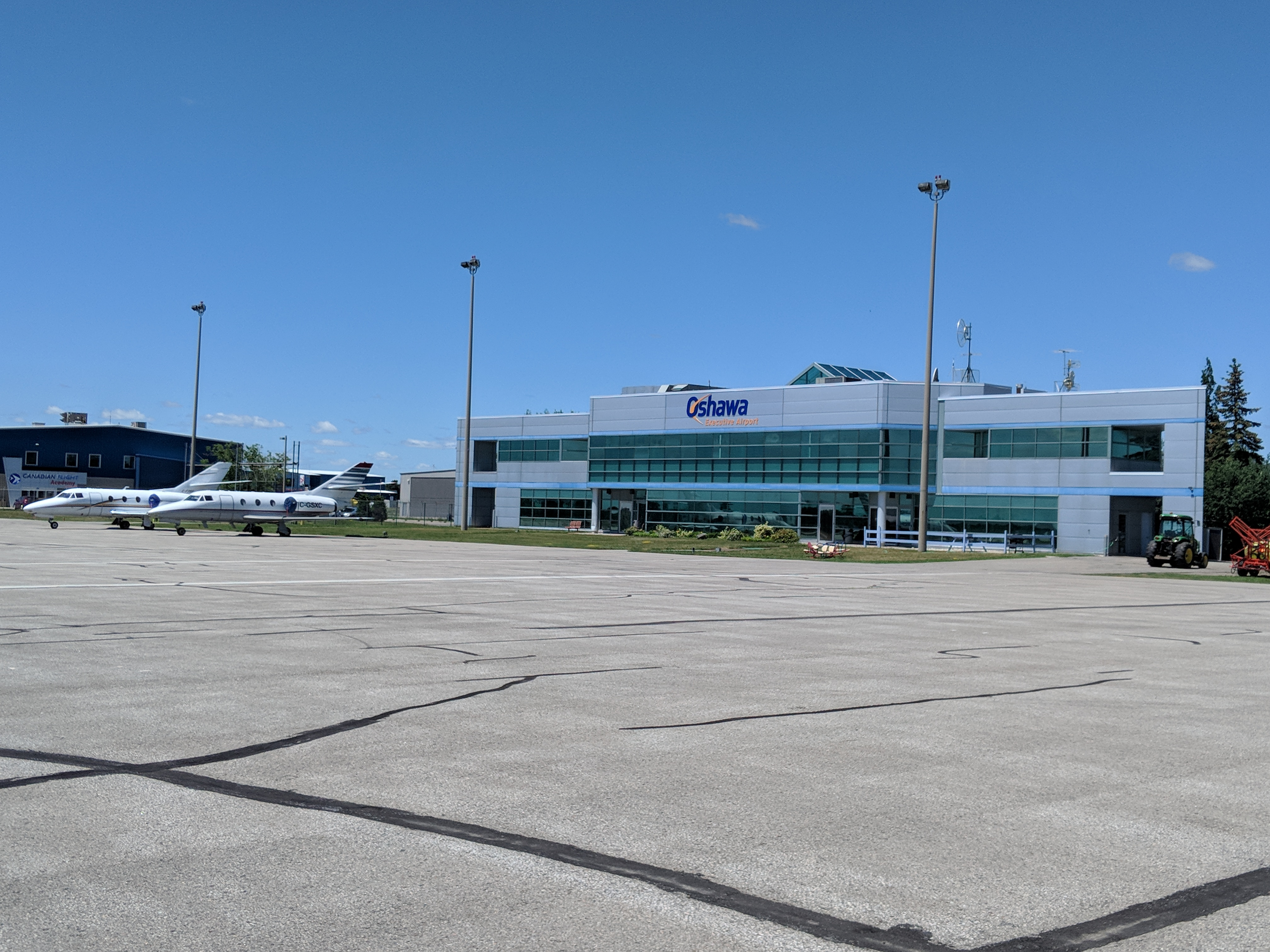
Main Terminal at the Oshawa Executive Airport

GO Transit trains connect the city with Toronto, Hamilton and points between. GO Transit buses provide service from Oshawa along the Highway 401 and Highway 2 corridors in Durham Region and to Toronto and York Region. GO Transit bus service is also provided from Oshawa Train station to Clarington and Peterborough via the downtown bus terminal. The Oshawa Station is owned by the national rail carrier Via Rail, which operates a service along the Quebec City-Windsor Corridor. Other services from the station include GO Buses, and the regional transit system Durham Region Transit provides local bus service. It replaced Oshawa Transit on 1 January 2006.

The province announced in June 2016 an extension of the GO train service from Oshawa to Bowmanville, including extending the train network by nearly 20 kilometres (12 mi) and building four new stations. The new GO rail service is expected to begin by 2023–24. The four new stations will be at Thornton Road in Oshawa, Ritson Road in Oshawa, Courtice Road in Courtice and Martin Road in Bowmanville.

Rail freight is carried on the Canadian National and Canadian Pacific Railways which traverse the city.

Other than Highway 2 (King and Bond Streets), which was downloaded in 1998, the city had no provincially maintained highways until the original section of Highway 401 opened in 1947 (as Highway 2A). The highway originally terminated at Ritson Road, and was extended east through the remainder of the city to Newcastle in 1952. Oshawa was the only city that Highway 401 was built directly through, rather than bypassing. This resulted in the demolition of several streets and hundreds of homes in the 1930s and 1940s.

Highway 407, a tolled 400-series highway, opened to Harmony Road in Oshawa on 20 June 2016, including a tolled north–south link to Highway 401 known as Highway 412. A recently completed segment east of the city opened in 2020, connecting to Highway 35 / Highway 115 in Clarington by 2020, with a second link to Highway 401 known as Highway 418.

The Port of Oshawa is a major stop for the auto and steel industries as well as winter road salt handling and agricultural fertilizer. A marine rescue unit (COMRA) is also stationed at the port. On 21 May 2009, Canadian Transportation Minister John Baird announced that the status of Oshawa's port would be changed from a harbour commission to a full-fledged Port Authority. The creation of a federal port authority has caused some controversy as there are others who wish to see the port transferred to municipal ownership and recreational use.

Oshawa Executive Airport is a municipal airport owned by the city that operates all private general aviation and charter services for eastern Toronto, with customs and immigration officers on-site. Oshawa Executive does not offer any scheduled airline services. The closest international airports with scheduled service is Toronto Pearson International Airport, located 75 kilometres (47 mi) west by road in Mississauga or Billy Bishop Toronto City Airport in downtown Toronto.

== Infrastructure ==
=== Health care ===
Oshawa is the site of Lakeridge Health Oshawa, formerly Oshawa General Hospital. Lakeridge Health is one of Ontario's largest community hospitals. The facility also houses the RS. McLaughlin Durham Regional Cancer Centre.

Lakeridge Health Oshawa is also home to Lakeridge Health Education and Research Network (LHEARN) that opened in 2013. LHEARN is the academic home for Queen's University family physician residency program and for pediatric residency and training. LHEARN Centre provides training and testing medical professionals, including doctors, nurses and first responders (including Ornge critical care air ambulance paramedics).

Oshawa is also home to the Oshawa Clinic, the largest, multi-specialty medical group practice in Canada.

On 24 April 2020, General Motors Canada reopened the city's local plant in order to manufacture Personal protective equipment for healthcare workers treating patients infected with COVID-19 during the 2019–20 coronavirus pandemic.

=== Emergency services ===
Policing in Oshawa is provided by the Durham Regional Police Service. There are two police stations in Oshawa one at 77 Centre Street North in the downtown area, and a South Oshawa Community Policing Centre on Cedar Street. EMS/Ambulance services are also operated by the Region of Durham. Oshawa Fire Services operated by the city operates from six fire stations located throughout the city.

Oshawa was the first city in Ontario to provide paramedic services. In 1979, 16 ambulance attendants were given specialized training to treat cardiac related problems in the pre-hospital setting. The program was called the Pre-hospital Cardiac Care (PHCC) program. From this single service, paramedic training was expanded to Toronto, Hamilton and the Provincial air ambulance service. The program has been the source of all paramedic programs in Ontario.

== Education ==
Public education in Oshawa is provided by the Durham District School Board. As of June 2015, there were 28 elementary schools and six secondary schools. The Durham Catholic District School Board, which has its headquarters in Oshawa, oversees public Catholic education in Durham Region. There are 11 Catholic elementary schools and two secondary schools. The Conseil scolaire Viamonde operates one French public elementary school, while the Conseil scolaire de district catholique Centre-Sud runs one publicly funded French-language Catholic elementary school. Private schools include Durham Elementary School, Immanuel Christian School, Kingsway College and College Park Elementary School.

Oshawa is home to 22,000 full-time students studying at three post-secondary institutions: Durham College, Trent University Durham and Ontario Tech University. Oshawa is a Community Teaching Site for Queen's University School of Medicine at Lakeridge Health.

The main campus of Durham College is located in the city. The college has grown and expanded since it opened in 1967 and now offers more than 140 full-time programs.

Ontario Tech University, opened in 2003, is also located in Oshawa. Given the city's industrial heritage, the university's courses emphasize technology, manufacturing and engineering themes. Ontario Tech has ten buildings at two stand-alone campus locations (north Oshawa and Downtown Oshawa) and houses more than 70 specialized research laboratories and research facilities. It is the only university in Canada to offer a degree program in Automotive Engineering.

In 2010, Trent University opened a stand-alone campus in Oshawa known as Trent University Durham (beside the Oshawa Civic Recreation Complex).

== Media ==
Oshawa has few media outlets of its own due to its proximity to Toronto. The city has one AM station, CKDO (1580), which is rebroadcast on 107.7 FM, and one FM station, 94.9 CKGE. Both stations are owned by Durham Radio, which also owns CJKX, which is licensed to the nearby community of Ajax, although all three stations are operated from the same studios at the Oshawa Executive Airport. CKDO has officially been licensed as a clear-channel station since 2006 and is the only full-power station in Canada on 1580 kHz it nonetheless operates at a fifth of the usual power of a clear-channel outlet with a directional signal that is pointed away from the United States.

Oshawa has a Global O&O station, CHEX-TV-2 (Channel 12), which is a sister station of Peterborough's CHEX-DT. It airs a daily supper hour news and current affairs program targeted to Durham Region viewers. Although a larger city than Peterborough then and now, Oshawa was not granted a television station in the original 1950s assignments as it was geographically too close to Toronto, since the original spacings were nominally set at 88 km (55 mi). Rogers Cable, the local cable television service provider, operates Rogers TV: a community channel with local television programming for cable subscribers.

Oshawa is served by several community newspapers, including the Oshawa Express, an independent which is published every Wednesday, and Oshawa This Week, published two times per week by Metroland. The long-standing daily newspaper, the Oshawa Times (also known at various times as the Oshawa Daily Times and Times-Gazette), was closed by its owner Thomson Newspapers, after a lengthy strike in 1994.

John Short Larke was the proprietor of the Oshawa Vindicator, a strongly pro-Conservative newspaper, in the late 19th century.

Oshawa is home to Artsforum Magazine, a not-for-profit magazine of arts and ideas launched in Fall 2000 by John Arkelian, its publisher and editor-in-chief. Topics in the magazine range from foreign policy to film.

== Notable people ==
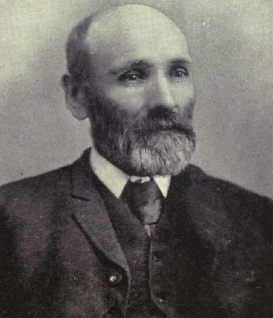
Robert McLaughlin

- Sean Avery, NHL hockey player
- Sherwood Bassin, general manager in the Ontario Hockey League
- Mars Bonfire, member of Steppenwolf
- Daniel Caesar, singer-songwriter
- Lloyd Chadburn, Canadian World War II fighter pilot
- Allysha Chapman, soccer player for the Canada national team
- A. J. Cook, actress
- Justin Danforth, ice hockey player
- Steve Dangle, internet and sports personality
- Jerry Edmonton, member of Steppenwolf
- Shirley Eikhard, songwriter "Something to Talk About"
- Evangeline Lydia Emsley, nurse in World War I
- Elijah Fisher, basketball player
- Andil Gosine, artist, curator, and scholar
- Shalom Harlow, Canadian supermodel and actress
- Sandy Hawley, horse jockey
- Kathryn Humphreys, sports anchor
- Donald Jackson, figure skater who won the bronze at the 1960 Olympics
- Lennon & Maisy, country music duo, songwriters and actresses. Star as Maddie & Daphne Conrad on the ABC musical drama series Nashville
- Matt Leyden, manager of Oshawa Generals and Ontario Hockey Association president
- Courtney MacIntosh, Canadian rower
- John J. McLaughlin, son of Robert McLaughlin and inventor of Canada Dry Pale Ginger Ale
- Robert McLaughlin, founder of the McLaughlin Motor Car Company, which became a major part of General Motors Canada.
- Samuel McLaughlin, businessman, philanthropist, founder of McLaughlin Motor Car Company
- Freddie Dredd, rapper, singer, producer, and songwriter
- John Part, three-time World Darts Champion
- George Pettit, Oshawa fireman and lead singer of the band Alexisonfire
- Stephen Poloz, Governor of the Bank of Canada
- James Edward Quigley, Bishop of Buffalo and Archbishop of Chicago
- Bill Siksay, politician and queer activist
- The Stellas, country music duo and songwriters
- Albert W. Tucker, mathematician
- Barbara Underhill, figure skater
- Tonya Lee Williams, actress
- Liam Greentree, ice hockey player
- W. Earle McLaughlin, Chairman of the Royal Bank
- Mark Henkelman, MRI research, biophysics
- Phil Hanley, stand up comedian and model

== See also ==
- Broken Arts
- Camp X
- Oshawa Car Assembly
- Oshawa Truck Assembly
