= 2003–2004 Liberal Party of Canada infighting =

Series of issues in political party

The period between Paul Martin's assumption of the leadership of the Liberal Party of Canada (November 14, 2003) and the announcement of the 2004 federal election (May 23, 2004) saw a considerable amount of infighting within the party. The divisions in the Liberal Party, the party's embroilment in the Sponsorship Scandal, and a united Conservative opposition, all combined to end 12 years of Liberal rule in the 2006 federal election.

== 1990 Convention ==
Jean Chrétien and Martin squared off in the 1990 leadership convention after Turner announced his pending resignation.

The Meech Lake Accord had been a potentially divisive issue for the Liberals. Trudeau came out of retirement to campaign against the Accord, while Turner and Martin declared their support for it. While Turner had privately opposed many of Trudeau's policies while in Cabinet, Meech Lake was seen as one of the signs of open disagreement among both factions.

Chrétien himself said that he never forgave Martin for some of the "wounds" that the latter inflicted; the most notable was during a leadership debate when Martin supporters shouted "vendu", a French insult meaning sellout.

Although Chrétien won on the first ballot, Martin had a strong second-place showing, which allowed him to force concessions. Martin played a major role in drafting policy during the 1993 federal election. The Liberals, as it turned out, won a landslide majority government, and Martin was appointed to the key post of Minister of Finance.

== Chrétien government ==
The Liberals were re-elected with a razor-thin majority in the 1997 campaign, although they were still by far the largest party in the House of Commons. Several MPs such as Reg Alcock had opposed the timing of the vote, in wake of the devastating Red River Flood in Manitoba. Others felt that it was too early to call an election, since the government had only been in power for three and a half years, and the resulting drop in Liberal support likely undermined confidence in Chrétien's leadership of the party.

Rumours of a division between Chrétien and Martin intensified around the 2000 election, with Martin's supporters wanting to take over before the campaign. However, the party managed to win almost as many seats as in 1993 (at the expense of all the other political parties) persuading Chrétien to stay on. Around this time, Martin had worked throughout this time to position himself as the clear successor to Chrétien, ensuring that most of the institutions of the Liberal Party were controlled by his allies.

=== Chrétien-Martin split ===
The dispute between the two men came to a head in the summer of 2002, when Chrétien tried to curtail Martin's open campaigning for the leadership. What ensued is of some debate. Martin claims that he was fired from cabinet by Chrétien, which is what was widely reported in the media, while Chrétien claims that Martin had resigned. In either case, Martin's departure from cabinet aided his leadership campaign since he did not have to disclose donors, unlike Martin's rivals (John Manley, Allan Rock, and Sheila Copps) who were still in cabinet and were thus obliged to follow the rules. Martin's influence and the backlash from his dismissal compelled Chrétien to set a date for his retirement. After Martin's dismissal/resignation, he toured the country campaigning for the leadership while his Liberal organizers prepared to challenge Chrétien during a review vote in January 2003. During the fall, Chrétien announced that he would step down in February 2004 after less than half of caucus agreed to sign a commitment supporting him.

Shortly before Chrétien stepped down, Parliament passed a law that banned parties from accepting campaign contributions from corporations, as well as granting parties a subsidy based on their share of popular vote from the most recent election. While viewed positively among the public as an electoral reform after some early revelations of the sponsorship scandal, Bill C-24 was opposed by many of his own MPs who saw it as a poison pill since it effectively cut off the main source of funding for the Liberals; they had enjoyed the majority of company donations for the last decade due to a fragmented opposition. Party president Stephen LeDrew famously derided Bill C-24 as "dumb as a bag of hammers". While the opposition parties were well poised to reap the benefits of Bill C-24 due to their established grassroots fund raising, the Liberals were caught unprepared for this change. This would hamper them in the 2004 and 2006 campaigns, leaving them in heavy debt.

== Martin's Cabinet ==
In November 2003, Martin was elected as Liberal leader by capturing 3,242 of 3,455 delegates. He had won the leadership almost unopposed, due to his hold on the party machinery, and because Chrétien supporters did not rally around either of Martin's leadership opponents (with Martin's large lead, even most Chrétien supporters grudgingly voted for Martin). Potential contenders Brian Tobin and Allan Rock never formally entered the race, while John Manley dropped out and Sheila Copps received at most marginal support. Martin was sworn in as Prime Minister in December.

While the issue of the party leadership was settled, at the lower levels unprecedented intraparty warfare began. Martin replaced half of Chrétien's ministers, one of the largest cabinet turnovers in Canadian history for a ruling party undergoing a leadership change. Ministers such as John Manley, Allan Rock, Don Boudria, David Collenette, and Sheila Copps, who had played key roles during Chrétien's decade in power, were reduced to minor roles or compelled to take patronage appointments, and many of them decided to retire from politics.

Besides excluding experienced Chrétien supporters from cabinet, Martin also outraged many of them by guaranteeing his star candidates powerful cabinet posts, despite many being newcomers to federal politics.

Several Chrétien loyalists wanted to remain as backbenchers. In some cases, they were defeated in the riding nomination process, with widespread allegations of tampering by Martin supporters. Unlike in previous elections, incumbent Liberals were not automatically granted their local nomination.

== Sponsorship Scandal ==
Chrétien's supporters have suggested that Martin had used the sponsorship scandal as a pretense to remove many Chrétien supporters, such as André Ouellet, Alfonso Gagliano, and Jean Pelletier, from their positions in government, crown corporations, and the party. The Chrétien camp contends that the Gomery commission was set up to make them look bad, and that it was not a fair investigation. The scandal also cast skepticism on Martin's cabinet appointments, prompting speculation Martin was simply ridding the government of Chrétien's supporters to distance the Liberals from the scandal.

The first volume of the Gomery Report, released on November 1, 2005, cleared Martin of any wrongdoing while placing blame for the scandal on Chrétien. However, many have criticized the Gomery Inquiry as not having the scope to assign criminal responsibility for the Scandal or to investigate Martin's role, and indeed some have accused Martin of purposely "tying Gomery's hands." While the Gomery Report: Phase 1 exonerated Martin from responsibility and liability for the misspending of public funds, Chrétien has decided to take an action in Federal Court to review the commission report on the grounds that Gomery showed a "reasonable apprehension of bias", and that some conclusions didn't have an "evidentiary" basis.

The controversy over responsibility for Chrétien's legal fees also proved another potentially divisive issue. Many of Martin's ministers wanted to deny Chrétien and his supporters further federal aid, as it would be criticized by opposition parties and the public alike, though such a position would anger many Chrétien loyalists.

Outgoing minister Reg Alcock did approve a payment of up to $40,000 to assist Jean Pelletier with legal fees in a court challenge against the Gomery Commission after the Liberals were defeated in the 2006 federal election. Representatives of other parties criticized this payment, though Pelletier's lawyer argued that it followed a long-standing government policy for high-ranking functionaries in judicial proceedings.

== Public ==
Formally, Chrétien and Martin have remained publicly respectful of each other; while much of the verbal sparring was between their supporters. After being dismissed or resigning from cabinet, Martin did not comment on the government, as he was focused upon leadership campaigning. At the November 2003 Liberal leadership convention, Chrétien pledged that he would help Martin to win the Liberals' fourth consecutive majority government, while Martin said that many of his initiatives as Finance Minister were credited to Chrétien's support.

At the 2006 leadership convention in Montreal, Martin's final speech as outgoing leader paid tribute to Chrétien, but the latter was not present for the event.

== Nomination battles ==
In Canadian federal politics, would-be electoral candidates will generally seek the nomination of their chosen party within the local constituency. The nominee is chosen by members of the party within the constituency, and consequently the candidates attempt to sign up as many new members as possible to support them prior to the nomination meeting. In previous elections, incumbent Liberal Members of Parliament (MPs) were protected from nomination challenges; this rule was not applied in 2004, especially towards Chrétien supporters. Martin claimed that he wanted to make the process more democratic, but he was heavily criticized when he overruled the new process to parachute in his handpicked star candidates, often against the wishes of the local riding association.

The highest profile battle was in the riding of Hamilton East—Stoney Creek between former Deputy Prime Minister and leadership candidate Sheila Copps and Martin loyalist and newly appointed Minister of Transport Tony Valeri. Copps had been one of the most noted representatives of the party's left wing for over two decades, dating to the party's nadir in the mid-1980s. However, Elections Canada had merged her riding with Valeri's in a way that slightly favoured Valeri. Copps lost the nomination battle, which she blamed on dirty tricks.

In several ridings, the nomination battles resulted in the splitting of the Liberal vote, as disgruntled party members supported the Conservatives, NDP or Bloc, costing the Liberals several otherwise safe seats.

Other battles happened across the country:

- Charles Caccia, the longest serving MP, was forced out by Martin loyalist Mario Silva; Caccia initially planned to run as an independent candidate against Silva, but bowed out of the race before the election because his candidacy may have split the Liberal vote.
- In the merged riding of Mississauga—Erindale, Chrétien loyalist Steve Mahoney lost to supposed Martinite Carolyn Parrish. Parrish, contrary to what many believed was not a staunch Martin supporter; Mahoney had initially supported Martin but later opposed the backroom campaigning. He was rewarded with a junior cabinet post near the end of Chrétien's tenure, severing his relations with the Martin camp who then rallied to Parrish's cause. Parrish's anti-US comments endured her to Muslims in her riding, while the Jewish community supported Mahoney. Parrish was later kicked out of the Liberal caucus for further anti-US remarks and she did not seek re-election in 2006.
- In Ottawa Centre, Penny Collenette chose to not run for the Liberal Party nomination. Martin advisor Richard Mahoney won the nomination and went on to lose to former NDP leader Ed Broadbent.
- Ottawa South opponents of David McGuinty, brother of Ontario premier Dalton McGuinty, were allegedly given only three days to recruit voters. This proved less controversial since outgoing MP John Manley was a close friend of Premier McGuinty.
- Incumbent Eugène Bellemare lost the Ottawa—Orléans nomination to Marc Godbout. Godbout won the general election but was defeated in his 2006 reelection bid.
- Incumbent Ivan Grose lost the Oshawa nomination to Louise Parkes. Parkes finished third, behind eventual winner Conservative Colin Carrie and the NDP's Sid Ryan
- In the merged riding of Welland, Tony Tirabassi was defeated by John Maloney.
- In Burnaby—Douglas, Martin supporter Bill Cunningham, a former president of the Liberal Party of Canada (British Columbia), was directly appointed by the party leader without allowing a vote; the entire riding association executive resigned in protest. Cunningham was defeated by NDP's Bill Siksay.
- Steven Hogue, a Chrétien supporter, was disallowed from running in Chrétien's former riding of Saint-Maurice—Champlain purportedly because Martin wanted women to be nominated in winnable ridings in Quebec. Martin's Quebec lieutenant Jean Lapierre described Hogue as not being a "loyal Liberal". The eventual nominee, Marie-Eve Bilodeau, received support from Chrétien, in one of his few campaign appearances, but Bilodeau was defeated by the Bloc.
- Lisette Lepage was forced to run in a stronghold of the Bloc Québécois, Charlevoix—Montmorency, because she (as well as two other women) were denied the chance to run in the safe Liberal riding of Beauport as it was reserved for Martin loyalist and former MP Dennis Dawson. Dawson was defeated by a two to one margin.
- Robert Bertrand who lost to David Smith in the Pontiac riding.
- After Martin appointed Ruby Dhalla over local candidates in Brampton—Springdale, the Liberal riding association decided to back New Democratic Party candidate Kathy Pounder.
- In Charleswood—St. James—Assiniboia, Martin star-candidate and former Winnipeg mayor Glen Murray was defeated by Conservative Steven Fletcher following the resignation of the popular Liberal MP John Harvard. Harvard was persuaded to step aside and was appointed lieutenant-governor of Manitoba.
