= 2003 Liberal Party of Canada leadership election =

Party election in Canada

- November 14, 2003
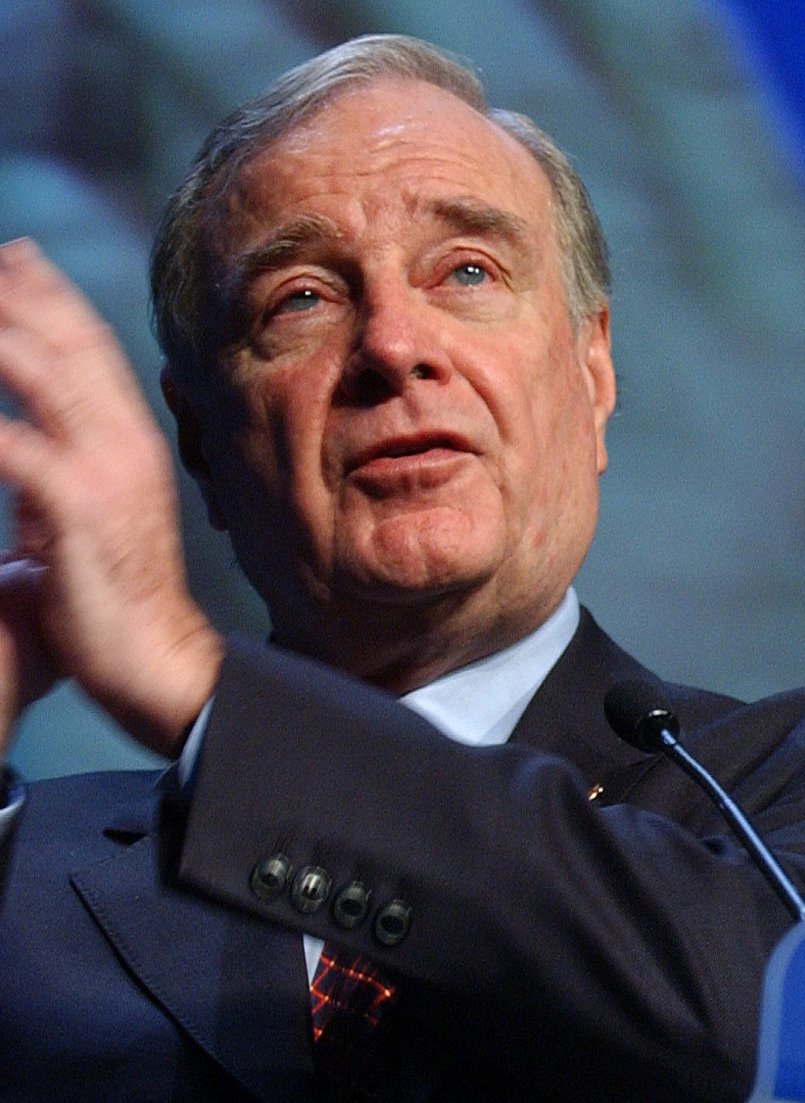

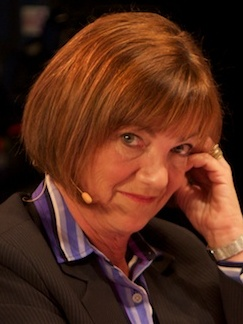
Candidate	Paul Martin	Sheila Copps
Delegate count	3,242	211
Percentage	93.8%	6.1%
Leader before election
Jean Chrétien
Elected Leader
Paul Martin

2003 Liberal leadership election
- Date: November 14, 2003
- Convention: Air Canada Centre, Toronto, Ontario
- Resigning leader: Jean Chrétien
- Won by: Paul Martin
- Ballots: 1
- Candidates: 2
- Entrance fee: $75,000
- Spending limit: $4 million

The Liberal Party of Canada held a leadership election on November 14, 2003, electing former finance minister Paul Martin as the party's new leader, replacing outgoing leader (and prime minister) Jean Chrétien.

Stakes for the race were high as the winner would go on to become prime minister, in addition to leading a party that was high in the polls without a significant challenger.

Paul Martin spent the entire race as the front runner, as his supporters had secured a lock on the party executives of the federal and most provincial sections of the party. Because of Martin's apparent strength, several prominent candidates, such as Allan Rock, and Brian Tobin, did not go beyond the formative stages.

Martin's only serious challengers were John Manley, who withdrew before delegate selection began, and Sheila Copps. Martin easily captured the leadership with 93.8% of the delegates.

The party would be beset by significant infighting afterwards, as he and his supporters moved to remove Chrétien supporters from cabinet and even from Parliament. Martin's initial tactics to secure the leadership were generally seen, in retrospect, as weakening his eventual tenure as prime minister.

== Timeline ==
=== 2002 ===
- June 2 – Paul Martin resigns as Finance Minister of Canada. John Manley is named to replace him.
- August 21 – Prime Minister Jean Chrétien tells Canadians he will step down in February 2004.

=== 2003 ===
- February 13 – Sheila Copps announces she is going to run for leadership.
- March 7 – Martin announces he is going to run for leadership.
- March 17 – Manley announces he is going to run for leadership.
- July 22 – Manley drops out of the race.
- September 21 – Martin's victory becomes a certainty when he secures 92% of the party delegates from across the country.
- November 14 – Martin officially becomes leader of the Liberal Party of Canada winning 3,242 of 3,455 votes against Copps.
- November 28 – Manley announces his retirement from politics.
- December 12 – Martin is sworn in as Canada's prime minister, along with his cabinet.

== Candidates ==
=== Sheila Copps ===
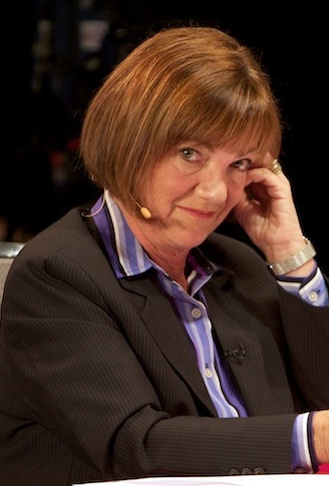
Sheila Copps

Background

Sheila Copps, 50, had been MP for Hamilton East, Ontario, since 1984. At the time of the leadership election, she was Minister of Canadian Heritage, since 1996. Previously, Copps had been Deputy Prime Minister (1993–1996, 1996–1997), Minister of the Environment (1993–1996), Minister of the Multiculturalism and Citizenship (1996), Minister of the Communications (1996), and Minister of Amateur Sport (1996–1999). Copps was a candidate during the 1990 leadership election, finishing in third.

Date campaign launched: February 13, 2003

Endorsements of Sheila Copps
- MPs: (6) Bonnie Brown (Oakville), Sarmite Bulte (Parkdale—High Park), Charles Caccia (Davenport), John Baird Finlay (Oxford), Clifford Lincoln (Lac-Saint-Louis), Beth Phinney (Hamilton Mountain)
- Senators: (15) Willie Adams, Tommy Banks, Michel Biron, Sharon Carstairs, (Note: Previously supported John Manley.) Thelma Chalifoux, Maria Chaput, Pierre de Bané, Laurier LaPierre, Raymond Lavigne, Rose-Marie Losier-Cool, Pana Merchant, Lorna Milne, Vivienne Poy, Fernand Robichaud, Raymond Setlakwe

=== Paul Martin ===
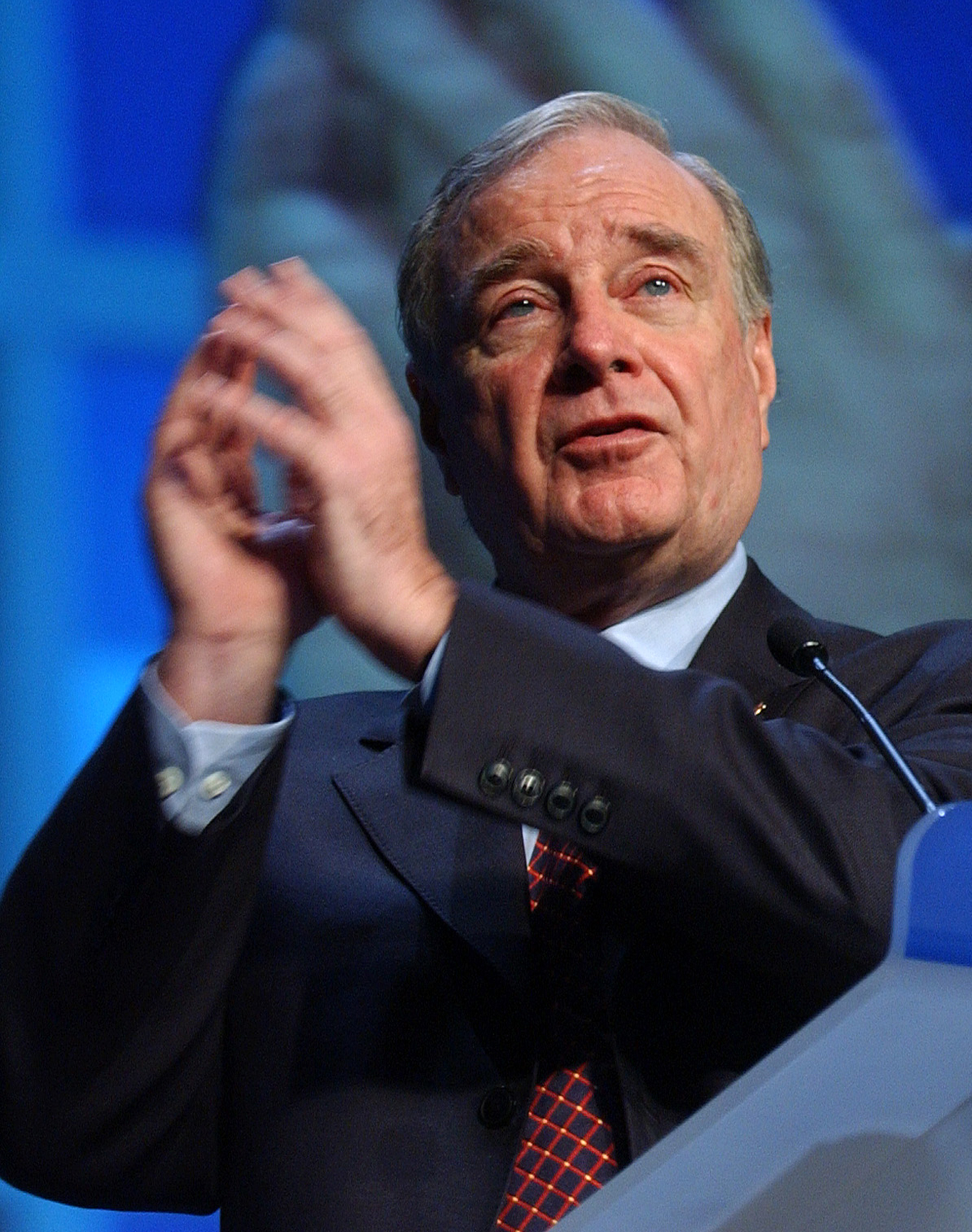
Paul Martin

Background

Paul Martin, 65, had been MP for LaSalle—Émard, Quebec since 1988. From 1993 to 2002, he was Minister of Finance. Martin had previously stood for the leadership in the 1990 leadership election, finishing second. The combination of his leadership ambitions and Jean Chrétien's slim win during the 1997 election led to a period of infighting within the party, resulting in Martin leaving cabinet in June 2002, and Chrétien, in the face of a leadership review, announcing his intention to step down February 2004.

Date campaign launched: March 7, 2003

Endorsements of Paul Martin
- MPs: (137) Reg Alcock (Winnipeg South), David Anderson (Victoria), Mark Assad (Gatineau), Sarkis Assadourian (Brampton Centre), Jean Augustine (Etobicoke—Lakeshore), Larry Bagnell (Yukon), Sue Barnes (London West), Gilbert Barrette (Témiscamingue), Réginald Bélair (Timmins-James Bay), Mauril Bélanger (Ottawa—Vanier), Eugène Bellemare (Ottawa—Orléans), Carolyn Bennett (St. Paul's), Maurizio Bevilacqua (Vaughan—King—Aurora), Robert Bertrand (Pontiac—Gatineau—Labelle), Gérard Binet (Frontenac—Mégantic), Ethel Blondin-Andrew (Western Arctic), Raymond Bonin (Nickel Belt), Paul Bonwick (Simcoe—Grey), Claudette Bradshaw (Moncton—Riverview—Dieppe), Gerry Byrne (Humber—St. Barbe—Baie Verte), John Cannis (Scarborough Centre), Murray Calder (Dufferin—Peel—Wellington—Grey), Elinor Caplan (Thornhill), Aileen Carroll (Barrie—Simcoe—Bradford), Jeannot Castonguay (Madawaska—Restigouche), Brenda Chamberlain (Guelph—Wellington), Yvon Charbonneau (Anjou—Rivière-des-Prairies), Denis Coderre (Bourassa), David Collenette (Don Valley East), Joe Comuzzi (Thunder Bay—Superior North), Irwin Cotler (Mount Royal), Roy Cullen (Etobicoke North), Rodger Cuzner (Bras d'Or—Cape Breton), Paul DeVillers (Simcoe North), Stéphane Dion (Saint-Laurent—Cartierville), Nick Discepola (Vaudreuil-Soulanges), Stan Dromisky (Thunder Bay—Atikokan), Claude Duplain (Portneuf), Wayne Easter (Malpeque), Art Eggleton (York Centre), John Efford (Bonavista—Trinity—Conception), Mark Eyking (Sydney—Victoria), Georges Farrah (Bonaventure—Gaspé—Îles-de-la-Madeleine—Pabok), Raymonde Folco (Laval West), Joe Fontana (London North Centre), Liza Frulla (Verdun—Saint-Henri—Saint-Paul—Pointe Saint-Charles), Hedy Fry (Vancouver Centre), Roger Gallaway (Sarnia—Lambton), John Godfrey (Don Valley West), Ralph Goodale (Wascana), Bill Graham (Toronto Centre—Rosedale), Ivan Grose (Oshawa), Albina Guarnieri (Mississauga East), John Harvard (Charleswood—St. James—Assiniboia), André Harvey (Chicoutimi—Le Fjord), Tony Ianno (Trinity—Spadina), Ovid Jackson (Bruce—Grey—Owen Sound), Marlene Jennings (Notre-Dame-de-Grâce—Lachine), Christian Jobin (Lévis-et-Chutes-de-la-Chaudière), Joe Jordan (Leeds—Grenville), Jim Karygiannis (Scarborough—Agincourt), Stan Keyes (Hamilton West), David Kilgour (Edmonton Southeast), Gar Knutson (Elgin—Middlesex—London), Karen Kraft Sloan (York North), Walt Lastewka (St. Catharines), Derek Lee (Scarborough—Rouge River), Sophia Leung (Vancouver Kingsway), Judi Longfield (Whitby—Ajax), Paul Macklin (Northumberland), Steve Mahoney (Mississauga West), Gurbax Singh Malhi (Bramalea—Gore—Malton—Springdale), John David Maloney (Erie—Lincoln), Serge Marcil (Beauharnois—Salaberry), Diane Marleau (Sudbury), Bill Matthews (Burin—St. George's), John McCallum (Markham), Larry McCormick (Hastings—Frontenac—Lennox and Addington), Joe McGuire (Egmont), John McKay (Scarborough East), Anne McLellan (Edmonton West), Dan McTeague (Pickering—Ajax—Uxbridge), Dennis Mills (Toronto—Danforth), Maria Minna (Beaches—East York), Andy Mitchell (Parry Sound-Muskoka), Shawn Murphy (Hillsborough), Lynn Myers (Waterloo—Wellington), Bob Nault (Kenora—Rainy River), Anita Neville (Winnipeg South Centre), Gilbert Normand (Bellechasse—Etchemins—Montmagny—L'Islet), Pat O'Brien (London—Fanshawe), Lawrence D. O'Brien (Labrador), John O'Reilly (Haliburton—Victoria—Brock), Stephen Owen (Vancouver Quadra), Massimo Pacetti (Saint-Léonard—Saint-Michel), Rey Pagtakhan (Winnipeg North—St. Paul), Denis Paradis (Brome—Missisquoi), Carolyn Parrish (Mississauga Centre), Bernard Patry (Pierrefonds—Dollard), Janko Peric (Cambridge), Joe Peschisolido (Richmond), Jim Peterson (Willowdale), Pierre Pettigrew (Papineau—Saint-Denis), Jerry Pickard (Chatham-Kent—Essex), Gary Pillitteri (Niagara Falls), David Pratt (Nepean—Carleton), David Price (Compton—Stanstead), Carmen Provenzano (Sault Ste. Marie), Karen Redman (Kitchener Centre), Julian Reed (Halton), Geoff Regan (Halifax West), Lucienne Robillard (Westmount—Ville-Marie), Allan Rock (Etobicoke Centre), Jacques Saada (Brossard—La Prairie), Andy Savoy (Tobique—Mactaquac), Judy Sgro (York West), Hélène Scherrer (Louis-Hébert), Andy Scott (Fredericton), Benoît Serré (Timiskaming—Cochrane), Alex Shepherd (Durham), Raymond Simard (Saint Boniface), Bob Speller (Haldimand—Norfolk), Diane St-Jacques (Shefford), Brent St. Denis (Algoma—Manitoulin), Paul Steckle (Huron—Bruce), Jane Stewart (Brant), Andrew Telegdi (Kitchener—Waterloo), Robert Thibault (West Nova), Yolande Thibeault (Saint-Lambert), Tony Tirabassi (Niagara Centre), Alan Tonks (York South—Weston), Rose-Marie Ur (Lambton—Kent—Middlesex), Tony Valeri (Stoney Creek), Lyle Vanclief (Prince Edward—Hastings), Joe Volpe (Eglinton—Lawrence), Tom Wappel (Scarborough Southwest), Bryon Wilfert (Oak Ridges)
- Senators: (32) Jack Austin, Lise Bacon, George Baker, John G. Bryden, Catherine Callbeck, Joan Cook, Anne Cools, Eymard Corbin, Joyce Fairbairn, Marisa Ferretti Barth, Isobel Finnerty, George Furey, Jean-Robert Gauthier, Aurélien Gill, Jerry Grafstein, Alasdair Graham, Dan Hays, Colin Kenny, Leo Kolber, Richard Kroft, Jean Lapointe, Shirley Maheu, Frank Mahovlich, Landon Pearson, Lucie Pépin, Gerard Phalen, Pierrette Ringuette, Bill Rompkey, Nick Sibbeston, Herbert O. Sparrow, Peter Stollery, Charlie Watt

== Withdrawn candidates ==
=== John Manley ===
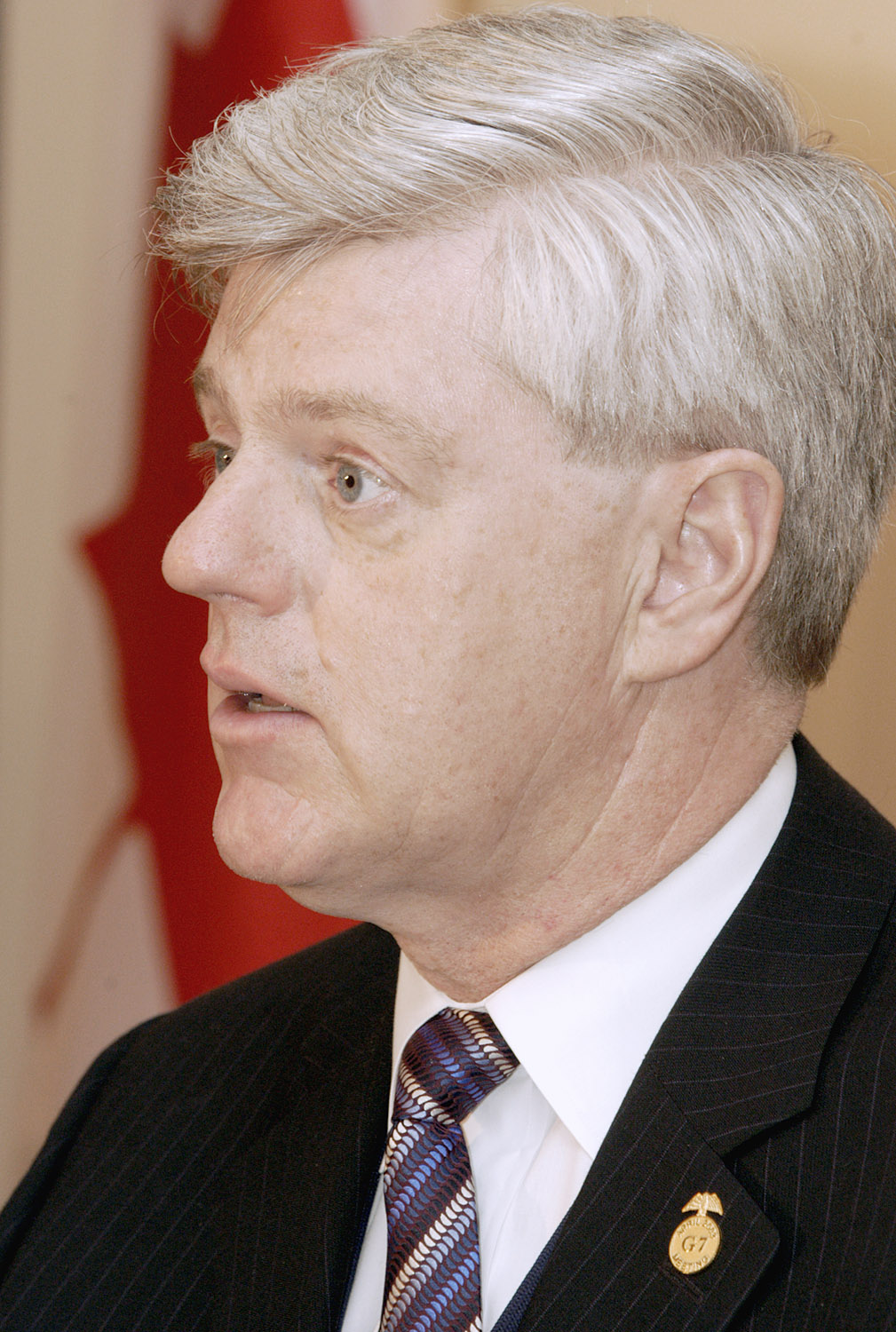
John Manley

Background

John Manley, 53, had been MP for Ottawa South, Ontario since 1988. At the time of his candidacy, he was the incumbent Deputy Prime Minister and Minister of Finance, both since 2002. Previously, Manley had been Minister of Industry, Science and Technology (1993–1995), Minister of Consumer and Corporate Affairs (1993–1995), Minister of Industry (1995–2000) and Minister of Foreign Affairs (2000–2002).
Manley withdrew from the race on July 22, 2003 and endorsed Martin.

Date campaign launched: March 17, 2003
Date campaign ended: July 22, 2003

Endorsements

Endorsements of John Manley
- MPs: (10) Peter Adams (Peterborough), Colleen Beaumier (Brampton West—Mississauga), Martin Cauchon (Outremont), Dominic LeBlanc (Beauséjour—Petitcodiac), Bob Nault (Kenora—Rainy River), Lawrence MacAulay (Cardigan), Alex Shepherd (Durham), Jane Stewart (Brant), Susan Whelan (Essex), Bob Wood (Nipissing)
- Senators: (4) Sharon Carstairs, Michael J. L. Kirby, Yves Morin, Marie Charette-Poulin

== Declined to run ==
- Don Boudria, MP for Glengarry—Prescott—Russell and Leader of the Government in the House of Commons
- Martin Cauchon, MP for Outremont and Minister of Justice and Attorney General
- Herb Dhaliwal, MP for Vancouver South—Burnaby and Minister of Natural Resources
- Frank McKenna, former Premier of New Brunswick
- Anne McLellan, MP for Edmonton Centre and Minister of Health
- Dennis Mills, MP for Toronto—Danforth
- Maria Minna, MP for Beaches—East York
- Pierre Pettigrew, MP for Papineau—Saint-Denis and Minister for International Trade
- Allan Rock, MP for Etobicoke Centre and Minister of Industry
- Brian Tobin, former Premier of Newfoundland

== Results ==
First Ballot
Candidate	Delegate Support	Percentage
Paul Martin	3,242	93.8%
Sheila Copps	211	6.1%
Spoiled ballots	2	0.1%
Total	3,455	100%

First ballot
Martin	93.84%
Copps	6.11%
Spoilt ballots	0.06%
