= Darlington Creek =

Darlington Creek ruisseau Darlington
- Location of the mouth of Darlington Creek in southern Ontario
- Etymology: named for Darlington Township

Location
- Country: Canada
- Province: Ontario
- Regional Municipality: Durham
- Municipality: Clarington

Physical characteristics
- Source: Unnamed field
  - coordinates: 43°55′05″N 78°44′54″W
  - elevation: 145
- Mouth: Lake Ontario
  - coordinates: 43°52′36″N 78°41′29″W
  - elevation: 74.1 m (243 ft)

Basin features
- Progression: Lake Ontario→ Saint Lawrence River→ Gulf of Saint Lawrence
- River system: Lake Ontario drainage basin

Darlington Creek (French: ruisseau Darlington) is a stream in the municipality of Clarington, Regional Municipality of Durham in Ontario, Canada. It is a tributary of Lake Ontario and is located in geographic Darlington Township, after which it is named.

== Course ==
Darlington Creek begins at an unnamed field at the west edge of the local Rundle Road at an elevation of 145 metres (476 ft) and heads southwest, under Durham Highway 2, then south, parallel to Ontario Highway 418. It heads southeast, passes under the Canadian Pacific Railway main line, Ontario Highway 401, and the Canadian National Railway main lines, then turns south, and reaches its mouth at Lake Ontario. Lake Ontario flows via the Saint Lawrence River to the Gulf of Saint Lawrence.

== Watershed ==
Groundwater discharge from the bluffs left from glacial Lake Iroquois feed the headwaters of Darlington Creek.

The watersheds of four other watercourses border the creek. The longest, Bowmanville Creek, to the east, has its headwaters in the Oak Ridges Moraine. The other three watersheds are Tooley Creek, Farewell Creek, and Westside Creek.
