= Bowmanville Creek =

Bowmanville Creek ruisseau Bowmanville
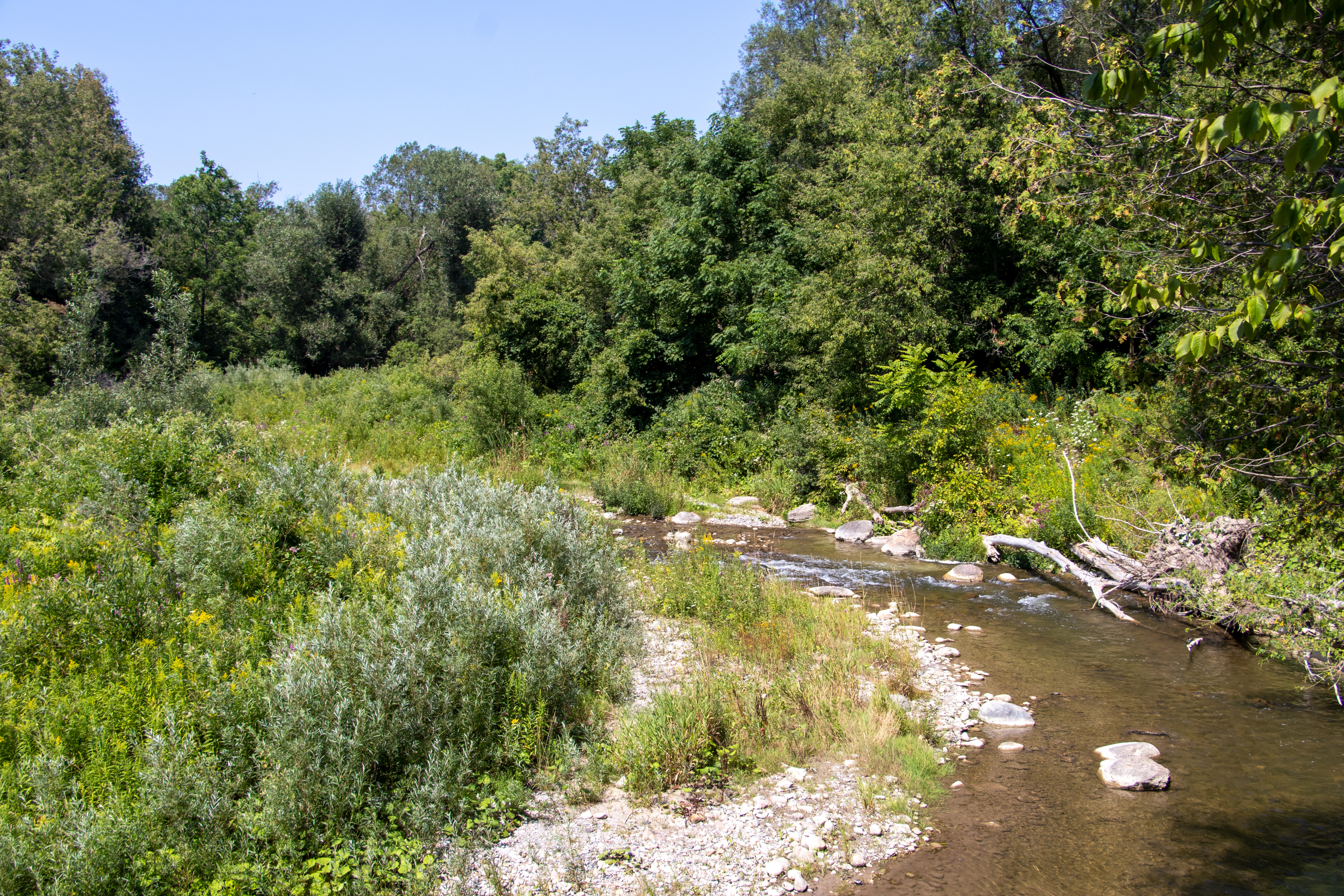
- Creek in Bowmanville, 2023.

- Location of the mouth of Bowmanville Creek in Southern Ontario

Location
- Country: Canada
- Province: Ontario
- Regional Municipality: Durham
- Municipality: Clarington

Physical characteristics
- Source: Confluence of three unnamed streams
  - location: Enfield
  - coordinates: 44°01′25″N 78°49′50″W
  - elevation: 255
- Mouth: Lake Ontario
  - location: Bowmanville
  - coordinates: 43°53′16″N 78°39′51″W
  - elevation: 74.1 m (243 ft)
- Basin size: 170 km^{2} (66 sq mi)

Basin features
- Progression: Lake Ontario→ Saint Lawrence River→ Gulf of Saint Lawrence
- River system: Lake Ontario drainage basin
- Tributaries
  - left: Soper Creek

Bowmanville Creek (French: ruisseau Bowmanville) is a stream in the municipality of Clarington, Regional Municipality of Durham in south-central Ontario, Canada. It flows from the Oak Ridges Moraine to Lake Ontario at Bowmanville. The creek is under the auspices of the Central Lake Ontario Conservation Authority.

== Drainage basin ==
The headwaters of Bowmanville Creek border the headwaters of Oshawa Creek (to the west) and those of its left tributary Soper Creek (to the east), the headwaters of all of which are in the Oak Ridges Moraine. Between the mouths at Lake Ontario of Oshawa Creek (to the west) and Bowmanville Creek there are five smaller creeks (from west to east): Farewell Creek, Robinson Creek, Tooley Creek, Darlington Creek and Westside Creek. The next named watercourse to the east is Wilmot Creek.

The area of the drainage basin of Bowmanville Creek is about 170 square kilometres (66 sq mi); almost all of the drainage basin is within Clarington, with the exception of a small part of the headwaters which are in the township municipality of Scugog to the north.

== Course ==
Bowmanville Creek begins at the confluence of three unnamed streams near the settlement of Enfield at an elevation of 255 metres (837 ft). It flows southeast then turns south near the settlement of Enniskillen, flows under Ontario Highway 407 and reaches the settlement of Hampton. It continues south into the community of Bowmanville, flows under Ontario Highway 401, takes in the left tributary Soper Creek, and reaches its mouth at Port Darlington on Lake Ontario at an elevation of 74.1 metres (243 ft).

== Natural history ==
Bowmanville Creek has been dammed in several places. About one kilometre north of Lake Ontario is the former Goodyear dam, originally built to provide electricity for a factory. This dam was a barrier to fish migration, and until the construction of a fish ladder trout and salmon were lifted over the dam by volunteers and conservation workers. A little further north, in what is now downtown Bowmanville, a dam provided water power for the Vanstone Mill until it was washed out in a storm in 1986.

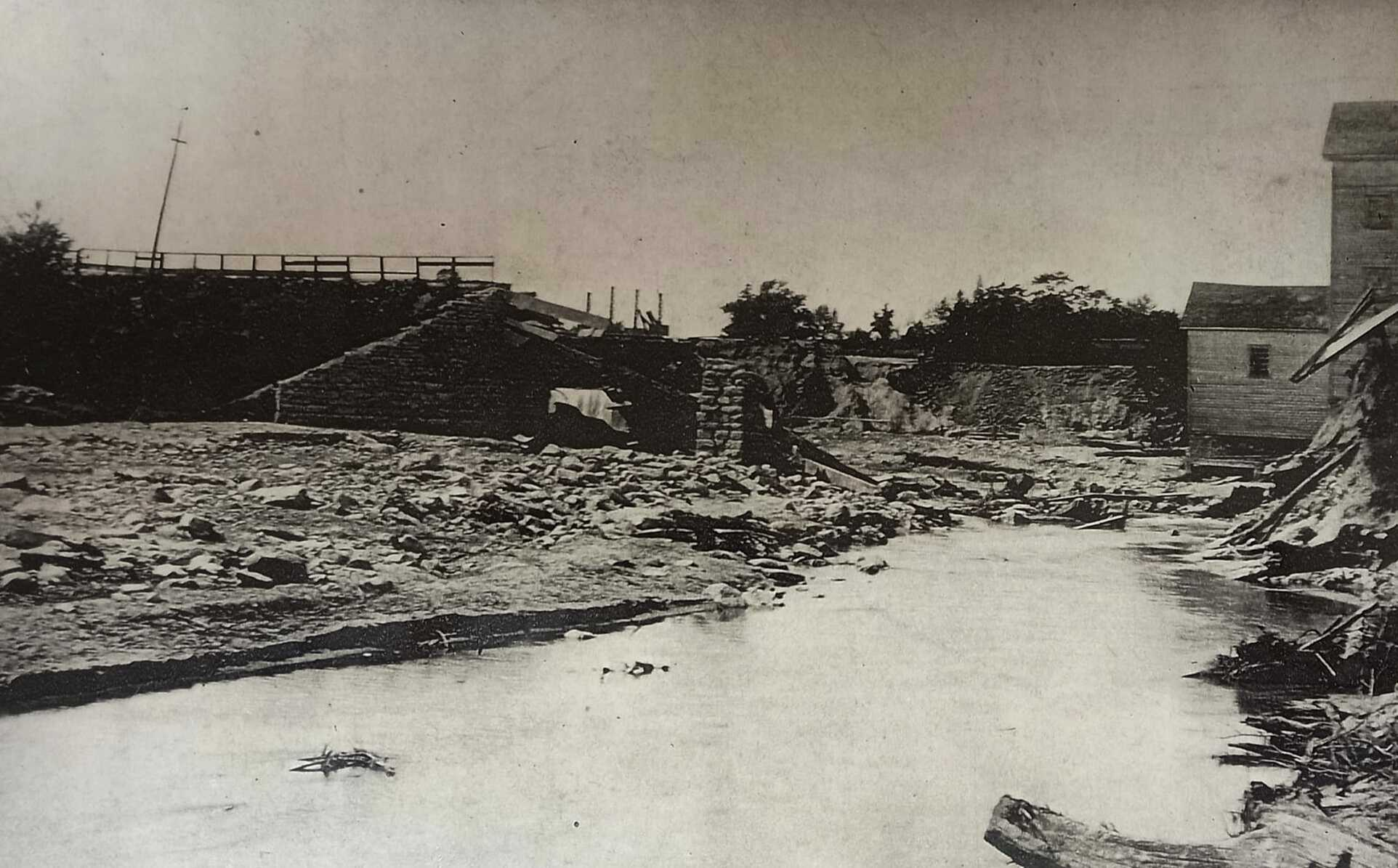
An early dam that was washed out at the Vanstone Mill circa 1890

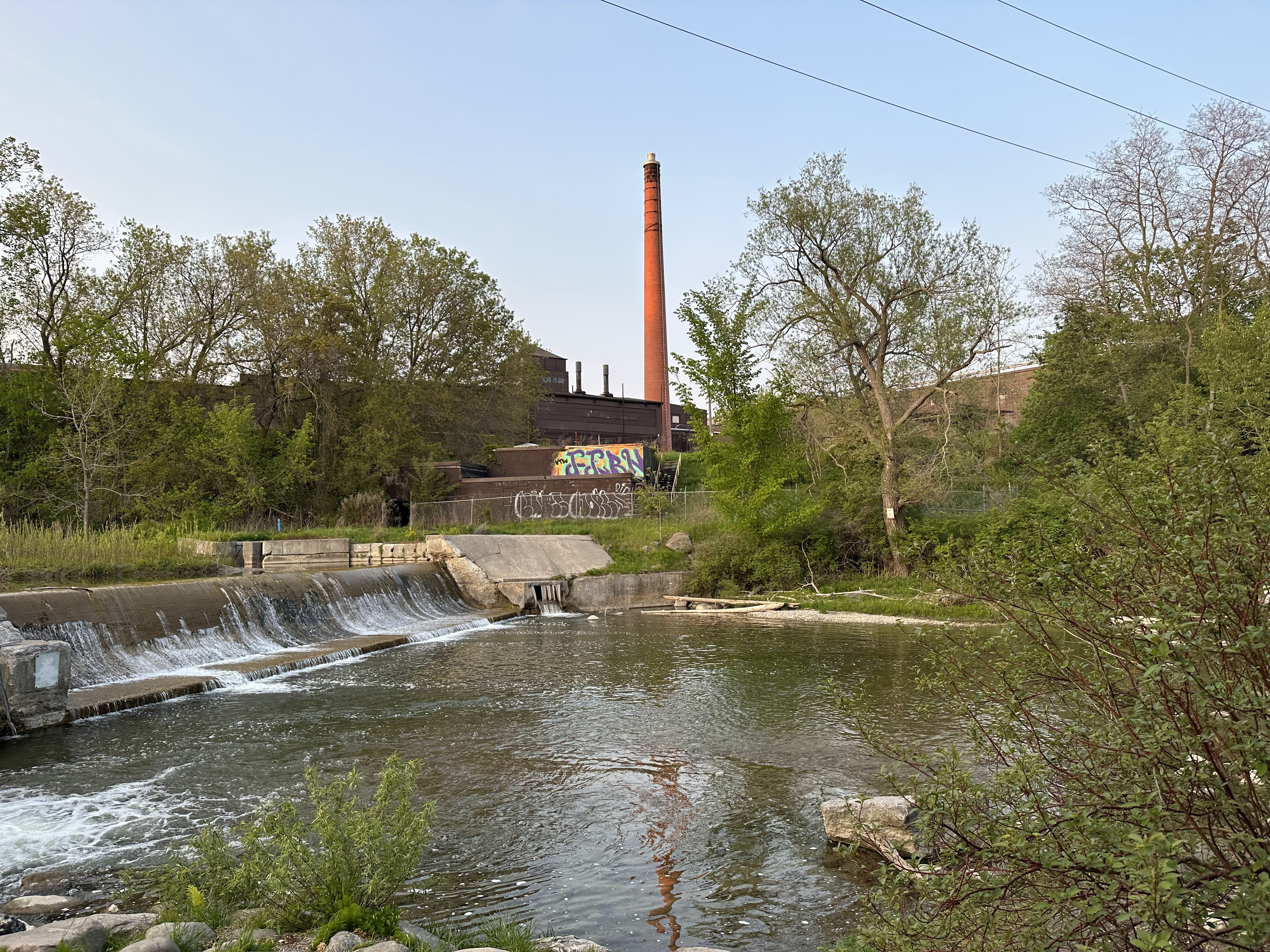
Site of another dam, now Salmon ladder at former Goodyear Factory
