= Corbett Creek =

Coordinates: 43°51′12″N 78°53′06″W

Corbett Creek is a small watercourse that drains into Lake Ontario in Whitby, Ontario. It drains 1,455 hectares (5.62 sq mi).

To the west it borders on the watershed of Pringle Creek. To the east it borders on the watershed of Oshawa Creek.
