= Christine Anderson =

German politician (born 1968)

Christine Anderson MEP
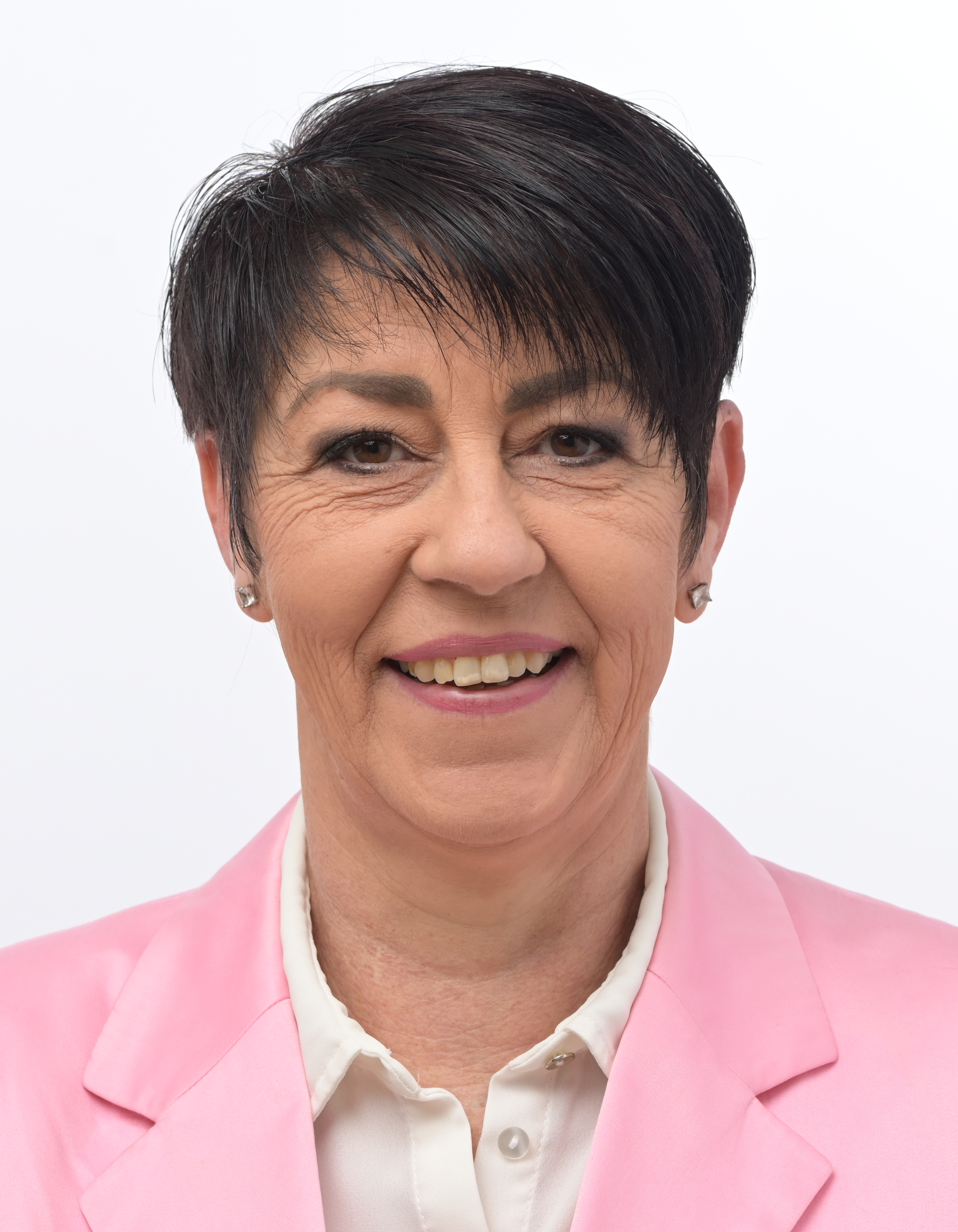
- Official portrait, 2024

Member of the European Parliament for Germany
- Incumbent
- Assumed office 2 July 2019

Personal details
- Born: 29 July 1968 (age 58) Eschwege, West Germany
- Party: Alternative for Germany (since 2013)

Christine Margarete Anderson (born 29 July 1968) is a German politician who has been serving as a Member of the European Parliament since 2019. A member of the Alternative for Germany (AfD), Anderson is a former activist of the Pegida movement.

== Background and education ==
Anderson was born in Eschwege, Hesse, West Germany. She completed a commercial apprenticeship. She lived in the United States for six years, where she studied economics and worked for a US trading company. Her brother, Ralph Moller, has claimed that Anderson did not complete her studies and that the reported trading company job was actually a sales associate job at an outerwear store.

== Political career ==
In 2013 Anderson became a member of Alternative for Germany (AfD). From 2016 to 2018, she was the party's group leader in the Limburg-Weilburg district assembly. She was elected to the European Parliament in the 2019 election. Before the election, she stated her goal was to "lead Germany out of this EU nightmare".

Anderson is a former activist of the anti-Islam, far-right Pegida movement, having participated in Pegida street protests promoting opposition to immigration, specifically Islamic migrants. She has also appeared on Rebel News, where she stated her support for the Canada convoy protest having supported Canadian anti-mandate protesters since 2021.

In the European Parliament, Anderson is a member of the Committee on Culture and Education, the Committee on Women's Rights and Gender Equality, and the Special Committee on Artificial Intelligence in the Digital Age, and a deputy member of the Committee on the Internal Market and Consumer Protection.

Anderson was appointed to the Special Committee on the COVID-19 Pandemic, and in a July 2022 session she entered into the record a complaint that there had been too much emphasis upon getting experimental gene therapy treatments into healthy people.

In February 2023, Anderson was pictured alongside three Canadian MPs, Colin Carrie, Leslyn Lewis and Dean Allison, all of whom are members of the Conservative Party. The picture sparked a political controversy in Canada, with several groups, including the Centre for Israel and Jewish Affairs, criticizing the meeting. Conservative leader Pierre Poilievre denounced the meeting, stating: "Frankly, it would be better if Anderson never visited Canada in the first place. She and her racist, hateful views are not welcome here."

== Personal life ==
Anderson has three children and lives in Fulda.
