= Rhonda Kirkland =

Canadian politician

Rhonda Kirkland MP
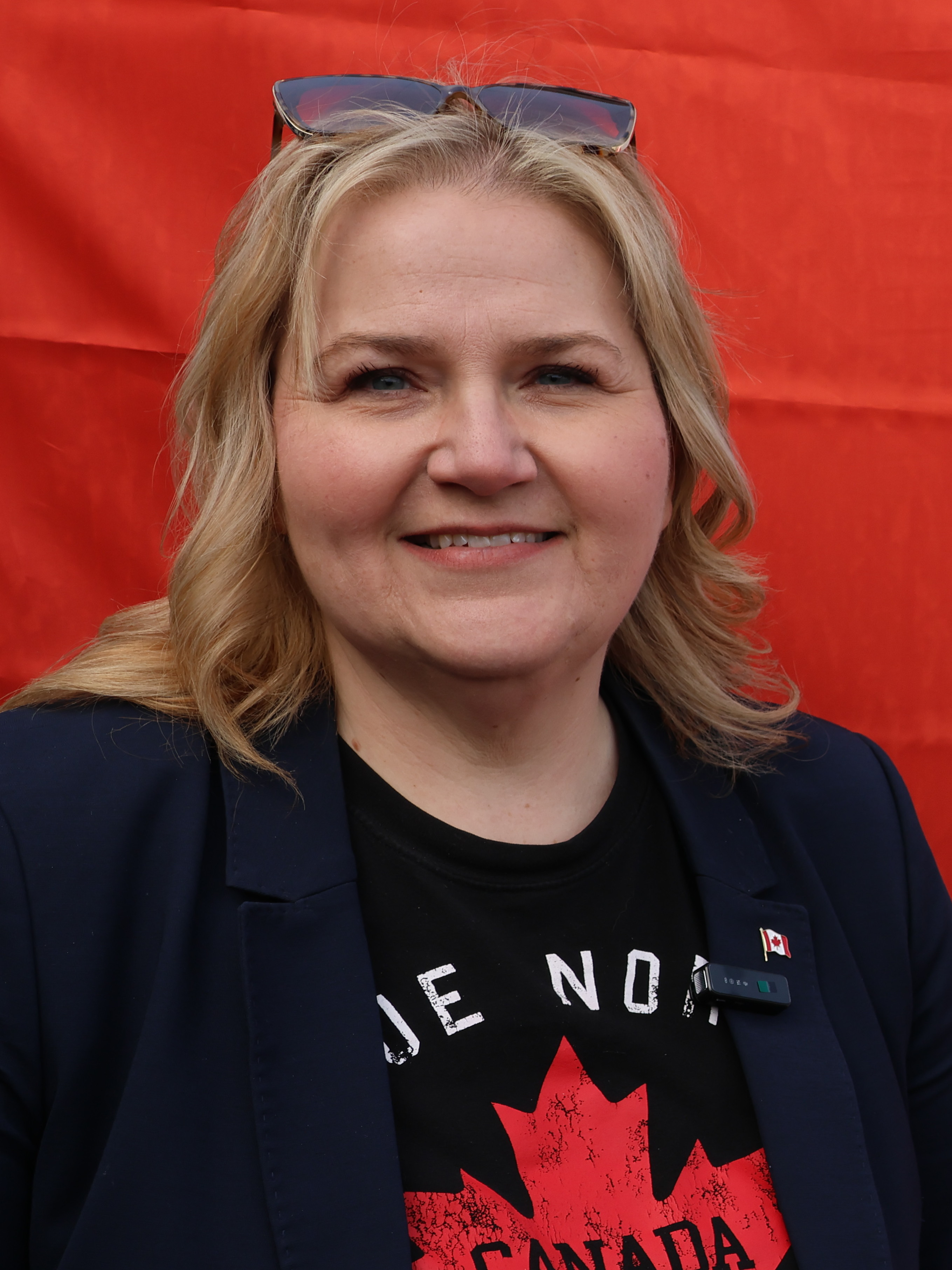
- Kirkland in 2025

Member of Parliament for Oshawa
- Incumbent
- Assumed office April 28, 2025
- Preceded by: Colin Carrie

Personal details
- Party: Conservative
- Website: www.rhondakirkland.ca

Rhonda Kirkland MP is a Canadian politician. She was elected Member of Parliament for Oshawa in the 2025 Canadian federal election. She is a certified educational therapist.

Rhonda Kirkland is a Canadian politician who serves as the Member of Parliament (MP) for Oshawa. She was elected to the House of Commons in the 45th Canadian federal election held on April 28, 2025. Kirkland is the first woman elected as MP for Oshawa. She is a member of the House of Commons Standing Committee on Public Safety and National Security.

== Early life and education ==
Kirkland was born and raised in Oshawa, Ontario. She holds a bachelor’s degree and an advanced certification from the National Institute for Learning Development.

Professional career

Kirkland is a certified educational therapist with over 20 years of experience. She has worked with children and adults with learning disabilities, including autism spectrum disorder (ASD) and dyslexia. Her work has focused on individualized cognitive and learning strategies. She has also worked as a conference speaker and trainer, particularly on early intervention.

== Political career ==
Prior to her election to Parliament, Kirkland was involved in political advocacy for over three decades. Her roles included campaign manager, volunteer coordinator, trainer, and communications support at the municipal, provincial, and federal levels.

Kirkland was elected as MP for Oshawa in 2025. In Parliament, she serves on the Standing Committee on Public Safety and National Security. Her work on the committee has included contributions to studies related to border enforcement, correctional system policies, and workplace conditions within the Canada Border Services Agency (CBSA). Her engagement on CBSA-related issues has been informed in part by concerns brought forward by Oshawa resident.

Her work on public safety and justice issues has also addressed broader concerns related to the correctional system, including parole processes, community safety, and victims’ rights. She has engaged with issues informed by cases involving Oshawa residents whose experiences highlighted concerns about parole eligibility and victim notification .

Kirkland is co-chair of the Conservative Auto Caucus and has advocated for automotive workers in Oshawa and across Canada.

== Community involvement ==
Kirkland has been active in community and charitable initiatives in Oshawa and the Durham Region. She is a Past President of the Rotary Club of Oshawa and has participated in several grassroots initiatives. As an MP, she has hosted town halls, community meetings, and public awareness events, including initiatives focused on fraud prevention.

== Electoral record ==
2025 Canadian federal election: Oshawa
Party	Candidate	Votes	%	±%	Expenditures
Conservative	Rhonda Kirkland	32,131	48.17	+8.46	$101,233.56
Liberal	Isaac Ransom	28,653	42.96	+19.84	$31,872.71
New Democratic	Sara Labelle	5,112	7.66	–20.83	$25,704.89
Green	Katherine Mathewson	804	1.21	–0.33	$0.00
Total valid votes/expense limit		66,700	99.22	–0.04	$149,213.09
Total rejected ballots		522	0.78	+0.04	
Turnout		67,222	64.12	+7.83	
Eligible voters		104,837			
Conservative hold		Swing		–5.69	
Source: Elections Canada
