= Tooley Creek =

Watercourse in Ontario, Canada

Coordinates: 43°52′07″N 78°45′39″W

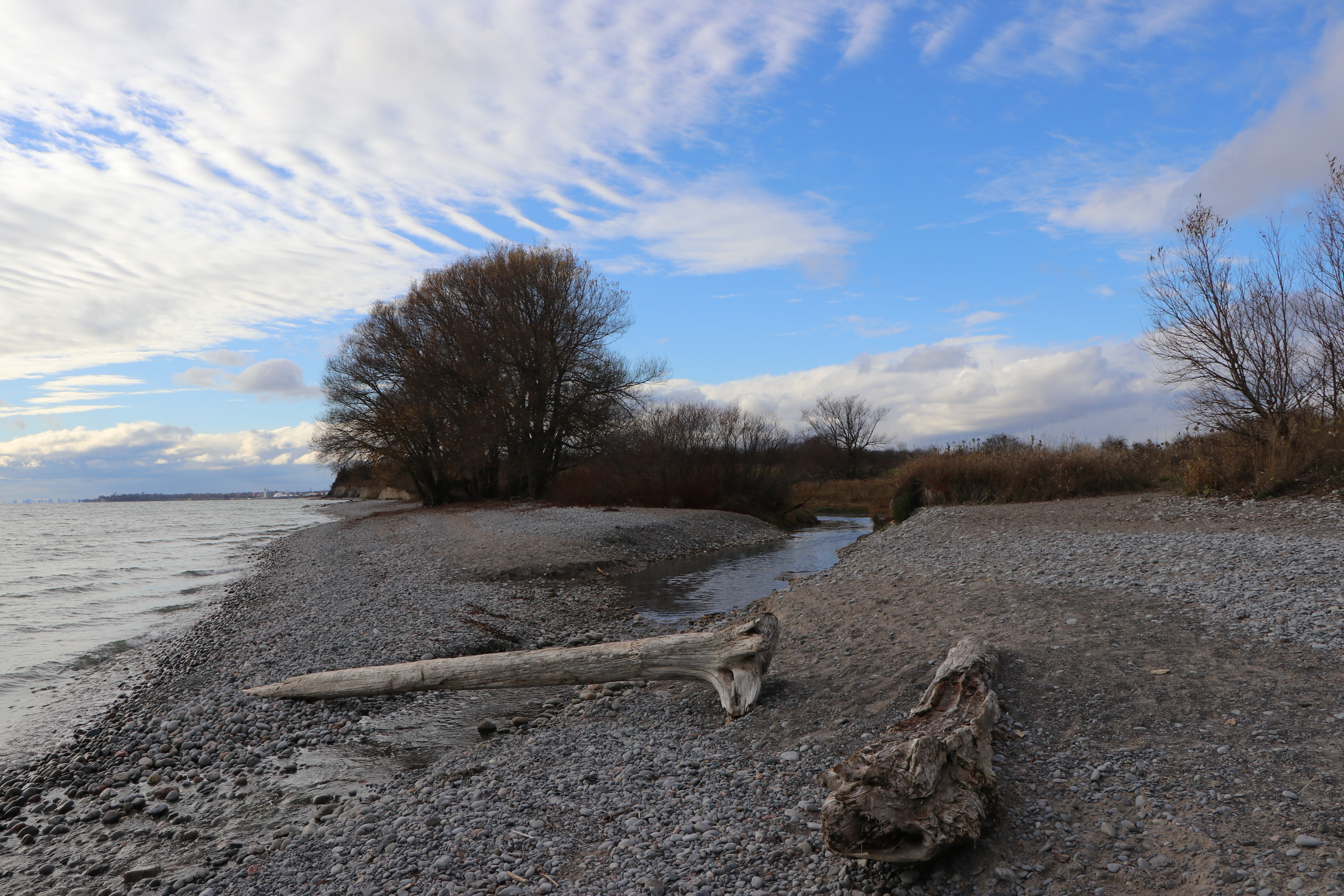
Mouth of the Tooley Creek at Lake Ontario

Tooley Creek is a small watercourse that drains into Lake Ontario near Darlington, Ontario. It drains 1,050 hectares (4.1 sq mi).

Groundwater discharge from the bluffs left from glacial Lake Iroquois feed the headwaters of Tooley Creek.

Its watershed is bordered by the watersheds of three other watercourses, Darlington Creek, Farewell Creek and Robinson Creek.
