= Oshawa Creek =

Coordinates: 43°52′05″N 78°49′45″W

Oshawa Creek is a watercourse that flows 50 kilometres (31 mi) from its headwaters in the Oak Ridges Moraine to its mouth on Lake Ontario, at Oshawa, Ontario. It drains a watershed of 120 square kilometres (46 sq mi). In its lowest reaches, in Oshawa, two tributaries, Goodman's Creek and Montgomery Creek, join the watercourse.

To the west it borders Lynde Creek, which also has its headwaters in the Oak Ridges Moraine, and the shorter watercourses Pringle Creek and Corbett Creek. Bowmanville Creek, to the east, also has its headwaters in the Oak Ridges Moraine, while Farewell Creek, that lies between them, stops short.
