= Oshawa (federal electoral district) =

Federal electoral district in Ontario, Canada

Coordinates: 43.9009°N 78.8454°W

Ontario electoral district
- Interactive map of riding boundaries from the 2015 federal election

Federal electoral district
- Legislature: House of Commons
MP
Rhonda Kirkland
Conservative
- District created: 1966
- First contested: 1968
- Last contested: 2025
- District webpage: profile, map

Demographics
- Population (2021): 131,067
- Electors (2015): 94,928
- Census division: Durham
- Census subdivision: Oshawa (part)

Oshawa (formerly known as Oshawa—Whitby) is a federal electoral district in Ontario, Canada, that is represented in the House of Commons of Canada. It currently consists of the City of Oshawa south of Taunton Road. Historically, the riding was dominated by a working-class electorate.

The riding was first created in 1966 from parts of what are now Oshawa and Whitby, and was very competitive for its first 2 elections. However, the riding quickly became a New Democratic Party (NDP) stronghold during the tenure of Ed Broadbent and the riding continued to be that way until the early 1990s. During this period, the boundaries were changed twice, in 1976 and 1987, with the riding now consisting of southern and central Oshawa.

In the early 1990s, the unpopularity of both the NDP and the Progressive Conservatives (PCs) caused the Liberals to win the seat throughout the 1990s. After the PCs and the Reform Party merged to form the Conservative Party, the NDP tried to take it back by nominating a well-known labour leader but lost by a close margin. In the elections following 2004, the Conservatives continued to increase their share of the vote, as did the NDP to a lesser extent, at the expense of the Liberals. Despite large Liberal gains in 2015, the Conservatives continued to hold this riding. It has been represented by Conservative Colin Carrie since 2004.

== Riding profile ==
The riding currently consists of the City of Oshawa south of Taunton Road.

In 2016, the riding's population was 126,764, an increase of 0.8% compared to the population in 2011. In 2015, the median income in the riding was $32,567, slightly below the Ontario average and up from 30,773 in 2010. The riding has a much lower proportion of visible minorities compared to the rest of the province. In 2016, 11.9% of the riding's population was part of a visible minority, compared to the provincial average of 29.3%. In 2011, about 67% of the riding's population was Christian, which was slightly above the Ontario average. Having no religious affiliation was also slightly above the Ontario average, with about 30% of people in the riding having no affiliation. The riding had historically been dominated by a working-class electorate, but the loss of auto industry jobs in the area since the 1980s has lessened the influence of the working class.

== History ==
=== 1966-1990: Oshawa—Whitby as a marginal seat and dominance of the NDP ===
The riding was first created in 1966 with the Town of Whitby, the City of Oshawa, and part of Whitby Township, which were previously part of the riding of Ontario. In 1967, its name was changed to "Oshawa—Whitby." In the Ontario riding, the previous election was competitive, with the PCs, Liberals, and NDP all being within about 6500 votes (10%) of each other. In 1968, the election was very close. There were over 45,000 votes cast and all 3 candidates were within 325 votes of each other. NDP candidate Ed Broadbent won, beating PC Michael Starr, who won the previous election in the riding of Ontario, by 15 votes. Broadbent and Starr once again ran against each other in the 1972 election. It was also a close race, with Broadbent beating Starr by 824 votes.

In the 1974 election, Broadbent had increased his lead to 11,000 votes, receiving almost as many votes as the Liberal and PC candidates combined at the same time as prominent New Democrats such as David Lewis lost their seats. Shortly after, Broadbent was appointed Parliamentary leader of the NDP then was elected leader of the NDP the following year. In 1976, the riding was modified to now only include the City of Oshawa and its name was changed back to "Oshawa." In 1979, a writer for Maclean's described Broadbent's re-election chances as "considerably better" than his chances in 1968. He was re-elected by a margin similar to his previous victory, though over a PC rather than a Liberal.

By this point, the riding was an NDP stronghold and they continued to win elections by large margins, increasing their margin of victory to 12,000 votes in 1980. Shortly afterward, Prime Minister Pierre Trudeau invited Broadbent to join his cabinet, who rejected his offer. In 1984, Broadbent held on to the seat by a margin of 2000 votes despite the PCs' national landslide victory. In 1986, the riding was modified to exclude the area north of Rossland Road. In 1988, Broadbent would increase his margin of victory to about 4,400 votes over the PCs.

In 1989, Broadbent resigned as NDP leader and announced his retirement as MP later that year. He left parliament on December 31, 1989. By mid-1990, before the by-election, the government of Prime Minister Brian Mulroney was very unpopular. The PCs' vote share dropped from 33.8% to 6.4% while the NDP increased their vote share slightly. The Liberals increased their vote share to 34.4%.

=== 1991-2002: The NDP's fall and the Liberals' success ===
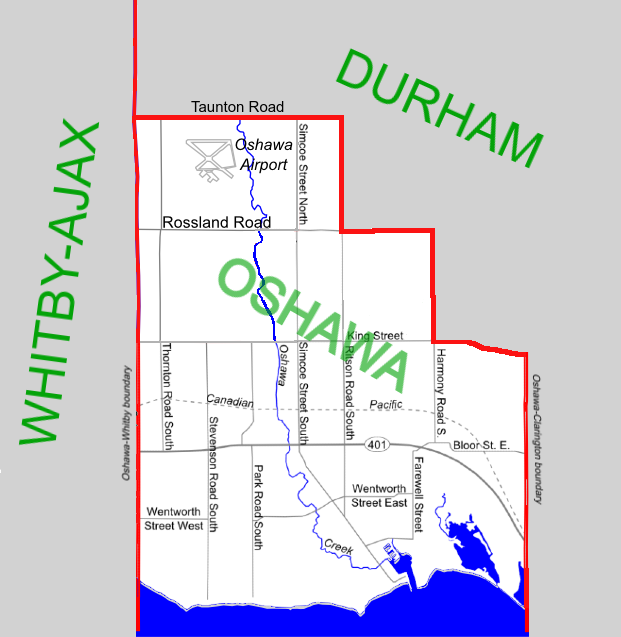
Map of the riding from 1996 to 2003

By the time the 1993 election campaign started, the NDP was also very unpopular. Despite the Liberals' vote share in the riding not increasing much compared to in 1990, Liberal candidate Ivan Grose won as part of the Liberals' near-sweep of Ontario. In 1996, the riding was once again modified. It would lose the part of the riding east of Harmony Road and north of King Street (former Highway 2), but it would gain the area west of Ritson Road between Rossland Road and Taunton Road. The 1993 result for each party did not vary more than 1.2% when redistributed to the new area of the riding.

In 1997, the PCs and the NDP rebounded slightly at the expense of the Liberals and the Reform Party and Grose was re-elected by a slightly smaller margin. In 2000, the Liberals increased their vote share and their margin of victory by about 5%, mostly at the expense of the NDP.

In 2003, the riding was expanded. Initially, the district would consist of the area of Oshawa south of Rossland Road as well as the area east of Ritson Road south of Taunton Road. However, area MP Judy Longfield objected, by which point the proposed boundaries had changed to south of Rossland and south of Taunton west of Ritson. Longfield proposed, citing support from MP Ivan Grose and Oshawa City Council, that the district be changed from the previous version to not include the area west of Simcoe Street north of Rossland Road and the Oshawa Creek north of former Highway 2, but include the area east of Simcoe Street up to Winchester Road. A new Whitby—Oshawa riding would cover the rest of Oshawa. The proposal was implemented and the redistributed result showed minimal change.

=== 2004-2011: The Conservatives take the riding ===
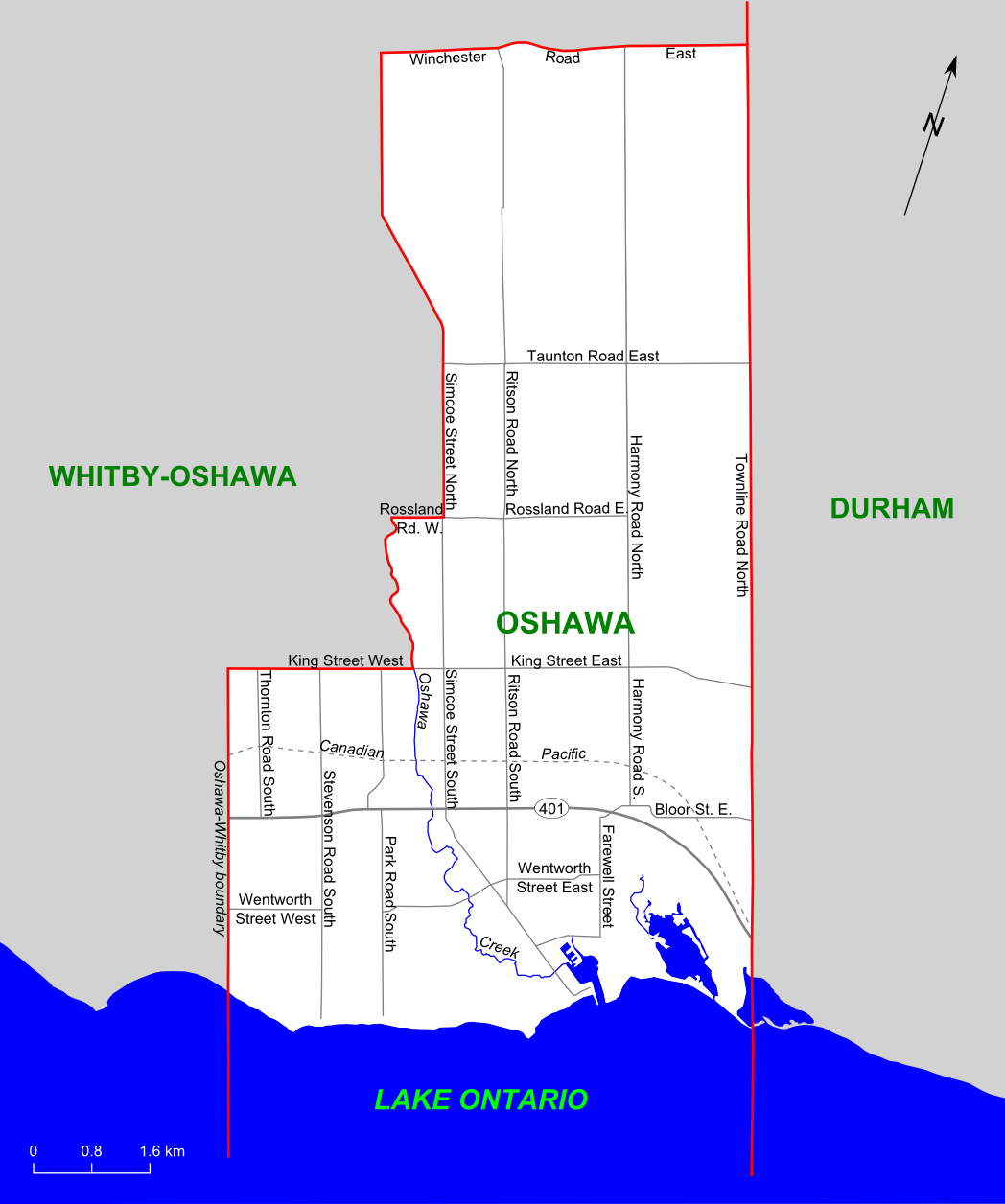
Map of Oshawa riding (2003 to 2012)

In 2004, there was some infighting in the Liberal Party. Grose lost the Liberal nomination for that year's election. It was instead won by Louise Parks. The NDP nominated Sid Ryan, a well-known labour leader. That year's election was very close, with Ryan coming within 500 votes of Conservative candidate Colin Carrie and Liberal candidate Louise Parks was within 1400 votes of Carrie. In the 2006 election, Parks, Ryan, and Carrie ran again. During the 2006 campaign, a writer for The Globe and Mail considered it to be a riding to watch. The NDP increased their share of the vote, but the Conservatives increased their vote share even more. These gains were at the expense of the Liberals, likely due to the recent layoffs at the General Motors Oshawa plant.

The Conservatives would once again increase their vote percentage in the 2008 election and by a higher amount than the NDP, at the expense of the Liberals. The Conservatives now had 41% of the vote, compared to the NDP's 34%. In 2011, a writer for the Toronto Star said that the increasing margins of victory for the Conservative Party over the NDP reflected the transformation of Oshawa from a working-class centre of the auto industry to another Toronto suburb. In the run-up to that year's election, a writer for the National Post considered it to be a potential NDP pickup. The NDP had nominated another union leader, Chris Buckley, president of a local branch of the Canadian Auto Workers union. Despite the NDP's rise nationally, the Conservatives still increased their vote share more than them, now having a majority of the vote in the riding.

=== 2012-present: Nearly being split and continued Tory success ===
During the 2012 redistribution, the riding was originally going to be split into 2 ridings. South of former Highway 2, it would be part of a new riding called "Oshawa—Bowmanville" and the part north of former Highway 2 would be part of the riding of "Oshawa—Durham." During the public hearings, there was opposition to the new boundaries and the commission ended up revising the boundaries to consist of the area of Oshawa south of Taunton Road, despite the fact that the population of the district was now almost 20% above the provincial quota. MPs Erin O'Toole and Colin Carrie later objected, requesting that as much of Oshawa as possible be kept within one electoral district, adding 2 campuses. The commission rejected this.

In the 2015 election, despite the large gains by the Liberals under Justin Trudeau, who now had 27% of the vote in the riding, Carrie was re-elected with 38% of the vote. The NDP did fall, but not as much as the Conservatives to 31%. Shortly after the election, Carrie was appointed to be the Conservatives' Deputy Health Critic. In April 2016, Carrie was promoted to Health Critic. By the 2019 election, Carrie had become the Shadow Cabinet Secretary for Canada-US relations and Economic Development in Southern Ontario.

In April 2019, Forum Research conducted a poll in the riding showing a larger Conservative lead and a large NDP decline. In the 2019 election, Carrie was re-elected again, increasing his vote share slightly while the Liberal and NDP candidates lost 2-4% of the vote each. After the election, Carrie retained his previously held critic roles.

== Demographics ==
According to the 2021 Canadian census

Ethnic groups: 73.8% White, 7.8% Black, 5.3% South Asian, 4.6% Indigenous, 2.4% Filipino, 1.3% Latin American, 1.0% Chinese

Languages: 83.6% English, 1.7% French, 1.0% Spanish

Religions: 52.2% Christian (22.7% Catholic, 6.0% United Church, 4.6% Anglican, 1.9% Pentecostal, 1.6% Baptist, 1.3% Christian Orthodox, 1.2% Presbyterian, 12.9% Other), 3.9% Muslim, 1.7% Hindu, 40.6% None

Median income: $39,600 (2020)

Average income: $47,520 (2020)

== Members of Parliament ==
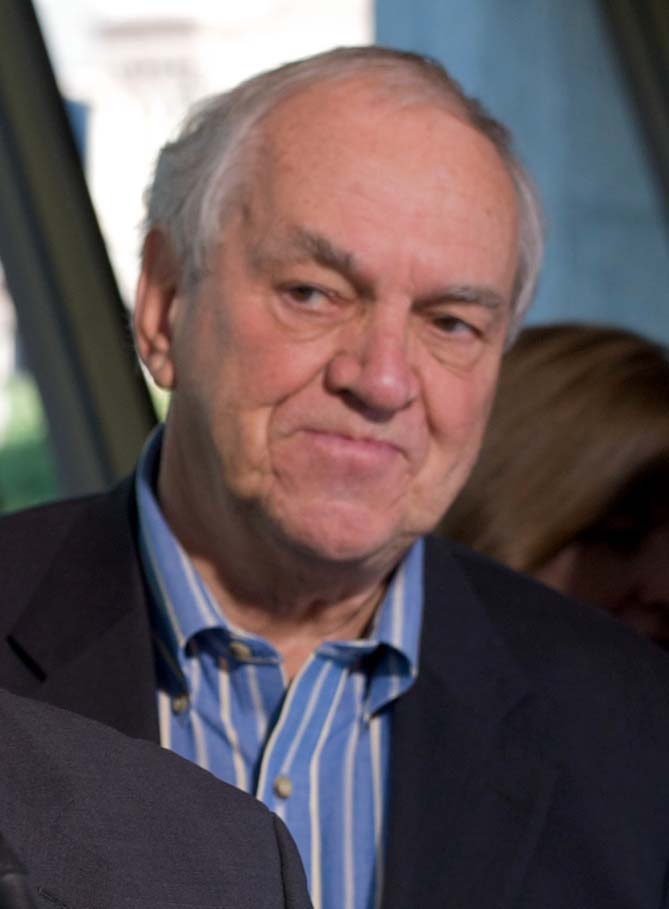
Ed Broadbent in 2008

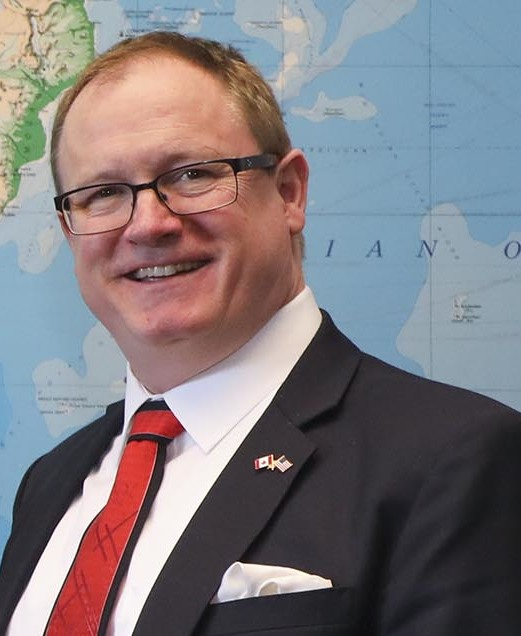
Colin Carrie in 2018

This riding has elected the following members of Parliament:

Parliament	Years	Member	Party
Oshawa—Whitby; Riding created from Ontario
28th	1968–1972	Ed Broadbent	New Democratic
29th	1972–1974	Ed Broadbent	New Democratic
30th	1974–1979	Ed Broadbent	New Democratic
Oshawa
31st	1979–1980	Ed Broadbent	New Democratic
32nd	1980–1984	Ed Broadbent	New Democratic
33rd	1984–1988	Ed Broadbent	New Democratic
34th	1988–1990	Ed Broadbent	New Democratic
34th	1990–1993	Michael Breaugh	New Democratic
35th	1993–1997	Ivan Grose	Liberal
36th	1997–2000	Ivan Grose	Liberal
37th	2000–2004	Ivan Grose	Liberal
38th	2004–2006	Colin Carrie	Conservative
39th	2006–2008	Colin Carrie	Conservative
40th	2008–2011	Colin Carrie	Conservative
41st	2011–2015	Colin Carrie	Conservative
42nd	2015–2019	Colin Carrie	Conservative
43rd	2019–2021	Colin Carrie	Conservative
44th	2021–2025	Colin Carrie	Conservative
45th	2025–present	Rhonda Kirkland	Conservative

== Election results ==
View source data.
Graph of general election results in Oshawa (parties that never received at least 2% of the vote are omitted)

2025 Canadian federal election
Party	Candidate	Votes	%	±%	Expenditures
Conservative	Rhonda Kirkland	32,131	48.17	+8.46	$101,233.56
Liberal	Isaac Ransom	28,653	42.96	+19.84	$31,872.71
New Democratic	Sara Labelle	5,112	7.66	–20.83	$25,704.89
Green	Katherine Mathewson	804	1.21	–0.33	$0.00
Total valid votes/expense limit		66,700	99.22	–0.04	$149,213.09
Total rejected ballots		522	0.78	+0.04	
Turnout		67,222	64.12	+7.83	
Eligible voters		104,837			
Conservative hold		Swing		–5.69	
Source: Elections Canada

2021 Canadian federal election
Party	Candidate	Votes	%	±%	Expenditures
Conservative	Colin Carrie	22,409	39.71	+0.85	$103,754.47
New Democratic	Shailene Panylo	16,079	28.50	-0.01	$34,287.79
Liberal	Afroza Hossain	13,044	23.12	-2.29	$21,770.76
People's	Darryl Mackie	4,029	7.14	+5.18	$9,035.10
Green	Sonny Mir	864	1.53	-3.55	none listed
Total valid votes/expense limit		56,425	99.27	–	$127,337.77
Total rejected ballots		417	0.73	–	
Turnout		56,842	56.27	-4.89	
Eligible voters		100,987			
Conservative hold		Swing		+0.43	
Source: Elections Canada

2019 Canadian federal election
Party	Candidate	Votes	%	±%	Expenditures
Conservative	Colin Carrie	24,087	38.86	+0.69	$111,106.65
New Democratic	Shailene Panylo	17,668	28.50	-3.36	$19,350.32
Liberal	Afroza Hossain	15,750	25.41	-1.92	$17,557.03
Green	Jovannah Ramsden	3,151	5.08	+2.58	none listed
People's	Eric Mackenzie	1,215	1.96		none listed
Communist	Jeff Tomlinson	112	0.18		none listed
Total valid votes/expense limit		61,983	99.34		
Total rejected ballots		414	0.66	+0.29	
Turnout		62,397	61.18	-2.03	
Eligible voters		101,988			
Conservative hold		Swing		+2.03	
Source: Elections Canada

2015 Canadian federal election
Party	Candidate	Votes	%	±%	Expenditures
Conservative	Colin Carrie	23,162	38.17	-12.96	$119,096.25
New Democratic	Mary Fowler	19,339	31.87	-5.23	$124,250.16
Liberal	Tito-Dante Marimpietri	16,588	27.33	+19.67	$26,849.94
Green	Michael Dempsey	1,522	2.51	-1.04	$10.22
Marxist–Leninist	David Gershuny	75	0.12	–	–
Total valid votes/Expense limit		60,686	99.63		$240,095.10
Total rejected ballots		228	0.37	–	
Turnout		60,914	63.21	–	
Eligible voters		96,372			
Conservative hold		Swing		-3.86	
Source: Elections Canada

2011 federal election redistributed results
Party	Vote	%
Conservative	26,837	51.13
New Democratic	19,474	37.10
Liberal	4,022	7.66
Green	1,863	3.55
Others	294	0.56

2011 Canadian federal election
Party	Candidate	Votes	%	±%	Expenditures
Conservative	Colin Carrie	26,034	51.31	+9.95	
New Democratic	Chris Buckley	19,212	37.87	+3.15	
Liberal	James Morton	3,536	6.97	-9.07	
Green	Gail Bates	1,631	3.21	-3.78	
Libertarian	Matthew Belanger	260	0.51	–	
Marxist–Leninist	David Gershuny	61	0.12	-0.12	
Total valid votes/Expense limit		50,734	100.00		
Total rejected ballots		200	0.39	0.00	
Turnout		50,934	57.31	+2.06	
Eligible voters		88,878	–	–	

2008 Canadian federal election
Party	Candidate	Votes	%	±%	Expenditures
Conservative	Colin Carrie	19.951	41.36	+2.76	$83,665
New Democratic	Mike Shields	16,750	34.72	+1.26	$66,814
Liberal	Sean Godfrey	7,741	16.04	-7.94	$62,601
Green	Pat Gostlin	3,374	6.99	+3.22	$9,606
Christian Heritage	Peter Vogel	246	0.51	–	$2,149
Marxist–Leninist	David Gershuny	117	0.24	-0.07	
Canadian Action	Alex Kreider	52	0.10	–	
Total valid votes/Expense limit		48,231	100.00	$89,927	
Total rejected ballots		191	0.39	+0.04	
Turnout		48,422	55.25	-8.62	
Conservative hold		Swing		+0.75	

2006 Canadian federal election
Party	Candidate	Votes	%	±%
Conservative	Colin Carrie	20,657	38.60	+5.39
New Democratic	Sid Ryan	17,905	33.46	+1.23
Liberal	Louise V. Parkes	12,831	23.98	-6.49
Green	Adam Jobse	2,019	3.77	-0.11
Marxist–Leninist	David Gershuny	91	0.17	-0.02
Total valid votes		53,503	100.00	
Total rejected ballots		186	0.35	-0.25
Turnout		53,689	63.87	+6.67

2004 Canadian federal election
Party	Candidate	Votes	%	±%
Conservative	Colin Carrie	15,815	33.21	-10.7
New Democratic	Sid Ryan	15,352	32.23	+21.1
Liberal	Louise V. Parkes	14,510	30.47	-12.4
Green	Liisa Walley	1,850	3.88	
Marxist–Leninist	Tim Sullivan	91	0.19	-0.1
Total valid votes		47,618	100.0	
Total rejected ballots		287	0.60	
Turnout		47,905	57.20	

Note: Conservative vote is compared to the total of the Canadian Alliance vote and Progressive Conservative vote in 2000 election.

2000 Canadian federal election
Party	Candidate	Votes	%	±%
Liberal	Ivan Grose	16,179	42.9	+5.2
Alliance	Barry Bussey	10,863	28.8	+0.5
Progressive Conservative	Bruce L. Wright	5,675	15.1	-1.5
New Democratic	Bruce Rogers	4,203	11.1	-6.3
Marijuana	Craig James Michael McMillan	679	1.8	
Marxist–Leninist	David Gershuny	97	0.3	
Total valid votes		37,696	100.0	

Note: Canadian Alliance vote is compared to the Reform vote in 1997 election.

1997 Canadian federal election
Party	Candidate	Votes	%	±%
Liberal	Ivan Grose	15,925	37.7	-0.5
Reform	Andrew Davies	11,974	28.4	-0.5
New Democratic	Brian Nicholson	7,350	17.4	+2.5
Progressive Conservative	Alan Hayes	6,972	16.5	+1.4
Total valid votes		42,221	100.0	

1993 Canadian federal election
Party	Candidate	Votes	%	±%
Liberal	Ivan Grose	15,574	38.3	+3.9
Reform	Andrew Davies	11,760	28.9	
Progressive Conservative	Linda Dionne	6,137	15.1	+6.4
New Democratic	Michael Breaugh	6,066	14.9	-32.7
National	John Arkelian	387	1.0	
Christian Heritage	Brian Chiasson	383	0.9	-4.2
Natural Law	Helene Ann Darisse	260	0.6	
Commonwealth of Canada	Ann-Marie Methot	73	0.2	
Abolitionist	Christopher Boddy	60	0.1	
Total valid votes		40,700	100.0	

Canadian federal by-election, 13 August 1990
Party	Candidate	Votes	%	±%
On Ed Broadbent's resignation, 2 January 1990
New Democratic	Michael Breaugh	12,046	47.6	+3.3
Liberal	Cathy O'Flynn	8,709	34.4	+13.9
Progressive Conservative	Bill Longworth	1,627	6.4	-27.4
Christian Heritage	Gerry Van Schepen	1,308	5.2	
Confederation of Regions	Garnet Chesebrough	1,024	4.0	
Green	David A.J. Hubbell	243	1.0	
Libertarian	George Dance	117	0.5	-0.6
Social Credit	Ken Campbell	96	0.4	
Independent	Robert Bob Kirk	94	0.4	
Independent	John Turmel	50	0.2	
Total valid votes		25,314	100.0	

1988 Canadian federal election
Party	Candidate	Votes	%	±%
New Democratic	Ed Broadbent	18,410	44.3	+2.0
Progressive Conservative	Nancy McLean	14,040	33.8	-5.0
Liberal	Ed White	8,496	20.5	+2.4
Libertarian	George S. Kozaroff	449	1.1	+0.5
Commonwealth of Canada	Lucylle Boikoff	139	0.3	+0.2
Total valid votes		41,534	100.0	

1984 Canadian federal election
Party	Candidate	Votes	%	±%
New Democratic	Ed Broadbent	25,092	42.3	-9.3
Progressive Conservative	Alex Sosna	23,028	38.8	+10.6
Liberal	Terry Kelly	10,719	18.1	-1.5
Libertarian	Rolf Posma	335	0.6	+0.2
Commonwealth of Canada	Lucille Boikoff	74	0.1	
Communist	Russell Z. Rak	72	0.1	0.0
Total valid votes		59,320	100.0	

1980 Canadian federal election
Party	Candidate	Votes	%	±%
New Democratic	Ed Broadbent	26,761	51.6	+0.4
Progressive Conservative	Jim Souch	14,645	28.3	-4.1
Liberal	Elizabeth Gomes	10,129	19.5	+3.5
Libertarian	Dolores Keys	178	0.3	
Communist	Russell Rak	81	0.2	0.0
Marxist–Leninist	Steve Rutchinski	29	0.1	0.0
Total valid votes		51,823	100.0	

1979 Canadian federal election
Party	Candidate	Votes	%	±%
New Democratic	Ed Broadbent	29,090	51.3	+2.6
Progressive Conservative	Jim Souch	18,369	32.4	+10.2
Liberal	Elizabeth Gomes	9,099	16.0	-12.7
Communist	Russ Rak	80	0.1	-0.1
Marxist–Leninist	Bill Aird	62	0.1	0.0
Independent	Richard Sanders	47	0.1	
Total valid votes		56,747	100.0	

=== Oshawa—Whitby, 1967-1976 ===
1974 Canadian federal election
Party	Candidate	Votes	%	±%
New Democratic	Ed Broadbent	25,013	48.7	+6.8
Liberal	Margaret Shaw	14,783	28.8	+11.1
Progressive Conservative	Martin Weatherall	11,412	22.2	-18.2
Communist	Russell Rak	125	0.2	0.0
Marxist–Leninist	Dennis Deveau	66	0.1	
Total valid votes		51,399	100.0	

1972 Canadian federal election
Party	Candidate	Votes	%	±%
New Democratic	Ed Broadbent	23,757	41.8	+8.2
Progressive Conservative	Michael Starr	22,933	40.4	+6.8
Liberal	Peter Connolly	10,027	17.6	-15.2
Independent	Russell Rak	98	0.2	
Total valid votes		56,815	100.0	

1968 Canadian federal election
Party	Candidate	Votes	%
New Democratic	Ed Broadbent	15,224	33.6
Progressive Conservative	Michael Starr	15,209	33.6
Liberal	Desmond G. Newman	14,899	32.9
Total valid votes		45,332	100.0

== See also ==
- List of Canadian electoral districts
- Historical federal electoral districts of Canada
