= Ivan Grose =

Canadian politician

Member of the Canadian Parliament for Oshawa
- In office 1993–2004
- Preceded by: Mike Breaugh
- Succeeded by: Colin Carrie

Personal details
- Born: 8 October 1928 (age 97) Toronto, Ontario, Canada
- Party: Liberal Party of Canada
- Profession: businessman

Ivan Grose (born 8 October 1928) is a Canadian businessman and politician. Grose was born in Toronto, Ontario. He was the Liberal MP of Oshawa from 1993 to 2004.

From 1947 to 1951, Grose served in the Royal Canadian Air Force.

In 1957 Grose, then 29, held up a bank in Hamilton, Ontario. Grose reportedly took a 22-year-old man who had gone to the Canadian Imperial Bank of Commerce branch hostage with a handgun to his back, and left the bank with $6 000 stuffed into a paper bag. Grose was tried, and eventually pleaded guilty. His time in jail for armed robbery amounted to 19 months. Grose would put his criminal past behind him, becoming a businessman. Before entering politics, he did not seek a pardon.

Grose also was the Charter President of the Royal Canadian Legion Branch 637 in Oshawa.

Grose first stood for federal office as the Liberal Party of Canada candidate for the House of Commons of Canada in the Oshawa district in the 1993 general election. In a Liberal sweep of almost every Ontario seat, Grose defeated New Democratic Party incumbent Mike Breaugh. Grose was the first Liberal MP elected for Oshawa in 47 years.

He was re-elected continuously in the federal elections of 1997 and 2000.

Grose served as Parliamentary Secretary to the Minister of Veterans Affairs from 13 January – 11 December 2003. He was Vice-Chair of the Commons standing committee on Public Accounts during the first session of the 36th parliament, and of the standing committee on Justice and Human Rights during the second session of that parliament, and the first session of the 37th parliament.

Amid considerable infighting in the federal Liberal party in 2004, all incumbent MPs would no longer have their nominations guaranteed. Grose faced challenges for the Liberal nomination from Louise Parkes, a business manager, and city councillor and Deputy Mayor for the city of Oshawa, and from Chris Topple, the Ontario Liberal Party candidate for Oshawa in the two prior provincial elections. Parkes won the nomination over Grose and Topple on the first ballot but finished third behind winner Colin Carrie of the Conservatives and the NDP's Sid Ryan, the second-place finisher, in the general election.

Grose's third term ended on 23 May 2004, on the dissolution of Commons preceding the 2004 general election.
