= Colin Carrie =

Canadian politician (born 1962)

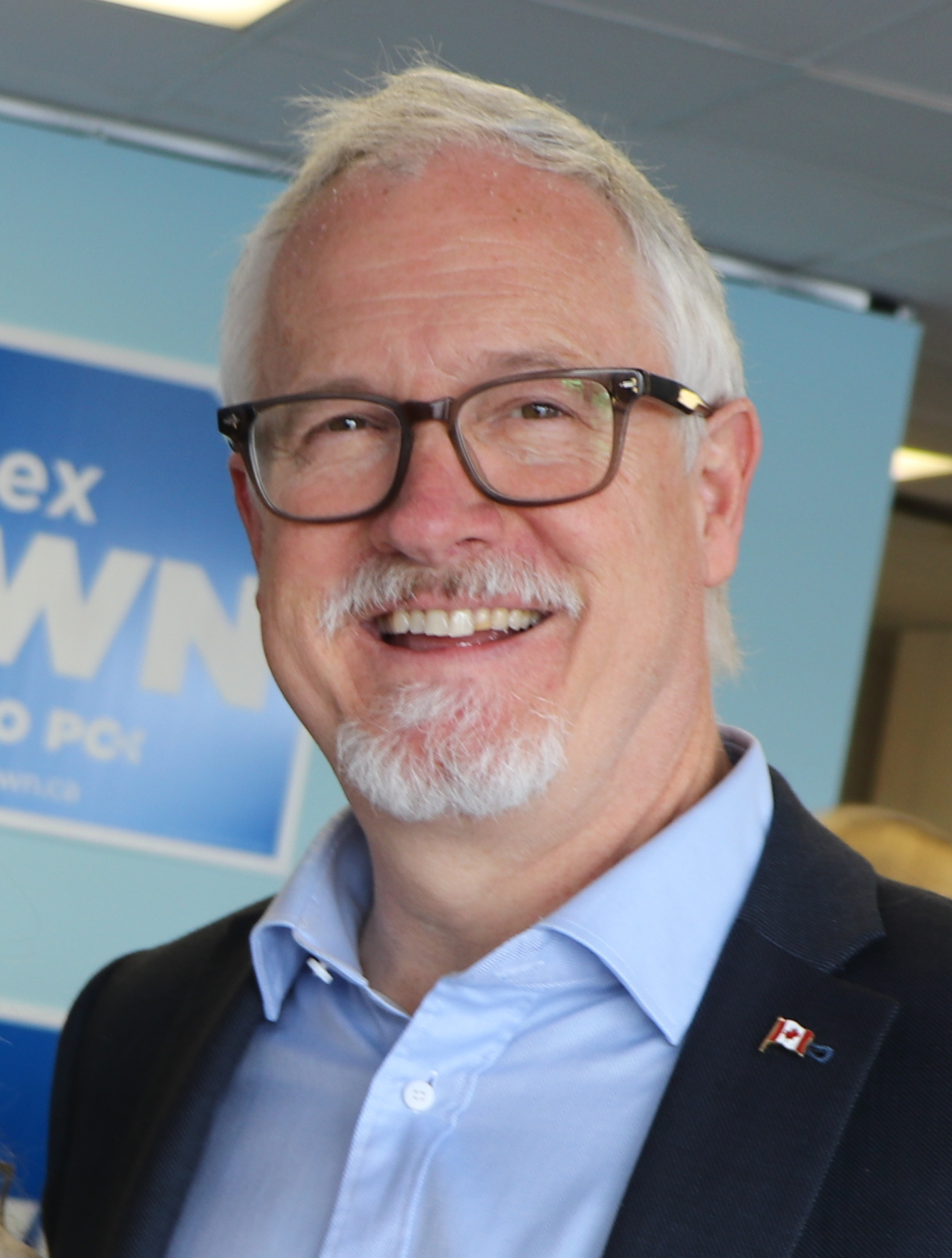
- Carrie in 2022

Member of Parliament for Oshawa
- In office June 28, 2004 – March 23, 2025
- Preceded by: Ivan Grose
- Succeeded by: Rhonda Kirkland

Personal details
- Born: April 11, 1962 (age 64) Hamilton, Ontario
- Party: Conservative
- Profession: Chiropractor

Colin Carrie (born April 11, 1962) is a Canadian politician. He is a former member of the House of Commons of Canada and represented the riding of Oshawa in the province of Ontario for the Conservative Party of Canada from 2004 until 2025.

== Personal life ==
Carrie was born on April 11, 1962, in Hamilton, Ontario. He lived in several Canadian cities before settling in Oshawa at age fifteen. He has a Bachelor's Degree in Kinesiology from the University of Waterloo, and was awarded a Doctor of Chiropractic in 1989 from the Canadian Memorial Chiropractic College. Prior to entering politics, he worked as a chiropractor. He is a past executive member of the Durham Chiropractic Society and former Chair of Spinal Health Week in Durham Region, and has been Financial Secretary of the Oshawa Knights of Columbus. Carrie also served as a Director of the Oshawa Progressive Conservative Party Association, before the party's 2004 merger with the Canadian Alliance to form the Conservative Party of Canada.

== Political career ==
Carrie was first elected as Member of Parliament for Oshawa in the 2004 federal election, defeating NDP candidate Sid Ryan and Liberal candidate Louise Parkes in a close three-way race. In the 38th Parliament, he served as a member of the House of Commons Standing Committee on Health.

During this session, he reintroduced Private Member's Bill C-420 An Act to Amend the Food and Drugs Act (previously introduced by James Lunney) to end the listing of vitamins, minerals and related products as drugs under the Canadian Food and Drugs Act. This measure has been criticized by some as removing a safety provision from the regulation of natural health products. Supporters of the bill argued that it would benefit the position of small producers relative to the pharmaceutical industry. Carrie also served as the founding Chair of the Conservative Party of Canada's Automotive Caucus and was also a member of the Conservative Party of Canada's Energy Caucus and Seniors Caucus.

In a close two-way race with returning NDP challenger Sid Ryan, he retained his seat in the 2006 election as part of the first Conservative government to be elected in Canada in almost 13 years. He once again retained his seat in 2008 federal election. On February 7, 2006, Prime Minister Stephen Harper appointed him to the post of Parliamentary Secretary to the Minister of Industry.

Carrie once again retained his seat in the 2008 federal election. In a two-way race between himself and NDP candidate Mike Shields, Carrie won by a larger margin than his previous two elections. In November 2008, Carrie was appointed Parliamentary Secretary to the Minister of Health by Prime Minister Stephen Harper. During the 40th Parliament Carrie resumed his membership on the House of Commons Standing Committee on Health.

In the 2011 federal election, Carrie won his fourth election in seven years. In an historic election which saw the Liberals relegated to the third party and the Conservatives achieve a majority in the House of Commons, Carrie was elected ahead of his main opponent, NDP candidate and CAW President Chris Buckley, receiving a landslide 51.3% support from Oshawa voters. Carrie won by the largest margin of victory in Oshawa since the NDP's Ed Broadbent in the 1980 federal election.

In September 2013, Carrie was appointed Parliamentary Secretary to the Minister of the Environment.

In the 2015 federal election, Carrie won his fifth election victory in Oshawa. This election saw the Conservatives move from Government to Official Opposition where Carrie was appointed Deputy Critic for Health. Carrie later took on the role of Official Opposition Critic for Health under interim Leader Rona Ambrose. Following the election of Andrew Scheer as party leader, Carrie was given the international relations file.

Under the leadership of Andrew Scheer, he served as Deputy Shadow Minister/Deputy Critic for Economic Development (S. Ontario) and Canada-US Relations. Following the 2019 federal election, they became full critic roles as opposed to deputy roles.

In June 2019, Carrie presented Bill C-461, "an act to amend the Criminal Code and the Judges Act (trafficking in persons)." The Private Member's Bill was proposed to provide judges training on the consequences of human trafficking and specify the legal definition of "human trafficking." The bill passed first reading. Carrie also worked with Oshawa resident Lisa Freeman, whose father was murdered in 1991, to draft a bill aimed at providing greater transparency victims of violent crime and their families during the parole hearing process. Bill C-466, "An Act to amend the Corrections and Conditional Release Act (disclosure of information to victims)," was tabled by MP Lisa Raitt and passed first reading. However, neither bill became law, as the House of Commons went on summer recess shortly thereafter and the 2019 election followed that. As of October 2020, Carrie is working to again propose the bills.

Carrie now sits as a member on the House of Commons Standing Committee for Veterans Affairs.

After the House of Commons introduced a vaccine mandate, Carrie claimed a medical exemption. He attended House meetings virtually.

In February 2023, Carrie, along with fellow Conservative MPs Leslyn Lewis and Dean Allison, had dinner with Christine Anderson, a Member of the European Parliament representing Alternative for Germany, who was on a Canadian tour of right-wing media and convoy protest supporters. The meeting was condemned by the Centre for Israel and Jewish Affairs, the Canadian Anti-Hate Network, and Prime Minister Justin Trudeau among others, for Anderson and AfD's Islamophobic and antisemitic positions. Conservative leader Pierre Poilievre also denounced Anderson's views as "vile", racist, and said that "it would be better if Anderson never visited Canada in the first place". The three MPs released a joint-statement saying that while meetings with foreign elected officials are ordinary, they were unaware of her or her party's views, and that they condemned racist and hateful views.

On April 24, 2024, Carrie announced that he will not seek re-election in the next federal election.

== Electoral record ==
2021 Canadian federal election: Oshawa
Party	Candidate	Votes	%	±%	Expenditures
Conservative	Colin Carrie	22,409	39.71	+0.85	$103,754.47
New Democratic	Shailene Panylo	16,079	28.50	-0.01	$34,287.79
Liberal	Afroza Hossain	13,044	23.12	-2.29	$21,770.76
People's	Darryl Mackie	4,029	7.14	+5.18	$9,035.10
Green	Sonny Mir	864	1.53	-3.55	none listed
Total valid votes/expense limit		56,425	99.27	–	$127,337.77
Total rejected ballots		417	0.73	–	
Turnout		56,842	56.27	-4.89	
Eligible voters		100,987			
Conservative hold		Swing		+0.43	
Source: Elections Canada

2019 Canadian federal election: Oshawa
Party	Candidate	Votes	%	±%	Expenditures
Conservative	Colin Carrie	24,087	38.86	+0.69	$111,106.65
New Democratic	Shailene Panylo	17,668	28.50	-3.36	$19,350.32
Liberal	Afroza Hossain	15,750	25.41	-1.92	$17,557.03
Green	Jovannah Ramsden	3,151	5.08	+2.58	none listed
People's	Eric Mackenzie	1,215	1.96		none listed
Communist	Jeff Tomlinson	112	0.18		none listed
Total valid votes/expense limit		61,983	99.34		
Total rejected ballots		414	0.66	+0.29	
Turnout		62,397	61.18	-2.03	
Eligible voters		101,988			
Conservative hold		Swing		+2.03	
Source: Elections Canada

2015 Canadian federal election
Party	Candidate	Votes	%	±%	Expenditures
Conservative	Colin Carrie	23,162	38.17	-12.96	–
New Democratic	Mary Fowler	19,339	31.87	-5.23	–
Liberal	Tito-Dante Marimpietri	16,588	27.33	+19.67	–
Green	Michael Dempsey	1,522	2.51	-1.04	–
Marxist–Leninist	David Gershuny	75	0.12	–	–
Total valid votes/Expense limit		60,686	100.00		$239,340.16
Total rejected ballots		228	0.37	–	
Turnout		60,914	63.74	–	
Eligible voters		95,561			
Conservative hold		Swing		-3.86	
Source: Elections Canada

2011 Canadian federal election
Party	Candidate	Votes	%	±%	Expenditures
Conservative	Colin Carrie	26,034	51.31	+9.95	
New Democratic	Chris Buckley	19,212	37.87	+3.15	
Liberal	James laMorton	3,536	6.97	-9.07	
Green	Gail Bates	1,631	3.21	-3.78	
Libertarian	Matthew Belanger	260	0.51	–	
Marxist–Leninist	David Gershuny	61	0.12	-0.12	
Total valid votes/Expense limit		50,734	100.00		
Total rejected ballots		200	0.39	0.00	
Turnout		50,934	57.31	+2.06	
Eligible voters		88,878	–	–	
Conservative hold		Swing		+6.8	

2008 Canadian federal election
Party	Candidate	Votes	%	±%	Expenditures
Conservative	Colin Carrie	19.951	41.36	+2.76	$83,665
New Democratic	Mike Shields	16,750	34.72	+1.26	$66,814
Liberal	Sean Godfrey	7,741	16.04	-7.94	$62,601
Green	Pat Gostlin	3,374	6.99	+3.22	$9,606
Christian Heritage	Peter Vogel	246	0.51	–	$2,149
Marxist–Leninist	David Gershuny	117	0.24	-0.07	
Canadian Action	Alex Kreider	52	0.10	–	
Total valid votes/Expense limit		48,231	100.00	$89,927	
Total rejected ballots		191	0.39	+0.04	
Turnout		48,422	55.25	-8.62	
Conservative hold		Swing		+0.75	

2006 Canadian federal election
Party	Candidate	Votes	%	±%
Conservative	Colin Carrie	20,657	38.60	+5.39
New Democratic	Sid Ryan	17,905	33.46	+1.23
Liberal	Louise V. Parkes	12,831	23.98	-6.49
Green	Adam Jobse	2,019	3.77	-0.11
Marxist–Leninist	David Gershuny	91	0.17	-0.02
Total valid votes		53,503	100.00	
Total rejected ballots		186	0.35	-0.25
Turnout		53,689	63.87	+6.67
Conservative hold		Swing		+4.16

2004 Canadian federal election
Party	Candidate	Votes	%	±%
Conservative	Colin Carrie	15,815	33.21	-10.7
New Democratic	Sid Ryan	15,352	32.23	+21.1
Liberal	Louise V. Parkes	14,510	30.47	-12.4
Green	Liisa Walley	1,850	3.88	
Marxist–Leninist	Tim Sullivan	91	0.19	-0.1
Total valid votes		47,618	100.0	
Total rejected ballots		287	0.60	
Turnout		47,905	57.20	
Conservative gain from Liberal		Swing		+1.7

== See also ==
- List of University of Waterloo people
