= Pringle Creek (Lake Ontario) =

Stream in Durham Region, Ontario, Canada

Coordinates: 43°51′23″N 78°55′56″W

Pringle Creek is a small watercourse that drains into Lake Ontario in Whitby, Ontario. It drains 3,102.15 hectares (11.9775 sq mi).

Groundwater discharge from the bluffs left from glacial Lake Iroquois feed the headwaters of Pringle Creek.

On June 19, 2017, police and animal control officials were able to contain, tranquilize and safely relocate a black bear who had wandered into residential areas near Pringle Creek.
