= Sid Ryan =

Canadian politician (born 1952)

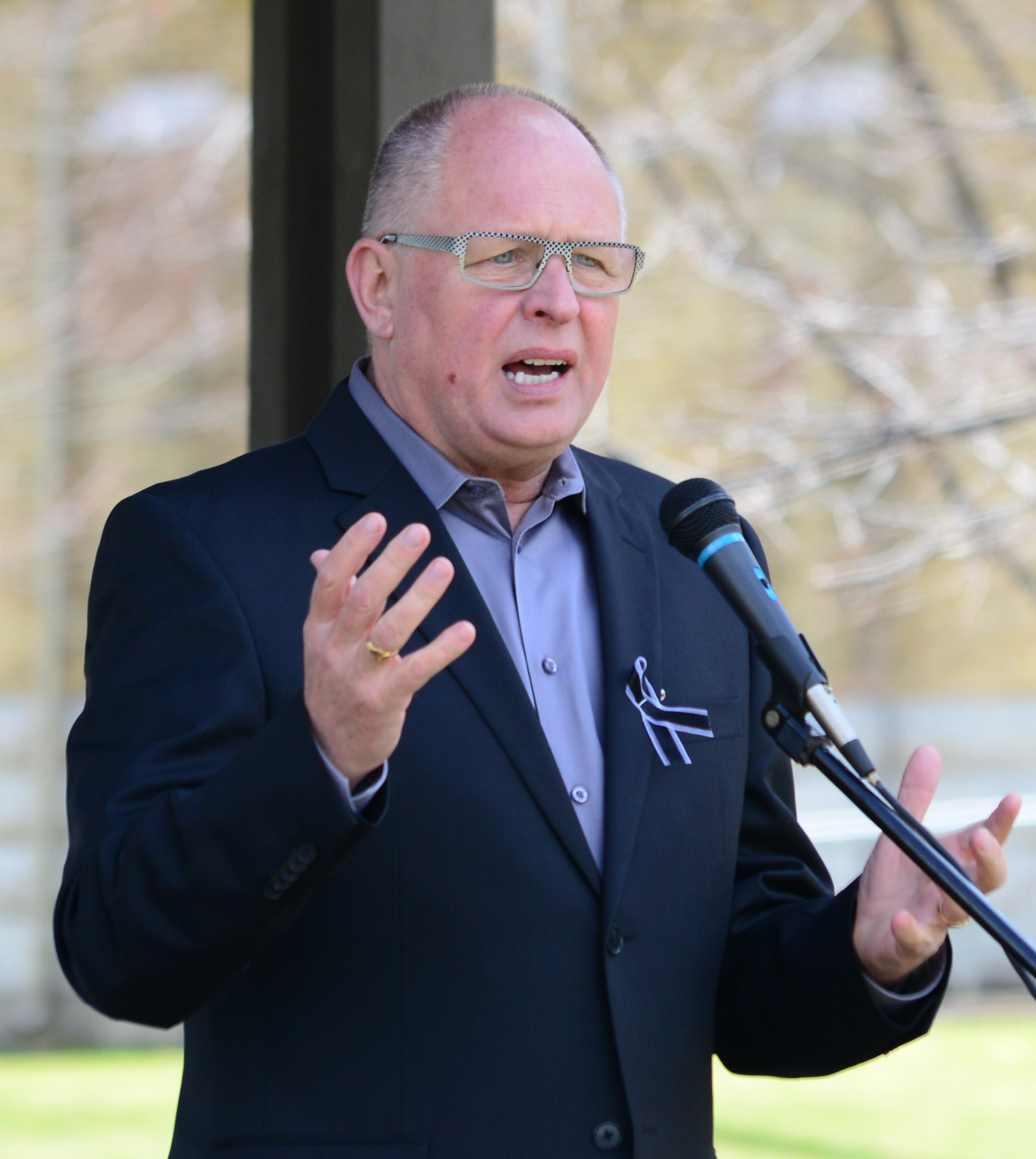
- Ryan in 2015

President of the Ontario Federation of Labour
- In office 2009–2015
- Preceded by: Wayne Samuelson
- Succeeded by: Chris Buckley

President of CUPE Ontario
- In office 1992–2009

Personal details
- Born: Patrick Cyril Ryan; 1952 (age 73–74) Dublin, Ireland
- Party: New Democratic Party

Patrick Cyril "Sid" Ryan (born 1952) is a Canadian labour union leader and politician. Ryan is the former president of the Ontario Federation of Labour.

== Biography ==
Born in Dublin, Republic of Ireland, and third eldest of ten children, Ryan emigrated to Canada at age 22.

Ryan helped organize a United Steelworkers of America (USWA) local where he worked after arriving in Canada. He has been a Canadian Union of Public Employees (CUPE) activist since he went to work for Ontario Hydro in 1976. He served as CUPE Ontario president from 1992 to 2009. Ryan also served as general vice-president of CUPE National until 2009.

Ryan appeared weekly for 10 years on Michael Coren Live and CHEX-TV Durham, CFRB 1010 and writes a bi-weekly column for the Toronto Sun. He is also a guest on TVOntario's current affairs programs, The Agenda with Steve Paikin CBC TV and radio, CTV, CP24. He has written op-ed pieces for Canadian newspapers.

Ryan marched alongside members of the United Farm Workers in California, went to Texas with Ruben "Hurricane" Carter to lobby Texas politicians for a commutation of Stanley Faulder's death sentence, was instrumental in having CUPE Ontario support the BDS campaign in order to pressure the State of Israel. He worked with unions from Canada and South America to defeat the Free Trade Agreement of the Americas (FTAA).

He has worked for the New Democratic Party since arriving in Canada. He ran for the party provincially in 1999, 2003 and 2007, as well as federally in 2004 and 2006. He is the recipient of the Canada 125 Medal, presented to Canadian citizens for their contributions to the good of the community and society in general.

In November 2009, Ryan was acclaimed to the position of president of the Ontario Federation of Labour (OFL). He was re-elected for a second term in 2011 and again in 2013 and retired in 2015. During his six years as OFL president 4 unions withheld union dues from the OFL because they disagreed with Ryan's leadership from the first day he was elected. Canada's largest private sector union, Unifor, which had supported him in the past, refused to support his re-election to a fourth term and instead supported a staff person who worked for Unifor President Jerry Dias. Following his retirement in 2015, Ryan wrote a book 'A Grander Vision'about growing up in Dublin, Ireland and his life in the Canadian labour movement. The book was published by Dundurn Press in April 2019.

== Work with New Democratic Party ==
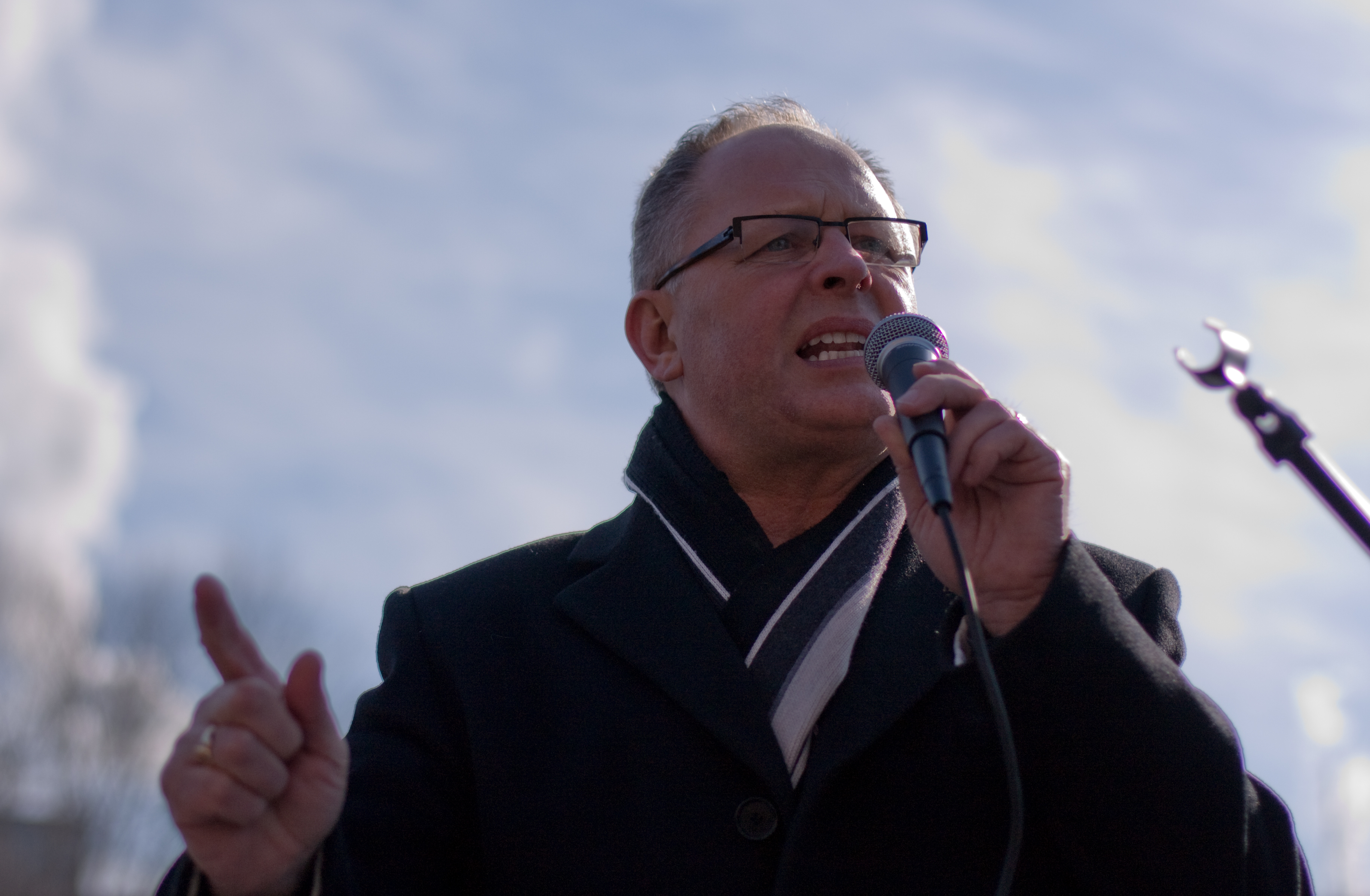
Ryan speaking at a rally at Queen's Park in Toronto in 2009

In addition to his union activities, Ryan has been involved with the New Democratic Party (NDP) since the 1980s. He has served on the Ontario NDP's provincial council and Environment committee, and is a former president of the Durham Centre riding association.

Ryan's affiliation with the Ontario NDP became tenuous in the early 1990s, when some felt that the party had moved to the right under Bob Rae's leadership. On one occasion, he referred to the Rae government's austerity "Social Contract" bill as the most anti-labour piece of legislation he had ever seen. He subsequently resumed supporting the provincial party under Howard Hampton's leadership in a bid to rebuild the NDP/Labour relationship.

Ryan has stood as an NDP candidate in three provincial and two federal election campaigns. He contested Scarborough Centre in the 1999 provincial election, and finished third behind Progressive Conservative incumbent Marilyn Mushinski and Liberal Costas Manios. In the 2003 provincial election, he campaigned in Oshawa and came within 1,109 votes of defeating PC incumbent Jerry Ouellette.

Ryan also stood as a candidate for Oshawa in the 2004 federal election, and lost to Conservative Colin Carrie by 463 votes in a three-way race. He ran again in the 2006 election, but lost by 2,802 votes to incumbent Carrie.

During the last few days of the 2006 election campaign, Alan Clarke, the "sign manager" for the Colin Carrie Campaign distributed a flyer reminding the Membership of CAW Local 222 that the Local was prohibited from supporting Ryan's campaign by a 1993 binding referendum. The flyer showed Ryan and several others having a beer with Alex Maskey the former Lord Mayor of Belfast who was reportedly twice interned for being a member of the IRA. Maskey later became Lord Mayor of Belfast. The flyer also had photos of a bombing in Omagh a town in Ireland and a photo of para military soldier with a rocket launcher on his shoulder Carrie's campaign denied being involved, with manager Andrew Morin suggesting that the leaflet was a product of union squabbling over an endorsement by the Canadian Auto Workers. Morin and Ryan stated that the two campaigns were otherwise on good terms. Elections Canada laid two charges of breaching the Elections Act against Clarke, while Ryan also filed a civil suit. Clarke was later found innocent of the Elections Canada charges and filed a counter-suit against Ryan. Ryan was successful with his lawsuit against Clarke and the Judge ordered Clarke to take out a quarter page ad in The Oshawa This Week newspaper apologising to Ryan and his family for defaming him in the flyer. Clarke was also ordered to pay a sum of money to a charity of Ryan's choice. Ryan alleged that Clarke was working on Carrie's 2006 campaign, which Morin had earlier denied.

In the 2007 Ontario provincial election, Ryan challenged Ouellette for the second time, losing by over 2500 votes, a larger margin than in 2003.

Ryan considered running for the leadership of the federal NDP in 2017 but declined due to his not being able to speak French, and instead endorsed Niki Ashton. In 2026, Ryan endorsed Avi Lewis in that year's federal NDP leadership race.

== OMERS and Bill 206 ==
For more than 10 years Ryan waged a battle with the provincial government to change the governance of the OMERS pension plan. Ryan wanted the government to allow the stakeholders to have control over investments and day-to-day governance of the plan. Pension surpluses were not being used to raise pensions for some plan members.

In 2006, Ryan threatened a political strike after Premier Dalton McGuinty brought in Bill 206, which would change the administration of OMERS but would not fully address CUPE's concerns. However, this met with resistance from a small number of CUPE locals. The employer organization AMO (Association of Municipalities Ontario), together with OMERS administrators fought, to stop Ryan's campaign. McGuinty agreed to make some changes to address CUPE's concerns but refused to withdraw the bill.

== Unbottle It Campaign ==
=== Tap Into Public Drinking Water ===
In early 2009, CUPE Ontario's Sid Ryan and The Council of Canadians' Maude Barlow teamed up in a 15 city tour of Ontario to promote public drinking water systems and to oppose the bottled water industry. Barlow had just been appointed a senior advisor on water to the President of the UN General Assembly. The ultimate goal of the campaign was to have the Ontario Government initiate a ban on the sale of bottled water in public buildings and facilities such as schools, universities, municipal buildings and hospitals. The campaign was successful in getting London City Council to sponsor a resolution to the Federation of Canadian Municipalities (FCM) urging the FCM to call upon all municipalities to consider phasing out the sale and purchase of bottled water from their facilities.

The tour saw great turnouts at stops in Windsor, London, Guelph, Hamilton, St. Catharines, Ottawa, Kingston, Midland, Waterloo, Owen Sound, Brockville, Cobourg, Whitby, Toronto, and Peterborough. "When we don't care what happens to our water treatment plants, the same thing can happen with water as what happened to health care in the United States," said Ryan, in Midland.

"When a city with the international profile of Niagara Falls recognizes this, and recognizes its responsibility to improve access to public water supplies, the days of bottled water are numbered across Canada and around the world", said Barlow.

After the first phase of the tour, CUPE Ontario added a Northern Ontario phase that spring. "Unbottle it!" planned to be in Sault Ste. Marie, Sudbury, Kenora, Thunder Bay and North Bay in April.

== Foreign policy ==
=== Ireland ===
Ryan has a long-standing involvement with the Irish peace process, including acting as three-time International Peace Observer to the process between the Protestant Democratic Unionist Party and the Sinn Féin.

He has written columns and pieces on the violence in his homeland, including an article in the Toronto Sun titled "The Orange, the Green ... and 'the troubles'".

During the 2004 federal election campaign, in which he ran as an NDP candidate, a Conservative Party member produced a leaflet featured a picture of Ryan standing beside Alec Maskey, former Lord Mayor of Belfast. The leaflet was thought to imply that the photo was taken at a Friends of Sinn Féin fundraiser. In response, Ryan's campaign team released a press release emphasizing that the photo was taken at a fundraiser for the Ireland Fund of Canada, a non profit and non partisan charitable organization.

In 2007, Ryan introduced Sinn Féin leader Gerry Adams on the Toronto stop of Adams' speaking tour of North America. Adams was in Toronto to thank those that contributed to the peace process in Northern Ireland.

== Awards ==
Ryan was awarded the Canadian Arab Federation's Social Justice Award in 2007 for his work as an International Peace Observer in Northern Ireland and his championing of Palestinian rights, specifically his strong support for CUPE Ontario's Resolution 50 which called for union members to support the international campaign of boycott, diverstment and sanctions against Israel.

== Electoral history ==
2007 Ontario general election: Oshawa
Party	Candidate	Votes	%	±%
Progressive Conservative	Jerry Ouellette	15,977	39.02	+1.7
New Democratic	Sid Ryan	13,482	32.92	-1.79
Liberal	Faelyne Templer	8,762	21.40	-2.64
Green	Alexander Kemp	2,474	6.04	+4.41
Family Coalition	Jeffrey Streutker	253	0.62	-0.36
Total valid votes		40,948	100.0	

2006 Canadian federal election: Oshawa
Party	Candidate	Votes	%	±%
Conservative	Colin Carrie	20,657	38.60	+5.39
New Democratic	Sid Ryan	17,905	33.46	+1.23
Liberal	Louise V. Parkes	12,831	23.98	-6.49
Green	Adam Jobse	2,019	3.77	-0.11
Marxist–Leninist	David Gershuny	91	0.17	-0.02
Total valid votes		53,503	100.00	
Total rejected ballots		186	0.35	-0.25
Turnout		53,689	63.87	+6.67

2004 Canadian federal election: Oshawa
Party	Candidate	Votes	%	±%
Conservative	Colin Carrie	15,815	33.21	-10.7
New Democratic	Sid Ryan	15,352	32.23	+21.1
Liberal	Louise V. Parkes	14,510	30.47	-12.4
Green	Liisa Walley	1,850	3.88	
Marxist–Leninist	Tim Sullivan	91	0.19	-0.1
Total valid votes		47,618	100.0	
Total rejected ballots		287	0.60	
Turnout		47,905	57.20	

Note: Conservative vote is compared to the total of the Canadian Alliance vote and Progressive Conservative vote in 2000 election.

2003 Ontario general election: Oshawa
Party	Candidate	Votes	%	±%
Progressive Conservative	Jerry Ouellette	14,566	37.32	-9.43
New Democratic	Sid Ryan	13,547	34.71	+12.09
Liberal	Chris Topple	9,383	24.04	-4.98
Green	Karen Tweedle	636	1.63	
Freedom	Paul McKeever	518	1.33	
Family Coalition	Dale Chilvers	383	0.98	
Total valid votes		39,033	100.0	

1999 Ontario general election: Scarborough Centre
Party	Candidate	Votes	%	±%
Progressive Conservative	Marilyn Mushinski	18,189	43.12	-2.75
Liberal	Costas Manios	14,565	34.53	+8.69
New Democratic	Sid Ryan	8,399	19.91	-4.76
Family Coalition	Rina Morra	573	1.36	
Natural Law	Eileen Murray	455	1.08	-0.17
Total valid votes		42,181	100.00	
