= Farewell Creek =

Watercourse in Ontario, Canada

Coordinates: 43°52′10″N 78°48′48″W

Farewell Creek is a watercourse in Durham Region, Ontario that empties into Lake Ontario, at Oshawa. It drains a watershed of 10,726 hectares (41.41 sq mi).

To the west and east it borders Oshawa Creek, and Bowmanville Creek, which have their headwaters in the Oak Ridges Moraine.
