= 1849 =

1849 in various calendars
- Gregorian calendar: 1849; MDCCCXLIX
- Ab urbe condita: 2602
- Armenian calendar: 1298; ԹՎ ՌՄՂԸ
- Assyrian calendar: 6599
- Baháʼí calendar: 5–6
- Balinese saka calendar: 1770–1771
- Bengali calendar: 1255–1256
- Berber calendar: 2799
- British Regnal year: 12 Vict. 1 – 13 Vict. 1
- Buddhist calendar: 2393
- Burmese calendar: 1211
- Byzantine calendar: 7357–7358
- Chinese calendar: 戊申年 (Earth Monkey); 4546 or 4339 — to — 己酉年 (Earth Rooster); 4547 or 4340
- Coptic calendar: 1565–1566
- Discordian calendar: 3015
- Ethiopian calendar: 1841–1842
- Hebrew calendar: 5609–5610
- Hindu calendars
- Vikram Samvat: 1905–1906
- Shaka Samvat: 1770–1771
- Kali Yuga: 4949–4950
- Holocene calendar: 11849
- Igbo calendar: 849–850
- Iranian calendar: 1227–1228
- Islamic calendar: 1265–1266
- Japanese calendar: Kaei 2 (嘉永２年)
- Javanese calendar: 1777–1778
- Julian calendar: Gregorian minus 12 days
- Korean calendar: 4182
- Minguo calendar: 63 before ROC 民前63年
- Nanakshahi calendar: 381
- Thai solar calendar: 2391–2392
- Tibetan calendar: ས་ཕོ་སྤྲེ་ལོ་ (male Earth-Monkey); 1975 or 1594 or 822 — to — ས་མོ་བྱ་ལོ་ (female Earth-Bird); 1976 or 1595 or 823

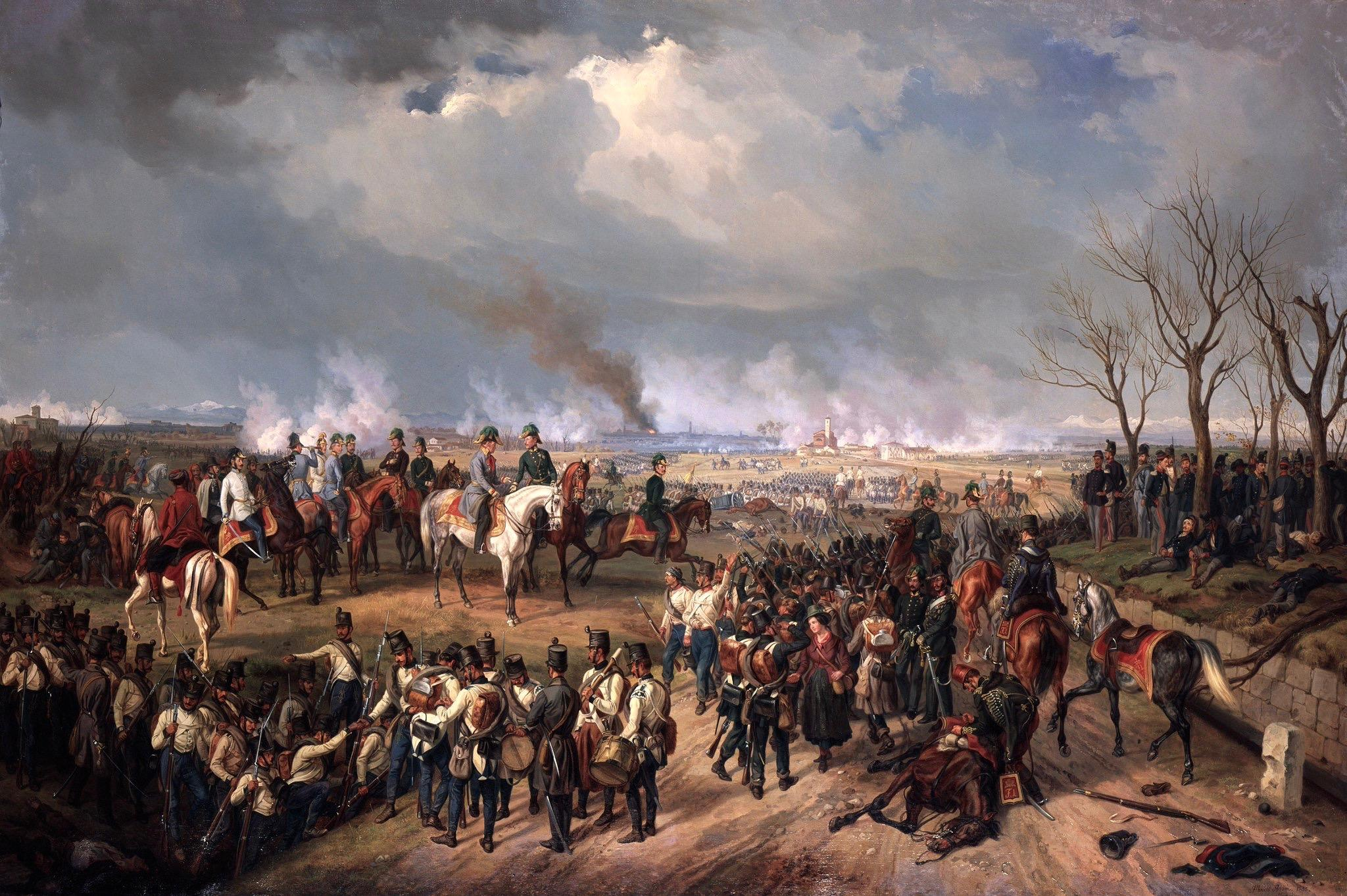
March 23: The pivotal Battle of Novara (1849) is fought in unifying Italy into a single nation.

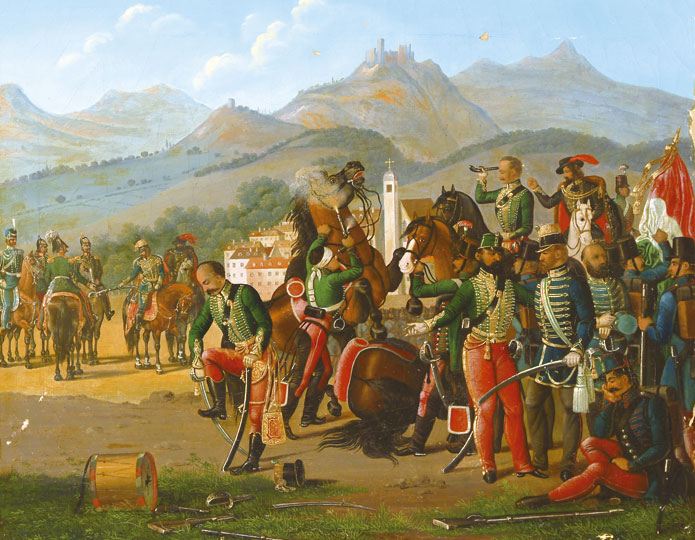
August 13: Hungarian Revolution of 1848 ends with the surrender at Világos of Hungarian rebels to the Russian Army.

1849 (MDCCCXLIX) was a common year starting on Monday of the Gregorian calendar and a common year starting on Saturday of the Julian calendar, the 1849th year of the Common Era (CE) and Anno Domini (AD) designations, the 849th year of the 2nd millennium, the 49th year of the 19th century, and the 10th and last year of the 1840s decade. As of the start of 1849, the Gregorian calendar was 12 days ahead of the Julian calendar, which remained in localized use until 1923.

== Events ==
=== January–March ===
- January 1 – France begins issue of the Ceres series, the nation's first postage stamps.
- January 5 – Hungarian Revolution of 1848: The Austrian army, led by Alfred I, Prince of Windisch-Grätz, enters in the Hungarian capitals, Buda and Pest. The Hungarian government and parliament flee to Debrecen.
- January 8 – Hungarian Revolution of 1848: Romanian armed groups massacre 600 unarmed Hungarian civilians, at Nagyenyed.
- January 13
  - Second Anglo-Sikh War – Battle of Tooele: British forces retreat from the Sikhs.
  - The Colony of Vancouver Island is established.
- January 21
  - General elections are held in the Papal States.
  - Hungarian Revolution of 1848: at Nagyszeben (now Sibiu in Romania)– The Hungarian army in Transylvania, led by Josef Bem, is defeated by the Austrians, led by Anton Puchner.
- January 23 – Elizabeth Blackwell is awarded her M.D. by the Medical Institute of Geneva, New York, thus becoming the United States' first woman doctor.
- January 27
  - The Fayetteville and Western Plank Road Company is incorporated, to build a plank road from Fayetteville to Bethania, North Carolina.
  - The North Carolina General Assembly incorporates the North Carolina Railroad, to complete a rail line from Goldsboro through Raleigh, and Salisbury to Charlotte.
- February 1 – The abolition of the Corn Laws by the United Kingdom's Importation Act 1846 comes fully into effect.
- February 4 – Hungarian Revolution of 1848: Battle of Vízakna – The Austrian army, led by Anton Puchner, defeats the Hungarians, led by general Josef Bem.
- February 5 – Hungarian Revolution of 1848: The Hungarian revolutionary army, led by Richard Guyon, breaks through the pass of Branyiszkó, defeating the Austrian defenders.
- February 8 – A Constitutional Assembly is convened in Rome: the short-lived Roman Republic is proclaimed after midnight (i.e. on 9 February)
- February 9 – Hungarian Revolution of 1848: Battle of Piski – Josef Bem's Hungarian army defeats Anton Puchner.
- February 14 – In New York City, James K. Polk becomes the first President of the United States to have his photograph taken.
- February 21 – Second Anglo-Sikh War: Battle of Gujrat – Forces of the British East India Company defeat those of the Sikh Empire in Punjab.
- February 27 – Hungarian Revolution of 1848: Battle of Kápolna – The Austrians defeat the Hungarians.
- February 28 – Regular steamboat service from the west to the east coast of the United States begins, with the arrival of the SS California in San Francisco Bay. The California leaves New York Harbor on October 6, 1848, rounds Cape Horn at the tip of South America, and arrives at San Francisco after the 4-month, 21-day journey.
- March 3
  - The United States Department of the Interior is established, incorporating the Census Office, United States General Land Office, Office of Indian Affairs and Patent and Trademark Office.
  - Minnesota becomes a United States territory.
  - The United States Congress passes the Gold Coinage Act allowing the minting of two additional denominations of gold coins, the gold dollar and the double eagle.
- March 4 – Hungarian Revolution of 1848: The Habsburg emperor Franz Joseph I of Austria promulgates at Olomouc the March Constitution of Austria, which abolishes the April Laws promulgated by the Hungarian Batthyány-govern, and degrades Hungary to a simple Austrian province.
- March 5 – Hungarian Revolution of 1848: Second Battle of Szolnok – The Hungarians led by János Damjanich and Károly Vécsey defeat the Austrians.
- March 11 – Hungarian Revolution of 1848: The Hungarian army of Transylvania, under general Josef Bem, defeats the Russian-Austrian army at Second Battle of Nagyszeben, capturing the city which is the headquarters of Austrian general Anton Puchner. Most of Transylvania is liberated from the Austrian rule. The Austrian and the Russian troops flee to Wallachia.
- March 23 – First Italian War of Independence: Battle of Novara – The Kingdom of Sardinia suffers a huge defeat after a two day battle, and King Charles Albert of Sardinia abdicates.
- March 28
  - Four Christians are ordered to be burnt alive in Antananarivo, Madagascar, by Queen Ranavalona I; 14 others are executed.
  - The Frankfurt National Assembly adopts the Frankfurt Constitution, providing for a constitutional monarchy for Germany under a hereditary emperor and with a two-chamber parliament.
- March 29
  - The Second Anglo-Sikh War ends, with the United Kingdom annexing the Punjab.
  - Maharaja Duleep Singh is exiled to England.
- March – The Frankfurt Parliament completes its drafting of a liberal constitution, and elects Frederick William IV emperor of the new German national state.

=== April–June ===
- April 1
  - After 10 days, the insurrection in Brescia is ended by Austrian troops.
  - Hungarian Revolution of 1848: The Hungarian Revolutionary Army, under the leadership of Arthur Görgey, starts the victorious Spring Campaign, which leads to the liberation of much of Hungary from the Austrian forces.
- April 2
  - The German revolutions of 1848–49 end in failure, as King Frederick William IV of Prussia refuses to accept the offer of the Frankfurt National Assembly, to be crowned as German emperor.
  - Hungarian Revolution of 1848 – Battle of Hatvan: The Hungarian revolutionary army, under the command of András Gáspár, defeats the Austrians, led by general Franz Schlik.
- April 4 – Hungarian Revolution of 1848 – Battle of Tápióbicske: Hungarian forces, under the generals György Klapka and János Damjanich, defeat the Austrian-Croatian army, led by Franz Schlik and Josip Jelačić.
- April 6 – Hungarian Revolution of 1848 – Battle of Isaszeg: The main Hungarian forces, led by Arthur Görgey, defeat the main imperial forces, led by Alfred I, Prince of Windisch-Grätz, forcing them to retreat westward.
- April 10 – Hungarian Revolution of 1848 – Battle of Vác: The Hungarians, led by János Damjanich, defeat the Austrians, led by Christian Götz, who dies after the battle due to his injuries.
- April 12
  - Hungarian Revolution of 1848: Because of his series of defeats suffered from the Hungarian army, Alfred I, Prince of Windisch-Grätz is released from the supreme command of the Austrian forces in Hungary, and replaced by Ludwig von Welden.
  - Astronomer Annibale de Gasparis discovers the asteroid 10 Hygiea.
- April 14 – Hungarian Revolution of 1848: The Hungarian revolutionary parliament in Debrecen declares independence from the Habsburg Empire.
- April 19 – Hungarian Revolution of 1848 – Battle of Nagysalló: The Hungarian revolutionary army, led by György Klapka and János Damjanich, defeat the Austrian army, led by Lt. Gen. Ludwig von Wohlgemuth.
- April 21
  - Great Famine (Ireland): 96 inmates of the overcrowded Ballinrobe Union Workhouse died over the course of the preceding week from illness and other famine-related conditions, a record high.
  - The Austrian government asks Russian help against the Hungarian Revolution. Tsar Nicholas I of Russia agrees to send troops against Hungary.
- April 22 – The first Kennedy arrives in America.
- April 25 – James Bruce, 8th Earl of Elgin, the Governor General of Canada, signs the Rebellion Losses Bill, outraging Montreal's English population and triggering the Montreal Riots.
- April 26 – Hungarian Revolution of 1848 – Battle of Komárom: Hungarian forces relieve the city and castle with the same name from a long Austrian siege. The Austrian imperial forces and their Croatian, Romanian and Serbian allies are chased out from Hungary, or near the borders of the country.
- April 27 – Giuseppe Garibaldi enters Rome, to defend it from the French troops of General Charles Oudinot.
- May – The Second Carlist War ends in Spain.
- May 2 – Hungarian Revolution of 1848: A new independent Hungarian government, led by Bertalan Szemere, is formed. The head of state of Hungary becomes Lajos Kossuth, as governor president.
- May 3
  - The May Uprising in Dresden, last of the German revolutions of 1848–49, begins. Richard Wagner is among the participants.
  - The Mississippi River levee at Sauvé's Crevasse breaks, flooding much of New Orleans.
- May 9 – The May Uprising in Dresden is suppressed by the Kingdom of Saxony.
- May 10 – The Astor Place Riot takes place in Manhattan, over a dispute between two Shakespearean actors; over 20 people are killed when troops fire on the rioters.
- May 15 – Troops of the Kingdom of the Two Sicilies take Palermo, and crush the republican government of Sicily.
- May 17 – The St. Louis Fire starts when a steamboat catches fire and nearly burns down the entire city.
- May 21 – Hungarian Revolution of 1848: The Hungarian army, led by Arthur Görgey, captures the Castle of Buda, liberating the Hungarian capital city completely. The leader of the defending Austrian forces, General Heinrich Hentzi, dies because of his injuries. The Hungarian government moves back from Debrecen to Budapest.
- May 30 – Hungarian Revolution of 1848: Julius Jacob von Haynau replaces Ludwig von Welden as leader of the Austrian forces in Hungary, because of the failure of the latter to stop the advance of the Hungarian forces.
- June 5
  - Denmark becomes a constitutional monarchy.
  - Hungarian Revolution of 1848: The first Russian troops, led by Lieutenant General Fyodor Sergeyevich Panyutin, who come in the aid of the Habsburgs, cross the Hungarian border at Pozsony, in order to crush the Hungarian revolution.
- June 6 – The settlement of Fort Worth, Texas, is founded.
- June 17 – Hungarian Revolution of 1848: The main Russian forces, led by Ivan Paskevich, cross the Hungarian border, and together with the Austrian troops, led by Julius Jacob von Haynau, start the final attack against the Hungarian Revolution. Now the Hungarian revolutionary troops, numbering 173,000 soldiers, which even before the Russian attack were in inferiority regarding their numbers, and the quality of their weapons and war industry, face a force of 370,000 Austro-Russian forces, and other tens of thousands of Croatian, Serbian and Romanian insurgents, who serve the Habsburg imperial interests.
- June 18 – The Stuttgart Rump Parliament, made up of the remaining 154 mostly democratic and republican deputies of the Frankfurt National Assembly who moved there in early June, is dissolved by Württemberg military. Most of the liberal and conservative deputies of the National Assembly had already laid down their mandates in May under pressure of the Austrian and Prussian governments.
- June 20 – Hungarian Revolution of 1848: Russian troops, under the command of Alexander von Lüders, break in Transylvania, and, together with the Austrian forces, start to operate against the Hungarian troops, led by Józef Bem.
- June 21 – Hungarian Revolution of 1848: The Russo-Austrian army, led by Julius Jacob von Haynau, defeats the Hungarians under the command of Arthur Görgey in the Battle of Pered.
- June 28 – Hungarian Revolution of 1848: The Austrian army, led by Julius Jacob von Haynau, defeats the Hungarians, led by Ernő Poeltenberg, in the Battle of Győr. The Hungarian army is forced to retreat towards Budapest.

=== July–September ===
- July 2 – Hungarian Revolution of 1848 – Second Battle of Komárom: The Hungarian army, led by Arthur Görgey, repulses the combined attack of the Austrian and Russian troops led by Julius Jacob von Haynau. During the battle Görgey suffers a heavy head injury, which prevents him from taking advantage of this success.
- July 3 – French troops occupy Rome; the Roman Republic surrenders.
- July 6 – Battle of Fredericia: The Danish Army beats the Prussian army at Fredericia, Jutland, thereby putting an end to the Prussian-Danish War until 1864.
- July 11 – Hungarian Revolution of 1848 – Third Battle of Komárom: The Hungarian army, led by Arthur Görgey, is defeated by the Austrians, led by Julius Jacob von Haynau.
- July 13 – Charleston Workhouse Slave Rebellion: A slave uprising led by Nicholas Kelly took place at the Workhouse in Charleston, South Carolina; the white community quickly suppressed the revolt, captured 37 freedom seekers, and tried and hanged 3 of the leaders.
- July 14 – Hungarian Revolution of 1848:
  - Because of the imminent Austrian attack, the Hungarian government moves from Budapest to Szeged.
  - Hungarian troops, led by Richard Guyon, defeat the Croatian-Austrian army led by Josip Jelačić in the Battle of Kishegyes, securing southern Hungary for the revolutionary government.
- July 15 – The first airstrike in history: Austria launches pilotless balloons against the city of Venice.
- July 17 – Hungarian Revolution of 1848: Hungarians, led by Arthur Görgey, and the Russians, led by Ivan Paskevich, battle indecisively in the Second Battle of Vác. The Russians are unsuccessful in destroying the Hungarian army, which retreats towards the east.
- July 23
  - French scientist Hippolyte Fizeau makes a measurement of the speed of light in air using a specially devised apparatus.
  - German revolutionaries capitulate in the Rastatt Fortress in Baden to Prussian troops, marking the end of the Imperial Constitution campaign in which radical democrats tried to defend the revolution. Other centres of resistance had been the Bavarian Palatinate, Westphalia, and the Rhineland but these had quickly been subdued by counter-revolutionary forces.
- July 28 – Hungarian Revolution of 1848: The Hungarian government, led by Bertalan Szemere promulgates the Nationality Law, which gives important rights to the nationalities of Hungary, like the right to use their mother tongue in school, church, army, court and administration. The Romanians are declared a nation, and not a minority, in Transylvania. The Jews receive equality thanks to the Emancipation Decree.
- July 31 – Hungarian Revolution of 1848 – Battle of Segesvár: The Russian troops in Transylvania, led by Alexander von Lüders, crush the Hungarian forces, under the lead of Józef Bem. Hungarian poet and revolutionary Sándor Petőfi is killed in the battle by the Russians.
- July 31–August 1 – Joven Daniel wrecks at the coast of Araucanía, Chile, leading to allegations that local Mapuche tribes murdered survivors and kidnapped Elisa Bravo.
- August 2 – Hungarian Revolution of 1848: The Russian main forces, under Ivan Paskevich, defeat the Hungarian army under József Nagysándor, in the Battle of Debrecen.
- August 3 – Hungarian Revolution of 1848: The Hungarian defenders of Komárom, led by György Klapka, destroy the besieging Austrian forces in the Fourth Battle of Komárom, liberating Győr and Székesfehérvár. But this victory comes too late to change the course of military events in the eastern part of the country, where the Hungarian forces are about to crumble under the heavy Austro-Russian pressure.
- August 5 – Hungarian Revolution of 1848 – Battle of Szőreg: Austrian forces, under Julius Jacob von Haynau, defeat the Hungarian main forces under Henryk Dembiński.
- August 9 – Hungarian Revolution of 1848 – Battle of Temesvár: The main Russo-Austrian forces, led by Julius Jacob von Haynau, win a decisive victory against the Hungarians, led by Józef Bem.
- August 11 – Hungarian Revolution of 1848: Lajos Kossuth and the Hungarian Government of Bertalan Szemere resign, and give all powers to the hands of Arthur Görgey. After this Kossuth, the ministries and many military officers leave Hungary and seek asylum in Turkey.
- August 13 – Hungarian Revolution of 1848: The main Hungarian army, under the lead of Arthur Görgey, capitulates to the Russian troops, led by Theodor von Rüdiger, at Világos. The official end of the Hungarian Revolution, although the fortress of Komárom continue to resist.
- August 28 – Venice (the Republic of San Marco) surrenders to Austrian troops after a 4-month siege.
- September 1 – The first segment of the Pennsylvania Railroad, from Lewistown to Harrisburg, opens for service.
- September 17 – African-American abolitionist Harriet Tubman escapes from slavery.

=== October–December ===
- October 4 – Hungarian Revolution of 1848: Komárom, the last bastion of the Hungarian Revolution, surrenders to the Austrian forces.
- October 6 – Hungarian Revolution of 1848: The 13 Martyrs of Arad are executed after the Hungarian War of Independence, in repression by the Austrian authorities led by Julius Jacob von Haynau (these martyrs being the generals of the Hungarian revolutionary army, who did not flee from Hungary after the suppression of the Hungarian revolution by the Russo-Austrian forces). Also today, Lajos Batthyány, the first Hungarian prime minister, is executed by Austrian authorities in Pest.
- November – Austin College receives a charter in Huntsville, Texas.
- November – English-born merchant Joshua Norton, the future "Emperor Norton", arrives in San Francisco.
- November 13
  - The Constitution of California is ratified in a general election.
  - Swiss-born Marie Manning and her husband Frederick are publicly hanged for the murder of her lover in London, before a crowd of 30,000-50,000.
- November 16 – A Russian court sentences Fyodor Dostoyevsky to death for anti-government activities linked to a radical intellectual group, the Petrashevsky Circle. Facing a firing squad on December 23, the group members are reprieved at the last moment, and exiled to the katorga prison camps in Siberia.
- December 3
  - German missionaries Johann Ludwig Krapf and Johannes Rebmann become the first Europeans to see Mount Kenya.
  - The Abgeordnetenhaus, lower house of the parliament of the Kingdom of Bavaria, passes a bill granting German Jews the same legal rights as German Christians. The measure draws a strong reaction from Christians across Bavaria, who sign petitions urging the upper house to prevent the equal rights measure from becoming law.
- December 22 – After 17 days of deadlock and 63 votes, Democrat Howell Cobb of Georgia is elected Speaker of the United States House of Representatives, by a plurality of 102 votes to 99 for the former Speaker, the Whig Party's Robert C. Winthrop of Massachusetts. Neither the Democrats nor the Whigs have a majority of the 230 seats in the House, and after neither candidate can obtain the required 116 votes, the Representatives agree that the plurality will decide the leadership.

=== Date unknown ===
- Seven of the "best known" opium clippers go missing: Sylph, Coquette, Kelpie, Greyhound, Don Juan, Mischief, and Anna Eliza.
- A cholera epidemic in New York kills 5,000.
- Global healthcare and pharmaceutical company Pfizer founded in New York, United States.

== Births ==
=== January–March ===
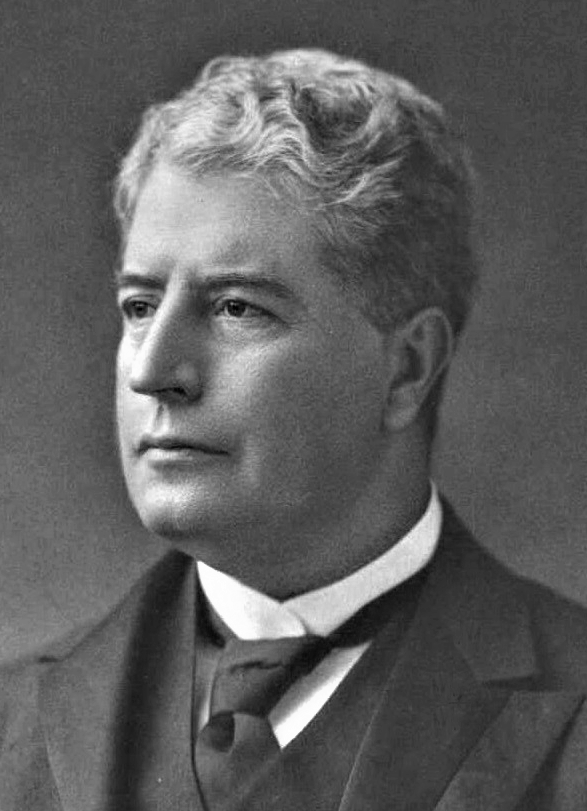
Edmund Barton

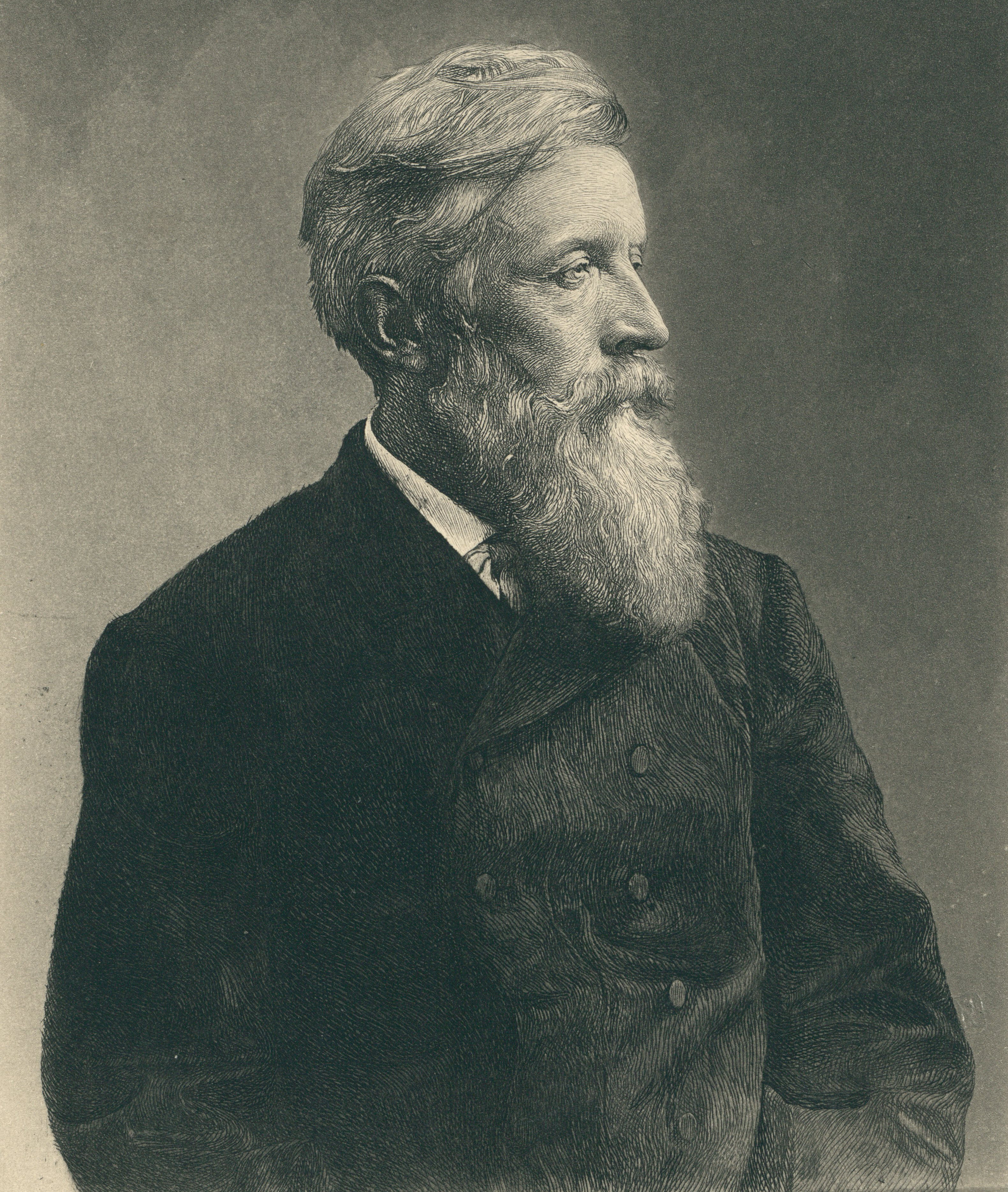
Aleksander Świętochowski

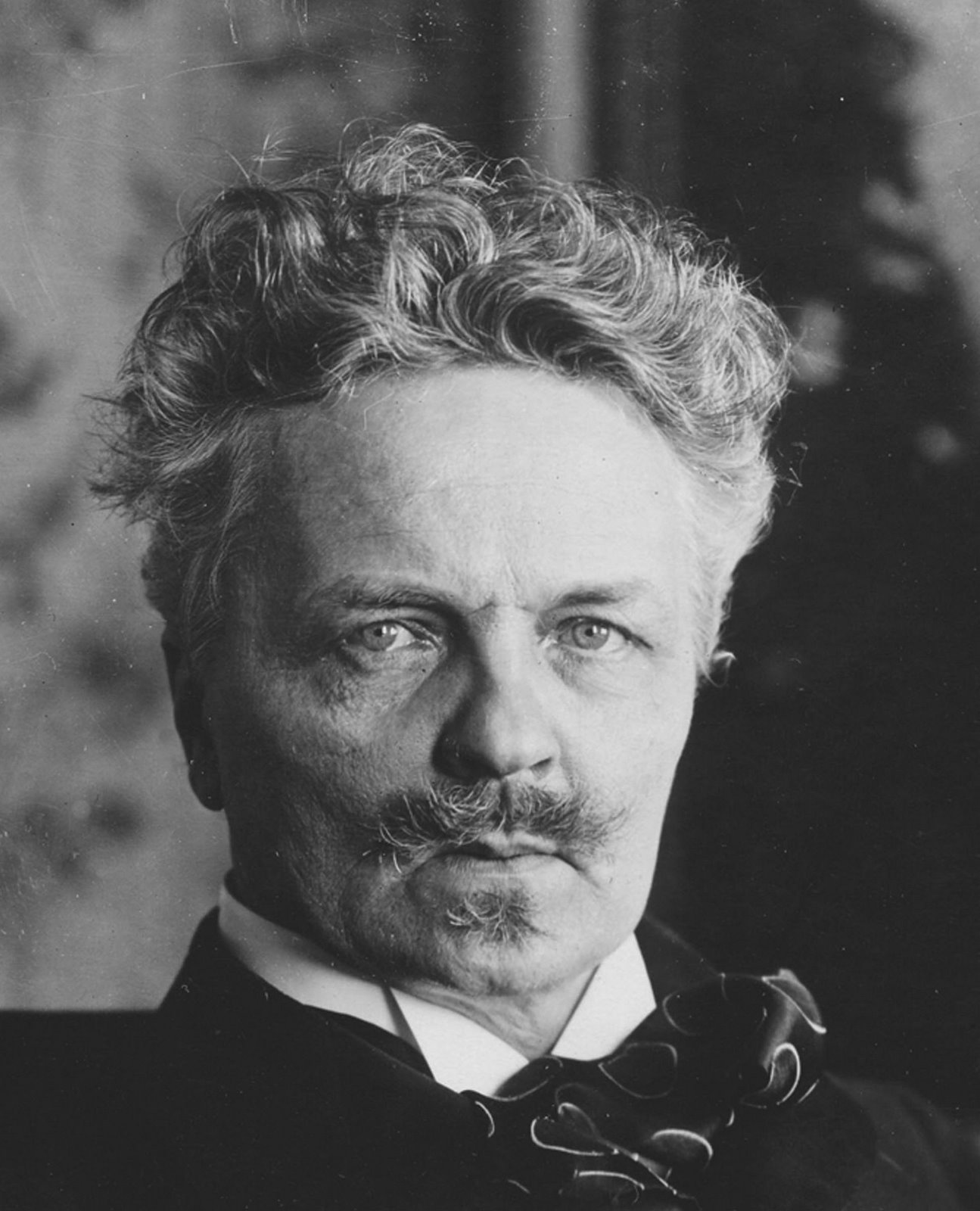
August Strindberg

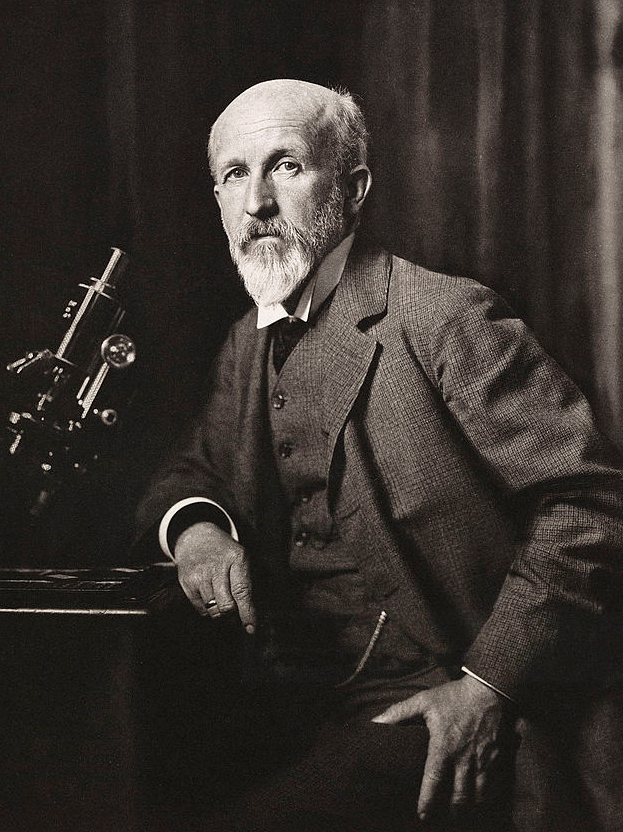
Oscar Hertwig

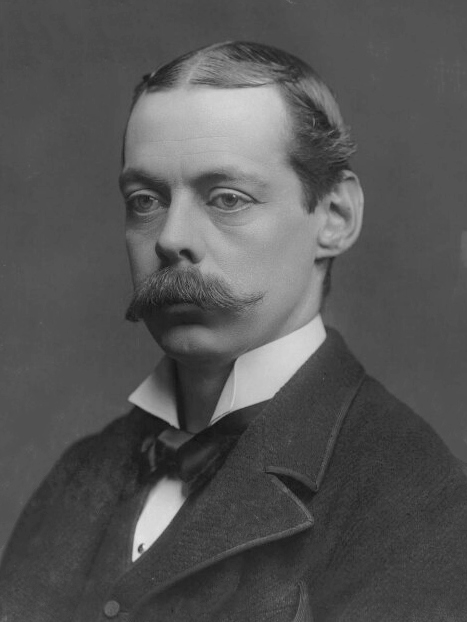
Lord Randolph Churchill

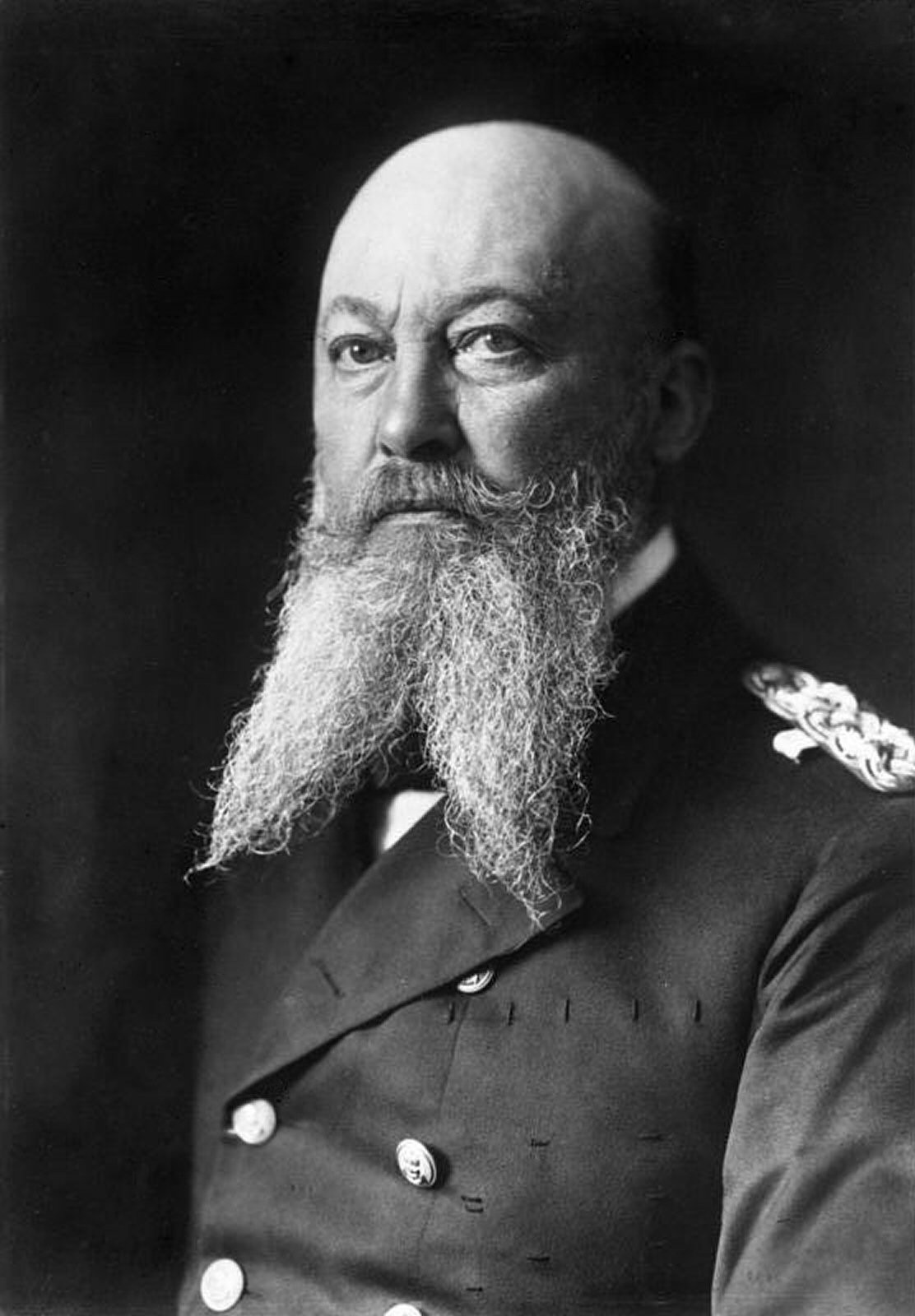
Alfred von Tirpitz

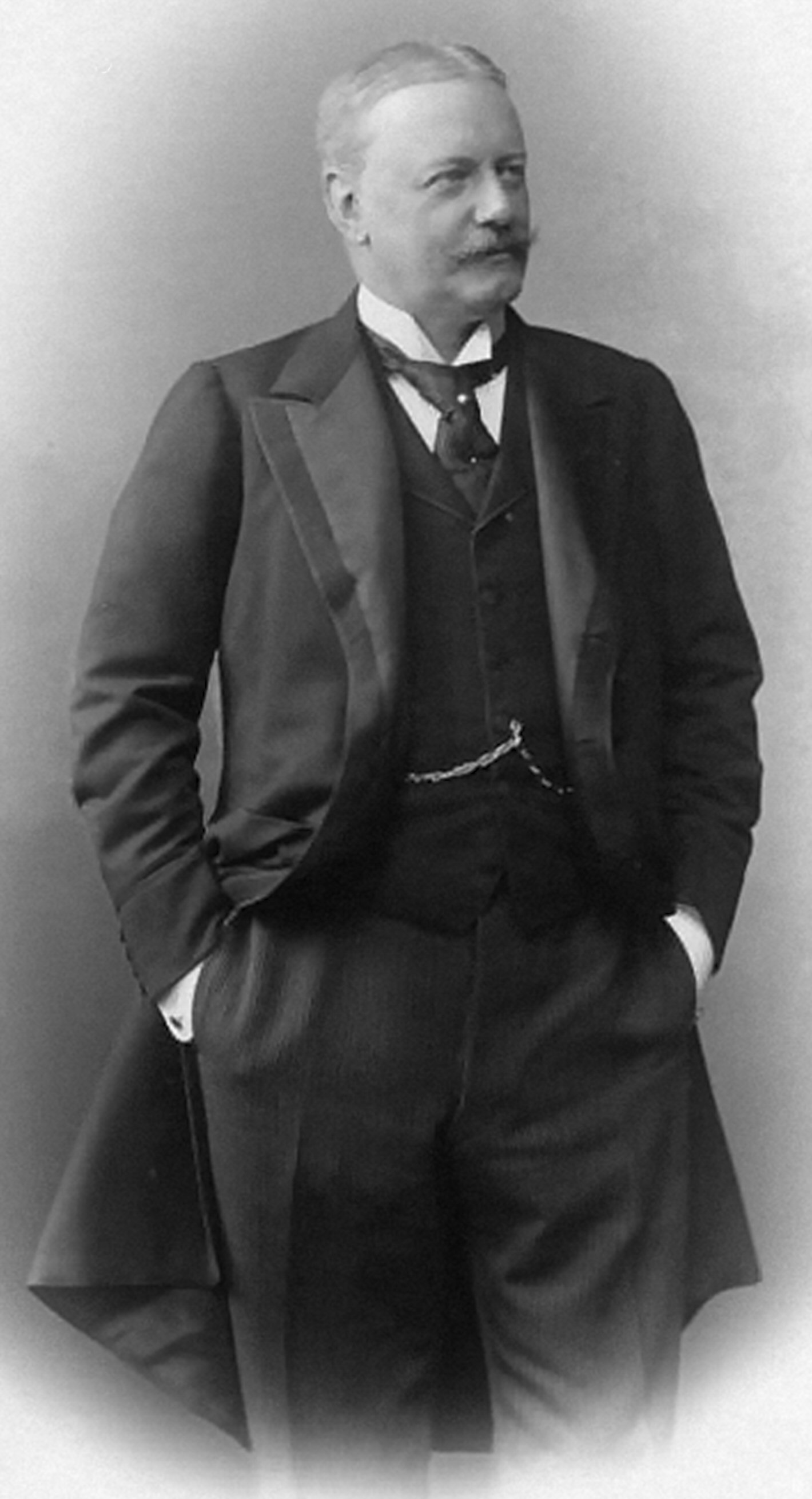
Bernhard von Bülow

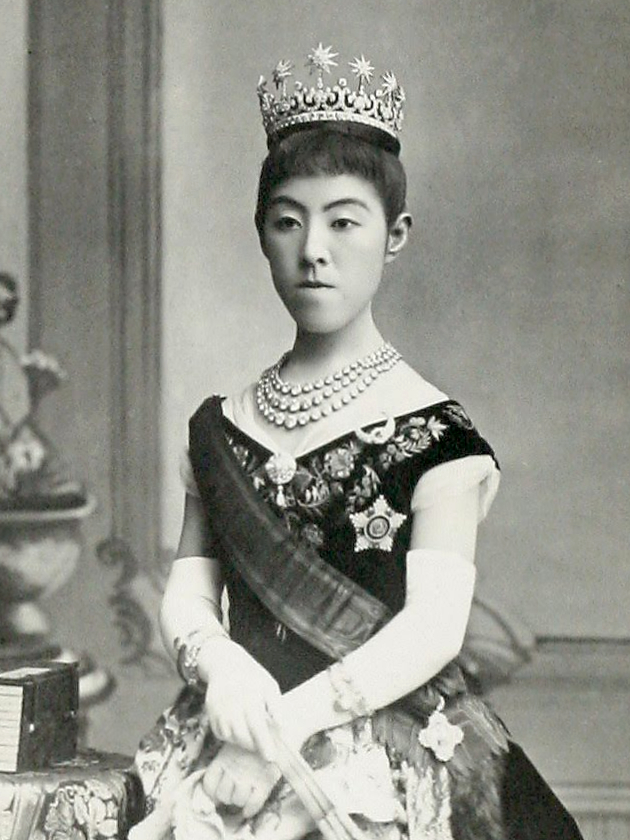
Empress Shōken

- January 8 – Stepan Makarov, Russian admiral (d. 1904)
- January 9 – John Hartley, English tennis player, double winner of Wimbledon (d. 1935)
- January 11 – Ignacio Pinazo Camarlench, Spanish impressionist painter (d. 1916)
- January 14 – James Moore, English winner of the first ever cycle race (d. 1935)
- January 18
  - Aleksander Świętochowski, Polish writer of the Positivist period (d. 1938)
  - Sir Edmund Barton, 1st Prime Minister of Australia (d. 1920)
- January 22 – August Strindberg, Swedish author, playwright, and painter (d. 1912)
- February 13 – Lord Randolph Churchill, British statesman (d. 1895)
- February 18 – Alexander Kielland, Norwegian author (d. 1906)
- February 19 – Giovanni Passannante, Italian anarchist (d. 1910)
- March 6 – Georg Luger, Austrian firearm designer (d. 1923)
- March 7 – Luther Burbank, American biologist, botanist (d. 1926)
- March 19 – Alfred von Tirpitz, German admiral (d. 1930)
- March 24 – Franz S. Exner, Austrian physicist (d. 1926)

=== April–June ===
- April 6
  - Thekla Friedländer, German soprano and social reformer (d. unknown)
  - John William Waterhouse, Italian-born British artist (d. 1917)
- April 20 – Nikolai Nebogatov, Russian admiral (d. 1922)
- April 21 – Oscar Hertwig, German zoologist (d. 1922)
- April 24
  - Emma Whitcomb Babcock, American litterateur and author (d. 1926)
  - Helen Taggart Clark, American journalist and poet (d. 1918)
  - Joseph Gallieni, French general (d. 1916)
- April 25 – Felix Klein, German mathematician (d. 1925)
- April 28 – Augusto Aubry, Italian admiral, politician (d. 1912)
- May 1 – Kamimura Hikonojō, Japanese admiral (d. 1916)
- May 3
  - Bertha Benz, German automotive pioneer (d. 1944)
  - Bernhard von Bülow, 8th Chancellor of Germany (d. 1929)
- May 9 – Empress Shōken, consort of Emperor Meiji of Japan (d. 1914)
- May 19 – John Hubbard, American admiral (d. 1932)
- May 22
  - Louis Perrier, member of the Swiss Federal Council (d. 1913)
  - Sir Aston Webb, British architect (d. 1930)
- May 23 – Károly Khuen-Héderváry, 2-time prime minister of Hungary (d. 1918)
- May 27 – Alzina Stevens, American labor leader, social reformer, and editor (d. 1900)
- June 9 – Michael Ancher, Danish painter (d. 1927)
- June 29 – Pedro Montt, 14th president of Chile (d. 1910)

=== July–September ===
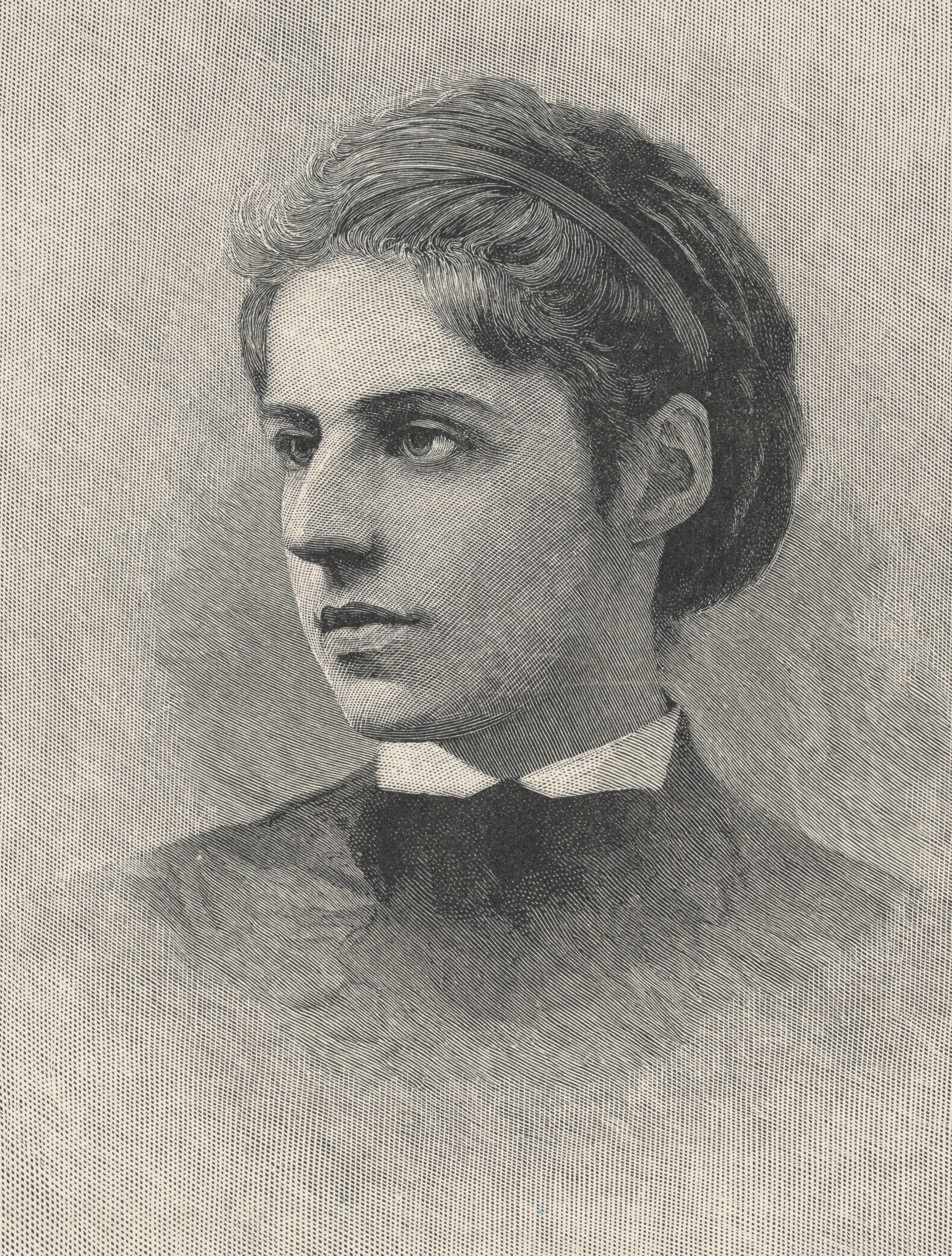
Emma Lazarus

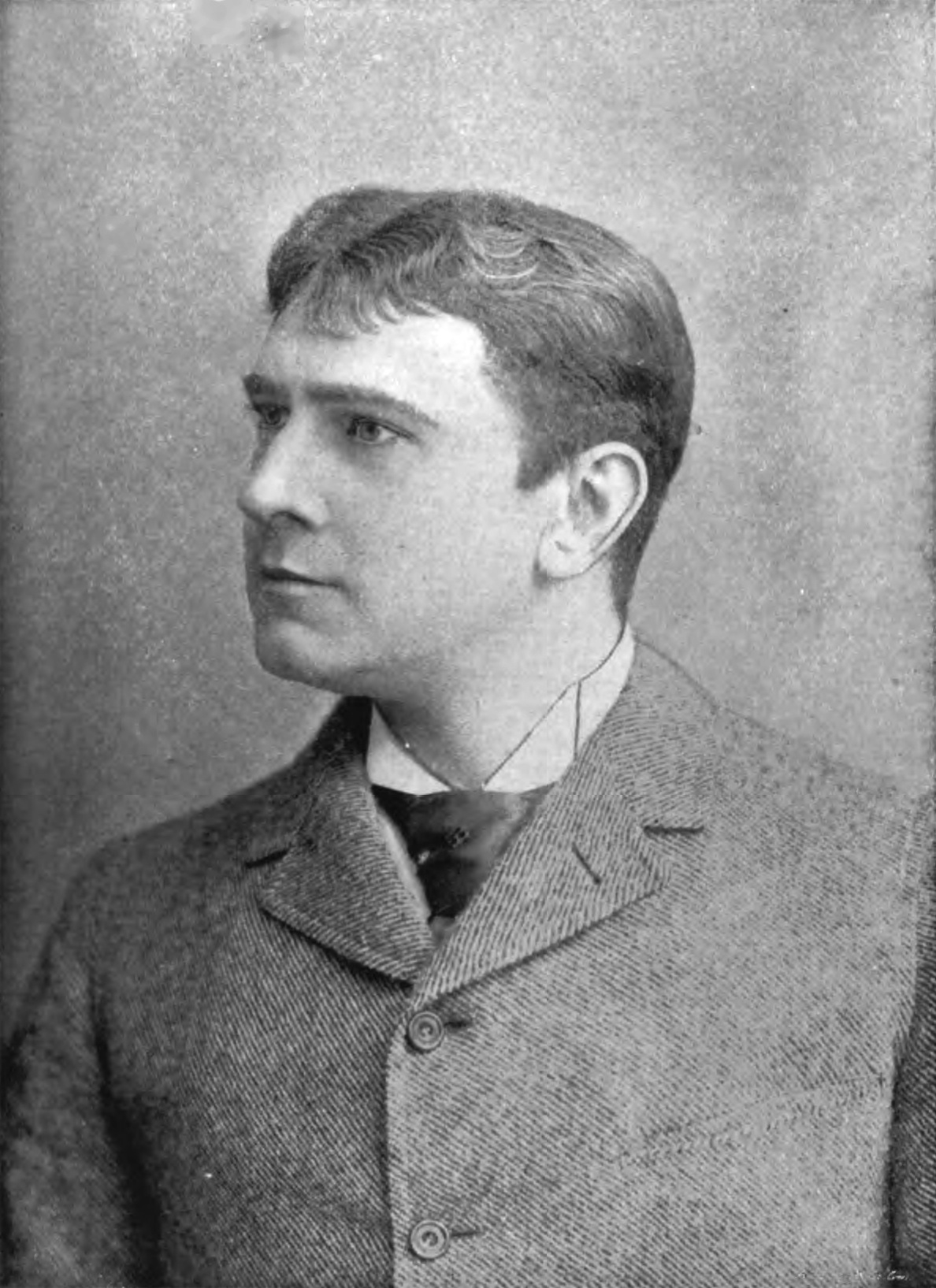
Maurice Barrymore

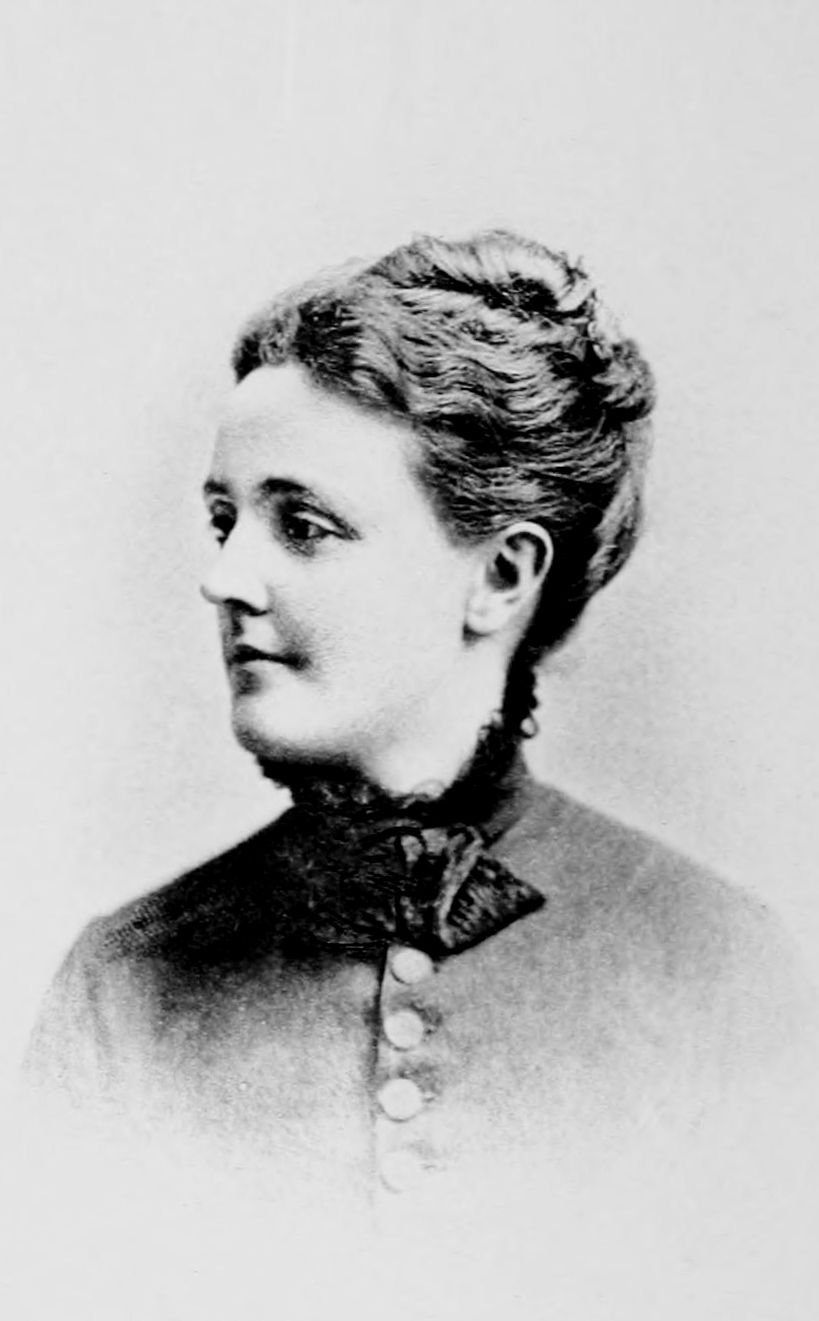
Sarah Orne Jewett

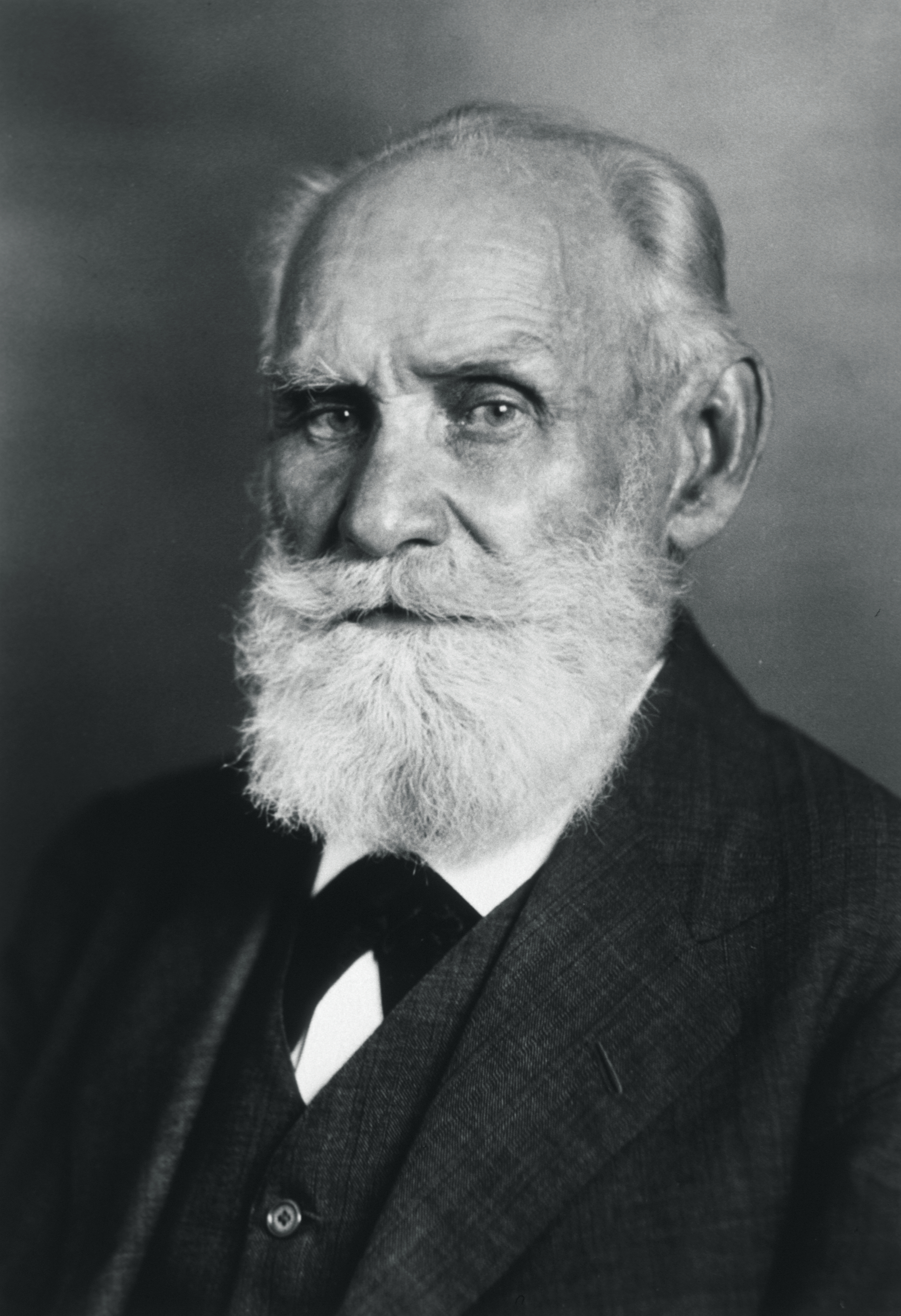
Ivan Pavlov

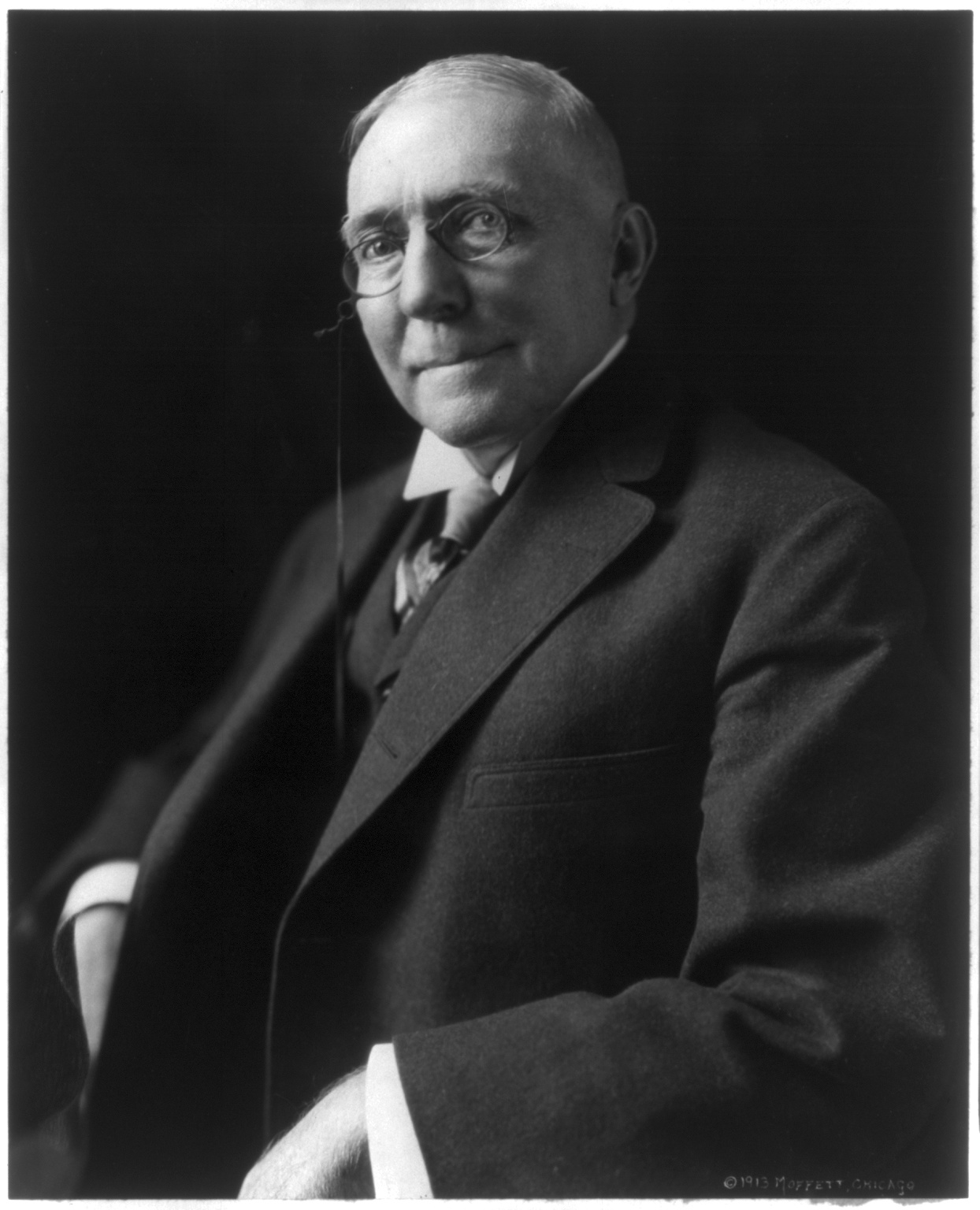
James Whitcomb Riley

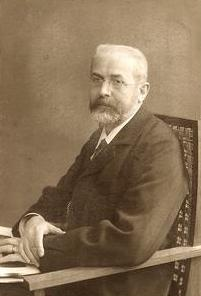
Georg Frobenius

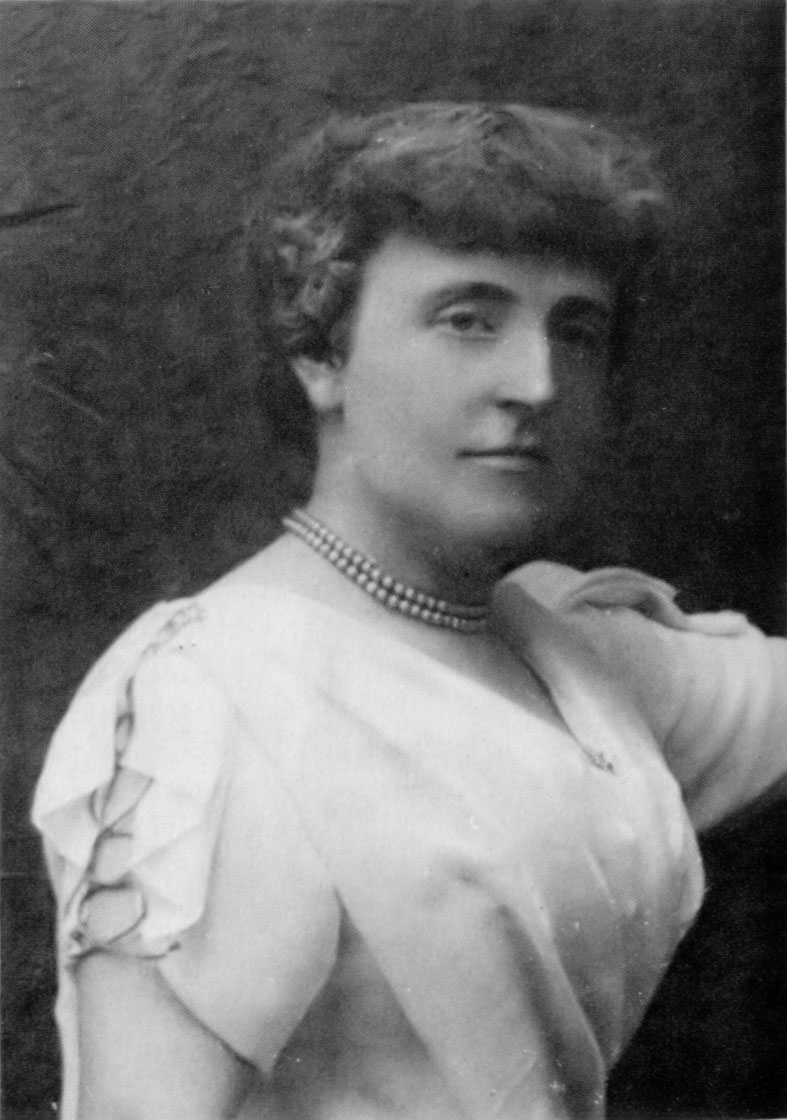
Frances Hodgson Burnett

- July 4
  - Fernand de Langle de Cary, French general (d. 1927)
  - Vladimir Vasilyevich Smirnov, Russian general (d. 1918)
- July 22 – Emma Lazarus, American author and activist (d. 1887)
- July 29
  - Max Nordau, Austrian author, philosopher and Zionist leader (d. 1923)
  - Edward Theodore Compton, English-German painter and mountain climber (d. 1921)
- August 16 – Johan Kjeldahl, Danish chemist, creator of the Kjeldahl method (d. 1900)
- August 17 – Seaton Schroeder, American admiral (d. 1922)
- August 23 – William Ernest Henley, English poet, writer, critic (d. 1903)
- August 28 – Benjamin Godard, French composer (d. 1895)
- September 2 – Emma Curtis Hopkins, American spiritual writer (d. 1925)
- September 3 – Sarah Orne Jewett, American writer (d. 1909)
- September 11 – Sir Edmund Poë, British admiral (d. 1921)
- September 12 – Alexander von Krobatin, Austro-Hungarian field marshal and politician (d. 1933)
- September 14 – Ivan Pavlov, Russian physiologist, recipient of the Nobel Prize in Physiology or Medicine (d. 1936)
- September 18 – Martha Place, American murderer, first woman executed in the electric chair (d. 1899)
- September 21 – Maurice Barrymore, British-American stage actor, playwright (d. 1905)
- September 23 – Hugo von Seeliger, German astronomer (d. 1924)

=== October–December ===
- October 7 – James Whitcomb Riley, American poet and author (d. 1916)
- October 10 – Mary Baker McQuesten, Canadian letter writer and missionary (d. 1934)
- October 26 – Ferdinand Georg Frobenius, German mathematician (d. 1917)
- October 28 – Oskar Enkvist, Russian admiral (d. 1912)
- October 31 – Marie Louise Andrews, American author and editor (d. 1891)
- November 24 – Frances Hodgson Burnett, English-American playwright, author (d. 1924)
- November 29 – Sir Ambrose Fleming, English electrical engineer, inventor (d. 1945)
- December 5 – Eduard Seler, Prussian scholar, Mesoamericanist (d. 1922)
- December 6 – August von Mackensen, German field marshal (d. 1945)
- December 7 – Saionji Kinmochi, Japanese prince and prime minister (d. 1940)
- December 12 – William Kissam Vanderbilt, American railway magnate (d. 1920)
- December 18 – Laura M. Johns, American suffragist, journalist (d. 1935)
- December 19 – Henry Clay Frick, American industrialist, art collector (d. 1919)
- December 20
  - John W. Kern, American politician (d. 1917)
  - Raymond P. Rodgers, American admiral (d. 1925)
- December 25 – Nogi Maresuke, Japanese general (d. 1912)

=== Date unknown ===
- Muhammad Abduh, Islamic reformer (d. 1905)
- Elisabeth Cavazza, American author, journalist, and music critic (d. 1926)
- Harriet Abbott Lincoln Coolidge, American philanthropist, author and reformer (d. 1902)
- Ellen Eglin, American inventor
- Pavlos Karolidis, Greek historian (d. 1930)
- Aleksandr Loran, Russian inventor (d. 1911)
- Euphemia Wilson Pitblado, American activist, social reformer, and writer (d. 1928)

== Deaths ==
=== January–June ===
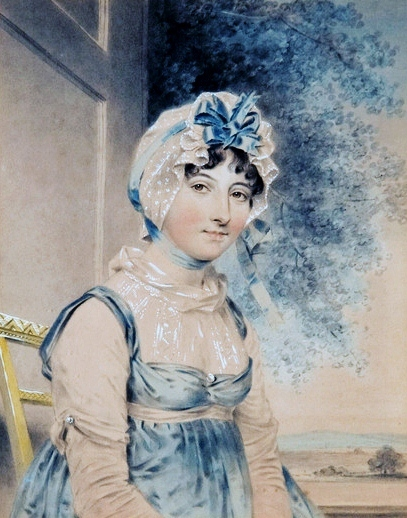
Maria Edgeworth

- January 14 – Pierre Roch Jurien de La Gravière, French admiral (b. 1772)
- January 18 – Panoutsos Notaras, Greek politician (b. 1752)
- January 30 – Jonathan Alder, American settler (b. 1773)
- February 8 – France Prešeren, Slovenian poet (b. 1800)
- February 28 – Regina von Siebold, German physician, obstetrician (b. 1771)
- March 14 – King Willem II of the Netherlands (b. 1792)
- March 15 – Giuseppe Caspar Mezzofanti, Italian Catholic cardinal, linguist (b. 1774)
- March 18 – Antonin Moine, French sculptor (b. 1796)
- March 20 – James Justinian Morier, British diplomat, author (b. 1780)
- March 24 – Johann Wolfgang Döbereiner, German chemist (b. 1780)
- April 5 – Mary Short queen consort of Awadh (b. 1802)
- April 8 – Christine Marie von Cappelen, Norwegian botanist (b. 1766)
- April 11 – Pedro Ignacio de Castro Barros, Argentine statesman, priest (b. 1777)
- May 10 – Hokusai, Japanese Ukiyo-e Artist (b. 1760)
- May 11
  - Juliette Récamier, French socialite (b. 1777)
  - Otto Nicolai, German composer, conductor (b. 1810)
- May 22 – Maria Edgeworth, Irish novelist (b. 1767)
- May 25 – Benjamin D'Urban, British general, colonial administrator (b. 1777)
- May 28 – Anne Brontë, English author (b. 1820)
- May 31 – Leonard du Bus de Gisignies, Governor-General of the Dutch East Indies (b. 1780)
- June 10 – Thomas Robert Bugeaud, Marshal of France, duke of Isly (b. 1784)
- June 15 – James Knox Polk, 53, 11th president of the United States (b. 1795)

=== July–December ===
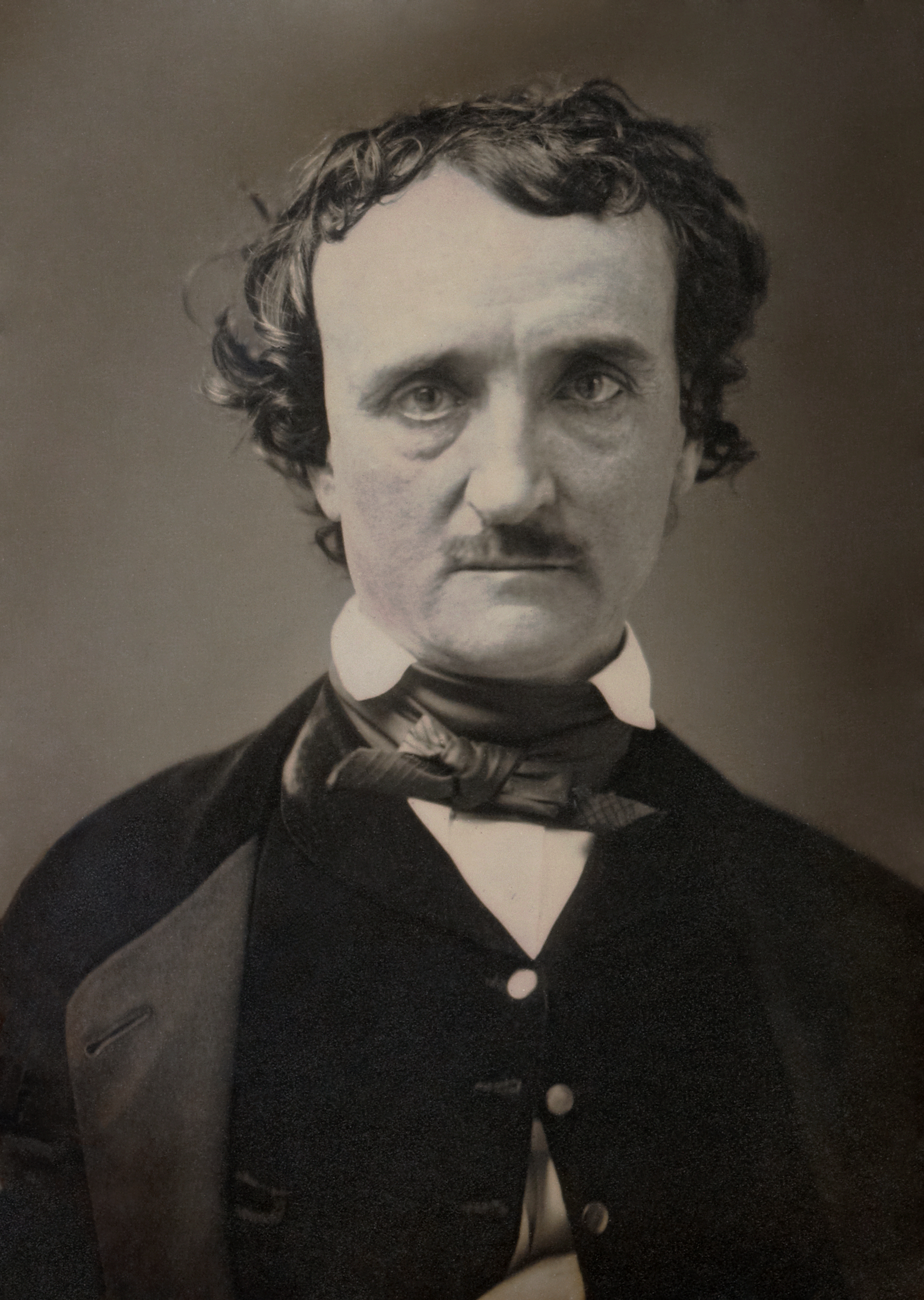
Edgar Allan Poe

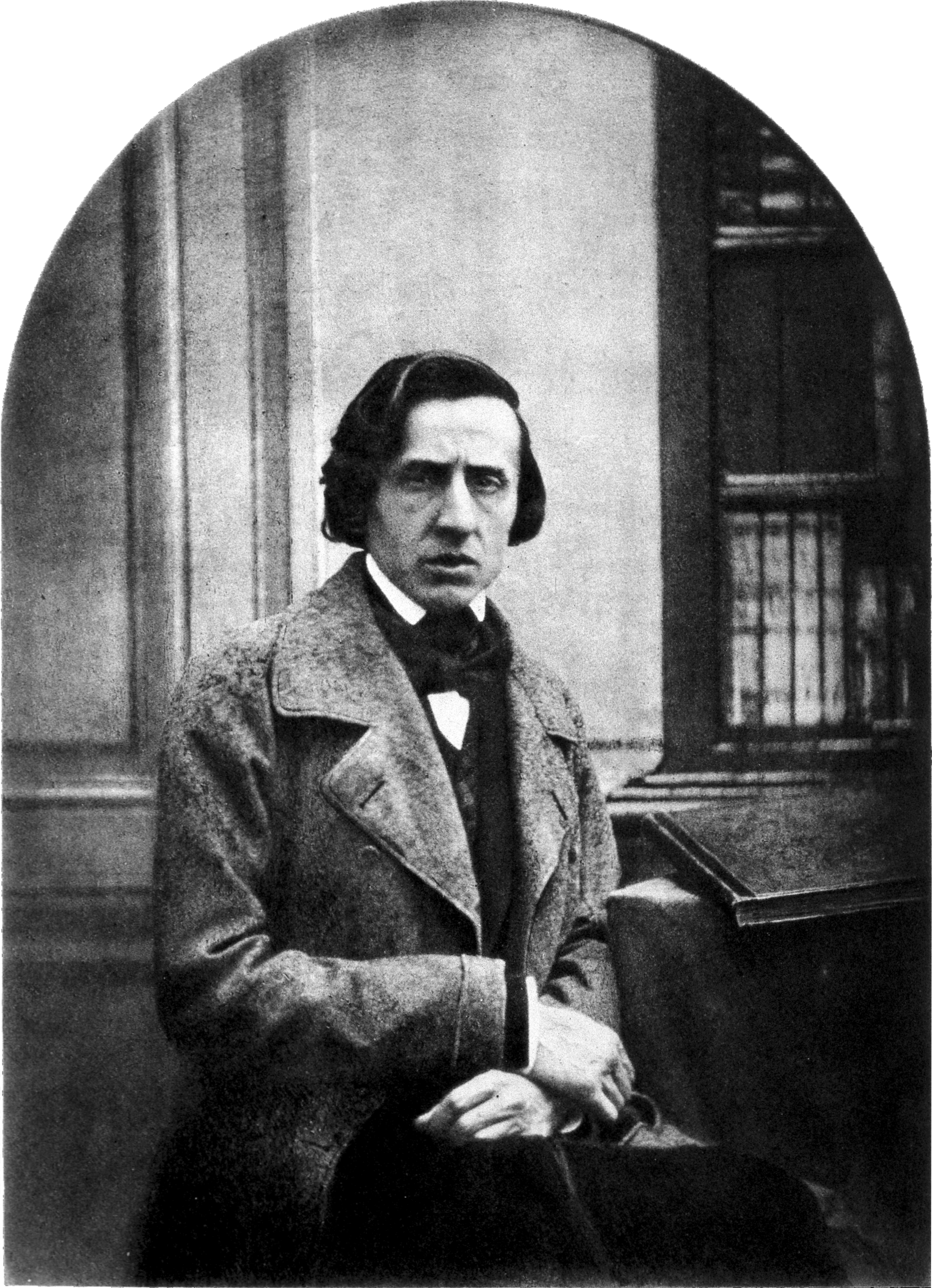
Frédéric Chopin

- July 12 – Dolley Madison, 81, First Lady of the United States (b. 1768)
- July 28 – King Charles Albert of Sardinia (b. 1798)
- July 31 – Sándor Petőfi, Hungarian poet (b. 1823)
- August 1 – José de Urrea, Mexican General (b. 1797)
- August 2 – Muhammad Ali of Egypt (b. 1769)
- August 23 – Edward Hicks American folk artist (b. 1780)
- September 4 – Friedrich Laun, German novelist (b. 1770)
- September 6 – Andreas Joseph Hofmann, German philosopher and revolutionary (b. 1752)
- September 7 – Mariano Paredes, Mexican President and General
- September 23 – Mary Elizabeth Lee, American writer (b. 1813)
- September 25 – Johann Strauss, Senior, Austrian composer (b. 1804)
- October 6 – Lajos Batthyány, Hungarian statesman (executed) (b. 1807)
- October 7 – Edgar Allan Poe, American writer (b. 1809)
- October 17 – Frédéric Chopin, Polish-French musician, composer (b. 1810)
- October 22 – William Miller, American Baptist preacher, leader of the Second Advent Movement (b. 1782)
- December 2 – Adelaide of Saxe-Meiningen, queen of William IV of the United Kingdom (b. 1792)
- December 20 – Kyai Maja, Javanese ulama and commander of Java War (b. 1792)

=== Date unknown ===
- Cynthia Taggart, American poet (b. 1801)
- Mupitsukupʉ (Old Owl), Comanche Civil Chief
