= Heinrich Hentzi =

Austro-Hungarian general (1785–1849)

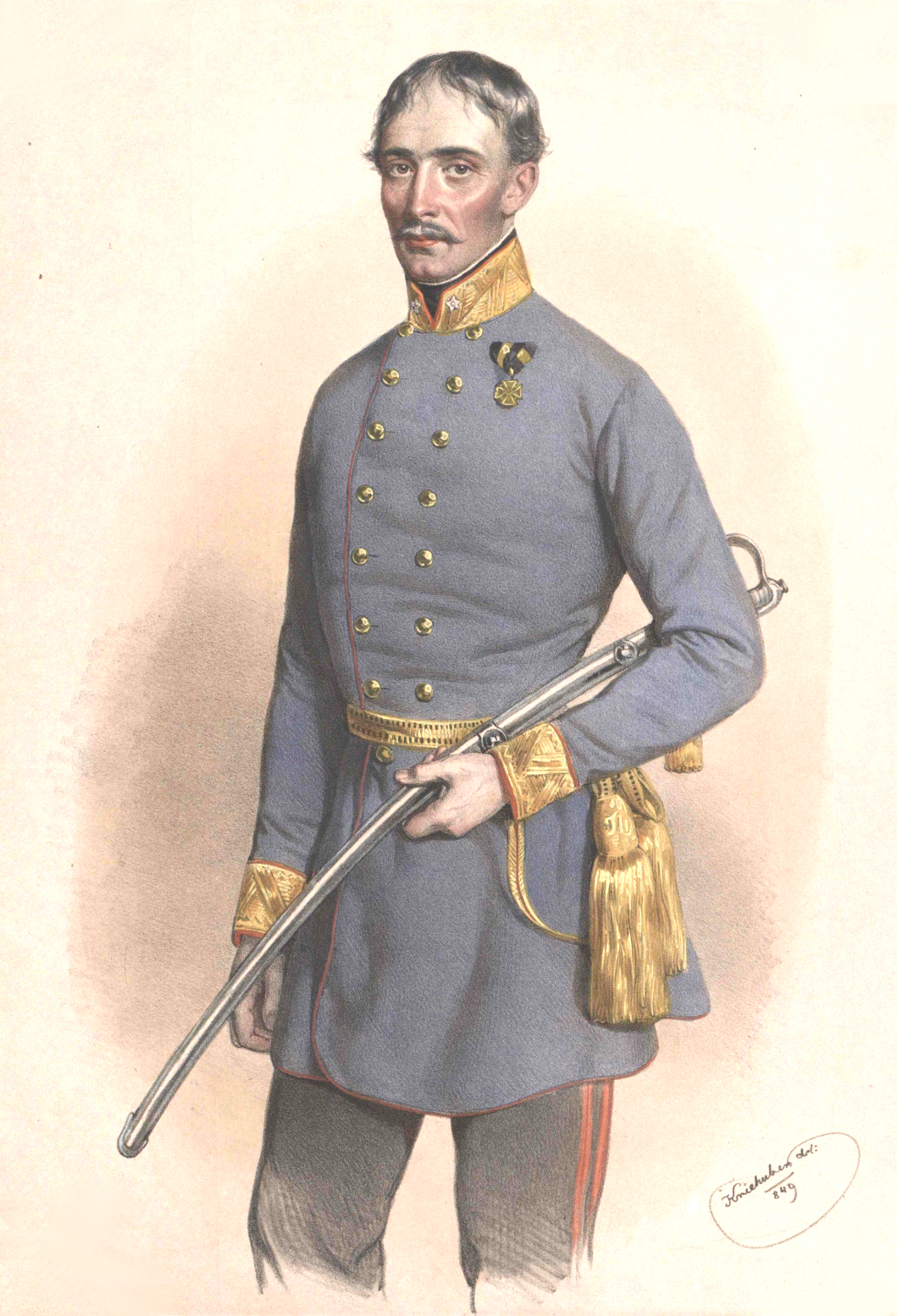
Heinrich Hentzi (lithograph by Josef Kriehuber, 1849)

Heinrich Hentzi von Arthurm (24 October 1785 – 21 May 1849) was a Hungarian general in the army of the Austrian Empire. He made a name for himself as the military officer who refused to defect to the Hungarian rebels during the Battle of Buda in 1849, defending Buda city and castle on behalf of the Austrian Habsburgs.

Born in Debrecen, Hentzi's military career reached a climax in April, 1849 when, he mounted a defense on the Buda side of the Danube river, headquartered in the Buda Castle after the Austrian forces had evacuated Pest. Holding out against the Hungarian siege for over a month, Hentzi refused to capitulate. When general Artúr Görgey appealed to Hentzi's Magyar ancestry in an attempt to secure his surrender, Hentzi replied that while he had indeed been born in the Kingdom of Hungary, he remained loyal to the Kaiser. Hentzi was killed when the Hungarian forces stormed Buda and its castle in late May, 1849.

== Legacy ==
Hentzi's refusal to switch sides and his lengthy defense of Buda are credited with preventing a Hungarian counteroffensive against Austria in the spring and summer of 1849.

In Hungary he is remembered for giving the order for the bombardment of the city of Pest during which many civilian buildings were destroyed. That way his intention was to discourage the Hungarian troops from the siege and to terrorize the civilian population. During this time, the city of Pest had no military significance, and general Görgey promised not to attack the Buda castle from the side of Pest, however, in case Pest should come under artillery fire from the side of Buda, he would show no mercy.

A hero to the Habsburg loyalists, Hentzi was honored with a statue in Budapest, which became a source of tensions in the city in 1886. When the city's military commander, General major Ludwig Janski decorated the Hentzi sculpture, it sparked a public outcry and riots broke out as well as fights and duels took place between Austrian military officers and Hungarians. The disruption became so severe that Crown Prince Rudolf advocated an armed intervention. No such measure was taken but the government in Vienna refused to punish the officers involved. General Janski was transferred to a divisional command elsewhere.

The statue controversy was minimized in 1899 when, in an effort to appease the Hungarian sentiment, the Hentzi sculpture was removed from its prominent place in Saint George Square and placed inside the courtyard of the cadet school in Budapest.

== See also ==
- Hungarian Revolution of 1848

== Bibliography ==
- Rothenberg, Gunther E. (1976). The Army of Francis Joseph. Purde University Press. ISBN 0-911198-41-5. OCLC 1158833206.
