= Fayetteville and Western Plank Road =

Plank road in North Carolina, USA

Fayetteville and Western Plank Road Historical Marker, Bethania, NC

The Fayetteville and Western Plank Road was a 129 mi (208 km) plank road from Fayetteville, NC to the Moravian settlement at Bethania, NC. The road was constructed from 1851-1852 using funds raised by boosters and accompanying funds provided by the state of North Carolina.

There were 80 such projects for internal transportation authorized by North Carolina by 1860, and this was the only one that reached its goals. Originally planned to go from Fayetteville to Salisbury, North Carolina, the community in Salisbury was lukewarm to the plank road because they planned to lure a railroad to their community. Instead, the members of the Moravian Church in Salem, North Carolina planned for the terminus in their town, and they raised sufficient stock investments to make this possible. The route was changed so that it went from Fayetteville to Carthage, North Carolina, Ashboro, North Carolina and then to High Point, North Carolina. The plank road was stopped just outside the town limits because the Moravians did not want the sounds of wagons on the road to disturb their church services. The plank road was then continued north of town to Winston, North Carolina, and then west to Bethania, North Carolina, as its terminus. Travel from Salem to Fayetteville by two horses and a wagon cost about $2.25, and took four days. Travel by the much faster Stagecoach cost $9.00 one way and took about 18 hours.

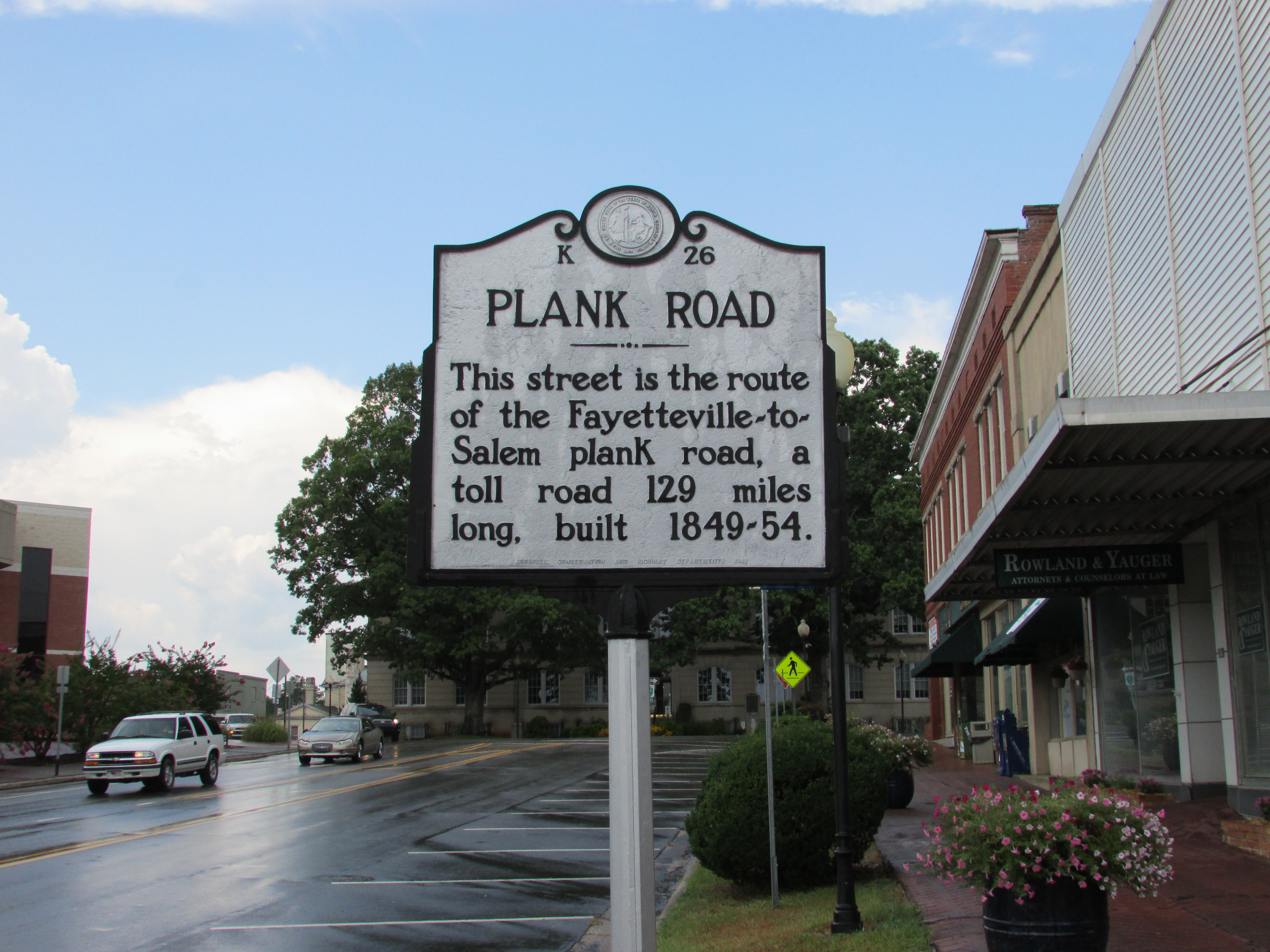
Plank Road historical marker commemorating the plank road that once ran from Fayetteville to Salem, North Carolina, spanning 129 miles. On highway 27 in Carthage, North Carolina.

Because Fayetteville is at the head of the navigable waters of the Cape Fear River, it was planned to make Fayetterville a center for transportation for the eastern part of the state. Other projects included the Fayetteville and Raleigh Plank Road, Fayetteville and Center Plank Road (to Center, now re-named Norwood, North Carolina, the Fayetteville and Northern Plank Road, and the Fayetteville and Warsaw Plank Road, which would meet up with the Wilmington and Weldon Railroad. The cost of the road construction was about $1,300.00 per mile.

Harnett County, North Carolina, was along the route. The only toll house in the county was at Round Top, North Carolina. The first toll keeper was Malcolm Clark, and his salary was $100.00 per year.

During the mid-1850s, business on the toll-based road provided as much as $27,419.77 income in one year, but by the turn of the decade income no longer met maintenance costs and the road was unprofitable. However, the 129 mile long plank road opened up central North Carolina rural areas to larger markets and economic opportunities. But during the Civil War, the roads were not maintained and fell apart. The roadbeds continued to be used, even with a rough top, and the roadbeds were the basis for later transportation development.

== Bibliography ==
- Fayetteville and Western Plank Road Company. Annual Report of the President and Directors Made to the Stockholders at the Annual Meeting. Fayetteville [N.C.]: The Co, 1850.
- Fayetteville and Western Plank Road Company. Charter and Bye-Laws, of the Fayetteville & Western Plank Road Company, Incorporated by the General Assembly of North Carolina, 1848-9. Fayetteville [N.C.]: E.J. Hale, 1849. The text of the Charter and by-laws are available online at: https://books.google.com/books?id=2F_PLxx_9csC&dq=%22Fayetteville+and+Western+Plank+Road%22&pg=PA1
- Fayetteville and Western Plank Road Company. Proceedings of the ... Annual Meeting of the Fayetteville and Western Plank Road Company. Fayetteville, N.C.: Printed by Edward J. Hale, 1900.
- Fayetteville and Western Plank Road Company. Fourth Annual Report. Fayetteville: Edward J. Hale & Son, 1853. Report of the president and directors of the F. and W. plank road company, made to the stockholders at the annual meeting, April 14th and 15th, 1853.
- Fayetteville and Western Plank Road Company. The Fifth Annual Report of the President and Directors of the Fayetteville and Western Plank Road Company to the Stockholders, April 13, 1854. Raleigh [N.C.]: W.W. Holden, Printer to the State, 1855.
- Fayetteville and Western Plank Road Company. Report of the President and Directors of the Fayetteville and Western Plank-Road Company, to April 1st., 1856. [Raleigh]: Holden & Wilson, 1856.
- Fayetteville and Western Plank Road Company. Report of the Fayetteville and Western Plank Road Company. 1850.
- Fayetteville and Western Plank Road Company. Second and Third Annual Reports of the President and Directors of the F. and W. Plank Road Company,: Made to the Stockholders at the Annual Meetings, April 10, 1851, and April 8, 1852. Fayetteville, [N.C.]: Printed by Edward J. Hale & Son, 1852.
- Fayetteville and Western Plank Road Company, and E. J. Hale. Proceedings of the Second Annual Meeting of the Fayetteville and Western Plank Road Company,: Held in Fayetteville, N.C., on Thursday and Friday, the 11th and 12th of April 1850; to Which Are Added the Report of the President, and the Amended Bye-Laws of the Company. Fayetteville, [N.C.]: Printed by Edward J. Hale, 1850.
- North Carolina. To the Honorable, the General Assembly of the State of North Carolina. 1858.
- North Carolina, and Seaton Gales. A Bill to Incorporate the Fayetteville and Western Plank Road Company. 1848.
- United States. Plank Road Revisited. [Fort Bragg, N.C.]: [1st Psychological Operations Battalion], 1971. [produced by the 2d Psychological Operations Group, Fort Bragg, N.C. Illus., layouts and designs created by Graphics Department of the 1st PSYOP Bn.].
