= Elisabeth Cavazza =

American journalist

- Born: Elisabeth Stuart Jones; 1849; Portland, Maine, U.S.
- Died: July 14, 1926 (aged 76–77); Portland, Maine
- Occupations: author, journalist, music critic
- Spouse(s): Nino Cavazza (m. 1885); Stanley T. Pullen (m. 1894)
- Writing career
- Pen name: E. Cavazza; Elisabeth Pullen
- Language: English

Elisabeth Cavazza (née, Jones; after first marriage, Cavazza, after second marriage, Pullen; 1849 – July 14, 1926) was an American author, journalist, and music critic. She was also taught journalism by Stanley Pullen, then the owner and chief editor of the Portland Press, for whose columns she wrote unsigned verse, sketches and book reviews, acting also as musical critic. A parody in the manner of Algernon Charles Swinburne's Atalanta, "Algernon in London" deceived some leading members of the Century Club of New York City, from whom she received a card of admission to that club, sent on the supposition that the drama was the work of a man. A second parody, in which Robert Browning figured was not only forgiven by the poet, but also rewarded by a letter. Married for a year before she was widowed, Cavazza resumed writing, becoming known to readers of magazines as "E. Cavazza", and published a volume of stories of Calabrian peasant life, entitled Don Finimondone. She was editor of the Italian department of the Transatlantic, and on the editorial staff of the Boston Literary World, also contributing to many periodicals. After a second marriage in 1894, she signed her writings as Elisabeth Pullen. Cavazza was the author of The Man from Aidone, Rocco and Sidora, and Mr. Whitman, as well as translations from the Italian and the French. Her poetical tragedies, Algernon in London and Algernon the Footstool-Bearer, published in the Portland Transcript, attracted wide attention in the United States and England.

== Early years and education ==
Elisabeth Stuart Jones was born in Portland, Maine, 1849. She was the daughter of Charles (1801–1859) and Anna T. (Davies) Jones. Charles came from a seagoing family who were traders in the Mediterranean Sea. He was a leading man in Portland in his day, and was largely instrumental in the welfare and upbuilding of that city. He served as president of the Gas Company and managing director of the Portland Company, of which concerns he was also the practical founder and organizer. He died when his daughter was very young.

Accustomed from childhood to speak both the English and Italian languages, enacting dramas with her dolls, intensely interested in Shakespeare's fairies, the demons of "Dante's Inferno" and stories of the Greek gods and heroes—her early years were not like those of a typical child of New England. She received a thorough musical education in Maine, which included singing, the pianoforte, harmony and counterpoint, as well as musical theory.

As a young girl, she was much interested in musical matters, and received a fine musical education, but her interest soon turned more strictly to literature.

== Career ==
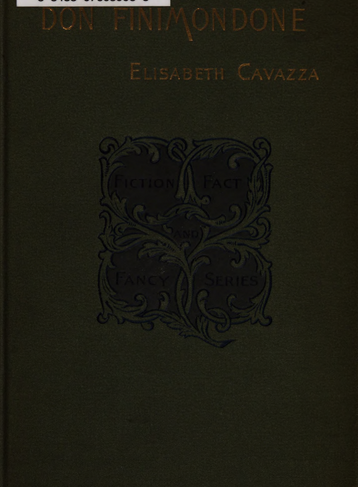
Don Finimondone: Calabrian Sketches (1892)

She began writing for the Portland papers, and was so successful in this as to be encouraged to more ambitious efforts. She had for several years been a regular reviewer and contributor to the Boston Literary World. Professor William Milligan Sloane, editor of the New Princeton Review, was the first to accept a story by Cavazza for a magazine. This story was called "A Calabrian Penelope", and those who read it were struck, not only by the literary ability displayed, but by the novelty and freshness of the subject, namely: the life of Calabrian peasants in Italy. Some little time before this story appeared, Cavazza came into some prominence on account of two comic tragedies contributed to the Portland Press and dealing with eccentric episodes in the poet Swinburne's life.

A review of Edmund Clarence Stedman's "Victorian Poets" won from the eminent critic a flattering letter in regard to the young journalist. She had an unwillingness to be known to write, and, so well was the mystery maintained, that one day after the publication of her parody upon Algernon Charles Swinburne's Atalanta in Calydon, there arrived at the Press office a letter enclosing a card of invitation to the Century Club, which bore the endorsement of Stedman, Bayard Taylor, Richard Henry Stoddard, and August Rodney Macdonough, who assumed the author of the parody to be a man. This parody was quoted by the London Saturday Review as the best sample of this kind of literature on this side of the Atlantic Ocean.

A second pseudo-Greek drama Algernon, the Foot-Stool Bearer, in which Swinburne and Robert Browning were parodied, was rewarded by a charming letter from Mr. Browning. Just before Bayard Taylor sailed for Germany to assume the post of Minister at Berlin, he came to Portland on purpose to see the young woman and speak encouragingly to her concerning her literary future. Later, she was honored by the warm friendship of John Greenleaf Whittier. Prof. Henry Wadsworth Longfellow thanked her in a letter for a long poem published in the Press on occasion of his 75 birthday; and when, in September 1888, a statue of the poet was unveiled in his native city, Cavazza was invited to write a poem, which was read upon the occasion. Besides her work in fiction and for the Literary World, she wrote considerably on contemporary Italian literature for the Atlantic Monthly, and was also a member of the staff of the New World, Nicholas Paine Oilman's review. Cavazza was an intimate friend of Whittier and of those of his relatives who resided in Portland, and attributed much of her encouragement to continue as a writer to their friendly words. Some of her short stories were issued as Don Finimondone: Italian Sketches, in 1892.

== Personal life ==
Accustomed to speaking Italian and English, in February 1885, she married Nino Cavazza, of Modena, Italy. He was a son of Cavaliere Alessandro Cavazza, professor of sculpture in the Royal Academy of Modena. His death occurred within a year from their marriage; but Mrs. Cavazza's early interest in all that relates to Italian life and manners was undoubtedly increased by her marriage. After she was widowed, Cavazza turned to literary writing as a profession, writing verse and prose for Portland journals, and some of the leading magazines and juvenile periodicals. She married Stanley T. Pullen, a journalist and financier of Portland, on September 8, 1894.

Cavazza died July 14, 1926, at the Lafayette Hotel, Portland, Maine, where she had made her home for a number of years.
