= Euphemia Wilson Pitblado =

Scottish-American women's activist and social reformer (1849–1928)

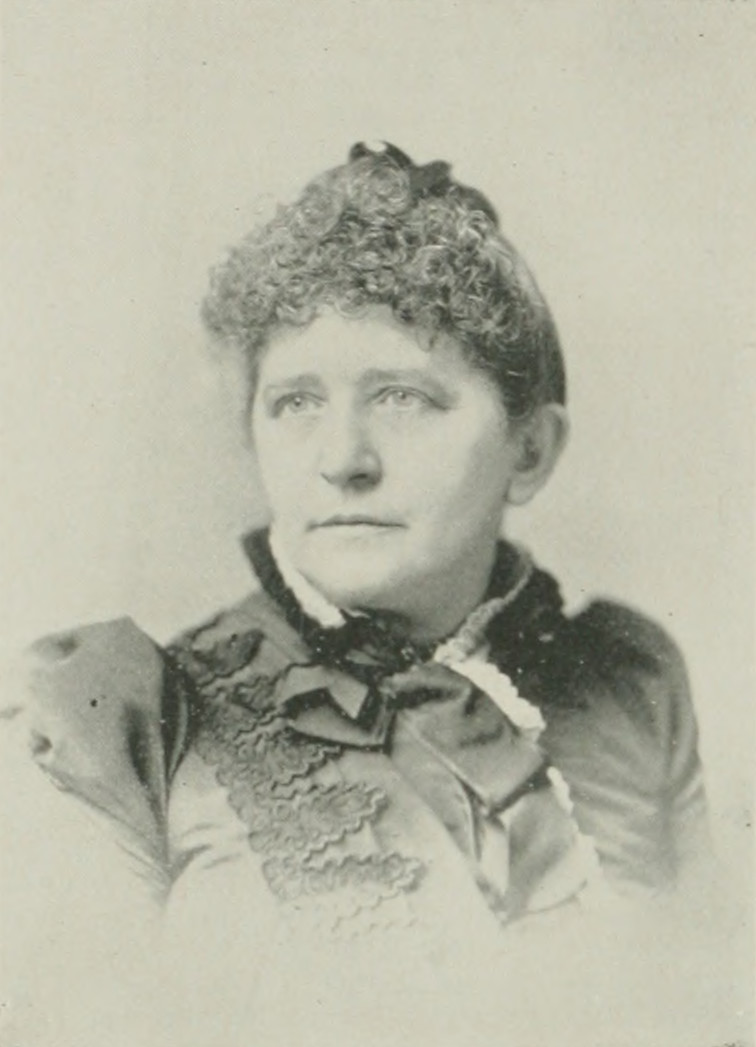
- Photo in A Woman of the Century
- Born: Euphemia Wilson; 1849; Edinburgh, Scotland
- Died: June 17, 1928 (aged 78-79)
- Resting place: Cedar Hill Cemetery, Hartford, Connecticut, U.S.
- Other name: Effie
- Education: Winnington Hall
- Occupations: activist; social reformer; writer
- Spouse: Charles Bruce Pitblado (m. 1866)
- Children: 5
- Writing career
- Language: English
- Subjects: temperance; suffrage; missions; education; religion

Euphemia Wilson Pitblado (née, Wilson; 1849 – June 17, 1928) was a Scottish-born American women's activist, social reformer, and writer. She traveled in Europe, Canada, and in the United States, crossing the Atlantic five times. Pitblado was a delegate to the National Woman Suffrage Association Convention in Washington, D.C., the New England Woman's Suffrage Association Conventions, the National Woman's Christian Temperance Union (WCTU) Conventions in New York City, Denver, and Chicago, and to the annual Woman's Foreign Missionary Conventions in Boston and Lowell, Massachusetts. Her principal literary works were addresses upon temperance, suffrage, missions, education, and religion.

== Early life and education ==
Euphemia (nickname, "Effie") Wilson was born in Edinburgh, Scotland in 1849. Her father, Hugh Wilson, was a lawyer and an elder in Dr. Robert Smith Candlish's Presbyterian church. Hugh was of the same family as Prof. John Wilson, better known by his pseudonym,"Christopher North". Her mother, Euphemia Gibb Wilson, was a near relative of Dr. Thomas Dick, the Christian philosopher and astronomer.

Pitblado received her education in Edinburgh and afterwards in Winnington Hall, near Chester, England. In that college, all the students were required to study French and converse in it during school hours, that they might speak it fluently. She received there a thorough musical and vocal education and the opportunity of hearing classical music. Pitblado was a student in the Chautauqua school for several years. She also studied drawing and painting, but did not have much time for developing that talent.

== Career ==
Her home in Edinburgh having been broken up after the death of her father, Pitblado came to the U.S. to live with her oldest sister, the wife of a Presbyterian minister. Here, in 1866, she married Rev. Charles Bruce Pitblado, D.D., of the Methodist Episcopal Church. She had previously become a member of that church and was greatly interested in its services, especially those in which women might speak, having been deprived of that privilege in the Presbyterian Church, the church of her father. She engaged with her husband in evangelistic work, and has led his meetings and supplied his pulpit. She helped in the inquiry meetings of the Boston Tabernacle, in response to a call from Rev. Dwight L. Moody for such Christian workers.

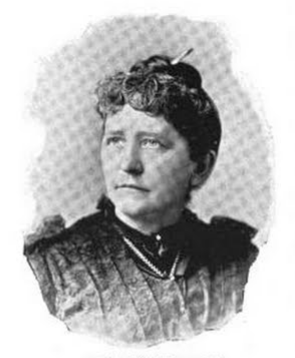
Euphemia Wilson Pitblado

When the Women's Crusade was inaugurated, she was ready to work with the WCTU, and was an active member ever since of that organization. While her husband was pastor of a church in Manchester, New Hampshire, a great temperance wave passed through the State of New Hampshire, and Mrs. Pitblado was invited to give temperance addresses in many towns and villages, and she organized the WCTU of Nashua, New Hampshire, with about sixty members. She always believed in the right of a woman with a man to equal opportunities for education and work, and to that end she advocated the advancement of women in every area of life. In their behalf, she spoke before conventions of the WCTU, woman's suffrage associations, woman's foreign missionary societies, and before the legislature in the capitol in Hartford, Connecticut, and she was sent a delegate to the annual WCTU convention in New York, the annual Woman's Foreign Missionary Society in Boston and Lowell, Massachusetts, and to the National Woman Suffrage Association in Washington, D.C.

She contributed articles from time to time to several papers on suffrage, temperance, missions, education, and religion. She also gave addresses before clubs and societies. She was a member of the executive committee of the New England Woman Suffrage Association and an honorary member of the Campello, Massachusetts League, of which she was the first president. She was also the president of the Milford, Connecticut branch of the WCTU. Pitblado was a member of the National American Woman Suffrage Association. She was a charter member of the Woman's Educational and Industrial Union of Providence, Rhode Island, where her husband was at one time stationed.

== Personal life ==
She had two daughter and three sons, two of whom survived her, Guthrie, a clergyman of the Protestant Episcopal Church in Toledo, Ohio, and Colin B. of Hartford, Connecticut.

In the U.S., Pitblado often participated in concerts, and at one time, was leader of a choir. In religions faith, she was a Methodist.

Euphemia Wilson Pitblado died June 17, 1928, and was buried at Cedar Hill Cemetery, Hartford.
