= Augusto Aubry =

Italian general (1849–1912)

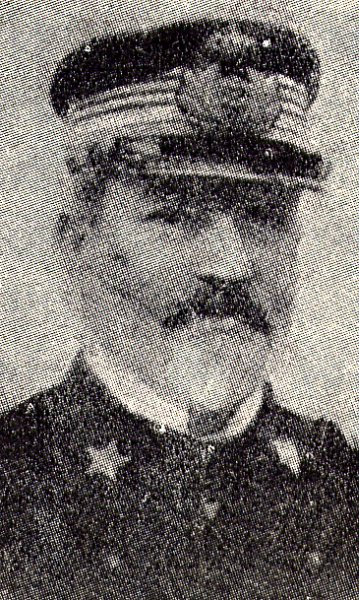
Augusto Aubry

Augusto Aubry (28 April 1849 – 4 March 1912) was an Italian naval officer and politician. Part of the naval fortifications at Taranto were later named after him.

== Life ==
Entering the Italian Navy in 1866, he took part in the Battle of Lissa and commanded the protected cruiser Dogali on a voyage to Rio de Janeiro during the Brazilian military insurrection of September 1893. Between 1896 and 1897 he commanded the cruiser Savoia.

He was deputy for the colleges of Castellammare di Stabia and Naples (XXII and XXIII legislatures) and under-secretary of state for the navy (December 1903 to December 1905).

At the start of the Italo-Turkish War, on 27 September 1911, with the rank of vice admiral, he commanded the 1st Squadron, the 1st Division of the 1st Squadron and the whole Italian naval force in that theatre. As commander of 1st Squadron he guided the force which occupied the coast of Tripolitania and Cyrenaica. He died a few months later, on 4 March 1912, on board the pre-dreadnought battleship Vittorio Emanuele.
