= Thekla Friedländer =

German soprano and social reformer

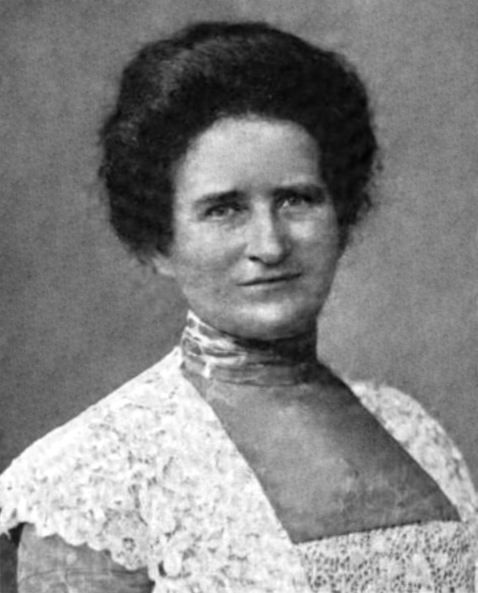
- Born: 6 April 1849; Leipzig, Kingdom of Saxony
- Occupations: Soprano and social reformer

Thekla Friedländer (born 6 April 1849; date of death unknown) was a German soprano and social reformer.

== Career ==
Friedländer was born in 1849 in Leipzig, Saxony, Germany. She had an elder sister called Marie Friedländer.

Friedländer was a soprano and began her career in Europe. Her recital at St. James's Hall in London in November 1875 was her first appearance in England and reportedly caused a "sensation." She then toured with the Jiminez Company in the Netherlands.

Among her repertoire were compositions by Ludwig van Beethoven, Johannes Brahms, Hans Von Bülow, Edvard Grieg, Heinrich Marschener, Felix Mendelssohn, Franz Schubert and Robert Schumann.

== Activism ==
Friedländer was also a social reformer who campaigned for the improvement of women's prisons and children's institutions in Prussia and engaged in training as part of her activism. In 1904, she worked towards female superintendents being employed in the place of the male inspectors in women's prisons. In 1909, she spoke at a conference regarding the adoption of "social scientific" models in the juvenile justice system.
