= Oshawa City Council =

Governing body of Oshawa, Ontario

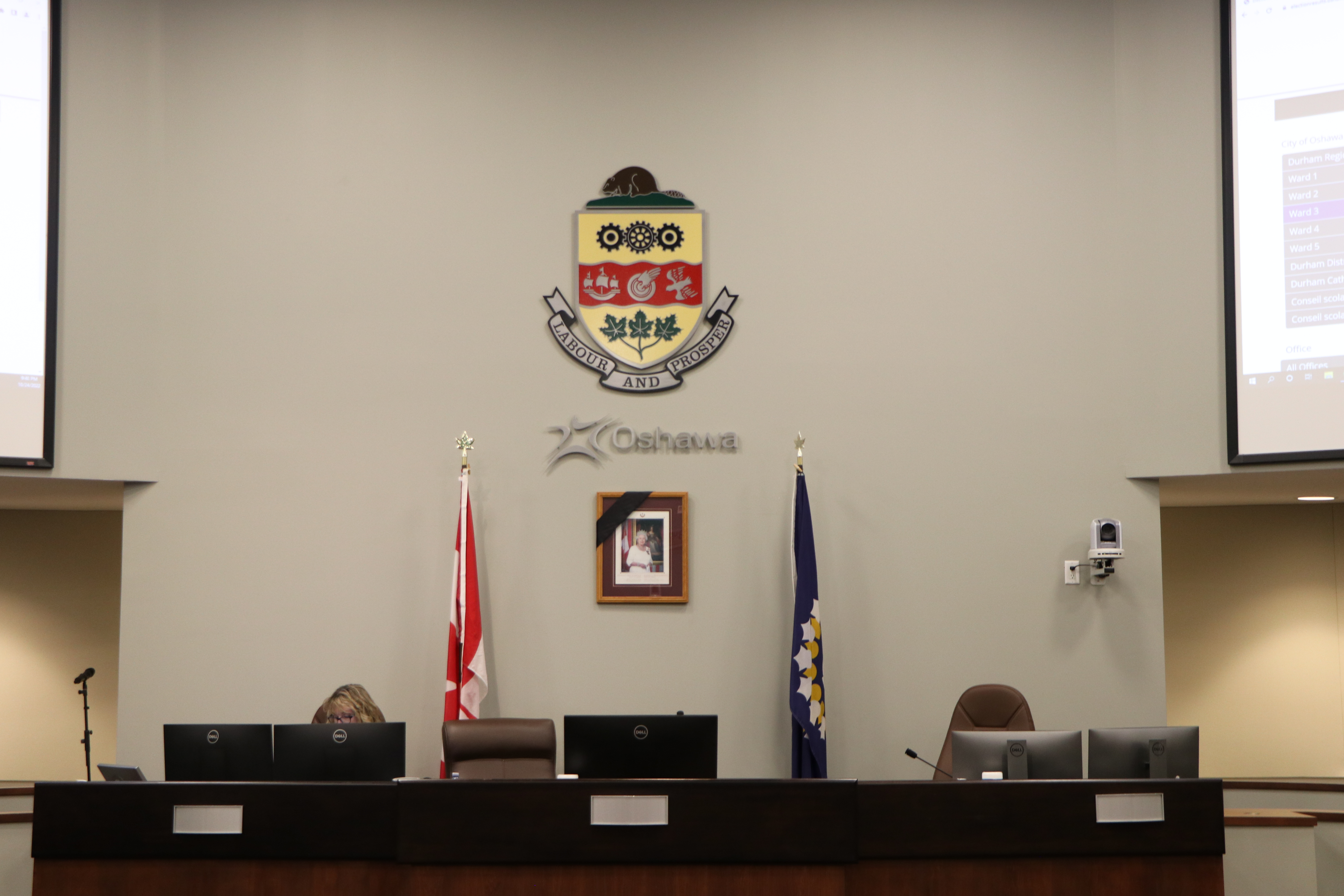

Type
- Type: City Council
- Term limits: None

History
- New session started: November 15, 2022

Leadership
- Mayor of Oshawa: Dan Carter since December 3, 2018
- Deputy Mayor of Oshawa: Bob Chapman since December 3, 2018

Structure
- Seats: 11
- Length of term: 4 years

Elections
- Last election: October 24, 2022 (11 seats)
- Next election: October 26, 2026 (11 seats)

Meeting place
- Council Chamber, Oshawa City Hall; Oshawa, Ontario

Website
- Official website

Oshawa City Council is the governing body of the city of Oshawa, Ontario. The council has 11 members, consisting of 5 regional and city councillors and 5 city councillors plus the mayor.

The city posts agendas for council and committee meetings.

== History ==
Prior to 1985, city councillors were elected at large, with "regional and city" councillors who would serve on both city council and the Durham Region council, and "local city" councillors who would only serve on city council. From 1985-2010, the city moved to a ward-based system, ensuring equal representation for all residents. The city returned to at large elections in 2010 and 2014, before returning to a ward-based system in 2018.

Based on the current ward-based system, Oshawa voters elect:

- one candidate for Mayor, elected city-wide;
- one candidate for Regional & City Councillor, elected from their ward; and,
- one candidate for City Councillor, elected from their ward.

== Committees ==
There are four standing committees of council:

1. Community & Operations Services Committee
2. Corporate & Finance Services Committee
3. Economic & Development Services Committee
4. Safety & Facilities Services Committee

== Members ==
=== 2022–2026 ===
The current council elected in the 2022 Oshawa municipal election:

Image	Member of Council	Office	Notes
	Dan Carter	Mayor	
	John Neal	Ward 1 Regional & City Councillor	
	Rosemary McConkey	Ward 1 City Councillor	
	Tito-Dante Marimpietri	Ward 2 Regional & City Councillor	
	Jim Lee	Ward 2 City Councillor	
	Bob Chapman	Ward 3 Regional & City Councillor	
	Bradley Marks	Ward 3 City Councillor	
	Rick Kerr	Ward 4 Regional & City Councillor	
	Derek Giberson	Ward 4 City Councillor	
	Brian Nicholson	Ward 5 Regional & City Councillor	
	John Gray	Ward 5 City Councillor	

=== 2018-2022 ===
Council elected in the 2018 Durham Region municipal elections:

Councillor	Ward	Notes
Dan Carter	Mayor	
John Neal	Ward 1 - R	
Rosemary McConkey	Ward 1 - C	
Tito-Dante Marimpietri	Ward 2 - R	
Jane Hurst	Ward 2 - C	
Bob Chapman	Ward 3 - R	
Bradley Marks	Ward 3 - C	
Rick Kerr	Ward 4 - R	
Derek Giberson	Ward 4 - C	
Brian Nicholson	Ward 5 - R	
John Gray	Ward 5 - C	

=== 2014-2018 ===
Council elected in the 2014 Durham Region municipal elections:

Councillor	Ward	Notes
John Henry	Mayor	
John Aker	Regional and city councillors	
Dan Carter	Regional and city councillors	
Bob Chapman	Regional and city councillors	
Nancy Diamond	Regional and city councillors	2014-2017; died in office.
Amy McQuaid-England	Regional and city councillors	
John Neal	Regional and city councillors	
Nester Pidwerbecki	Regional and city councillors	
Doug Sanders	Regional and city councillors	2017-2018
Gail Bates	City councillors	2017-2018
Rick Kerr	City councillors	
Doug Sanders	City councillors	2014-2017; transferred to a regional + city seat after death of Nancy Diamond.
John Shields	City councillors	
