= 2010 Durham Region municipal elections =

Candidates in the 2010 Durham Region municipal elections
- October 25, 2010

Elections were held in the Regional Municipality of Durham of Ontario on October 25, 2010 in conjunction with municipal elections across the province.

Candidates marked with an (X) indicates they were the incumbent for that position.

== Durham Regional Council ==
Position	Elected
Chair
Roger Anderson (appointed by council)
Ajax
Mayor	Steve Parish
Regional Councillor, Wards 1 & 2	Shaun Collier
Regional Councillor, Ward 3 & 4	Colleen Jordan
Brock
Mayor	Larry O'Connor
Regional Councillor	Debbie Bath
Clarington
Mayor	Adrian Foster
Regional Councillor, Wards 1 & 2	Mary Novak
Regional Councillor, Wards 3 & 4	Willie Woo
Oshawa
Mayor	John Henry
Regional Councillor	Nancy Diamond
Regional Councillor	Nester Pidwerbecki
Regional Councillor	Tito-Dante Marimpietri
Regional Councillor	John Neal
Regional Councillor	John R. Aker
Regional Councillor	Amy England
Regional Councillor	Bob Chapman
Pickering
Mayor	Dave Ryan
Regional Councillor, Ward 1	Jennifer O'Connell
Regional Councillor, Ward 2	Bill McLean
Regional Councillor, Ward 3	Peter Rodrigues
Scugog
Mayor	Chuck Mercier
Regional Councillor	Bobbie Drew
Uxbridge
Mayor	Gerri Lynn O'Connor
Regional Councillor	Jack Ballinger
Whitby
Mayor	Pat Perkins
Regional Councillor	Don Mitchell
Regional Councillor	Lorne Earle Coe
Regional Councillor	Joe Drumm

== Referendum ==
2010 Durham Region Referendum
- October 25, 2010
- Are you in favour of the Council of the Regional Municipality of Durham passing the necessary resolutions and by-laws to change the method of selecting its Chair from appointment by the members of Regional Council to election by general vote of all electors in the Region?

Results
Choice	Votes	%
Yes	95,377	79.70%
No	24,289	20.30%
Valid votes	119,666	100.00%
Invalid or blank votes	0	0.00%
Total votes	119,666	100.00%
Registered voters/turnout	432,256	27.68%
- Map showing the vote strength of each option in each of the 8 municipalities. The municipalities shaded in Blue voted a majority for "Yes". Pie Charts indicate the total votes received by each option per municipality.

Voters were asked whether they were in favour of the Regional Council changing the method of selecting the Regional Chair from appointment by the Council to election by the voters. 79.70% of voters voted Yes.

These results would be binding if turnout exceeded 50%. However, turnout remained only at 27.68%, meaning there was no legislative requirement for the Regional Council to implement these results. Despite this, on April 4, 2012, the Council voted 24-2 in favour of implementing the results. The change required a "triple-vote majority": from voters, from the Council, and from the eight lower-tier municipal councils. On May 29, 2012, Whitby became the fifth municipality to approve the change, joining Ajax, Clarington, Oshawa, and Pickering. The change also required the electors in the approving municipalities to form a majority of electors in the region, and this requirement was also fulfilled when Whitby Town Council approved the change. As a result, the method of selecting the Regional Chair was changed from an appointment by the Regional Council to a general vote by all voters in the region, and the position was first elected in the 2014 elections.

The method remained until the 2026 elections, when, following the passage of the "Better Regional Governance Act", the provincial government will appoint the Regional Chair.

The following are the results of the plebiscite, broken down by each lower-tier municipality (i.e., city, town, township, and municipality) of the region.

Lower-tier Municipality	Yes		No	
Lower-tier Municipality	Votes	%	Votes	%
Ajax	13,788	85.31	2,375	14.69
Brock	3,017	72.87	1,123	27.13
Clarington	13,532	82.48	2,874	17.52
Oshawa	21,117	78.36	5,833	21.64
Pickering	14,905	83.38	2,972	16.62
Scugog	5,082	66.45	2,566	33.55
Uxbridge	4,765	68.83	2,158	31.17
Whitby	19,171	81.37	4,388	18.63
Total	95,377	79.70	24,289	20.30

== Ajax ==
The following are the official results for the Town of Ajax.

=== Mayor ===
Mayor Steve Parish was re-elected.

Candidate	Vote	%
Steve Parish (X)	13,541	79.08
Sherry Clymer	3,582	20.92

=== Regional Councillors ===
Candidate	Vote	%
Wards 1 & 2
Shaun Collier	3,385	
Scott Crawford (X)	3,047	
Khari Gaynor	1,257	
Wards 3 & 4
Coleen Jordan (X)	5,516	
Kim Dowds	3,403	

=== Ward Councillors ===
Candidate	Vote	%
Ward 1
Marilyn Crawford	1,753	
Katie Kortekaas	1,314	
Robert MacArthur	571	
Jacob McMaster	220	
Raymond Durrani	198	
Ward 2
Renrick Ashby (X)	2,064	
Nancy Henry	1,494	
Chandra Kumaran	246	
Ward 3
Joanne Dies (X)	1,999	
Marsha Jones Dooley	1,217	
Terry Knox	1,007	
Ward 4
Pat Brown (X)	2,589	
Lisa Patel	1,276	
Lynda Everson	1,259	

== Brock ==
The following are the official results for the Township of Brock.

=== Mayor ===
Larry O'Connor, the incumbent mayor of Brock, was reelected by a margin of just 13 votes over challenger Terry Clayton, who had previously been mayor of the township from 2000 to 2003. The narrow margin resulted in an ongoing judicial recount battle; the township used a mail-in voting system in 2010, and when ballots which were postmarked before election day but arrived late were counted, O'Connor's margin of victory was reduced to just three votes.

O'Connor voluntarily resigned as mayor on March 28, 2011, and the township council subsequently appointed Clayton as the new mayor.

Candidate	Vote	%
Larry O'Connor (X)	2,339	50.14
Terry Clayton	2,326	49.86

=== Regional Councillor ===
Candidate	Vote	%
Debbie Bath	2,320	50.22
John Grant (X)	1,609	34.83
Allan Simpson	691	14.96

=== Local Councillors ===
Candidate	Vote	%
Ward 1
Mike Manchester (X)	584	69.19
Mike Da Costa	260	30.81
Ward 2
Randy Skinner (X)	Acclaimed	
Ward 3
Walter Schummer	699	61.26
Anthony Woodruff (X)	442	38.74
Ward 4
Keith Shier	464	54.27
David Marquis (X)	391	45.73
Ward 5
Ted Smith (X)	Acclaimed	

== Clarington ==
The following are the official results for the Municipality of Clarington.

=== Mayor ===
Local Councillor for Ward 1 Adrian Foster defeated Mayor Jim Abernathy.

Candidate	Vote	%
Adrian Foster	6,905	35.51
Jim Abernethy (X)	6,135	31.55
Paul Adams	5,740	29.52
Jeremy Woodcock	664	3.42

=== Regional Councillors ===
Two Regional Councillors were elected in 1 of 2 wards.

Candidate	Vote	%
Wards 1 & 2
Mary Novak (X)	4,113	39.15
Don MacArthur	3,475	33.08
Lynn McCullough	2,917	27.77
Wards 3 & 4
Willie Woo	5,960	70.73
Gord Robinson	2,354	27.93
Carl Zmozynski	113	1.34

=== Local Councillors ===
Four Local Councillors were elected in 1 of 4 wards.

Candidate	Vote	%
Ward 1
Joe Neal	2,046	36.73
Oudit Rai	1,216	21.83
Mark Stanisz	733	13.16
Steven Conway	590	10.59
Paul Powers	570	10.23
Karen Hills	301	5.40
Donald Baragar	115	2.06
Ward 2
Ron Hooper (X)	4,067	82.26
Steve Rowland	511	10.34
Kenneth Finney	366	7.40
Ward 3
Corinna Traill	1,694	43.69
Tracey Ali	1,012	26.10
Mark Canning	635	16.38
Steve Simic	536	13.83
Ward 4
Wendy Partner	1,183	27.85
Tim Tufts	925	21.77
Robert Jackson	592	13.94
Cecil Mackesey	581	13.28
Dean Perrin	564	13.28
Chris Brown	325	7.65
Robert Willett	78	1.84

== Oshawa ==
The following are the official results for the City of Oshawa.

Following a plebiscite in 2006, Oshawa got rid of the ward system which had been in place since 1985 returned to electing councillors at-large, which had been the historical system from 1933 to 1985.

=== Mayor ===
City Councillor John Henry defeated Mayor John Gray.

Candidate	Vote	%
John Henry	15,268	46.58
John Gray (X)	8,973	27.37
Louise V. Parkes	3,941	12.02
Cathy Clarke	2,959	9.02
Bill Longworth	1,383	4.21
Eve E. Simson	137	0.41
Dale Jodoin	115	0.35

=== Regional & City Councillors ===
Candidate	Vote	%
Nancy Diamond	16,011	9.79
Nester Pidwerbecki (X)	13,451	8.23
Tito-Dante Marimpietri	12,189	7.45
John Neal (X)	12,105	7.40
John R. Aker	11,934	7.30
Amy England	10,266	6.28
Bob Chapman	10,008	6.12
Brian C. Nicholson (X)	9,681	5.92
Robert Lutczyk (X)	7,113	4.35
Bruce F. Smith	6,065	3.71
Johnny Milosh	5,962	3.65
Joy Wawrzyniak	5,591	3.42
Debbie M. Grills	5,261	3.22
Kevin E. Brady	4,754	2.91
Doug Hawkins	4,744	2.90
Bill Steele	4,253	2.60
Shane W. G. Kelly	4,239	2.59
Bob Rutherford	3,790	2.32
Bill P. Harris	3,110	1.90
Trevor K. Bardens	2,720	1.66
Richard E. Stark	2,294	1.40
Bonnie A. Powers-Edgar	2,243	1.37
Brandon J. Harris	1,925	1.18
Thomas E. Mitchell	1,435	0.88
Dave A. Spackman	1,251	0.77
Brian T. Clabby	1,124	0.69

=== City Councillors ===
Candidate	Vote	%
Roger Bouma	12,432	16.52
Bruce Wood	7,442	9.89
Mike A. Nicholson	5,886	7.82
Maryanne Sholdra (X)	5,482	7.28
Doug R. Sanders	5,184	6.89
Mark Paton	4,294	5.70
George Gus Milosh	4,228	5.62
William D. Thurber	4,153	5.52
Jesse M. Cullen	4,022	5.34
Gordon K. Vickers	3,680	4.89
Doug R. Terwillegar	3,526	4.68
Nick Post	3,140	4.17
Mike A. Kalynko	2,599	3.45
Dave R. Gilbert	2,416	3.21
Danny LeBlanc	2,267	3.01
Pierre Dupont	1,989	2.64
Barry L. Dutton	1,712	2.27
Esrick H. Quintyn	816	1.08

== Pickering ==
The following are the official results for the City of Pickering.

=== Mayor ===
Mayor Dave Ryan won re-election, defeating Maurice Brenner, former Ward 1 Local/City Councillor and former Ward 1 Regional Councillor.

Candidate	Vote	%
Dave Ryan (X)	10,361	51.21
Maurice Brenner	8,661	42.80
Ken W. Nash	1,212	5.99

=== Regional Councillors ===
Candidate	Vote	%
Ward 1
Jennifer O'Connell	4,065	55.10
Bonnie Littley (X)	3,313	44.90
Ward 2
Bill McLean	Acclaimed	
Ward 3
Peter Rodrigues	4,021	54.18
Rick Johnson (X)	3,400	45.82

=== City Councillors ===
Candidate	Vote	%
Ward 1
Kevin Ashe	2,615	35.47
Sherry Croteau	2,101	28.50
James Blair	1,174	15.92
Rob McCaig	993	13.47
Joe Przybylo	490	6.65
Ward 2
Doug Dickerson (X)	2,614	50.09
Ian Cumming	1,905	36.50
Garth Atkinson	548	10.50
Pasquale Malandrino	152	2.91
Ward 3
David Pickles (X)	4,602	63.64
Laurissa M. Hraiki	982	13.58
Michael Odle	843	11.66
Brian Evely	804	11.12

== Scugog ==
The following are the official results for the Township of Scugog.

=== Mayor ===
Mayor did not run for re-election. Retired Deputy Police Chief Chuck Mercier won the election, defeating Regional Councillor Jim McMillen.

Mayoral Candidate	Vote	%
Chuck Mercier	4,690	55.95
Jim McMillen	3,692	44.05

=== Regional Councillor ===
Candidate	Vote	%
Bobbie Drew	4,421	53.81
Donovan Smith	3,795	46.19

=== Local Councillors ===
Candidate	Vote	%
Ward 1
Larry Corrigan	798	49.20
Cindy Schut	483	29.78
Dan Worner	341	21.02
Ward 2
John Hancock	1,438	67.99
Rick Pearce	677	32.01
Ward 3
Jim Howard	267	28.83
Don Kett	239	25.81
Frank Smith	230	24.84
Mike Kapustin	190	20.52
Ward 4
Wilma Wotten	1,415	81.00
David Nicholishen	332	19.00
Ward 5
Howard Danson	938	54.63
David Robinson	779	45.37

== Uxbridge ==
The following are the official results for the Township of Uxbridge.

=== Mayor ===
Former Mayor Gerri Lynn O'Connor defeated incumbent Mayor Bob Shepherd.

Candidate	Vote	%
Gerri Lynn O'Connor	4,293	53.04
Bob Shepherd (X)	3,150	38.92
George Apostolou	651	8.04

=== Regional Councillor ===
Candidate	Vote	%
Jack Ballinger	3,647	45.75
Ted Eng	2,605	32.68
Kathy Wasylenky	1,719	21.57

=== Local Councillors ===
Candidate	Vote	%
Ward 1
Bev J Northeast (X)	587	55.27
Beverley J. Leslie	475	44.73
Ward 2
Patrick Mollloy	678	58.50
Edward Beach	481	41.50
Ward 3
Pat Mikuse (X)	698	58.02
Mary Dube	342	28.43
Thomas Collins	163	13.55
Ward 4
Jacob Mantle	790	31.78
Chris Smith	566	22.77
Roger Varley	521	20.96
Michale R Whiston	422	16.98
Christy Moores	187	7.52
Ward 5
Gordon Highet (X)	1,303	63.94
Blaire Emmerson	311	15.26
Paul Mateciuk	256	12.56
Joe Amarelo	168	8.24

== Whitby ==
The following are the official results for the Town of Whitby.

=== Mayor ===
Mayor Pat Perkins won re-election, defeating business owner Rocky Varcoe and former Mayor Marcel Brunelle.

Mayoral Candidate	Vote	%
Pat Perkins (X)	12,064	47.55
Rocky Varcoe	8,987	35.42
Marcel Brunelle	4,322	17.03

=== Regional Councillors ===
Candidate	Vote	%
Don Mitchell (X)	13,319	22.59
Lorne Coe	13,264	22.50
Joe Drumm (X)	12,076	20.48
John Dolstra	8,817	14.96
Linda Lyons	8,096	13.73
Dave Sansom	3,383	5.74

=== Local Councillors ===
Candidate	Vote	%
Ward 1 North
Tracy Hanson	2,110	46.12
Sue Ptichforth (X)	1,908	41.70
John Shaver	557	12.17
Ward 2 West
Elizabeth Roy (X)	4,354	64.02
Debra Shadlock	970	14.26
Chudi Asidianya	903	13.28
Ayoub Ali	574	8.44
Ward 3 Centre
Michael G. Emm	2,785	49.92
Shirley Scott (X)	2,462	44.13
Bill Caukwell	332	5.95
Ward 4 East
Ken Montague	2,293	32.13
Michael O'Hare	2,135	29.91
Julie Rennie	1,830	25.64
Kelly Kane	519	7.27
Richard Morphew	360	5.04
