= 2014 Durham Region municipal elections =

2014 Durham Chair election
- October 27, 2014
- Turnout: 31.05%
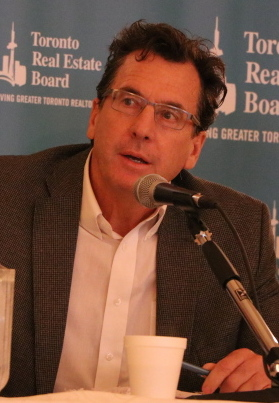
| | RA | MD |
| Candidate | Roger Anderson | Michael Deegan | Peter Neal |
| Popular vote | 57,905 | 18,318 | 14,483 |
| Percentage | 46.70% | 14.77% | 11.68 |
| | AA | LP | BP |
| Candidate | Arthur Augustine | Lynn Porteous | Barbara Pulst |
| Popular vote | 13,169 | 10,684 | 9,441 |
| Percentage | 10.62% | 8.62% | 7.61% |
- Map showing the winning candidate's vote strength in each of the 8 municipalities. The municipalities shaded in Blue voted a majority for John Henry. Pie Charts indicate the total votes received by each candidate per municipality.
Chair before election
Roger Anderson (appointed)
Elected Chair
Roger Anderson

Elections were held in the Regional Municipality of Durham of Ontario on October 27, 2014 in conjunction with municipal elections across the province.

It marked the first time Durham residents elected their regional chair, after voting for the right to do so in a plebiscite held in 2010.

Candidates marked with an (X) indicates they were the incumbent for that position.

== Durham Regional Council ==
| Position | Elected |
Chair
Roger Anderson
Ajax
| Mayor | Steve Parish |
| Regional Councillor, Wards 1 & 2 | Shaun Collier |
| Regional Councillor, Ward 3 & 4 | Colleen Jordan |
Brock
| Mayor | John Grant |
| Regional Councillor | Ted Smith |
Clarington
| Mayor | Adrian Foster |
| Regional Councillor, Wards 1 & 2 | Joe Neal |
| Regional Councillor, Wards 3 & 4 | Willie Woo |
Oshawa
| Mayor | John Henry |
| Regional Councillor | Nancy Diamond |
| Regional Councillor | Amy England |
| Regional Councillor | Dan Carter |
| Regional Councillor | Nester Pidwerbecki |
| Regional Councillor | John Aker |
| Regional Councillor | John Neal |
| Regional Councillor | Bob Chapman |
Pickering
| Mayor | Dave Ryan |
| Regional Councillor, Ward 1 | Jennifer O'Connell |
| Regional Councillor, Ward 2 | Bill McLean |
| Regional Councillor, Ward 3 | David Pickles |
Scugog
| Mayor | Tom Rowett |
| Regional Councillor | Bobbie Drew |
Uxbridge
| Mayor | Gerri Lynn O'Connor |
| Regional Councillor | Jack Ballinger |
Whitby
| Mayor | Don Mitchell |
| Regional Councillor | Elizabeth Roy |
| Regional Councillor | Lorne Coe |
| Regional Councillor | Joe Drumm |

== Durham Regional Chair ==
Roger Anderson, who served as Regional Chair since 1997 through appointment by the Council, won the election.

The following are the official results for the position of the Durham Regional Chair.

| Candidate | Vote | % |
|---|---|---|
| Roger Anderson | 57,905 | 46.70 |
| Michael Deegan | 18,318 | 14.77 |
| Peter Neal | 14,483 | 11.68 |
| Arthur Augustine | 13,167 | 10.62 |
| Lynn Porteous | 10,684 | 8.86 |
| Barbara Pulst | 9,441 | 7.61 |

== Ajax ==
The following are the official results for the Town of Ajax.

=== Mayor ===
Mayor Steve Parish won re-election.

| Candidate | Vote | % |
|---|---|---|
| Steve Parish (X) | 18,603 | 83.16 |
| Waran Vaithilingam | 2,171 | 9.70 |
| Tony Hoosain | 1,597 | 7.14 |

=== Regional Councillors ===
| Candidate | Vote | % |
Wards 1 & 2
| Shaun Collier (X) | 7,735 | 65.56 |
| Tyrone H. Fernando | 4,064 | 34.44 |
Wards 3 & 4
| Coleen Jordan (X) | 7,359 | 74.38 |
| Kim Dowds | 2,535 | 25.62 |

=== Ward Councillors ===
| Candidate | Vote | % |
Ward 1
| Marilyn Crawford (X) | 3,449 | 64.47 |
| Nadine Walker | 1,253 | 23.42 |
| Julian J. Ramdyal | 479 | 8.95 |
| Krystyna Roussy | 169 | 3.16 |
Ward 2
| Renrick Ashby (X) | 2,139 | 31.67 |
| Nancy Henry | 1,645 | 24.35 |
| Rob Tyler Morin | 1,597 | 23.64 |
| Waqqas Syed | 960 | 14.21 |
| Muhammad Asif | 414 | 6.13 |
Ward 3
| Joanne Dies (X) | 2,997 | 64.75 |
| Marsha Jones Dooley | 1,193 | 25.78 |
| Veronica Vernon | 438 | 9.46 |
Ward 4
| Pat Brown (X) | 3,940 | 71.71 |
| Kurtis McAleer | 1,554 | 28.29 |

== Brock ==
The following are the official results for the Township of Brock.

=== Mayor ===
Former Regional Councillor and former Local Councillor John Grant defeated Mayor Terry Clayton, who was appointed by the township council after the resignation of Mayor Larry O'Connor.

| Candidate | Vote | % |
|---|---|---|
| John Grant | 2,120 | 48.04 |
| Terry Clayton (X) | 1,919 | 43.49 |
| Dorothy Sanderson | 374 | 8.47 |

=== Regional Councillor ===
| Candidate | Vote | % |
|---|---|---|
| Ted Smith | 1,722 | 40.07 |
| Joe Allin | 1,494 | 34.76 |
| Penny Judge | 891 | 20.73 |
| Wayne Dunnett | 191 | 4.44 |

=== By-election ===
On September 19, 2016, a by-election was held in Ward 2 to replace Local Councillor Randy Skinner, who resigned due to being diagnosed with Parkinson's disease. Cyndi Schaffer won the election.

| Candidate | Vote | % |
Ward 2
| Cyndi Schaffer | 125 | 27.96 |
| George Ranich | 113 | 25.28 |
| Wayne Dunnett | 107 | 23.93 |
| Bill Brotherston | 96 | 21.48 |
| Dorothy Sanderson | 6 | 1.34 |

== Clarington ==
The following are the results for the Municipality of Clarington. There was a voter turn-out of 30.53%.

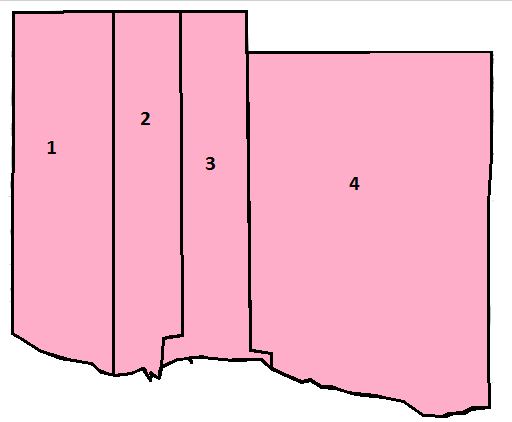
Map of Clarington's four wards

=== Mayor ===
Mayor Adrian Foster won re-election, defeating former MPP for Durham John O'Toole.

| Candidate | Vote | % |
|---|---|---|
| Adrian Foster (X) | 10,093 | 53.62 |
| John O'Toole | 8,731 | 46.38 |

=== Regional Councillors ===
Two Regional Councillors were elected in 1 of 2 wards.

| Candidate | Vote | % |
Wards 1 & 2
| Joe Neal | 3,962 | 37.17 |
| Mary Novak (X) | 3,959 | 37.14 |
| Jim Abernethy | 2,738 | 25.69 |
Wards 3 & 4
| Willie Woo (X) | Acclaimed | |

=== Local Councillors ===
Four Local Councillors were elected in 1 of 4 wards.

| Candidate | Vote | % |
Ward 1
| Steven Cooke | 1,247 | 24.24 |
| Thomas Sheehan | 1,127 | 21.90 |
| Sami Elhajjeh | 1,048 | 20.37 |
| Steven Conway | 929 | 18.06 |
| Mark Stanisz | 422 | 8.20 |
| Jacqueline Muccio | 372 | 7.23 |
Ward 2
| Ron Hooper (X) | 4,132 | 80.51 |
| Lynn McCullough | 1,000 | 19.49 |
Ward 3
| Corinna Traill (X) | 1,593 | 39.47 |
| Bonnie Seto | 1,400 | 34.69 |
| Tracey Ali | 559 | 13.85 |
| Mark Canning | 484 | 11.99 |
Ward 4
| Wendy Partner (X) | 2,135 | 53.56 |
| Kevin Anyan | 1,079 | 27.07 |
| Zachery Prescott | 772 | 19.37 |

== Oshawa ==
The following are the official results for the City of Oshawa.

=== Mayor ===
Mayor John Henry won re-election, defeating former Mayor John Gray.

| Candidate | Vote | % |
|---|---|---|
| John Henry (X) | 14,084 | 48.93 |
| John Gray | 8,229 | 28.59 |
| Rosemary McConkey | 2,619 | 9.10 |
| Chris Topple | 1,978 | 6.87 |
| Bill Longworth | 642 | 2.23 |
| Lou Devuono | 564 | 1.96 |
| Joe Ingino | 374 | 1.30 |
| Dan Hammond | 221 | 0.77 |
| Donald F. Woermke | 72 | 0.25 |

=== Regional & City Councillors ===
Seven Regional & City Councillors were elected.

| Candidate | Vote | % |
|---|---|---|
| Nancy Diamond (X) | 15,620 | 10.35 |
| Amy England (X) | 13,518 | 8.96 |
| Dan Carter | 12,042 | 7.98 |
| Nester Pidwerbecki (X) | 11,890 | 7.88 |
| John Aker (X) | 11,529 | 7.64 |
| John Neal (X) | 10,563 | 7.00 |
| Bob Chapman (X) | 9,374 | 6.21 |
| Tito-Dante Marimpietri (X) | 9,240 | 6.12 |
| Dianne C. Ouellette | 8,825 | 5.85 |
| Shane Kelly | 8,649 | 5.73 |
| Brian Nicholson | 7,822 | 5.18 |
| John McVey | 5,079 | 3.37 |
| Debbie Grills | 4,955 | 3.28 |
| Robert Stevenson | 3,414 | 2.26 |
| David Purdy | 3,277 | 2.17 |
| Adam Wagstaffe | 3,240 | 2.15 |
| Mac Moreau | 2,878 | 1.91 |
| George Gus Milosh | 2,871 | 1.90 |
| Chris Bain | 2,338 | 1.55 |
| Fred Hines | 1,822 | 1.21 |
| Tariq Rana | 1,129 | 0.75 |
| Wally Petrie | 839 | 0.56 |

=== City Councillors ===
Three City Councillors were elected.

| Candidate | Vote | % |
|---|---|---|
| Doug Sanders (X) | 8,751 | 13.35 |
| John Shields | 8,232 | 12.55 |
| Rick Kerr | 8,145 | 12.42 |
| Gail Bates | 6,014 | 9.17 |
| Bruce Wood (X) | 5,958 | 9.09 |
| Diane Stephen | 4,441 | 6.77 |
| Derek Giberson | 3,310 | 5.05 |
| Dave Thompson | 2,748 | 4.19 |
| Bev A. Tucker | 2,605 | 3.97 |
| Stuart Smith | 2,398 | 3.66 |
| Danny LeBlanc | 2,230 | 3.40 |
| Sean Lockhart | 1,899 | 2.90 |
| Bill Steele | 1,883 | 2.87 |
| George Pappas | 1,780 | 2.71 |
| Bruce F. Smith | 1,687 | 2.57 |
| Joe Arruda | 1,485 | 2.26 |
| Tom Mitchell | 1,361 | 2.08 |
| Matthew Daniel Johanson | 645 | 0.98 |

=== Plebiscite ===
Are you in favour of electing Oshawa Councillors, being: (i) those elected only to City Council, and (ii) those elected to both City Council and Durham Regional Council, other than the Mayor, by ward vote instead of general city-wide vote?

| Option | Vote | % |
|---|---|---|
| Yes | 19,013 | 71.63 |
| No | 7,530 | 30.27 |

== Pickering ==
The following are the official results for the City of Pickering.

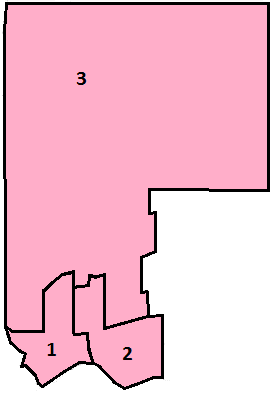
Map of Pickering's three wards

=== Mayor ===
Mayor Dave Ryan won re-election, defeating Maurice Brenner, former Ward 1 Local/City Councillor and former Ward 1 Regional Councillor.

| Candidate | Vote | % |
|---|---|---|
| Dave Ryan (X) | 14,410 | 64.18 |
| Maurice Brenner | 7,205 | 32.09 |
| Edoh Apaloo | 838 | 3.73 |

=== Regional Councillors ===
| Candidate | Vote | % |
Ward 1
| Jennifer O'Connell (X) | 5,555 | 72.08 |
| Nics Tsetsakos | 732 | 9.50 |
| Myrna Picotte | 656 | 8.51 |
| Enrico Pistritto | 638 | 8.28 |
| Shawn Sandrasagara | 126 | 1.63 |
Ward 2
| Bill McLean (X) | 4,033 | 68.90 |
| Keith Falconer | 2,242 | 31.10 |
Ward 3
| David Pickles | 4,301 | 51.79 |
| Peter Rodrigues (X) | 4,003 | 48.21 |

=== City Councillors ===
| Candidate | Vote | % |
Ward 1
| Kevin Ashe (X) | 3,581 | 46.27 |
| Deborah Bissett | 2,213 | 28.59 |
| Lisa Robinson | 1,742 | 22.51 |
| Peter Tijiri | 204 | 2.64 |
Ward 2
| Ian Cumming | 2,536 | 42.18 |
| Doug Dickerson (X) | 2,293 | 38.14 |
| Cody Morrison | 1,053 | 17.51 |
| Koober Nuckchedee | 74 | 1.23 |
Ward 3
| Rick Johnson | 4,586 | 57.00 |
| Shaheen Butt | 1,743 | 21.66 |
| Ken Nash | 972 | 12.08 |
| Nick Nikopoulos | 745 | 9.26 |

=== By-election ===
On January 25, 2016, a by-election was held in Ward 1 to replace City Councillor Kevin Ashe, who was appointed to the Regional Council seat vacated due to the election of Jennifer O'Connell to Parliament in the 2015 federal election. Maurice Brenner, former Ward 1 Local/City Councillor and former Ward 1 Regional Councillor, won the election.

The below table shows the official results of the by-election.

| Candidate | Vote | % |
Ward 1
| Maurice Brenner | 712 | 21.56 |
| Lisa Robinson | 662 | 20.04 |
| Chris van der Vliet | 472 | 14.29 |
| Gary Hugh Strange | 462 | 13.99 |
| Lisa McFarland | 316 | 9.57 |
| Peter Rodrigues | 275 | 8.33 |
| Deborah Bissett | 191 | 5.78 |
| Nancy Granados | 68 | 2.06 |
| Anita Otto | 60 | 1.82 |
| Tate Besso | 47 | 1.42 |
| Alma Sandoval | 27 | 0.82 |
| Anthony Jordan Navarro | 11 | 0.33 |

== Scugog ==
The following are the official results for the Township of Scugog.

=== Mayor ===
Business owner and financial adviser Tom Rowett defeated incumbent Mayor Chuck Mercier.

| Candidate | Vote | % |
|---|---|---|
| Tom Rowett | 4,661 | 55.83 |
| Chuck Mercier (X) | 3,687 | 44.17 |

=== Regional Councillor ===
| Candidate | Vote | % |
|---|---|---|
| Bobbie Drew (X) | Acclaimed | |

=== Local Councillors ===
| Candidate | Vote | % |
Ward 1
| Betty Somerville | 677 | 40.83 |
| Joe Mahoney | 410 | 24.73 |
| Tony Janssen | 399 | 24.07 |
| Scott Burke | 172 | 10.37 |
Ward 2
| Janna Guido | 1,163 | 53.74 |
| John Robert Hancock (X) | 1,001 | 46.26 |
Ward 3
| Don Kett | 649 | 70.31 |
| Bill McKee | 274 | 29.69 |
Ward 4
| Wilma Wotten (X) | 1,161 | 74.38 |
| Aaron Hopkins | 400 | 25.62 |
Ward 5
| Jennifer Back | 1,392 | 69.70 |
| Howard Danson (X) | 605 | 30.30 |

== Uxbridge ==
The following are the official results for the Township of Uxbridge.

=== Mayor ===
Mayor Gerri Lynn O'Connor won re-election.

| Candidate | Vote | % |
|---|---|---|
| Gerri Lynn O'Connor (X) | 3,976 | 49.72 |
| Ted Eng | 2,061 | 25.77 |
| Bob Shepherd | 1,960 | 24.51 |

=== Regional Councillor ===
| Candidate | Vote | % |
|---|---|---|
| Jack Ballinger (X) | 4,056 | 52.61 |
| Jon Taylor | 1,921 | 24.92 |
| Michelle Viney | 1,733 | 22.48 |

=== Local Councillors ===
| Candidate | Vote | % |
Ward 1
| Pamela Beach | 531 | 44.55 |
| Beverly Northeast (X) | 509 | 42.70 |
| Blair Emmerson | 152 | 12.75 |
Ward 2
| Patrick Molloy (X) | 625 | 55.31 |
| Gary Ruona | 505 | 44.69 |
Ward 3
| Pat Mikuse (X) | 581 | 53.75 |
| Bob Harrison | 392 | 36.26 |
| Bruce Rodman | 108 | 9.99 |
Ward 4
| Fred Bryan | 919 | 38.61 |
| Conrad Boyce | 807 | 33.91 |
| Dave Granic | 654 | 27.48 |
Ward 5
| Gordon Highet (X) | 1,255 | 60.28 |
| Joy Whalen | 737 | 35.40 |
| Sally Brady | 90 | 4.32 |

== Whitby ==
The following are the official results for the Town of Whitby.

=== Mayor ===
Mayor Pat Perkins initially ran for re-election, but dropped out to run in the 2014 Whitby—Oshawa federal by-election. Regional Councillor, Deputy Mayor, and Acting Mayor Don Mitchell won the election.

| Candidate | Vote | % |
|---|---|---|
| Don Mitchell | 16,803 | 73.20 |
| Donna Butler | 2,895 | 12.61 |
| Ros Whitby | 1,268 | 5.52 |
| Bob Hartley | 1,129 | 4.92 |
| Lumy Omat | 859 | 3.74 |

=== By-election ===
On June 9, 2016, a by-election was held to replace Local Councillor Derrick Gleed, who was appointed as Regional Councillor after Regional Councillor Lorne Coe won the 2016 Whitby—Oshawa provincial by-election. Rhonda Mulcahy won the election.

The following are the official results.

Ward 1 North
| Rhonda Mulcahy | 1,950 | 36.25 |
| Sean Perkins | 1,147 | 21.32 |
| Nathan Staneland | 1,054 | 19.59 |
| Sameena Asghar | 427 | 7.94 |
| Keith McCaughley | 380 | 7.06 |
| Ron Lane | 199 | 3.70 |
| Christian Pritchard | 185 | 3.44 |
| Dave Sansom | 37 | 0.69 |
