= 2018 Durham Region municipal elections =

2018 Durham Chair election
- October 22, 2018
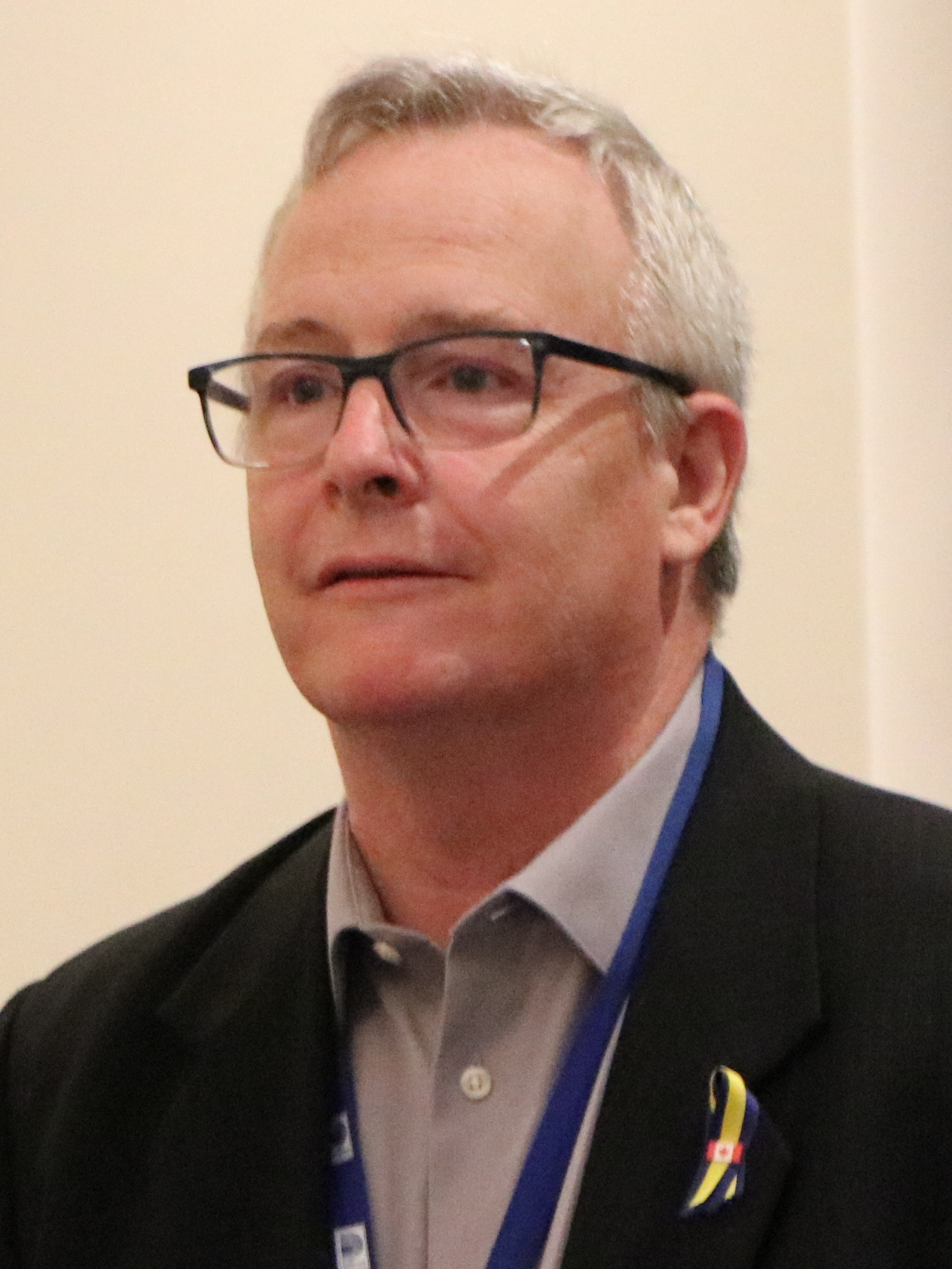

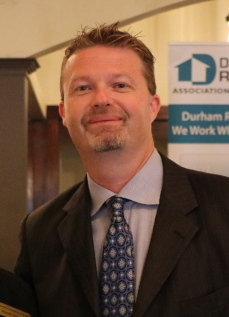

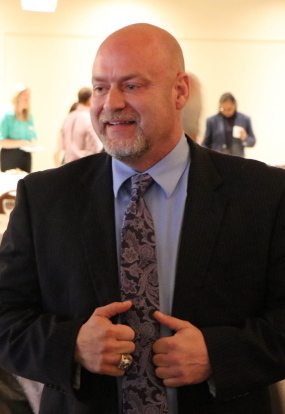

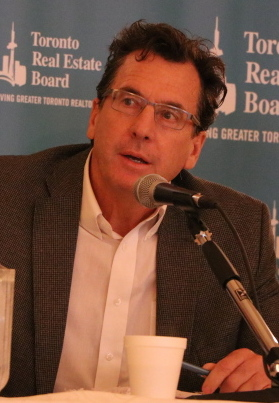
Candidate	John Henry	Tom Dingwall
Popular vote	69,834	25,669
Percentage	55.00%	20.22%
Candidate	John Mutton	Peter Neal
Popular vote	16,800	8,326
Percentage	13.23%	6.56%
- Map showing the winning candidate's vote strength in each of the 8 municipalities. The municipalities shaded in Blue voted a majority for John Henry. Pie Charts indicate the total votes received by each candidate per municipality.
Chair before election
Gerri Lynn O'Connor (interim) (Note: Appointed as interim Chair after the death of Roger Anderson.)
Elected Chair
John Henry

Elections were held in the Regional Municipality of Durham in Ontario, on October 22, 2018 in conjunction with municipal elections across the province.

Candidates marked with an (X) indicates they were the incumbent for that position.

== Durham Regional Council ==
Position	Elected
Chair
John Henry
Ajax
Mayor	Shaun Collier
Regional Councillor, Ward 1	Marilyn Crawford
Regional Councillor, Ward 2	Sterling Lee
Regional Councillor, Ward 3	Joanne Dies
Brock
Mayor	Debbie Bath-Hadden
Regional Councillor	Ted Smith
Clarington
Mayor	Adrian Foster
Regional Councillor, Wards 1 & 2	Joe Neal
Regional Councillor, Wards 3 & 4	Granville Anderson
Oshawa
Mayor	Dan Carter
Regional Councillor, Ward 1	John Neal
Regional Councillor, Ward 2	Tito-Dante Marimpietri
Regional Councillor, Ward 3	Bob Chapman
Regional Councillor, Ward 4	Rick Kerr
Regional Councillor, Ward 5	Brian Nicholson
Pickering
Mayor	Dave Ryan
Regional Councillor, Ward 1	Kevin Ashe
Regional Councillor, Ward 2	Bill McLean
Regional Councillor, Ward 3	David Pickles
Scugog
Mayor	Bobbie Drew
Regional Councillor	Wilma Wotten
Uxbridge
Mayor	Dave Barton
Regional Councillor	Gord Highet
Whitby
Mayor	Don Mitchell
Regional Councillor	Elizabeth Roy
Regional Councillor	Chris Leahy
Regional Councillor	Steve Yamada
Regional Councillor	Rhonda Mulcahy

== Durham Regional Chair ==
Chair Gerri-Lynne O'Connor, who was appointed by the Council after the death of Chair Roger Anderson, did not run for election. Oshawa Mayor John Henry won the election, defeating retired police officer Tom Dingwall and former Clarington Mayor John Mutton.

The following are the official results for the position of Durham Regional Chair.

Candidate	Vote	%
John Henry	69,834	55.00
Tom Dingwall	25,669	20.22
John Mutton	16,800	13.23
Peter Neal	8,326	6.56
Muhammad Ahsin Sahi	6,347	5.00

== Ajax ==
The following are the preliminary results for the Town of Ajax.

Following a ward boundary review, Ajax gained one regional councillor and lost one local councillor for the 2018 election. The overall size of the council remained the same.

=== Mayor ===
2018 Ajax Mayoral election
- October 22, 2018
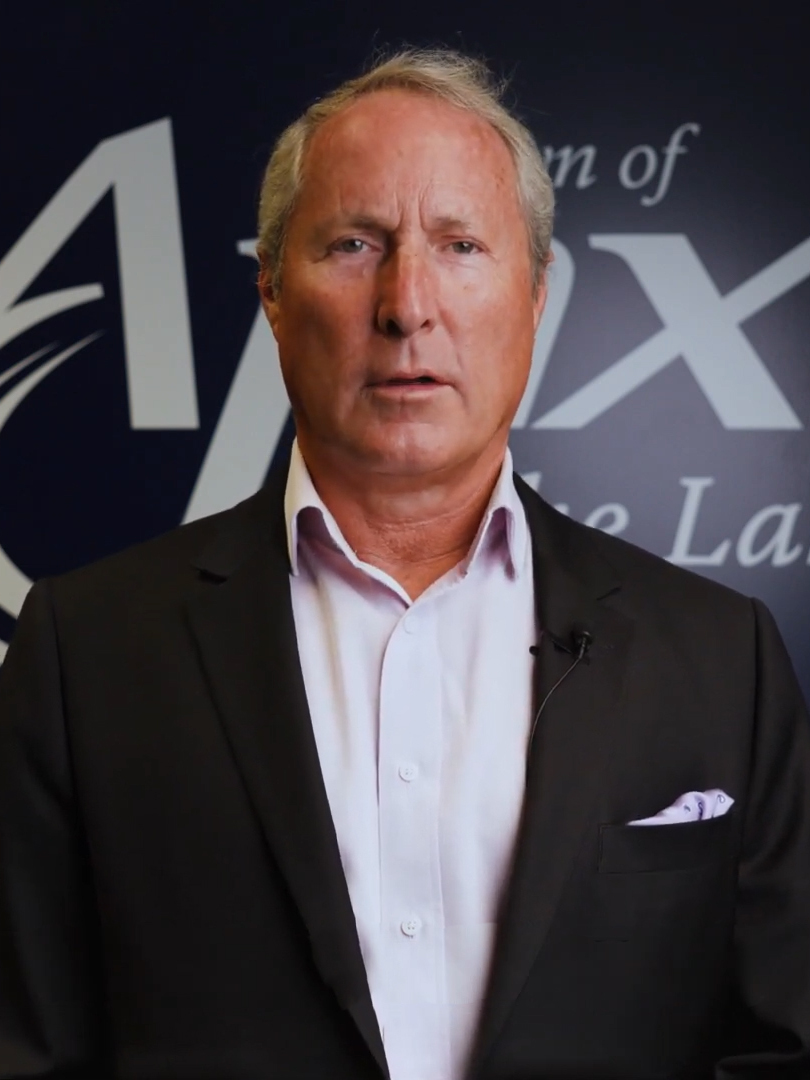
		CJ
Candidate	Shaun Collier	Colleen Jordan
Popular vote	10,799	8,293
Percentage	42.84%	32.90%
	AA	JB
Candidate	Arthur Augustine	Jennifer Brown
Popular vote	1,852	1,735
Percentage	9.87%	9.25%
Mayor before election
Steve Parish
Elected mayor
Shaun Collier

Mayor Steve Parrish did not run for re-election. Regional Councillor for Wards 1 & 2 Shaun Collier won the election, defeating Regional Councillor for Wards 3 & 4 Colleen Jordan.

Candidate	Vote	%
Shaun Collier	10,799	42.84
Colleen Jordan	8,293	32.90
Arthur Augustine	2,996	11.90
Jennifer Brown	2,156	8.55
Carion Fenn	963	3.82

=== Regional Councillors ===
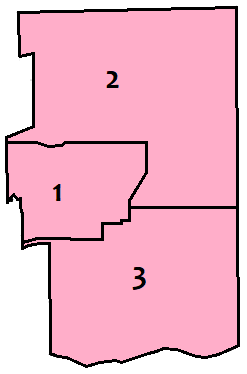
Map of Ajax's three wards

Three Regional Councillors were elected in 1 of 3 wards.

Candidate	Vote	%
Ward 1
Marilyn Crawford	6,738	80.21
Mohamed Karatella	1,662	19.79
Ward 2
Sterling Lee	2,901	41.95
Nancy Henry	2,512	36.33
Muhammad Asif	1,502	21.72
Ward 3
Joanne Dies	6,685	71.32
Kurtis McAleer	2,688	28.68

=== Local Councillors ===
Three Local Councillors were elected in 1 of 3 wards.

Candidate	Vote	%
Ward 1
Rob Tyler Morin	2,378	28.18
Marsha Lynn Jones Dooley	2,078	24.62
Michael Bissonnette	1,914	22.68
Christopher Gillett	708	8.39
Margaret Cecconet	683	8.10
Robert Bishop	678	8.03
Ward 2
Ashmeed Khan	1,530	21.81
Kenroy Wilson	1,421	20.26
Ashish Pandya	1,397	19.92
Tyrone Fernando	1,243	17.72
Scott Crawford	891	12.70
Larry Leung	285	4.10
Arsalan Iqbal	247	3.52
Ward 3
Lisa Bower	4,380	45.80
Pat Brown	2,826	29.55
Clayton McLean	904	9.45
Matthew Pond	886	9.26
Dane Record	317	3.31
Joe Careen	252	2.63

== Brock ==
The following are the official results for the Township of Brock.

=== Mayor ===
2018 Brock Mayoral election
- October 22, 2018
	DBH	JG
Candidate	Debbie Bath-Hadden	John Grant
Popular vote	2,273	2,147
Percentage	51.42%%	48.58%
Mayor before election
John Grant
Elected mayor
Debbie Bath-Hadden

Mayor John Grant was defeated by Regional Councillor Debbie Bath-Hadden, who became the township's first female mayor.

Candidate	Vote	%
Debbie Bath-Hadden	2,273	51.42
John Grant (X)	2,147	48.58

=== Regional Councillor ===
Map of Brock's five wards

One Regional Councillor was elected.

Candidate	Vote	%
Ted Smith (X)	1,851	42.67
Jay Yerema-Weafer	1,245	28.70
Judi Forbes	968	22.31
Dorothy Sanderson	274	6.31

=== Local Councillors ===
Five Local Councillors were elected in 1 of 5 wards.

Candidate	Vote	%
Ward 1
Michael Jubb	542	62.37
Gord Lodwick (X)	327	37.63
Ward 2
Claire Doble	436	59.32
Cyndi Schaffer (X)	245	33.33
Wayne Dunnett	54	7.35
Ward 3
Walter Schummer	670	74.86
Bill Basztyk	225	25.14
Ward 4
Cria Pettingill	373	42.78
Chris Shier	255	29.24
Ralph Maleus	244	28.00
Ward 5
Lynn Campbell (X)	532	50.33
Tony Laundrie	396	37.46
Allan Simpson	129	12.20

== Clarington ==
The following are the official results for the Municipality of Clarington.

=== Mayor ===
2018 Clarington Mayoral election
- October 22, 2018
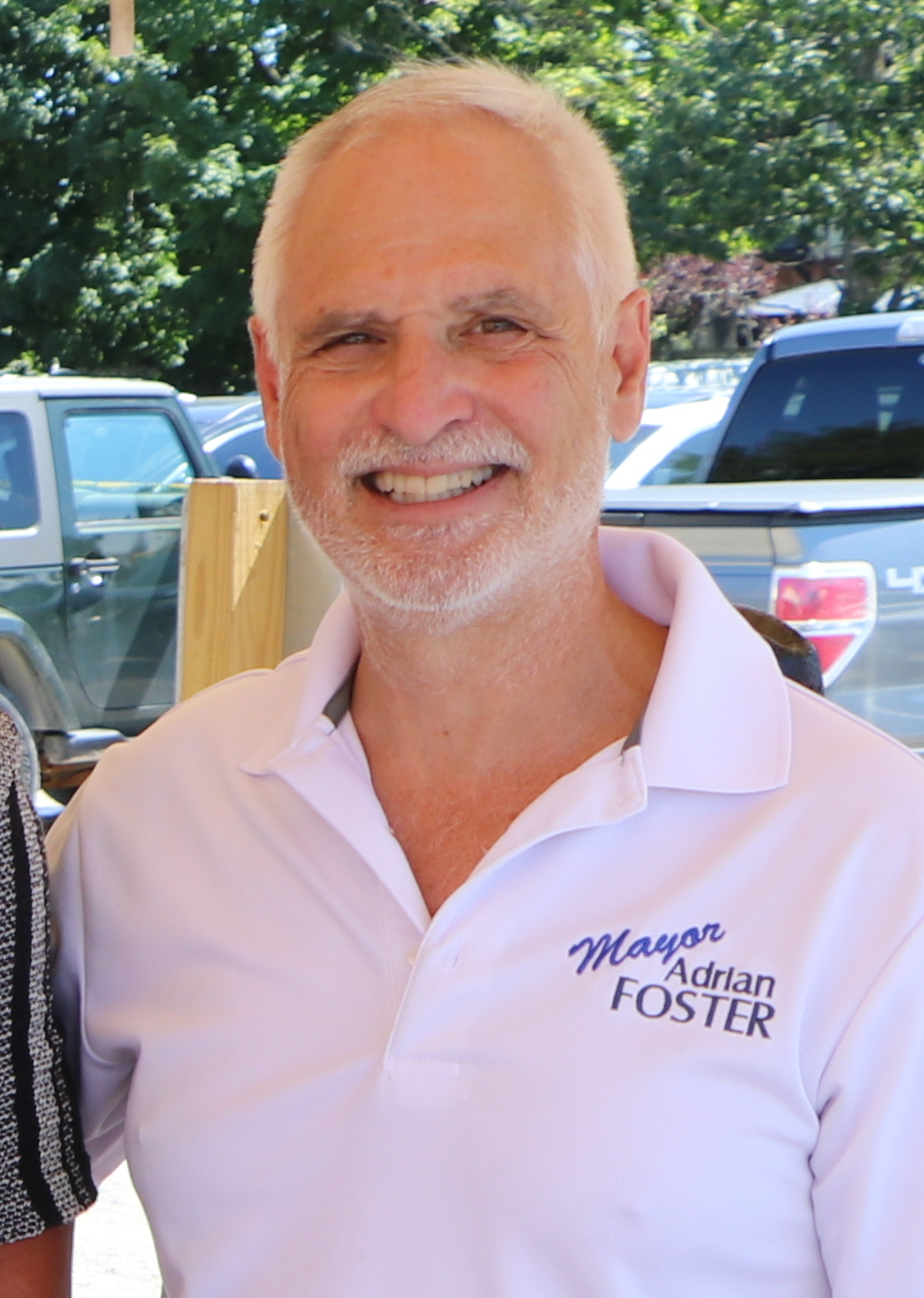
		MC
Candidate	Adrian Foster	Mark Canning
Popular vote	12,507	5,259
Percentage	68.06%	28.62%
Mayor before election
Adrian Foster
Elected mayor
Adrian Foster

Mayor Adrian Foster won re-election.

Candidate	Vote	%
Adrian Foster (X)	12,507	68.06
Mark Canning	5,259	28.62
Matthew Marshall	610	3.32

=== Regional Councillors ===
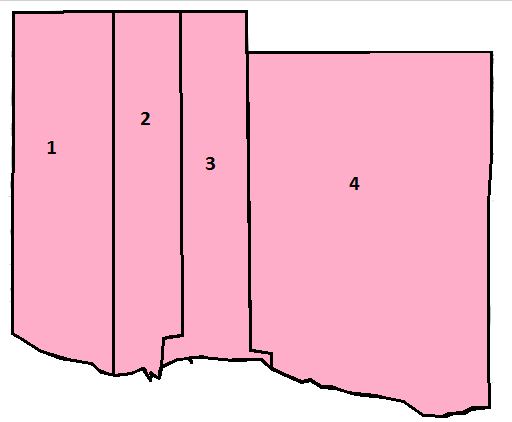
Map of Clarington's four wards

Two Regional Councillors were elected in 1 of 2 wards.

Candidate	Vote	%
Wards 1 & 2
Joe Neal (X)	5,395	51.65
Mary Novak	5,050	48.35
Wards 3 & 4
Granville Anderson	2,675	34.11
Steven Cooke (X)	2,205	28.12
Wendy Partner (X)	2,083	26.56
Peter Vogel	879	11.21

=== Local Councillors ===
Four Local Councillors were elected in 1 of 4 wards.

Candidate	Vote	%
Ward 1
Janice Jones	2,857	52.89
Sami Elhajjeh	1,566	28.99
Franklin Wu	979	18.12
Ward 2
Ron Hooper (X)	3,794	76.23
Maralyn Tassone	1,183	23.77
Ward 3
Corinna Traill (X)	1,957	48.85
Bradley Phillips	973	24.29
Sarah MacDonald	732	18.27
Robert Grovum	344	8.59
Ward 4
Margaret Zwart	1,249	32.57
Zachery Prescott	704	18.36
Alan Harris	703	18.33
Greg Rowden	621	16.19
J.C. Dougan	389	10.14
Evan King	169	4.41

== Oshawa ==
2018 Oshawa Mayoral election
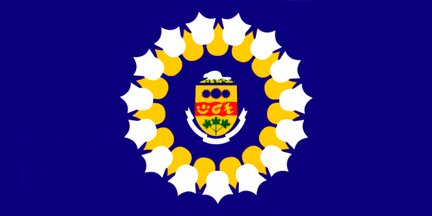
- October 22, 2018
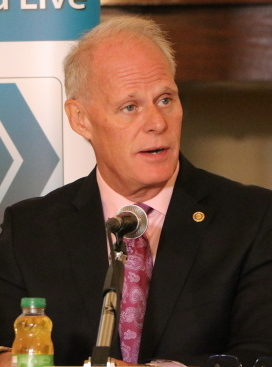

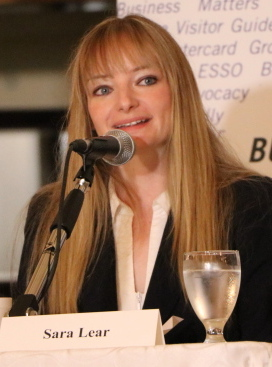

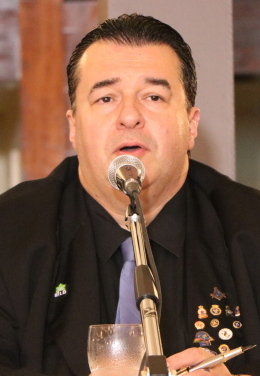
Candidate	Dan Carter	Sara Lear	Joe Ingino
Popular vote	17,630	2,892	1,407
Percentage	69.39%	11.38%	5.54%
Mayor before election
John Henry
Elected mayor
Dan Carter

The following are the preliminary results for the City of Oshawa.

Following a ward boundary review, Oshawa lost two Regional & City Councillors and gained two City Councillors.

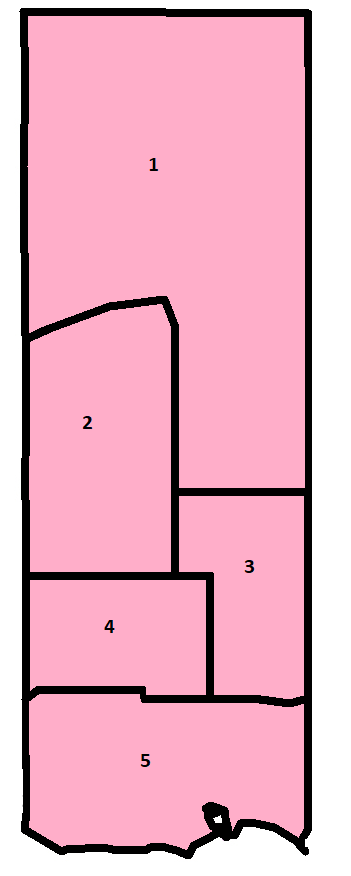
Map of Oshawa's five new wards

For the 2018 election, following a plebiscite in 2014, Oshawa re-adopted a ward based system. Voters in each ward elected one regional councillor and one city councillor.

=== Mayor ===
Mayor John Henry chose to run for Regional Chair instead of for re-election. Regional Councillor for Ward 3 Dan Carter won the election.

Candidate	Vote	%
Dan Carter	17,630	69.39
Sara Lear	2,892	11.38
Joe Ingino	1,407	5.54
Bob Rutherford	1,076	4.24
Adam Kunz	1,057	4.16
Kenneth Carruthers	977	3.85
Rosaldo Russo	367	1.44

=== Regional & City Councillors ===
Five Regional & City Councillors were elected in 1 of 5 wards.

Candidate	Vote	%
Ward 1
John Neal (X)	1,408	50.67
Cathy Clarke	1,051	37.82
Dominic Barone	320	11.51
Ward 2
Tito-Dante Marimpietri	2,136	43.72
Julia McCrea	1,232	25.21
Jim Van Allen	873	17.87
George Milosh	346	7.08
Daniel Cullen	299	6.12
Ward 3
Bob Chapman	3,084	44.14
John Shields (X)	2,555	36.57
Teresa Aker	1,348	19.29
Ward 4
Rick Kerr (X)	3,176	50.55
Doug Sanders (X)	3,107	49.45
Ward 5
Brian Nicholson	1,675	39.74
Nester Pidwerbecki (X)	1,393	33.05
Kim Beatty	1,147	27.21

=== City Councillors ===
Five City Councillors were elected in 1 of 5 wards.

Candidate	Vote	%
Ward 1
Rosemary McConkey	1,152	43.65
Theresa Corless	834	31.60
Robert Stevenson	331	12.54
Diane Stephen	186	7.05
Adam White	136	5.15
Ward 2
Jane Hurst	1,758	37.97
Gail Bates (X)	1,003	21.66
Jonathan Giancroce	853	18.42
Karen Albrecht	815	17.60
Adrian Gianello	201	4.34
Ward 3
Bradley Marks	3,056	45.80
Eric Guernsey	1,494	22.39
Ethan Eastwood	1,280	19.18
Cerise Wilson	843	12.63
Ward 4
Derek Giberson	1,464	23.02
Catherine Hawthorn	941	14.80
Dave Thompson	871	13.69
Mark Logan	791	12.44
Chris Topple	584	9.18
Gregory Milosh	527	8.29
Elizabeth Jamischak	443	6.97
Matthew Kotsopoulos	404	6.35
Clayton Paterson	194	3.05
Michael Goodmurphy	141	2.22
Ward 5
John Gray	2,411	57.79
Alex Down	1,535	36.79
Joe Lococo	226	5.42

== Pickering ==
The following are the official results for the City of Pickering.

=== Mayor ===
2018 Pickering Mayoral election
- October 22, 2018
	DR	EH	WH
Candidate	Dave Ryan	Eileen Higdon	Wesley Henry
Popular vote	12,959	3,647	2,620
Percentage	66.13%	18.61%	13.37%
Mayor before election
Dave Ryan
Elected mayor
Dave Ryan

Mayor Dave Ryan won re-election.

Candidate	Vote	%
Dave Ryan (X)	12,959	66.13
Eileen Higdon	3,647	18.61
Wesley Henry	2,620	13.37
Bert Cortez	370	1.90

=== Regional Councillors ===
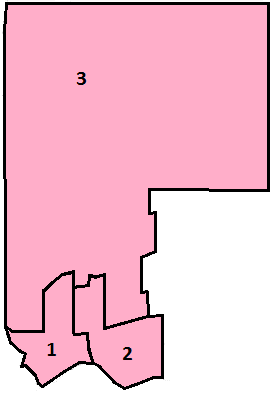
Map of Pickering's three wards

Three Regional Councillors were elected in 1 of 3 wards.

Candidate	Vote	%
Ward 1
Kevin Ashe (X)	3,318	47.90
Musa Mansuar	2,526	36.47
Robert Jones	771	11.13
Usha Chahar	311	4.50
Ward 2
Bill McLean (X)	2,659	54.25
Gary Strange	2,242	45.75
Ward 3
David Pickles (X)	4,468	58.65
Peter Rodrigues	3,150	41.35

=== City Councillors ===
Three City Councillors were elected in 1 of 3 wards.

Candidate	Vote	%
Ward 1
Maurice Brenner (X)	2,707	38.95
Lisa Robinson	2,523	36.30
Tony Harold	779	11.21
Nancy Granados	569	8.19
Clyde Taffe	213	3.06
Haidar Furozuni	159	2.29
Ward 2
Ian Cumming (X)	2,536	53.31
Tanya Foster	891	18.73
Sari Sarieddine	727	15.28
Dave Currie	603	12.68
Ward 3
Shaheen Butt (X)	3,115	41.84
Nadia Peerzada	2,646	35.54
Damian Williams	1,486	20.00
Javed Akhtar	124	1.67
Ali Naqvi	74	1.00

== Scugog ==
The following are the official results for the Township of Scugog.

=== Mayor ===
2018 Scugog Mayoral election
- October 22, 2018
	BD	BS
Candidate	Bobbie Drew	Betty Somerville
Popular vote	4,578	3,239
Percentage	58.56%	41.44%
Mayor before election
Tom Rowett
Elected mayor
Bobbie Drew

Mayor Tom Rowett did not run for re-election. Regional Councillor Bobbie Drew won the election, defeating former Ward 1 Councillor Betty Somerville.

Candidate	Vote	%
Bobbie Drew	4,578	58.56
Betty Somerville	3,239	41.44

=== Regional Councillor ===
Map of Scugog's five wards

One Regional Councillor was elected.

Candidate	Vote	%
Wilma Wotten	4,804	63.04
Marc Gibbons	1,437	18.86
Don Kett	1,100	14.44
Dwayne Marrison	279	3.66

=== Local Councillors ===
Five Local Councillors were elected in 1 of 5 wards.

Candidate	Vote	%
Ward 1
Ian McDougall	681	42.67
David LeRoy	426	26.70
John Debono	354	22.18
Jim Howard	135	8.46
Ward 2
Janna Guido (X)	917	53.85
Tony Janssen	621	36.47
Cindy Sutch	165	9.69
Ward 3
Angus Ross	474	62.37
Charlotte Hale	286	37.63
Ward 4
Deborah Kiezebrink	727	50.03
Jennifer Bankay	326	22.44
Tara-Lyn Mappin	201	13.83
Christopher Turner	199	13.70
Ward 5
Lance Brown	1,106	49.64
Jennifer Back (X)	770	34.56
Tracy McGarry	352	15.80

== Uxbridge ==
The following are the preliminary results for the Town of Uxbridge.

=== Mayor ===
2018 Uxbridge Mayoral election
- October 22, 2018
	DB	PM
Candidate	Dave Barton	Patrick Molloy
Popular vote	5,325	2,407
Percentage	63.01%	28.47%
Mayor before election
Patrick Molloy
Elected mayor
Dave Barton

Mayor Patrick Molloy, who was appointed to the position after the appointment of Gerri Lynn O'Connor as Regional Chair, was defeated by former Ward 3 Councillor Dave Barton.

Candidate	Vote	%
Dave Barton	5,325	63.01
Patrick Molloy (X)	2,406	28.47
Diane Reilly	720	8.52

=== Regional Councillor ===
Map of Uxbridge's five wards

One Regional Councillor was elected.

Candidate	Vote	%
Gord Highet	4,315	53.70
Michelle Viney	3,721	46.30

=== Local Councillors ===
Five Local Councillors were elected in 1 of 5 wards.

Candidate	Vote	%
Ward 1
Pamela Beach (X)	832	53.47
Amanda Brannigan	724	46.53
Ward 2
Gary Ruona (X)	709	39.90
Gordon Shreeve	629	35.40
Ted Eng	439	24.70
Ward 3
Bruce Garrod	797	56.61
John Haddock	383	27.20
Logan O'Connor	228	16.19
Ward 4
Willie Popp	1,126	51.18
Fred Bryan (X)	814	37.00
Tamara Williamson	260	11.82
Ward 5
Todd Snooks	586	41.50
Angela Horne	290	20.54
Tammy Murphy	242	17.14
Roger Varley	232	16.43
Blair Emmerson	62	4.39

== Whitby ==
The following are the preliminary results for the Town of Whitby.

For the 2018 election, Whitby gained one regional councillor.

=== Mayor ===
2018 Whitby Mayoral election
- October 22, 2018
	DM	AK
Candidate	Don Mitchell	Andrea Kennedy
Popular vote	16,464	6,689
Percentage	71.11%	28.89%
Mayor before election
Don Mitchell
Elected mayor
Don Mitchell

Mayor Don Mitchell won re-election.

Candidate	Vote	%
Don Mitchell (X)	16,464	71.11
Andrea Kennedy	6,689	28.89

=== Regional Councillors ===
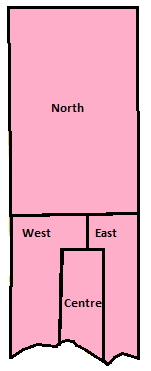
Map of Whitby's four wards

Four Regional Councillors were elected.

Candidate	Vote	%
Elizabeth Roy (X)	12,257	16.44
Chris Leahy	11,210	15.04
Steve Yamada	10,404	13.96
Rhonda Mulcahy	8,545	11.46
Terry Johnston	8,055	10.80
Derrick Gleed (X)	7,259	9.74
Christine Winters	6,852	9.19
John Dolstra	5,786	7.76
Rod Thwaites	2,132	2.86
Chudi Asidianya	2,051	2.75

=== Local Councillors ===
Four Local Councillors were elected in 1 of 4 wards.

Candidate	Vote	%
Ward 1 North
Steve Lee	2,624	54.98
Bill Windrem	1,316	27.57
Sharmila Saigaonkar	833	17.45
Ward 2 West
Deidre Newman	2,540	39.24
Matt Cardwell	2,435	37.62
Kimberly Zeppieri	738	11.40
Meredith Dodge	413	6.38
Tracy Roulston	347	5.36
Ward 3 Centre
Joanne Alexander	1,551	34.19
Michael Emm (X)	1,538	33.90
Bob Baker	1,242	27.37
Dave Sansom	206	4.54
Ward 4 East
Maleeha Shahid	2,015	30.23
Liam Nichols	1,314	19.71
Paul Johnston	1,147	17.21
Carleen Blissett	1,086	16.29
Chris Jones	740	11.10
Sharon Peters	364	5.46
