= List of mayors of Oshawa =

This is a list of mayors of Oshawa, Ontario, from its incorporation as a town in 1879 until the present day.

== Town of Oshawa ==
- William Henry Gibbs - 1879
- F. Rae - 1880–87
- John Cowan - 1887
- Robert McGee - 1887–89
- W.F. Cowan - 1889–96
- W.J. Hare - 1897
- Frederick Luther Fowke - 1898
- Robert McLaughlin - 1899
- Frederick Luther Fowke - 1900–06
- Thomas Erlin Kaiser - 1907–08
- R.H. James - 1909
- W. E. N. Sinclair - 1910–11
- Jno. Gibson - 1912
- E.S. Edmondson - 1913–14
- W. E. N. Sinclair - 1915
- Gordon Daniel Conant - 1916–17
- F.L. Mason - 1918
- John Stacey - 1919–21
- W. J. Trick - 1922–23

== City of Oshawa ==
- W.J. Trick - 1924
- Herbert Schell - 1925
- Robert Preston - 1926–28
- T.B. Mitchell - 1929–30
- Ernest Marks - 1931
- P.A. Macdonald - 1932
- W. E. N. Sinclair - 1933–35
- John Stacey - 1936
- Alex Hall - 1937
- Alex McLeese - 1938
- J.A. Coleman - 1939
- J.C. Anderson - 1940–41
- W.H. Gifford - 1942–43
- A.G. Davis - 1944
- W.H. Gifford - 1945
- Frank McCallum - 1946–48
- Michael Starr - 1949–52
- John Naylor - 1953–54
- Norman Down - 1955
- John Naylor - 1956–57
- Lyman Gifford - 1958–60
- Christine Thomas - 1961–62
- Lyman Gifford - 1963–66
- Ernest Marks - 1967–68
- Hayward Murdoch - 1969
- Bruce Mackey - 1970
- Edward McNeely - 1971–73
- James Potticary - 1973–81
- Allan Pilkey - 1981–90
- Allan J. Mason - 1990–91
- Nancy Diamond - 1991–2003
- John Gray - 2003–10
- John Henry - 2010–18
- Dan Carter - 2018–2026
- Tito-Dante Marimpieteri - 2026–present
