= 2006 Oshawa municipal election =

The Oshawa municipal election, 2006 was held in Oshawa, Ontario, Canada, concurrently with other municipal elections throughout the province, to elect the members of Oshawa City Council.

== Mayoral race ==
Candidate	Vote	%
John Gray (X)	19545	72.8
Alexander Kemp	5846	21.8
Dawn Turner	1461	5.4

== City council ==
Candidate	Vote	%
Ward 1 & 3
Maryanne Sholdra	1590	
Doug Bain	1355	
Dave Thompson	1343	
Kyle Nicholson	1016	
Tim Dobson	673	
Doug Hawkins	366	
Ward 2 & 4
Tito-Dante Marimpietri (X)	4873	
Johnny Milosh	3331	
Ward 5 & 6
Louise Parkes (X)	3999	
John Burns	1727	
Robert Goheen	1183	
David Chyznak	1106	
Michael Kettela	156	

City and regional council

Candidate	Vote	%
Ward 1
Brian Nicholson (X)	1292	
Gord Vickers	1177	
Yoge Patel	93	
Ward 2
Robert Lutczyk (X)	1134	
Doug Ross	1024	
Lanny Joseph	822	
David Purdy	247	
Murray Strong	174	
Ward 3
Nester Pidwerbecki (X)	2644	
Mike Nicholson (X)	1185	
Ward 4
Joseph Kolodzie (X)	3137	
Pauline Beal	1087	
John Rzeszut	402	
Ward 5
John Henry	2201	
Cathy Clarke (X)	1852	
Lynne Marie McCarthy	576	
Ward 6
April Cullen (X)	1601	
Bruce Smith	1332	
Douglas Terwillegar	492	
Ward 7
John Neal (X)	2169	
Steven Gamsby	956	
Mary Jo Cunha	113	
