= Don Mitchell (politician) =

Canadian politician

Mayor of Whitby, Ontario
- In office December 1, 2014 – November 15, 2022
- Preceded by: Pat Perkins
- Succeeded by: Elizabeth Roy

Personal details
- Born: 1951 (age 74–75) Brooklin, Ontario
- Spouse: Liz
- Children: 2
- Occupation: lawyer, businessman

M. Donald Mitchell (born 1951) is a Canadian politician. He was the mayor of Whitby, Ontario from 2014 to 2022. As mayor, he also sat on Durham Regional Council.

== Early life ==
Mitchell was born and raised in Brooklin, Ontario, a rural community within Whitby. He was educated at Meadowcrest Public School and Anderson Collegiate Vocational Institute, and has a bachelor's degree from Trent University and a law degree from Queen's University. After graduating, he practised law for seven years, before taking over the family's lumber business, Mitchell Lumber. Mitchell is an active sportsman, especially in lacrosse. He was a member of the 1976 Brooklin Redmen, and his 1970 junior lacrosse team was inducted into the Whitby Sports Hall of Fame.

== Career ==
Mitchell was first elected to Whitby Town Council in 1991. He represented Whitby's North Ward for until 2003, when he ran unsuccessfully for a seat on Durham Regional Council. He was elected to Durham Regional Council in 2006, and served concurrently as a Town Councillor. While on council, he often butted-heads with mayor Pat Perkins, and announced his intentions to run against her in the 2014 mayoral election. Perkins had other plans though, deciding to run in a by-election for Whitby—Oshawa's seat in the House of Commons, opening the door wide open for Mitchell. Mitchell was easily elected, winning 73% of the vote. Mitchell ran for re-election in 2018 on a platform of "strong progress on council, local jobs and prosperity, vibrant downtowns, walkable neighbourhoods, and improved customer service." Mitchell was easily re-elected winning 71% of the vote, defeating Andrea Kennedy, his former executive advisor who won 29% of the vote. As mayor, one of Mitchell's top priorities was tackling climate change. Whitby was the first municipality in Durham Region to declare a climate emergency.

Mitchell's final term as mayor was marked by "inter-council strife", which was highlighted when councillor Rhonda Mulcahy accused councillor Chris Leahy of insulting her during a live council meeting. Mulcahy also accused Mitchell of inappropriate behaviour in private, including making "sexual innuendos about a female member of staff on their knees" and assaulting her by giving her an unwelcome should massage at a public event.

He did not run for re-election in 2022.
