= R. S. McLaughlin Collegiate and Vocational Institute =

R.S. McLaughlin Collegiate and Vocational Institute

Location
- 570 Stevenson Road North; Oshawa, Ontario, L1J 5P1; Canada; 43.9077°N 78.8907°W

Information
- School type: Public
- School board: Durham District School Board
- Principal: Jacqueline Crosby
- Grades: 9-12
- Enrolment: 1,250 (2024/2025)
- Language: English & French
- Colours: Blue and Yellow
- Mascot: Trojans
- Website: www.ddsb.ca/school/rsmclaughlin

R.S. McLaughlin Collegiate and Vocational Institute—also known as MCVI— is a secondary school located in Oshawa, Ontario within the Durham District School Board.

== Academics ==
Named after Robert Samuel McLaughlin, the school offers a variety of classes including science, math, art, English, music, French, history, geography, and more. The school also offers French immersion classes for students who graduated from a French immersion school in grade eight.

== Incidents ==
On January 3, 2012, during the 2011/2012 Winter Holidays, the school had a fire inside the gymnasium. The damage was 'just over $1 million'. This caused the school's original plans to have the 50th anniversary in May, to be pushed back several months, but classes still resumed on January 9. On February 23, 2012, the school had another fire in one of the boys' washrooms.

== Notable alumni ==
- Ian D. Clark (born 1950), actor
- Bobby Orr (born 1948), professional ice hockey defenceman
- John Henry (born 1960), Mayor of Oshawa from 2010 to 2018

== See also ==
- Education in Ontario
- List of secondary schools in Ontario
