= 1991 Ontario municipal elections =

The 1991 Ontario municipal elections were held on November 12, 1991, to elect mayors, reeves, councillors, and school trustees in all municipalities across Ontario. Some communities also held referendum questions.

The most closely watched contest was in Toronto, where June Rowlands defeated Jack Layton for the mayoralty.

== Results ==
=== Elected mayors and reeves ===
- Ajax: Jim Whitty
- Ancaster: Robert Wade
- Aurora: John West
- Barrie: Janice Laking
- Belleville: Shirley Langer
- Brampton: Peter Robertson
- Brantford: Bob Taylor
- Brockville: John Doran
- Burlington: Walter Mulkewich
- Caledon: Norm Calder
- Cambridge: Jane Brewer
- Chatham: Bill Erickson
- Cornwall: Ron Martelle
- Cumberland: Brian Coburn (details)
- Dundas: John Addison
- East York: David Johnson
- Elliot Lake: George Farkouh
- Etobicoke: Bruce Sinclair
- Flamborough: Don Granger
- Fort Erie: John Teal
- Georgina: Robert Johnston
- Gloucester: Claudette Cain (details)
- Grimsby: Nick Andreychuck
- Guelph: John Counsell (details)
- Haldimand: Marie Trainer
- Halton Hills: Russell Miller
- Hamilton: Bob Morrow (details)
- Kanata: Merle Nicholds (details)
- Kingston: Helen Cooper
- Kingston (Township): Isabel Turner
- Kitchener: Dom Cardillo
- London: Tom Gosnell
- Markham: Anthony Roman
- Milton: Gordon Krantz
- Mississauga: Hazel McCallion
- Nanticoke: Rita Kalmbech
- Nepean: Ben Franklin (details)
- Newcastle: Diane Hamre
- Newmarket: Ray Twinney
- Niagara Falls: Wayne Thomson
- North Bay: Stan Lawlor
- North York: Mel Lastman
- Oakville: Ann Mulvale
- Orillia: Clayt French
- Oshawa: Nancy Diamond
- Ottawa: Jacquelin Holzman (details)
- Owen Sound: Ovid Jackson
- Peterborough: Jack Doris
- Pickering: Wayne Arthurs
- Port Colborne: Bob Saracino
- Richmond Hill: Bill Bell
- Sarnia-Clearwater: Mike Bradley
- Sault Ste. Marie: Joe Fratesi
- Scarborough: Joyce Trimmer
- St. Catharines: Joe McCaffery
- Stoney Creek: Bob Hodgson
- Stratford: Dave Hunt
- St. Thomas: Steve Peters
- Sudbury: Jim Gordon
- Thunder Bay: David Hamilton
- Timmins: Vic Power
- Toronto: June Rowlands (details)
- Valley East: John Robert
- Vanier: Guy Cousineau (details)
- Vaughan: Lorna Jackson
- Waterloo: Brian Turnbull
- Welland: Dick Reuter
- Whitby: Tom Edwards
- Windsor: Mike Hurst
- Woodstock: Margaret Munnoch
- Woolwich: Bob Waters
- York: Fergy Brown

=== Toronto ===
1991 Toronto municipal election: Mayor of Toronto
| Candidate | Votes | % |
|---|---|---|
| June Rowlands | 113,993 | 58.53 |
| Jack Layton | 64,044 | 32.88 |
| Susan Fish | 8,123 | 4.17 |
| Don Andrews | 1,968 | 1.01 |
| Jim Harris | 1,760 | 0.90 |
| Ken Campbell | 1,708 | 0.88 |
| Joe Young | 1,196 | 0.61 |
| William McKeown | 1,023 | 0.53 |
| Ben Kerr | 952 | 0.49 |
| Total valid votes | 194,767 | 100.00 |
