= Elizabeth Roy =

Canadian politician

Her Worship Elizabeth Roy

Mayor of Whitby
- Incumbent
- Assumed office November 15, 2022
- Preceded by: Don Mitchell

Durham Regional Councillor
- Incumbent
- Assumed office December 1, 2014
- Preceded by: Don Mitchell (continued as mayor)
- Succeeded by: Maleeha Shahid (regional councillor seat)
- Constituency: Whitby

Whitby Town Councillor
- In office December 1, 2006 – December 1, 2014
- Preceded by: Mark J. McKinnon
- Succeeded by: Chris Leahy
- Constituency: West Ward

Personal details
- Born: c. 1966 (age 59–60)
- Party: Independent
- Other political affiliations: Ontario Liberal
- Children: 3
- Occupation: Politician; medical radiation therapist

Elizabeth J. Roy (born c. 1966) is a Canadian politician. She has served as mayor of Whitby since 2022. As mayor, she also sits on Durham Regional Council.

== Early life ==
Roy was born to a family of five, and served as student council president at her high school. She moved to Whitby in 1993. Prior to becoming mayor, Roy worked as a medical radiation therapist at the Princess Margaret Hospital from 1988 to 2005 and then at the Durham Regional Cancer Centre. She served as a trustee on the Durham District School Board from 1997 to 2006. She was first elected to Whitby Town Council in the 2006 municipal elections, representing the town's West Ward. She replaced Mark McMcKinnon who did not run for re-election. She was re-elected to that position in 2010.

== Provincial politics ==
In the 2011 Ontario general election, Roy ran for the Ontario Liberal Party in Whitby—Oshawa, losing to incumbent Progressive Conservative candidate Christine Elliott by close to 7,500 votes. When Elliot resigned her seat in 2015, Roy ran in the subsequent by-election held the following year. She was the only candidate to put their name up for the Liberal nomination. She ran on a platform of new and modern infrastructure, better classrooms and better quality health care facilities. Despite an endorsement by Prime Minister Justin Trudeau who visited the riding to help her out, she ended up losing by over 8,000 votes to fellow councillor Lorne Coe who was running for the conservatives. The sale of Hydro One by the provincial Liberal government and the state of health care in the province were the main issues of the campaign.

== Regional council ==
Roy was first elected to Regional Council in 2014, serving co-currently on Town Council. She won the most votes out of all candidates for the three-seat position, ahead of incumbents Lorne Coe and Joe Drumm who were also elected. She was re-elected to regional and town council in 2018, once again topping the poll. She ran on a platform of "investment and redevelopment that will serve the purpose of employment", "address congestion, road safety, alternate modes of moving residents around" and expansion of health care. She cited creation of jobs and affordable housing as the top two issues of the campaign.

During the COVID-19 pandemic in Ontario, Roy worked at Lakeridge Health Oshawa, continuing her job as a radiation therapist in addition to her council duties.

Roy's final term as a Town Councillor was filled with "inter-council strife", which was highlighted when fellow councillor Rhonda Mulcahy accused councillor Chris Leahy of insulting her during a live council meeting. Mulcahy also accused mayor Don Mitchell and his allies of inappropriate behaviour in private. On the divided council, Roy sided with Mulcahy, while mayor Mitchell sided with Leahy, as well as Deirdre Newman, who filed a motion to end the investigation into Mitchell's behaviour.

== Mayor ==
Roy decided to run for mayor of Whitby in the 2022 mayoral election. Mitchell did not run for re-election, but councillor Newman did run against Roy. Roy defeated Newman by over 3,000 votes. During the election, Roy opposed the Strong Mayors, Building Homes Act "strong mayor" legislation passed by the provincial government. She ran on a platform of community beautification, economic development, fighting for a new hospital, and a culture of respect on council.

As mayor, Roy called on the provincial government to provide funding for building a new hospital in the community.
