= Dan Carter (Canadian politician) =

Canadian politician

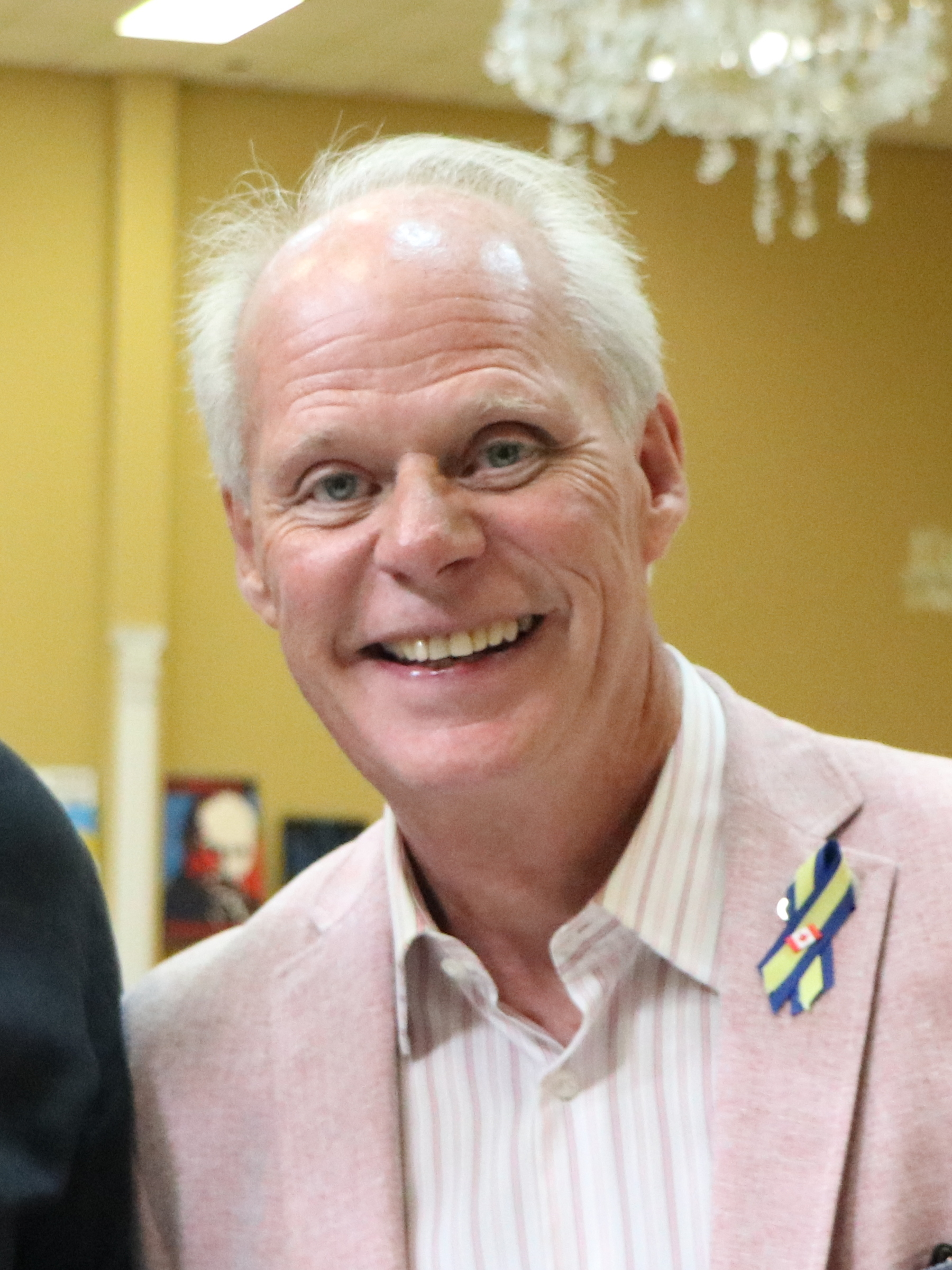
- Carter in 2022

Mayor of Oshawa
- In office December 1, 2018 – November 15, 2026
- Preceded by: John Henry
- Succeeded by: Tito-Dante Marimpietri

Durham Region Councillor
- In office 2014–2018

Personal details
- Party: Independent
- Profession: Politician; broadcaster

Dan Carter is a Canadian politician who served as the mayor of Oshawa from 2018 to 2026. Elected in the 2018 municipal election, he succeeded John Henry on December 1, 2018. He was re-elected in 2022.

== Background ==
Carter campaigned on the theme that his background gave him special insight into how to manage the city's social and economic problems. He struggled with severe dyslexia as a child, leaving him functionally illiterate, and was sexually abused by a stranger at age 8. After his older brother Michael was killed in a motorcycle accident when Carter was 13, he fell into drug and alcohol addiction, and was homeless for most of his late teens and 20s, but when his sister Maureen gave him an ultimatum at age 31 that it was time for him to either sober up or die, he entered rehab and began to rebuild his life.

He went onto a successful career in broadcasting, becoming executive producer of programming for the city's CHEX-TV, as well as serving as a motivational speaker on topics including leadership, challenges of living in poverty, mental health and addiction.

== Political career ==
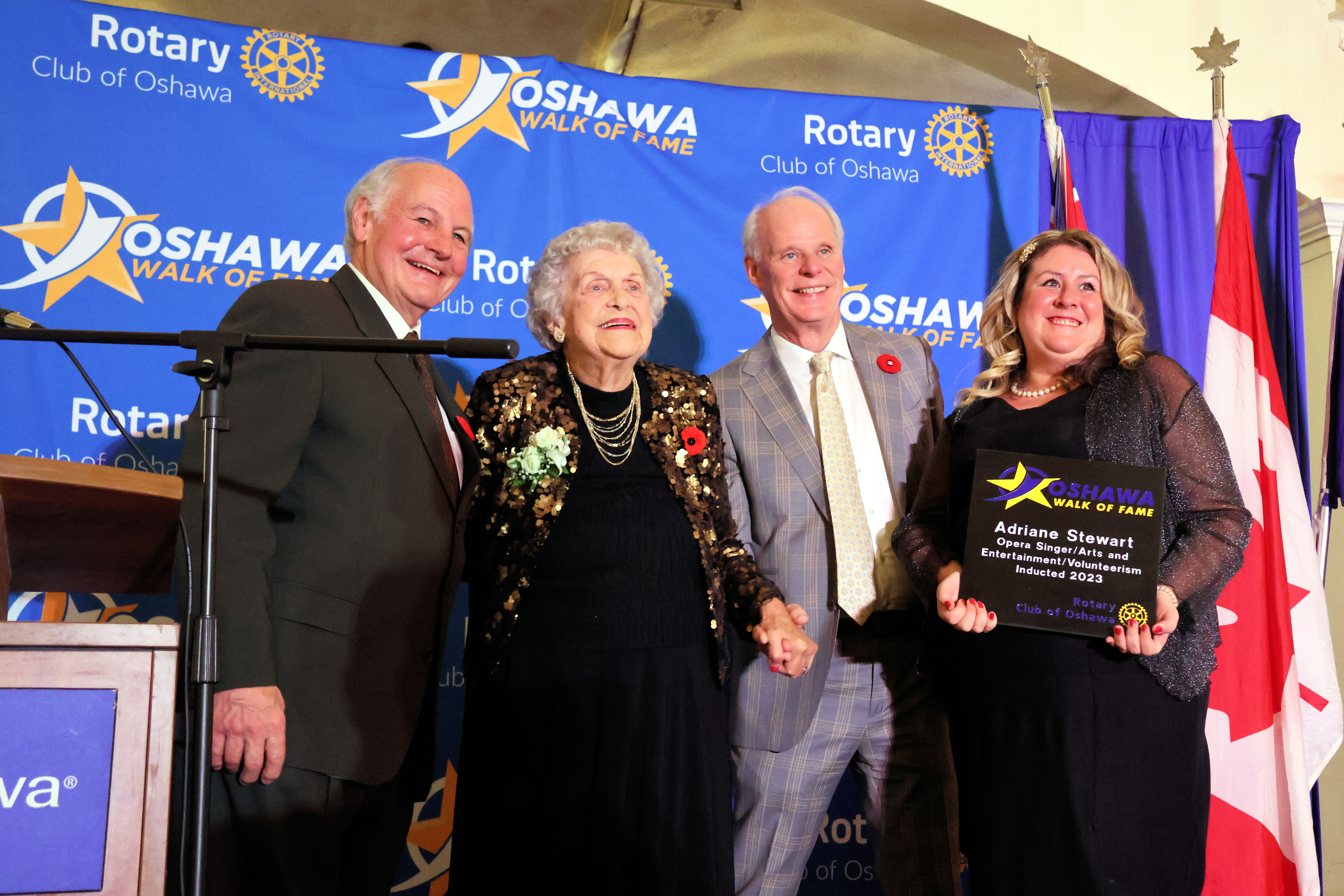
Carter (centre-right) at the 2023 Oshawa Walk of Fame Gala Dinner

In the 2014 municipal election, Carter was elected to a regional council seat. He served as vice-chair of the city's finance committee under Nancy Diamond, and ascended to chair after Diamond's death in 2017. His campaign pledges in that election included the creation of an angel fund to provide financial assistance to new business startups, as part of a comprehensive economic diversification strategy.

He won the mayoral election in 2018 with 69 per cent of the vote. One of his main campaign themes in the mayoral election was improving access to health and social services in the city, in light of its ongoing crises with homelessness and opioid addiction.

== Electoral record ==
Oshawa Mayoral Election (2022)
Candidate	Vote	%
Dan Carter	14,270	64.94
Sara Lear	4,748	21.61
Joe Ingino	2,956	13.45

Oshawa Mayoral Election (2018)
Candidate	Vote	%
Dan Carter	17,651	69.35
Sara Lear	2,899	11.39
Joe Ingino	1,409	5.54
Bob Rutherford	1,083	4.26
Adam Kunz	1,060	4.16
Kenneth Carruthers	983	3.86
Rosaldo Russo	367	1.44
