= Roger Anderson (politician) =

Canadian politician (1953–2018)

Chair of the Regional Municipality of Durham
- In office 1997 – March 24, 2018
- Preceded by: Jim Witty
- Succeeded by: Gerri-Lynne O'Connor (interim)

Deputy Mayor of Ajax, Ontario
- In office 1991–1997

Regional Councillor, Ajax, Ontario
- In office 1991–1997

Personal details
- Born: March 23, 1953
- Died: March 24, 2018 (aged 65)

Roger M. Anderson (March 23, 1953 – March 24, 2018) was a politician in Ontario, Canada. He was the chair of the Regional Municipality of Durham from 1997 till his death in 2018. He also served as a councillor, regional councillor, and deputy mayor for the town of Ajax.

== Political career ==
In 1997, the Durham Regional Council appointed Anderson as the Chair of the Regional Municipality of Durham. He was re-appointed by the Council in 2000, 2003, 2006 and 2010.

Anderson was elected as the regional chair in the 2014 municipal elections. He was the first elected chair of the region, after Durham residents voted in favour of electing the chair in a 2010 plebiscite.

== Illness and death ==
In November 2016, Anderson announced that he had been diagnosed with stomach cancer. He underwent surgery in March 2017. He died on March 24, 2018, a day after his 65th birthday.
