= Shaun Collier =

10th mayor of Ajax

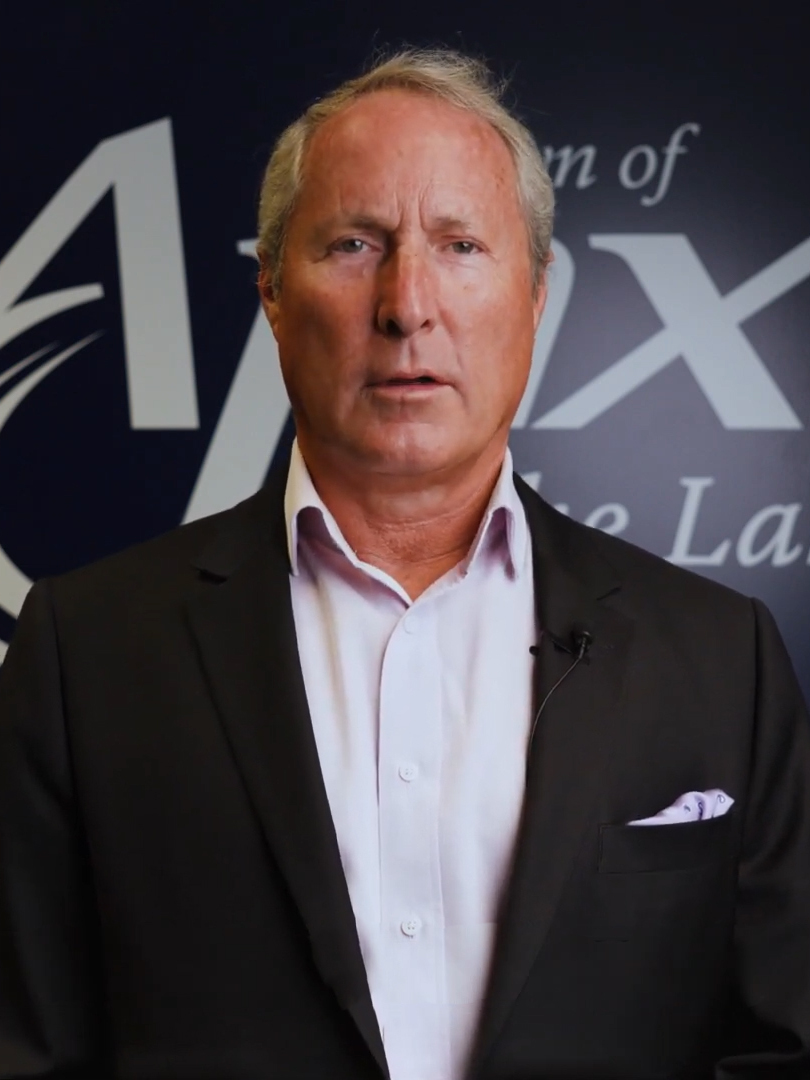
- Collier in 2024

10th Mayor of Ajax
- In office December 1, 2018 – November 15, 2026
- Preceded by: Steve Parish
- Succeeded by: Marilyn Crawford

Personal details
- Party: Progressive Conservative Party of Ontario
- Spouse(s): Carla Collier (-?); Rose Collier
- Education: McMaster University (CDir)
- Profession: Politician; accountant
- Website: Mayor's profile

Shaun Collier is a Canadian politician and former accountant who served as the 10th mayor of Ajax from 2018 to 2026. As mayor, he also served on Durham Regional Council. He was the Chair of the Durham Regional Police Services Board.

== Education ==
Collier has a chartered director degree from McMaster University. Prior to being elected, Collier served in the Canadian Armed Forces and was an accountant.

== Career ==
Collier was first elected to Ajax Town Council in 2003 in ward 1, defeating Ralph Golberg by just 47 votes. In 2010, Collier and his then-fiancée were involved in a boating accident after the boat he had been restoring took on water, and had to be abandoned. In 2007 he ran for the Progressive Conservative Party of Ontario nomination for the riding of Ajax—Pickering, but lost to Kevin Ashe.

Collier was elected to Durham Regional Council in 2010, representing both Ajax wards 1 and 2. He was first elected as mayor in the 2018 municipal election and was the first new mayor of Ajax in 23 years. During his campaign the focus of his platform was on economic development. One of the main issues of the campaign was the proposed enlargement of the Greenbelt which Collier supported, rather than building new homes. He won the election with 43% of the vote, defeating his nearest rival, fellow regional councillor Colleen Jordan, who won 33%. He replaced long-time mayor Steve Parish who did not seek re-election.

While in office as mayor, Collier was fined $13,000 by the Mutual Fund Dealers Association of Canada for allegedly modifying financial documents while he was a mutual funds broker. Collier was subsequently suspended from holding a supervisory role in finance.

Collier endorsed Leslyn Lewis's candidacy in the 2020 Conservative Party of Canada leadership election.

During the COVID-19 pandemic Collier called on the regional health authorities to speed up the process for people seeking to get their second dose of the COVID vaccine.

In 2022, Collier released a statement opposing expanding the urban boundary in Durham Region, which would allow for building new housing on farm land. Despite his opposition, it was passed by Durham Regional Council.

Collier ran for re-election in the 2022 mayoral election on a platform of speeding up the planning process in the city. Collier easily won re-election, winning 62% of the vote, defeating his next nearest rival, teacher Arthur Augustine, who won 19%. Augustine had run against Collier in 2018 as well.
