= Durham Regional Council =

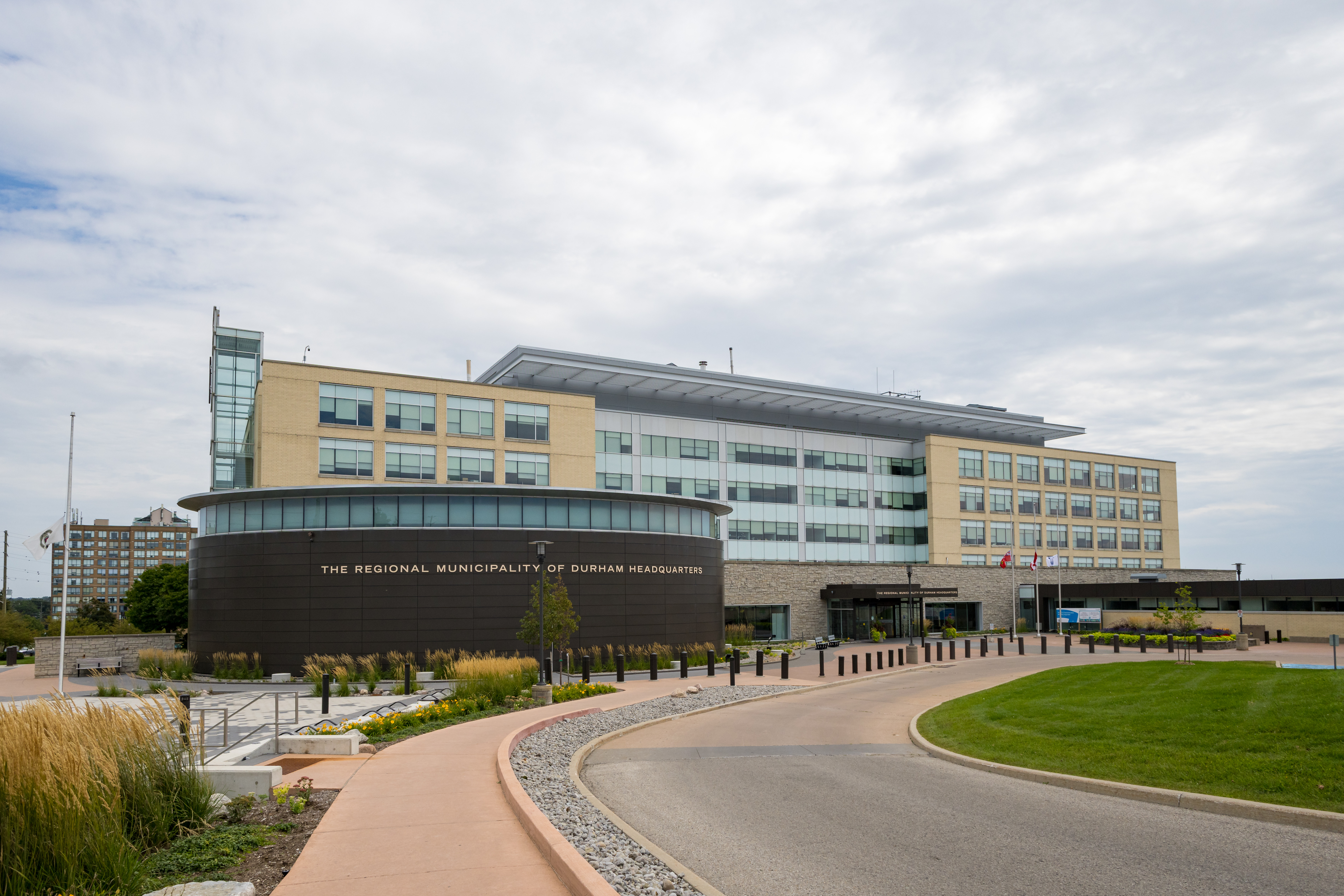
The Durham Region Council is located at the Durham Region Headquarters in Whitby

Durham Regional Council is the political body for the Regional Municipality of Durham in Ontario, Canada. Created in 1974, it consists of 29 elected representatives, including the Regional Chair. Durham Region is governed by Durham Regional Council, which consists of the mayors of the local municipalities and regional councillors directly elected in each municipality. These members are elected via double direct election. Each municipality elects the following number of regional councillors:

- Pickering - 3
- Ajax - 3
- Whitby - 4
- Oshawa - 5
- Clarington - 2
- Uxbridge - 1
- Scugog - 1
- Brock - 1

== Council Structure ==
The council is led by a Regional Chair, who is directly elected by the public. The current Regional Chair is John Henry. In 2006, Pickering, Ajax, and Oshawa placed non-binding referendums on their local election ballots to ask voters whether the chair should be directly elected. Over 80% voted in the affirmative.

The current council was elected in October 2022. Council used to sit for a three-year term, but the Ontario Legislature passed legislation increasing the length of municipal council terms in Ontario to four years.

== Current Council ==
Name	Representing as
John Henry	Regional Chair
Shaun Collier	Mayor of Ajax
Marilyn Crawford	Ajax Regional Councillor
Joanne Dies	Ajax Regional Councillor
Sterling Lee	Ajax Regional Councillor
Michael Jubb	Mayor of Brock
Cria Pettingill	Brock Regional Councillor
Adrian Foster	Mayor of Clarington
Granville Anderson	Clarington Regional Councillor
Willie Woo	Clarington Regional Councillor
Dan Carter	Mayor of Oshawa
Bob Chapman	Oshawa Regional Councillor
Rick Kerr	Oshawa Regional Councillor
Tito-Dante Marimpietri	Oshawa Regional Councillor
John Neal	Oshawa Regional Councillor
Brian Nicholson	Oshawa Regional Councillor
Kevin Ashe	Mayor of Pickering
Maurice Brenner	Pickering Regional Councillor
Linda Cook	Pickering Regional Councillor
David Pickles	Pickering Regional Councillor
Wilma Wotten	Mayor of Scugog
Ian McDougall	Scugog Regional Councillor
Dave Barton	Mayor of Uxbridge
Bruce Garrod	Uxbridge Regional Councillor
Elizabeth Roy	Mayor of Whitby
Chris Leahy	Whitby Regional Councillor
Rhonda Mulcahy	Whitby Regional Councillor
Maleeha Shahid	Whitby Regional Councillor
Steve Yamada	Whitby Regional Councillor

== Regional Committees, Boards, Subcommittees and Task Forces ==
- Durham Region Transit Committees
- Finance & Administration Committee
- Health & Social Services Committee
- Planning & Economic Development Committee
- Works Committee
- 2014 Municipal Election Compliance Audit Committee
- 911 Management Board
- Accessibility Advisory Committee
- Association of Local Public Health Agencies
- Business Advisory Centre Durham
- Canadian National Exhibition Association
- Central Lake Ontario Conservation Authority
- CTC Source Protection Committee
- Development Charges Complaint Committee
- Durham Advisory Committee on Homelessness
- Durham Agricultural Advisory Committee
- Durham Environmental Advisory Committee
- Durham Region Child and Youth Advocate
- Durham Regional Local Housing Corporation
- Durham Region Non-Profit Housing Corporation
- Durham Regional Police Services Board
- Durham Region Roundtable on Climate Change
- East Duffins Headwaters Committee
- Energy from Waste – Waste Management Advisory Committee
- Land Division Committee
- Ganaraska Region Conservation Authority
- Greater Toronto Airports Authority
- Greater Toronto Airports Authority Consultative Committee
- Greater Toronto Marketing Alliance
- GTA Agricultural Action Committee and Golden Horseshoe Food & Farming Alliance
- Kawartha Region Conservation Authority
- Lake Simcoe Region Conservation Authority
- Local Diversity and Immigration Partnership Council
- Royal Agricultural Winter Fair Association
- Toronto and Region Conservation Authority
- TRCA Trail Guidelines Advisory Committee
- Trent Conservation Coalition Source Protection Committee

== Services ==
Services under the region's scope include:

- Children Services
- Community Planning
- Construction
- Corporate Services
- Economic Strategy and Tourism
- Emergency Medical Services - Durham Region EMS - downloaded from the Province of Ontario
- Environmental
- Financial Department
- Forestry
- Housing
- Legal Services
- Long Term Care and Seniors
- Public Health and Safety
- Real Estate
- Planning Services
- Regional Property Taxes
- Tourism
- Transportation Services - regional roads only
- Sewers
- Employment and Financial Support
- Transit - Durham Region Transit
- Water
- Waste management (garbage, recycling, hazardous waste; excludes curbside collection)
- Policing - Durham Regional Police

== Regional Chairs ==
- John Henry 2018–present
- Roger Anderson 1997–2018
- Jim Witty 1995–1997
- Gary Herrema 1980–1995
- Walter Beath 1974–1980

== Durham Regional Headquarters ==
Durham Regional Offices are located at 605 Rossland Road East in Whitby and is also headquarters for Durham Regional Police.
