= Nancy Diamond =

Canadian politician

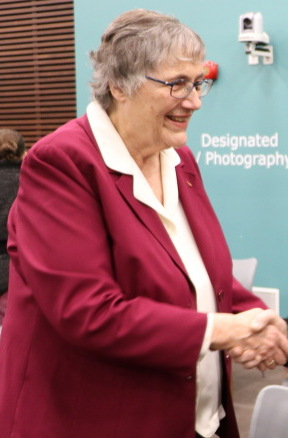
- Diamond at City Hall, 2016

Mayor of Oshawa, Ontario
- In office 1991–2003
- Preceded by: Allan Mason
- Succeeded by: John Gray

Personal details
- Born: 1941 Sudbury, Ontario
- Died: February 12, 2017 (aged 75) Toronto, Ontario
- Spouse: Fred (dec. 2011)
- Children: 1
- Occupation: Administration

Nancy Diamond (1941 – February 12, 2017) was a municipal politician in Ontario, Canada, who served as mayor of Oshawa from 1991 to 2003. Previously she served as a city councillor from 1988 to 1991. In 2010, she returned to council and served as a city and Durham regional councillor until her death in February 2017.

== Background ==
Diamond was born in Sudbury, Ontario, in 1941. She studied economics at Queen's University and worked in university and college administration. Diamond and her husband Fred raised one daughter. Fred died in 2011 after a long illness.

== Politics ==
After running for Oshawa City Council in 1985 and losing by a margin of just seven votes, Diamond won election to council in 1988.

She ran for mayor in the 1991 municipal election, defeating incumbent mayor Allan Mason. Her campaign focused on a controversial downtown redevelopment project championed by Mason, which Diamond dismissed as "unrealistic, unmanageable and unfinanceable." She was not opposed to the redevelopment in principle, and later supported a revised version of the proposal, but objected to several aspects of Mason's proposed financing and implementation plans.

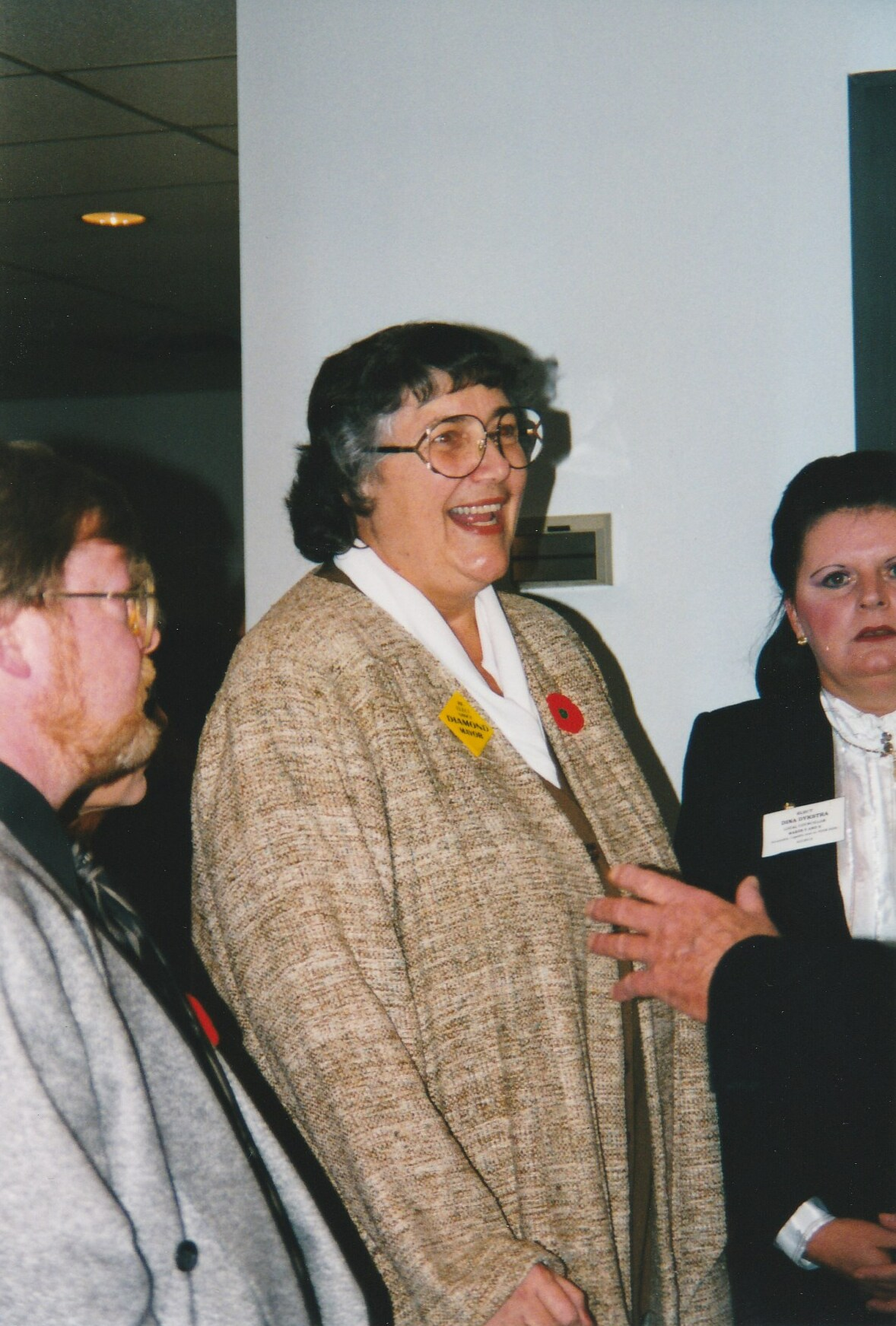
Nancy Diamond as Oshawa Mayor, in the 1990s

One of her first stated goals as mayor was the establishment of a university in the city, a goal which was attained when the University of Ontario Institute of Technology was chartered in 2002. She spearheaded initiatives to improve the city's economy, including convening a panel of area mayors to come up with a plan to save the city's General Motors plant after staffing cutbacks at the company were announced. She lobbied for improvements to the city's transportation network, including the improvement of Ontario Highway 401, the extension of Ontario Highway 407 and the expansion of the Oshawa Airport. She also spearheaded the creation of a city manager position at Oshawa City Hall, and tried to avoid or minimize municipal tax increases.

She was reelected to a second term as mayor in 1994. Priorities during her second term included economic diversification, and the revitalization of the city's struggling downtown core. During this era, she began to attract some controversy for endorsing a plan to amalgamate Oshawa with the neighbouring towns of Whitby and Courtice, and for her handling of an unconfirmed rumour that the board of the Canadian Automotive Museum was planning to move the facility from Oshawa to Toronto.

Diamond was re-elected to a third term as mayor in the 1997 municipal election, and to a fourth term in the 2000 municipal election.

In the 2003 municipal election, Diamond faced allegations that her style as mayor had been abrasive, that her management of the city's downtown revitalization program was failing and that her focus on freezing municipal tax rates was no longer serving the city's changing needs. She was defeated by councillor John Gray.

Diamond returned to municipal politics in the 2010 municipal election, winning election to a dual Oshawa City Council and Durham Regional Council seat, and was reelected in the 2014 municipal election. She died in Toronto on February 12, 2017, at the age of 75 after a brief hospitalization after complaining of feeling unwell.
