= John Gray (Oshawa politician) =

Canadian politician

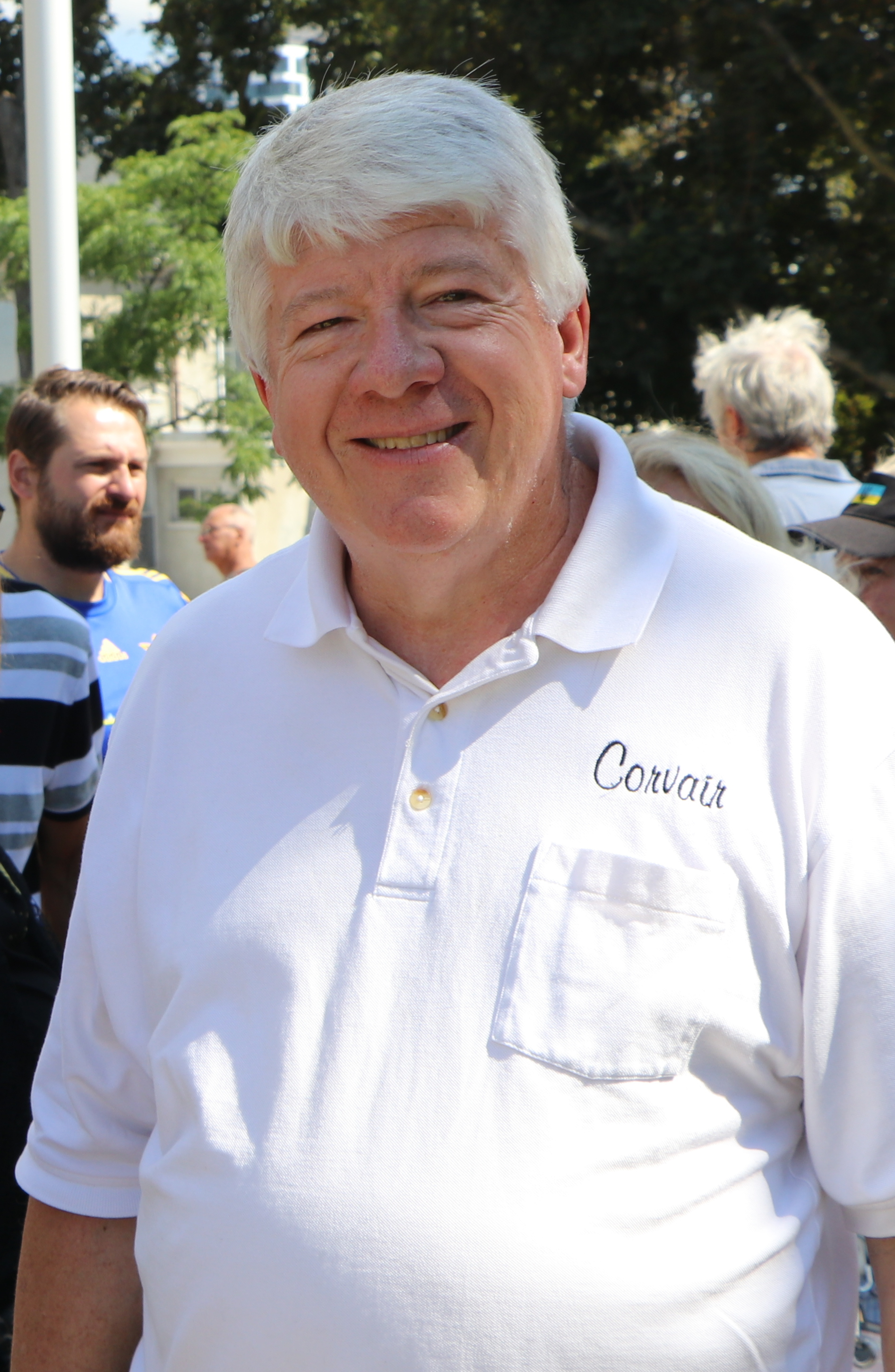
- Gray in 2022

Mayor of Oshawa, Ontario
- In office 2003–2010
- Preceded by: Nancy Diamond
- Succeeded by: John Henry

Councillor Ward 5
- In office 2018–present

Personal details
- Born: March 20, 1959 (age 67) Whitby, Ontario
- Occupation: Consultant

John Gray (born March 20, 1959) is a politician in Ontario, Canada, who is currently the Councillor for Ward 5 in the City of Oshawa. He was formerly a councillor for the city of Oshawa and the Regional Municipality of Durham from 1994 to 2003. Gray then served as mayor of Oshawa from 2003 to 2010.

== Background ==
Gray was raised in Whitby, Ontario. He graduated from Henry Street High School and went on to study financial accounting at Centennial College in Toronto, Ontario. He was employed at ANDEC Manufacturing Ltd. as a financial controller.

== Politics ==
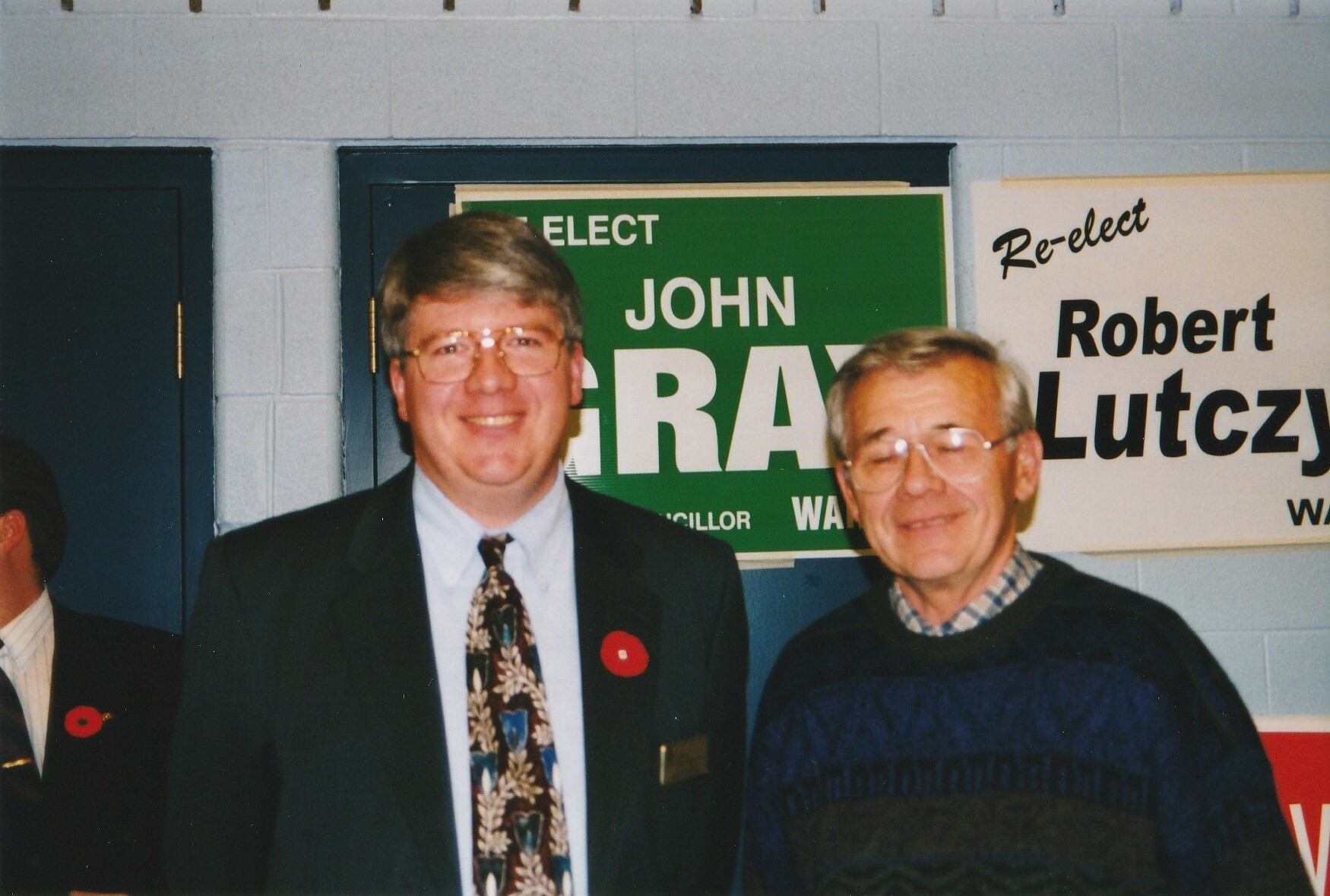
John Gray as councillor, in the 1990s.

Gray served as a Councillor for both the city of Oshawa and the Regional Municipality of Durham for nine years prior to being elected as mayor in November 2003. In 2003 he ran for mayor and defeated four-term incumbent Nancy Diamond leading with 40% of the vote in a five candidate race.

Gray was re-elected for a second term in 2006 but was defeated in 2010 by local businessman, John Henry.

In March 2011, Gray considered an offer to run in the 2011 federal election. He cited family considerations in his decision.

In July 2018, Gray decided to return to municipal politics and announced his candidacy to become a city councillor for Oshawa.

On October 22, 2018, Gray was elected to Oshawa City Council - Ward 5 - in a handily won victory, securing almost 60% of the votes cast. Gray, along with the other successful candidates in the 2018 Oshawa Municipal Election, were sworn in on December 3, 2018.

On October 24, 2022, Gray was re-elected to Oshawa City Council for Ward 5.
