= John Henry (Ontario politician) =

Canadian politician

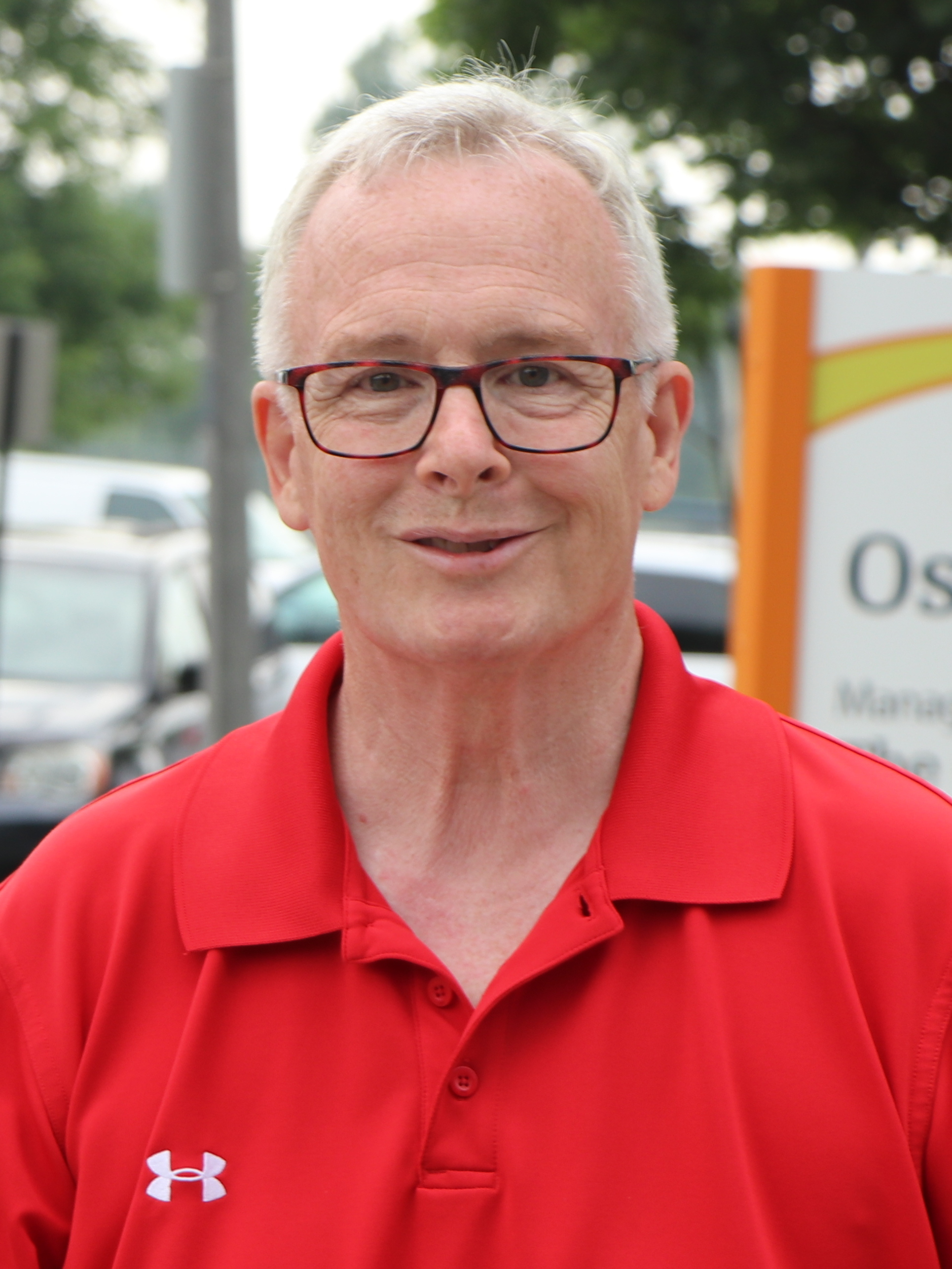
- Henry in 2023

Chair of Durham Regional Municipality
- In office December 5, 2018 – November 15, 2026
- Preceded by: Gerri-Lynne O'Connor (interim)
- Succeeded by: Kevin Ashe

Mayor of Oshawa, Ontario
- In office December 1, 2010 – November 30, 2018
- Preceded by: John Gray
- Succeeded by: Dan Carter

Councillor, Ward 5, Oshawa, Ontario
- In office 2006–2010
- Preceded by: Cathy Clarke
- Succeeded by: Position abolished (Note: Oshawa voted in 2007 to change councillor elections from a ward system to an at-large system.)

Personal details
- Born: July 30, 1960 (age 66) Oshawa, Ontario, Canada
- Profession: Business Owner

John G. Henry (born July 30, 1960) is a politician in Ontario, Canada. He was mayor of Oshawa from 2010 to 2018 and chair of the Regional Municipality of Durham from 2018 to 2026.

== Background ==
Henry was born in Oshawa. The son of General Motors workers, he attended RS McLaughlin CVI High School. Henry is a graduate of Durham College, George Brown College and Panasonic's Corporate School. Henry trained as an Industrial Fire Fighter at the Louisiana State University, Ice Rescue Specialist at the Rochester Police Academy, Dive Rescue Specialist, Level 1 at the University of Michigan. Henry represented Canada at the First International Dive Rescue Program at the University of Colorado.

He is the owner of Office Products and Services, an Oshawa company serving Durham Region and the GTA.

== City Councillor ==
Henry ran for the position of Oshawa councillor Ward 5 in 2003 but was defeated by incumbent Cathy Clarke by 734 votes. He tried again in 2006 this time defeating her by 349 votes. His campaign focused on city hall accountability, developing new sources of revenue and managing spending.

In 2007, Oshawa council voted to do away with the ward system that had been in place since 1985. Henry voted to return the election to a system of electing councillors at-large, which had been the historical system from 1933 to 1985. The vote was a result of a referendum held the previous year where a majority of voters preferred the old system. Henry said, "I'm not prepared to say people's vote doesn't matter...anything short of supporting this would be an insult to the residents of this city."

During his time as councillor, Henry unlike other councillors paid for his municipal expenses out of his own pocket.

== Mayor of Oshawa ==
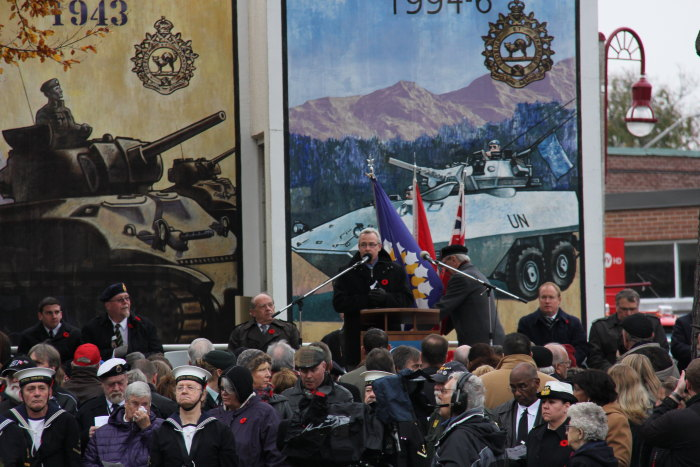
Henry speaking at a Remembrance Day ceremony as Mayor, in 2013.

In 2010, Henry ran for Mayor of Oshawa. He defeated the incumbent John Gray by 6,295 votes. There was widespread dissatisfaction with Gray's record including his decision to drive a taxpayer funded vehicle, a 2010 Camaro SS and for approving use of city funds to pay MBA education expenses for his executive assistant and another councillor. Due to Henry's expense policy for his election campaign and his previous councillor work he was dubbed "Rob Ford East" by the Toronto Sun.

On September 3, 2013, a raucous council meeting resulted in two members of the public being arrested. The issue being discussed at the meeting was a report by the city's auditor general about a real estate deal. When city security staff tried to deal with them, a struggle ensued. Undercover Durham Regional Police officers who were also sitting in the room then arrested two men and charged them with assault. The charges against them and the security men involved were all withdrawn at a later date.

In April 2015, the Supreme Court of Canada ruled that reciting the Lord's Prayer in a Quebec municipal council meeting violated that province's Charter of Rights. While several cities outside of Quebec also decided to discontinue the practice, Henry said that it would continue in Oshawa, despite constitutional opinions that said the ruling likely also applied to the Canadian Charter of Rights and Freedoms. Henry said, "We ask that people please join in the Lord's Prayer or take a moment of reflection... I am open to debate, but in the meantime at the next council meeting we will continue with the practice." A recent Ontario Ombudsman investigation found Henry had "illegal meetings", this "shameful" decision was well documented in all local newspapers like Oshawa this week and Oshawa express."

== Legal issues ==
On April 25, 2018, Oshawa residents Jeff Davis and former mayoral candidate Lou DeVuono delivered documents to the DRPS downtown station highlighting what they say is evidence of criminal wrongdoing at city hall, particularly in connection to a much maligned land purchase in 2013 for a new city works depot at 199 Wentworth Street East.

An initial investigator was given a computer at city hall complete with an F Drive that contained the information and reports that would be relevant to his investigation. In a recent Freedom of Information request for the drive the city claimed the drive had been deleted.
