= List of mayors of Pickering, Ontario =

This is a list of mayors, reeves and clerks of the City of Pickering, Ontario, Canada.

== Town clerks (1811-1849) ==
During the early days of Pickering Township the Town Clerk was the town officer with the most authority.

Term	Town Clerk
1811 – 1822	Thomas Hubbard
1823 – 1835	William Sleigh
1836 – 1839	James Sharrard
1840 – 1843	Joseph Wilson
1844 – 1848	George Barclay
1849	Hector Beaton^{1}

Note

1. Hector Beaton was appointed as collector in 1836 and by 1849 he was filling three roles (assessor, collector and clerk). He remained in the role of Town Clerk until 1883, at which point his son Donald R. Beaton filled the roll until 1944.

== Reeves (1850-1873) ==
Following the Municipal Corporations Act of 1849, Reeves became part of the Pickering leadership. The first meeting of Pickering Council following the Act was held on January 21, 1850, at Thompson's Inn, located south of Brougham.

Term	Reeve
1850 - 1852	William Henry Michell
1853 - 1854	John MacVeigh Lumsden Truman P. White
1855 - 1856	John MacVeigh Lumsden
1857 - 1864	Truman P. White^{1}
1865	James McCreight
1866	Truman P. White
1867 - 1868	James McCreight
1869 - 1874	Truman P. White
1875 - 1876	John Miller
1877	Truman P. White
1878 - 1883	John Miller
1884 - 1887	Joseph Monkhouse
1888	John Miller
1889	Sylvester Mackey
1890	John Miller
1891 - 1892	George Parker
1893 - 1894	Ralph R. Mowbray
1895 - 1896	George Gerow
1897 - 1898	Ralph R. Mowbray
1899 - 1900	William G. Barnes
1901 - 1902	Thomas Poucher
1903	Thomas Beare
1904	James Underhill
1905	James McBrady
1906 - 1907	James Todd
1908 - 1910	John A. White
1911	Ralph R. Mowbray
1912	William George Scott
1913 - 1914	William W. Sparks
1915 - 1916	Elias B. Hoover
1917 - 1918	Ralph R. Mowbray
1918	John Forgie
1919 - 1920	William George Scott
1921 - 1922	Fred H. Richardson
1923 - 1924	John Forgie
1925 - 1926	Adam Spears
1927 - 1929	George M. Forsyth
1930 - 1931	George L. Middleton
1932 - 1934	Ernest L. Chapman
1935 - 1937	Robert C. Reesor
1938 - 1939	Ralph E. Mowbray
1940 - 1944	William Reesor
1945 - 1947	D. Blake Annis
1948 - 1951	William H. Westney
1952 - 1955	George Todd
1956	William G. Newman
1957 - 1958	William G. Lawson
1959 - 1963	John Sherman Scott
1964 - 1967	Clifford Laycox
1968 - 1973	John Williams

Note

1. T.P. White served as Ontario County Warden in 1861.

== Mayors (1974-present) ==
Term	Mayor
1974 - 1977	George Ashe^{1}
1977 - 1988	John E. Anderson^{1}
1988 - 2003	Wayne Arthurs
2003–2022	David Ryan
2022–present	Kevin Ashe

Note

1. George Ashe resigned and was elected to the Ontario Legislature. John Anderson was appointed Mayor following George Ashe's resignation
