= Todd McCarthy (politician) =

Canadian politician

The Honourable Todd McCarthy ECO KC MPP
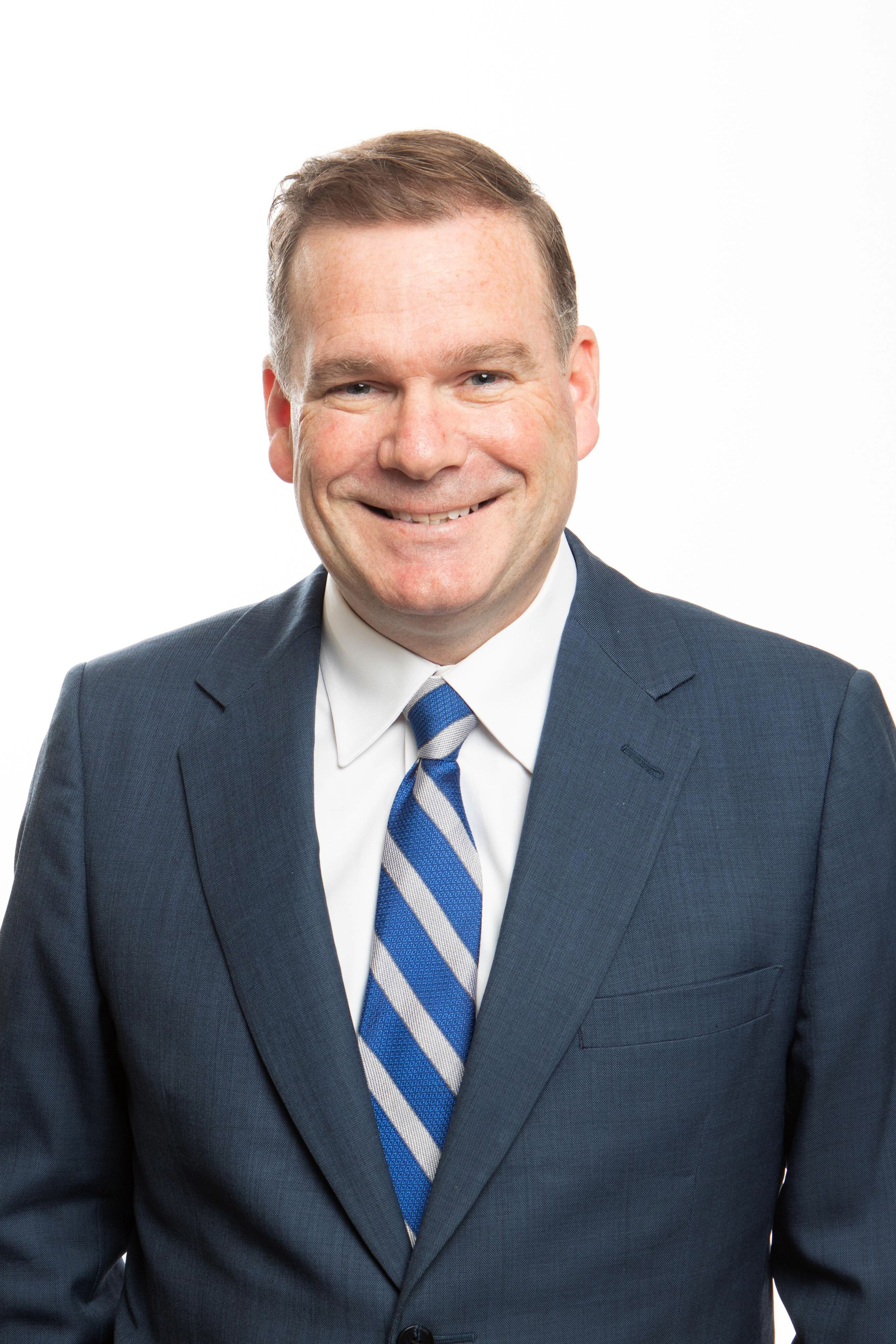
- McCarthy in 2022

Ontario Minister of the Environment, Conservation and Parks
- Incumbent
- Assumed office March 19, 2025
- Premier: Doug Ford
- Preceded by: Andrea Khanjin

Minister of Public and Business Service Delivery and Procurement
- In office September 22, 2023 – March 19, 2025
- Premier: Doug Ford
- Preceded by: Kaleed Rasheed
- Succeeded by: Stephen Crawford

Ontario Associate Minister of Transportation
- In office September 4, 2023 – September 22, 2023
- Premier: Doug Ford
- Preceded by: Stan Cho
- Succeeded by: Vijay Thanigasalam

Member of the Ontario Provincial Parliament for Durham
- Incumbent
- Assumed office June 2, 2022
- Preceded by: Lindsey Park

Personal details
- Born: December 9, 1962 (age 63) Scarborough, Ontario, Canada
- Party: Progressive Conservative
- Spouse: Kathy McCarthy
- Children: 3
- Education: University of Toronto (B.A., 1984); Osgoode Hall Law School (J.D., 1987)
- Occupation: Politician; Lawyer
- Website: toddmccarthympp.ca

Todd J. McCarthy (born December 9, 1962) is a Canadian lawyer and politician who has been the Ontario minister of the environment, conservation and parks since 2025. He was the minister of public and business service delivery and procurement from 2023 to 2025 and briefly, was the associate minister of transportation in 2023. A member of the Progressive Conservative (PC) Party, McCarthy was first elected in the 2022 provincial election to represent Durham in the Legislative Assembly of Ontario.

== Education ==
McCarthy attended Holy Spirit Roman Catholic Elementary School from 1967 to 1976 and went on to Senator O'Connor College School graduating in 1981. He majored in political science at the University of Toronto St. Michael's College earning a Bachelor of Arts degree with Distinction in 1984. He studied law at Osgoode Hall Law School, York University earning a Bachelor of Laws in 1987. After articling and completing the 30th Bar Admission Course, McCarthy was called to the Bar of Ontario in 1989. He went on to practice law as a barrister and solicitor and was a leading trial lawyer throughout the Province of Ontario for 33 years before being elected to Provincial Parliament in June 2022. He was one of the youngest certified Specialists in Civil Litigation when recognized as such in 1996 by the Law Society of Upper Canada as it then was.

== Career ==
McCarthy joined the law firm of what is now Flaherty McCarthy LLP in 1994. The firm was founded that same year by the Late Honourable Jim Flaherty, former Deputy Premier, Christine Elliott and Mr. Justice Grant Dow. In addition to a successful career as a trial and appellate lawyer, McCarthy served as a school board trustee from 1993 to 1997 with the Durham Region Separate School Board. He was elected in 1994, winning by just 3 votes, and served as vice-chair in 1996–1997. From 2002 to 2011, McCarthy served as a deputy judge of the small claims court in Durham Region. McCarthy served as a director at the Canada Revenue Agency. He was also an adjunct professor at Durham College in 2010 and at the Faculty of Law Queen's University from 2011 to 2019. In 2021, he appeared before the House of Commons Justice Committee to address delays in the justice system and proposed solutions. He is a defender of the Right to Trial by Jury in civil cases. McCarthy has written and spoken out extensively both on this subject in 2020 and in 2021 [4] on Canada's unique Constitutional provisions. McCarthy has argued that courts should not hold a monopoly over major policy choices affecting Canadians' rights, emphasizing that democratic decision‑making must remain paramount. He supports the notwithstanding clause as a legitimate mechanism for legislatures to assert the will of the people when judicial interpretations diverge from broadly held public values.

== Awards ==
McCarthy has been recognized as a leading Ontario Lawyer. In 2019, he was recognized as the Defence Honouree of the Year by the Ontario Trial Lawyers Association. In 2021, he received an Insurance Law Award of Excellence from the Ontario Bar Association. His contributions to the Administration of Justice include many articles, lectures and seminars in relation to continuing legal education. McCarthy appeared as Trial Counsel in over 100 jury and non-jury trials throughout Ontario and in numerous appeals before the Ontario Court of Appeal and the Divisional Court. Many of these appearances resulted in precedent setting decisions which have contributed to the development of a significant body of published Case Law.

== Political career ==
McCarthy ran unsuccessfully in 2011 and 2014 to become the Member of Provincial Parliament for the riding of Ajax-Pickering and lost in the riding of Whitby in the 2019 federal election.

In 2021, McCarthy was nominated to be the Progressive Conservative Party of Ontario candidate for Durham. He then went on to win a seat in the riding of Durham the 2022 Ontario general election, winning by over 10,000 votes. He has since been appointed a parliamentary assistant to the president of the Treasury Board, deputy government whip and as a member of the Standing Committee on Public Accounts.

McCarthy briefly served as the Associate Minister of Transportation from September 4 to September 22, 2023 and was later shuffled to be the Minister of Public and Business Service Delivery on September 22, 2023 after the resignation of Kaleed Rasheed.

As Minister of Public and Business Service Delivery and Procurement, McCarthy introduced four pieces of legislation that were passed unanimously by the Legislative Assembly of Ontario within an 11-month period:

1) Bill 142, The Better for Consumers, Better for Businesses Act, 2023 , received Royal Assent on December 6, 2023. This act repealed the Consumer Protection Act, 2002, and replaced it with the Consumer Protection Act, 2023. The new legislation modernizes consumer protection laws, addressing unfair business practices, and enhances transparency in consumer transactions.

2) Bill 153, The Building Infrastructure Safely Act, 2024, received Royal Assent in early 2024. This act amends the Ontario Underground Infrastructure Act, 2012, and introduces new rules for liability, fee collection and locate requests, aiming to improve safety and efficiency in infrastructure projects.

3) Bill 194, The Strengthening Cyber Security and Building Trust in the Public Sector Act, 2024, received Royal Assent in November 2024. This act enhances digital security and trust within Ontario's public sector. It includes provisions for cybersecurity, artificial intelligence governance, and stronger privacy protections for children and youth.

4) Bill 200, The Homeowner Protection Act, 2024, received Royal Assent on June 6, 2024. This act aims to protect homeowners from predatory lending schemes by banning the registration of Notices of Security Interest (NOSI) on land titles. It also introduces a cooling-off period for buyers of new freehold homes.

While serving as the Minister of Public and Business Service Delivery and Procurement, McCarthy acted as Minister of Environment, Conservation and Parks between September 2024 and March 2025. He assumed these duties when Minister, Andrea Khanjin, went on parental leave. On March 19, 2025, McCarthy was sworn in as Minister of the Environment, Conservation and Parks.

He won re-election in the 2025 Ontario general election.

During the 2025 Ontario general election McCarthy reportedly told a potential voter he was canvassing for that a video explaining Doug Ford wanting to open the Greenbelt for development was fake news and may have been created by artificial intelligence.

McCarthy served as Ontario’s Minister of the Environment, Conservation and Parks during a period in which the Ford government emphasized the streamlining of environmental approvals and regulatory requirements, particularly for mining development in the Ring of Fire region. These initiatives were introduced amid the threat of tariffs on Canada during the second Trump Administration. On December 18, 2025, he co-signed the Cooperation Agreement Between Ontario and Canada on Environmental and Impact Assessments joining Premier Doug Ford in Ottawa alongside Prime Minister Mark Carney for a federal–provincial agreement adopting a “One Project, One Process” framework, intended to align and accelerate approval processes for major mining and resource development projects, including those in the Ring of Fire.

McCarthy was appointed Acting Minister of Infrastructure on October 9, 2025 while continuing to serve as Ontario's Minister of Environment Conservation and Parks. This was necessitated by the absence of Minister Kinga Surma while on parental leave.

== Personal life ==
McCarthy was born in Scarborough, Ontario, to Canadian-born parents of Irish Catholic heritage, Mary and John McCarthy. He is one of their three sons. His brother John McCarthy is a judge of the Ontario Superior Court of Justice and his brother Gerry is a member of the Social Security Tribunal of Canada. McCarthy, a Canadian of Irish descent, has frequently spoken on the history and contributions of Irish Canadians. In 2026, he served as the 38th Grand Marshal of the Toronto St. Patrick’s Day Parade.

McCarthy married Kathy Azzopardi on July 25, 1987, at St. Bonaventure Catholic Church. They purchased their first home in Durham Region in 1989. The McCarthys continue to live in Durham Region. Kathy McCarthy recently retired as a psychometrist after 33 years with the Durham Catholic District School Board. The couple have three adult children. Meaghan McCarthy (born in 1992) is a lawyer. Brendan McCarthy (born in 1995) is a story editor at TSN. Jake McCarthy (born in 1998) is a special needs young adult who survived osteosarcoma and is on the autism spectrum.

In July 2025, a man from Burlington was charged after allegedly making death threats against McCarthy.

== Electoral record ==
2025 Ontario general election: Durham
Party	Candidate	Votes	%	±%
Progressive Conservative	Todd McCarthy	26,967	50.48	+4.63
Liberal	Brad Jakobsen	15,701	29.39	+4.50
New Democratic	Chris Borgia	7,635	14.29	–4.30
Green	Sanjin Zeco	1,280	2.40	–1.62
New Blue	James Leventakis	666	1.25	–2.60
Centrist	Asif Khan	635	1.19	–
Ontario Party	Sheri Thurston	409	0.77	–0.63
Independent	Fawad Kiyani	130	0.24	–
Total valid votes		53,423	99.28	
Total rejected, unmarked and declined ballots		389	0.72	+0.23
Turnout		53,812	44.09	+0.38
Eligible voters		122,049		
Progressive Conservative hold		Swing		+0.06
Source: Elections Ontario

2022 Ontario general election: Durham
Party	Candidate	Votes	%	±%
Progressive Conservative	Todd McCarthy	22,614	45.85	–1.14
Liberal	Granville Anderson	12,276	24.89	+8.06
New Democratic	Chris Borgia	9,168	18.59	–13.07
Green	Mini Batra	1,981	4.02	+0.14
New Blue	Spencer Ford	1,898	3.85	–
Independent	Tony Stravato	697	1.41	–
Ontario Party	Lou Devuono	686	1.39	–
Total valid votes		49,320	99.51	
Total rejected, unmarked and declined ballots		242	0.49	–0.50
Turnout		49,562	43.71	–16.23
Eligible voters		113,389		
Progressive Conservative hold		Swing		–4.60
Source: Elections Ontario

2019 Canadian federal election: Whitby
Party	Candidate	Votes	%	±%	Expenditures
Liberal	Ryan Turnbull	30,182	43.7	-1.25	$90,618.58
Conservative	Todd McCarthy	24,564	35.5	-6.59	$114,623.57
New Democratic	Brian Dias	9,760	14.1	+3.75	$6,319.41
Green	Paul Slavchenko	3,735	5.4	+3.23	$28,189.54
People's	Mirko Pejic	860	1.2		$3,185.65
Total valid votes/expense limit		69,101	100.0		
Total rejected ballots		415			
Turnout		69,516	70.8		
Eligible voters		98,190			
Liberal hold		Swing		+2.67	
Source: Elections Canada

2014 Ontario general election: Ajax—Pickering
Party	Candidate	Votes	%	±%
Liberal	Joe Dickson	26,257	51.06	+3.73
Progressive Conservative	Todd McCarthy	14,999	29.17	–6.37
New Democratic	Jermaine King	8,274	16.09	+1.72
Green	Adam Narraway	1,589	3.09	+1.05
Libertarian	Kyle Stewart	301	0.59	–0.14
Total valid votes		51,420	98.88	
Total rejected, unmarked and declined ballots		580	1.12	+0.70
Turnout		52,000	50.18	+5.34
Eligible voters		103,629		
Liberal hold		Swing		+5.05
Source: Elections Ontario

2011 Ontario general election: Ajax—Pickering
Party	Candidate	Votes	%	±%
Liberal	Joe Dickson	19,606	47.34	–1.74
Progressive Conservative	Todd McCarthy	14,718	35.54	+1.19
New Democratic	Evan Wiseman	5,952	14.37	+6.28
Green	Steven Toman	843	2.04	–5.54
Libertarian	Andrew Delis	299	0.72	–
Total valid votes		41,418	99.59	
Total rejected, unmarked and declined ballots		172	0.41	–0.07
Turnout		41,590	44.84	–4.49
Eligible voters		92,745		
Liberal hold		Swing		–1.46
Source: Elections Ontario
