= Tracy MacCharles =

Canadian politician

The Honourable Tracy MacCharles ECO

Member of the Ontario Provincial Parliament for Pickering—Scarborough East
- In office October 6, 2011 – June 7, 2018
- Preceded by: Wayne Arthurs
- Succeeded by: Peter Bethlenfalvy

Personal details
- Born: 1963 (age 62–63) Scarborough, Ontario
- Party: Liberal
- Spouse: Stephen Little
- Children: 2
- Profession: Human resources

Tracy MacCharles (born c. 1963) is a former politician in Ontario, Canada. She was a Liberal member of the Legislative Assembly of Ontario from 2011 to 2018 who represented the riding of Pickering—Scarborough East. She was a member of cabinet in the government of Kathleen Wynne.

== Background ==
MacCharles was born and raised in Scarborough, Ontario. She went to Brock University where she obtained a degree in Business and Public Administration. She worked in human resources management in various roles including Vice President of Human Resources at Manulife Financial. She was chair of the Ontario Accessibility Standards Advisory Council and was a member of the Durham Board of Education’s Special Education Advisory Committee.

She lives in Pickering with her husband Stephen Little and their two children.

== Politics ==
MacCharles ran in the 2011 provincial election as the Liberal candidate in the riding of Pickering—Scarborough East. She defeated Progressive Conservative candidate Kevin Gaudet by 5,168 votes. She was easily re-elected in the 2014 election defeating Gaudet again, this time by 10,568 votes.

On November 10, 2011, MacCharles was appointed as Parliamentary Assistant to the Minister of Children and Youth Services. On February 11, 2013 she was sworn in as Minister of Consumer Services under new Premier Kathleen Wynne. On June 24, 2014 she was appointed Minister of Children and Youth Services as well as Minister responsible for Women's Issues.

On April 5, 2016, MacCharles announced changes in the autism services program, which included opening up 16,000 new spaces with an investment of $333 million additional dollars to the program. However, the announced changes also included removing children with autism over the age of five from the IBI waitlist to the ABA waitlist, and giving the families an $8000 stipend for these children to receive treatment. The move was resisted by some parents and expert groups. The government revised the changes two months later and MacCharles was demoted to the role of Minister without portfolio, responsible for accessibility and women's issues in Ontario.

On January 12, 2017, she was promoted to the position of Minister of Government and Consumer Services, a move precipitated by the resignation of David Orazietti in December 2016.

MacCharles announced her retirement from provincial politics in April 2018, a few months before the next Ontario election.

=== Cabinet positions ===
Wynne ministry, Province of Ontario (2013–2018)
Cabinet posts (3)
Predecessor	Office	Successor
Marie-France Lalonde	Minister of Government and Consumer Services; 2017-2018; Also responsible for accessibility issues	Todd Smith
	Minister without portfolio 2016-2017; Responsible for accessibility and women's issues	Indira Naidoo-Harris (Note: Harris appointed as Minister responsible for women's issues.)
Teresa Piruzza	Minister of Children and Youth Services; 2014–2016; Also responsible for women's issues	Michael Coteau
McGuinty ministry, Province of Ontario (2003–2013)
Cabinet post (1)
Predecessor	Office	Successor
Margarett Best	Minister of Consumer Services; 2013–2014	David Orazietti

== Election results ==
2014 Ontario general election
Party	Candidate	Votes	%	±%
Liberal	Tracy MacCharles	23,206	52.0	5.3
Progressive Conservative	Kevin Gaudet	12,638	28.3	-5.1
New Democratic	Eileen Higdon	6,600	14.8	-1.7
Green	Anthony Navarro	1,564	3.5	0.7
Libertarian	Scott Hoefig	463	1.1	0.5
Freedom	Matt Oliver	193	0.4	
Total valid votes		44,664	100.0	

2011 Ontario general election
Party	Candidate	Votes	%	±%
Liberal	Tracy MacCharles	18,201	46.7	
Progressive Conservative	Kevin Gaudet	13,033	33.4	
New Democratic	Nerissa Carino	6,424	16.5	
Green	Kevin Smith	1,096	2.8	
Libertarian	Heath Thomas	252	0.6	
Total valid votes		39,006	100.0	14.5
