= Janet Ecker =

Canadian politician

The Honourable Janet Ecker ECO

Member of the Ontario Provincial Parliament
- In office 1999–2003
- Preceded by: New riding
- Succeeded by: Wayne Arthurs
- Constituency: Pickering—Ajax—Uxbridge
- In office 1995–1999
- Preceded by: Jim Wiseman
- Succeeded by: Riding dissolved
- Constituency: Durham West

Personal details
- Born: October 18, 1953 (age 72) Simcoe, Ontario
- Party: Progressive Conservative Party
- Occupation: Management Consultant

Janet Ecker CM (born October 18, 1953) is a former politician in Ontario, Canada. She was a member of the Legislative Assembly of Ontario from 1995 to 2003, and was a senior cabinet minister in the governments of Mike Harris and Ernie Eves.

== Background ==
Ecker grew up in Exeter, Ontario. Her father was a family physician. She earned a Bachelor of Arts degree in journalism from the University of Western Ontario. In 1985, Ecker served as Director of Communications at the Ontario Treasury. She worked as a Government Relations Consultant with Public Affairs Management from 1987 to 1991, and was Director of Policy for the College of Physicians and Surgeons of Ontario from 1991 to 1995.

== Politics ==
Ecker was also involved with the Progressive Conservative Party of Ontario during these years. A Red Tory, she supported Larry Grossman at both of the party's 1985 leadership conventions, and served as Assistant Executive Director of the Ontario PC Party from 1985 to 1987.

She was elected to the Ontario legislature in the provincial election of 1995, defeating Liberal Joe Dickson and incumbent New Democrat Jim Wiseman by a significant margin in the riding of Durham West, east of Toronto. After the election she was appointed Parliamentary Assistant to the Minister of Community and Social Services. On August 16, 1996 she was promoted to cabinet and named Minister of Community and Social Services.

=== 1999 election ===
In the provincial election of 1999, she was re-elected by a comfortable margin over Liberal Dave Ryan in the redistributed riding of Pickering—Ajax—Uxbridge. After the election, she was named to the senior portfolio of Minister of Education. Ecker also served as Government House Leader after February 8, 2001. In 1998, she supported Hugh Segal's bid for the leadership of the federal Progressive Conservative Party.

Ecker's best-known controversy as Education Minister was not with the legislative opposition or the teaching community, but with Jim Flaherty, another cabinet minister in the Harris government. In 2001, Flaherty announced that the government planned to introduce a tax credit for parents choosing to send their children to private and denominational schools. Flaherty's announcement broke a 1999 campaign pledge from Harris not to introduce such legislation. Flaherty reportedly did not consult with Ecker prior to making his statement. Ecker opposed this shift in policy, and according to some accounts was initially prepared to quit cabinet over the issue. She was persuaded to stay, but remained on very poor terms with Flaherty. As a result of this controversy, Ecker became a leading spokesperson for "moderate conservative" positions in her party, against the right-wing views of Flaherty and Harris.

When Harris resigned as party leader in 2002, many anticipated that Ecker would join the contest to replace him. Instead, she supported the candidacy of Ernie Eves, who won by defeating Flaherty in the second round of balloting. Ecker was named Minister of Finance on April 15, 2002. Shortly after being named as Finance Minister, Ecker announced that the Eves government would postpone the previously-announced private-school tax credit.

Ecker also introduced the Eves government's Keeping the Promise for a Strong Economy Act (Budget Measures), 2002.

In 2003, Ecker delivered her provincial budget at an auto parts factory owned by Magna International, rather than in the legislature. The move was widely criticized, even by some members of the Progressive Conservative party. Despite her previous opposition, Ecker re-introduced the private-school tax credit in this budget.

The Eves government was defeated in the provincial election of 2003, and Ecker herself was narrowly defeated by Wayne Arthurs of the Liberal Party.

=== Cabinet positions ===
Eves ministry, Province of Ontario (2002–2003)
Cabinet post (1)
Predecessor	Office	Successor
Jim Flaherty	Minister of Finance; 2002–2003	Greg Sorbara
Harris ministry, Province of Ontario (1995–2002)
Cabinet posts (2)
Predecessor	Office	Successor
David Johnson	Minister of Education; 1999–2002	Elizabeth Witmer
David Tsubouchi	Minister of Community and Social Services; 1996–1999	John Baird
Special Parliamentary Responsibilities
Predecessor	Title	Successor
Norm Sterling	Government House Leader; 2001–2002	Chris Stockwell

== After politics ==
Ecker is an advisor with Tramore Group, a Toronto-based program management professional services firm. She also teaches public administration at Queen's University in Kingston. In 2004, she supported Belinda Stronach's unsuccessful campaign to lead the new Conservative Party of Canada. In 2005 she was named as president of the Toronto Financial Services Alliance. She supported Christine Elliott (spouse of Jim Flaherty) during the 2009 Progressive Conservative Party of Ontario leadership election and served as her campaign chair.

In December 2016, Ecker was named a Member of the Order of Canada for being a leader in the financial industry.
