= Ajax—Pickering (provincial electoral district) =

Former provincial electoral district

Ontario electoral district
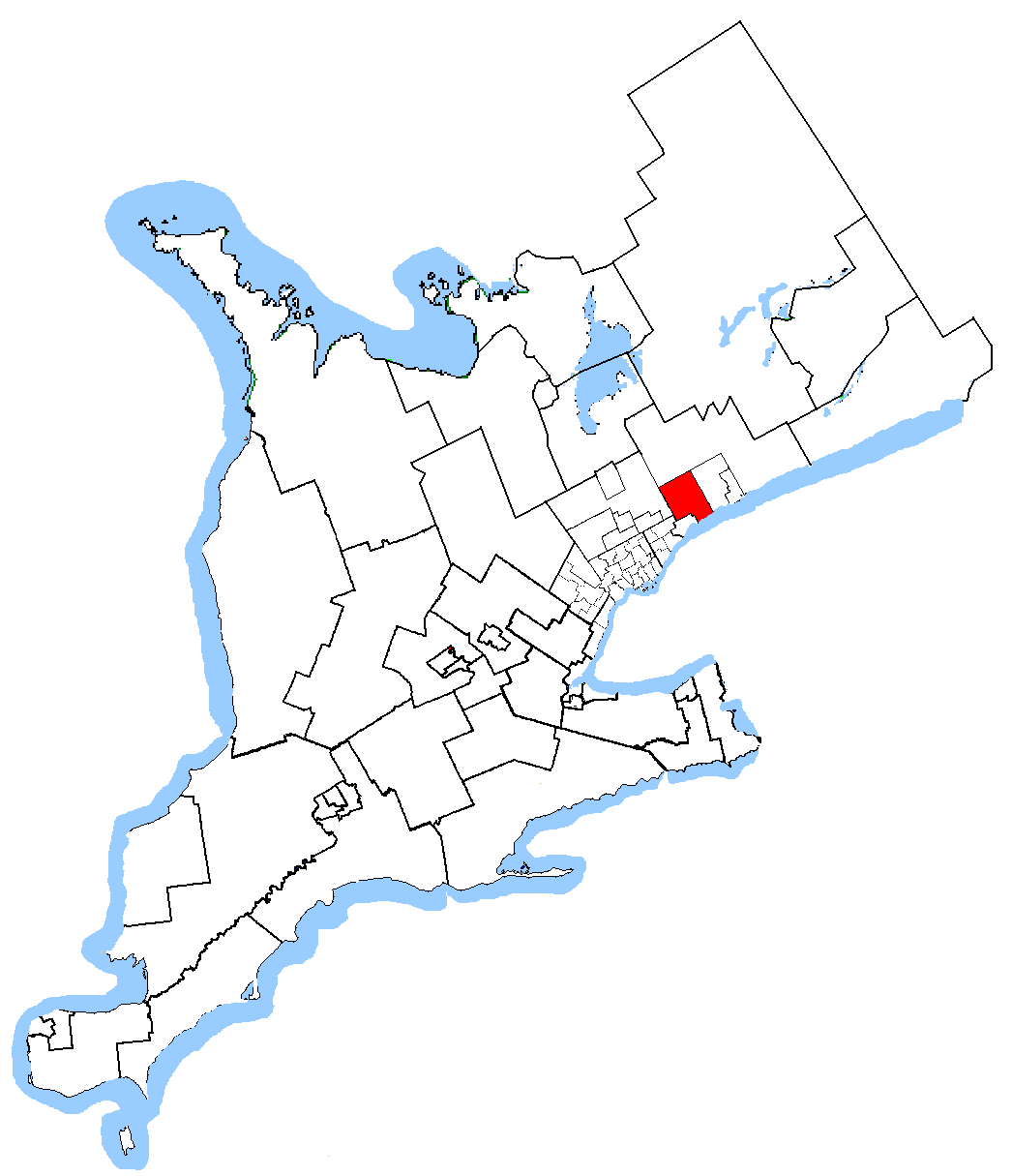
- Coordinates: 43°51′02″N 79°01′27″W; Location of the constituency office (as of 12 July 2010)

Defunct provincial electoral district
- Legislature: Legislative Assembly of Ontario
- District created: 2005
- First contested: 2007
- Last contested: 2014

Demographics
- Population (2011): 137,215
- Electors (2011): 92,745
- Area (km²): 286
- Census division: Durham
- Census subdivision(s): Ajax, Pickering

Ajax—Pickering was a provincial electoral district in central Ontario, Canada. It was first contested in the 2007 provincial election. 55.2% of the riding came from Pickering—Ajax—Uxbridge while 44.8% came from Whitby—Ajax.

The riding included all of the Town of Ajax plus that part of the City of Pickering north of Finch Avenue and east of Brock Road, as well as the area north of Highway 401 and east of Valley Farm Road.

In 2018, the district was dissolved into Pickering—Uxbridge and Ajax.

== Members of Provincial Parliament ==
Ajax—Pickering
Assembly	Years	Member	Party
Riding created from Pickering—Ajax—Uxbridge and Whitby—Ajax
39th	2007–2011	Joe Dickson	Liberal
40th	2011–2014	Joe Dickson	Liberal
41st	2014–2018	Joe Dickson	Liberal
Riding dissolved into Pickering—Uxbridge and Ajax

== Election results ==
2014 Ontario general election
Party	Candidate	Votes	%	±%
Liberal	Joe Dickson	26,257	51.06	+3.73
Progressive Conservative	Todd McCarthy	14,999	29.17	–6.37
New Democratic	Jermaine King	8,274	16.09	+1.72
Green	Adam Narraway	1,589	3.09	+1.05
Libertarian	Kyle Stewart	301	0.59	–0.14
Total valid votes		51,420	98.88	
Total rejected, unmarked and declined ballots		580	1.12	+0.70
Turnout		52,000	50.18	+5.34
Eligible voters		103,629		
Liberal hold		Swing		+5.05
Source: Elections Ontario

2011 Ontario general election
Party	Candidate	Votes	%	±%
Liberal	Joe Dickson	19,606	47.34	–1.74
Progressive Conservative	Todd McCarthy	14,718	35.54	+1.19
New Democratic	Evan Wiseman	5,952	14.37	+6.28
Green	Steven Toman	843	2.04	–5.54
Libertarian	Andrew Delis	299	0.72	–
Total valid votes		41,418	99.59	
Total rejected, unmarked and declined ballots		172	0.41	–0.07
Turnout		41,590	44.84	–4.49
Eligible voters		92,745		
Liberal hold		Swing		–1.46
Source: Elections Ontario

2007 Ontario general election
Party	Candidate	Votes	%
Liberal	Joe Dickson	19,857	49.07
Progressive Conservative	Kevin Ashe	13,898	34.35
New Democratic	Bala Thavarajasoorier	3,275	8.09
Green	Cecile Willert	3,067	7.58
Family Coalition	Andrew Carvalho	368	0.91
Total valid votes		40,465	99.52
Total rejected, unmarked and declined ballots		197	0.48
Turnout		40,662	49.34
Eligible voters		82,416	
Source: Elections Ontario

== 2007 electoral reform referendum ==
2007 Ontario electoral reform referendum
Side	Votes	%
First Past the Post	24,946	63.0
Mixed member proportional	14,657	37.0
Total valid votes	39,603	100.0
