= Jennifer O'Connell =

Canadian politician

Member of Parliament for Pickering—Uxbridge
- In office October 19, 2015 – March 23, 2025
- Preceded by: Riding Established
- Succeeded by: Juanita Nathan

Parliamentary Secretary to the Minister of Public Safety (Cybersecurity)
- In office February 21, 2025 – March 23, 2025
- Minister: David McGuinty

Parliamentary Secretary to the Minister of Public Safety, Democratic Institutions and Intergovernmental Affairs (Cybersecurity)
- In office September 18, 2023 – February 20, 2025
- Minister: Dominic LeBlanc
- Preceded by: Pam Damoff

Parliamentary Secretary to the Minister of Intergovernmental Affairs, Infrastructure and Communities
- In office December 3, 2021 – September 17, 2023
- Minister: Dominic LeBlanc

Parliamentary Secretary to the Minister of Health
- In office March 19, 2021 – August 15, 2021
- Minister: Patty Hajdu

Parliamentary Secretary to the Minister of Finance (Youth Economic Opportunity)
- In office August 31, 2018 – September 11, 2019
- Minister: Bill Morneau

Durham Regional Councillor
- In office December 1, 2010 – October 19, 2015
- Preceded by: Bonnie Littley
- Succeeded by: Kevin Ashe
- Constituency: Ward 1

Pickering City Councillor
- In office December 1, 2006 – December 1, 2010
- Preceded by: Kevin Ashe
- Succeeded by: Kevin Ashe
- Constituency: Ward 1

Personal details
- Born: 1983 (age 42–43)
- Party: Liberal
- Education: University of Toronto

Jennifer O'Connell (born 1983) is a Canadian Liberal politician, who was elected to represent the riding of Pickering—Uxbridge in the House of Commons of Canada in the 2015 federal election. She did not seek re-election in 2025.

O'Connell served as the Parliamentary Secretary to Dominic Leblanc, the Minister of Public Safety, Democratic Institutions, and Intergovernmental Affairs (Cybersecurity). She also served as the Parliamentary Secretary to the Minister of Finance (Youth Economic Opportunity) and to the Minister of Health during the COVID-19 pandemic.

O’Connell was also a member of several Standing House of Commons Committees, including Finance, Health, National Security and Intelligence Committee of Parliamentarians, National Defence, Transport, and Public Safety and National Security.

== Background ==
Jennifer O'Connell graduated with a Bachelor of Arts Degree in Political Science from the University of Toronto. In 2006, she won a seat on Pickering City Council, becoming the youngest woman to be elected as a Councillor in the City’s history, defeating incumbent Kevin Ashe. She was elected in 2010 and 2014 as a Durham Region Councillor, increasing her support in each election.

At the time of her election to the House of Commons in 2015, O’Connell was serving as the Deputy Mayor of Pickering.

== Municipal politics ==
On Council, O’Connell developed a reputation for aggressively opposing perceived wasteful spending by the City of Pickering and the Regional Municipality of Durham. In response to a Councillor’s expenses scandal, she attempted to remove him as the Deputy Mayor and Chairman of the Veridian Board.

O’Connell served on several boards and committees, including the Durham Region Finance and Administration Committee. She spent four years as Chair of Pickering’s Waterfront Committee and Vice-Chair of the Sustainable Pickering Advisory Committee.

== Federal politics ==
Following her victory in the 2014 municipal election, O’Connell was approached by the Liberal Party of Canada about running as the party’s candidate in the new riding of Pickering-Uxbridge. She won the party’s nomination and defeated Conservative Party of Canada MP, Corneliu Chisu in the 2015 Federal Election.

After taking her seat in the House of Commons, O’Connell served on the House Standing Committee on Finance. In 2018, Prime Minister Justin Trudeau appointed O’Connell as the Parliamentary Secretary to the Minister of Finance with an additional mandate focused on Youth Economic Opportunity in advance of the 2019 federal budget. When Finance Minister Bill Morneau presented the government's budget, it included a separate comprehensive document focused solely on youth economic issues entitled “Investing in the Future of Young Canadians”.

The budget introduced the First Time Home Buyer Incentive, which provides eligible Canadians with the option to finance a portion of their first home purchase through a shared equity mortgage with the Canada Mortgage and Housing Corporation. The budget lowered interest rates on student loans and provided an interest-free grace period for recent graduates and those facing health or family-related challenges. It also funded an expansion of work-integrated learning programs to create 40,000 new annual placements, including to the Business/Higher Education Roundtable for 44,000 additional opportunities by 2021.

In 2018, she worked with Conservative MP Erin O’Toole and the Minister of Veterans Affairs, Seamus O’Regan to secure the unanimous support of the House of Commons and the Senate to erect a tribute in Parliament to Lt.-Col. Samuel Sharpe, a sitting MP who enlisted at the outbreak of the First World War. Sharpe died by suicide upon his return after battling “shell shock”, now understood to be the symptoms of Post-Traumatic Stress Disorder.

After she was re-elected in the 2019 Federal Election, she was appointed to the National Security and Intelligence Committee of Parliamentarians (NSICOP). At the height of the COVID-19 pandemic, Prime Minister Trudeau appointed O’Connell as the Parliamentary Secretary to the Minister of Health, where she appeared on national television and answered questions from the opposition in the House of Commons on the government’s response to the global pandemic.

After she was re-elected in the 2021 federal election, she was appointed as the Parliamentary Secretary to the Minister of Intergovernmental Affairs, Infrastructure and Communities, Dominic LeBlanc. When LeBlanc became the Minister of Public Safety, Democratic Institutions, and Intergovernmental Affairs in 2023, O’Connell continued as his Parliamentary Secretary, with a specific additional mandate focused on the government’s cybersecurity policy agenda.

In February 2025, O'Connell announced that she wouldn't run for re-election in the 2025 federal election.

== Electoral record ==
2021 Canadian federal election: Pickering—Uxbridge
Party	Candidate	Votes	%	±%	Expenditures
Liberal	Jennifer O'Connell	27,271	46.9	-4.1	$63,374.89
Conservative	Jacob Mantle	20,976	36.1	+7.0	$113,717.90
New Democratic	Eileen Higdon	7,396	13.1	+1.2	$3,884.61
People's	Corneliu Chisu	2,328	4.0	+2.0	$2,394.19
Total valid votes/expense limit		58,167	–	–	$121,844.79
Total rejected ballots		302			
Turnout		58,469	62.16		
Eligible voters		94,059			
Source: Elections Canada

2019 Canadian federal election: Pickering—Uxbridge
Party	Candidate	Votes	%	±%	Expenditures
Liberal	Jennifer O'Connell	32,387	51.0	+0.7	$79,048.14
Conservative	Cyma Musarat	18,462	29.1	-9.1	$56,879.42
New Democratic	Eileen Higdon	7,582	11.9	+2.7	$9,433.88
Green	Peter Forint	3,799	6.0	+3.7	$7,976.00
People's	Corneliu Chisu	1,265	2.0		$7,989.04
Total valid votes/expense limit		63,495	100.0		
Total rejected ballots		407			
Turnout		63,902	68.9		
Eligible voters		92,699			
Liberal hold		Swing		+4.90	
Source: Elections Canada

2015 Canadian federal election: Pickering—Uxbridge
Party	Candidate	Votes	%	±%	Expenditures
Liberal	Jennifer O'Connell	29,757	50.1%	+16.5	–
Conservative	Corneliu Chisu	22,591	38.2%	-7.8	–
New Democratic	Pamela Downward	5,446	9.1%	-6.6	–
Green	Anthony Jordan Navarro	1,365	2.2%	-2.3	–
Total valid votes/Expense limit		59,159	100.0		$223,459.17
Total rejected ballots		222	0.3%	–	
Turnout		59,381	–	–	
Eligible voters		85,794			
Source: Elections Canada

2014 Pickering election, Regional Councillor for Ward 1
Council candidate	Vote	%
Jennifer O'Connell (X)	5,555	72.08
Nick Tsetsakos	732	9.50
Myrna Picotte	656	8.51
Enrico Pistritto	638	8.28
Shawn Sandrasagara	126	1.63

2010 Pickering election, Regional Councillor for Ward 1
Council candidate	Vote	%
Jennifer O'Connell	4,065	55.10
Bonnie Littley (X)	3,313	44.90

2006 Pickering election, City Councillor for Ward 1
Council candidate	Vote	%
Jennifer O'Connell	2,895	45.38
Kevin Ashe (X)	2,732	42.83
Paul White	752	11.79
