= Joe Dickson =

Canadian politician (1940–2022)

Joe Dickson MPP
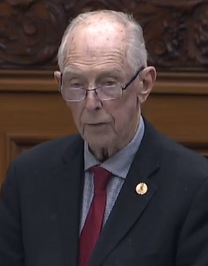
- Dickson in 2018

Ontario MPP
- In office 2007–2018
- Preceded by: New riding
- Succeeded by: Riding abolished
- Constituency: Ajax—Pickering

Personal details
- Born: Louis Joseph Dickson; March 26, 1940 Ajax, Ontario
- Died: April 6, 2022 (aged 82)
- Party: Liberal
- Spouse: Donna
- Children: 2
- Occupation: Businessowner

Joe Dickson (March 26, 1940 – April 6, 2022) was a politician in Ontario, Canada. He was a Liberal member of the Legislative Assembly of Ontario from 2007 to 2018 who represented the riding of Ajax—Pickering.

== Background ==
Dickson was born and raised in Ajax, Ontario. He was the owner of a printing business, Dickson Printing Ltd. Dickson was a recipient of the Queen Elizabeth II Golden Jubilee Medal and the Queen Elizabeth II Diamond Jubilee Medal. He supports 22 Ajax-Pickering area sports teams. He lived in Ajax with his wife Donna. They have two adult children and five grandchildren. He died April 7, 2022.

== Politics ==
Dickson began his career and community involvement as a trustee of the local Catholic District School Board. Dickson was a councillor for the town of Ajax, Ontario from 1983 to 1990 and then from 1992 to 2006. He also served as a regional councillor for Durham. and also served as a trustee on the Ajax Catholic School Board.

Dickson ran for the Liberal Party in the 1995 election in the riding of Durham West but lost to Janet Ecker by 15,258 votes.

In the 2007 provincial election he ran for the Liberals again in the candidate in the riding of Ajax—Pickering. He defeated Progressive Conservative candidate Kevin Ashe by 5,959 votes. He was re-elected in 2011 and 2014.

Dickson served as a deputy government whip from 2007 to 2011. In September 2013, he was appointed as parliamentary assistant to the Minister of Citizenship and Immigration and he served in that capacity until the Legislature was dissolved May 2, 2014. In July 2014 he was appointed Parliamentary Assistant to the Minister of Northern Development and Mines.

In the 2018 provincial election he ran in the redistributed riding of Ajax. He came in third behind Progressive Conservative winner Rod Phillips and runner-up New Democrat Monique Hughes.

== Electoral record ==
2018 Ontario general election: Ajax
Party	Candidate	Votes	%
Progressive Conservative	Rod Phillips	19,078	39.05%
New Democratic	Monique Hughes	15,130	30.97%
Liberal	Joe Dickson	12,607	25.80%
Green	Stephen Leahy	1,244	2.51%
Libertarian	Marsha Haynes	312	0.64%
None of the Above	Frank Lopez	289	0.59%
Independent	Kevin J. Brackley	220	0.45%
Total valid votes		48,860	99.14%
Total rejected, unmarked and declined ballots		421	0.86%
Turnout		49,281	56.21%
Eligible voters		87,672	
Progressive Conservative pickup new district.			
Source: Elections Ontario

2014 Ontario general election: Ajax—Pickering
Party	Candidate	Votes	%	±%
Liberal	Joe Dickson	26,257	51.06	+3.72
Progressive Conservative	Todd McCarthy	14,999	29.17	−6.17
New Democratic	Jermaine King	8,274	16.09	+1.72
Green	Adam Narraway	1,589	3.09	+1.06
Libertarian	Kyle Stewart	301	0.59	−0.13
Total valid votes		51,420	100.0	+23.94
Total rejected, unmarked and declined ballots		580	1.12	+0.71
Turnout		52,000	50.18	+5.38
Eligible voters		103,629		+11.74
Liberal hold		Swing		+4.95
Source(s) Elections Ontario. "Official Return from the Records, 001 Ajax—Pickering" (PDF).

2011 Ontario general election: Ajax—Pickering
Party	Candidate	Votes	%	±%
Liberal	Joe Dickson	19,606	47.34	−1.74
Progressive Conservative	Todd McCarthy	14,718	35.54	+1.19
New Democratic	Evan Wiseman	5,952	14.37	+6.28
Green	Steven Toman	843	2.04	−5.54
Libertarian	Andrew Delis	299	0.72	
Total valid votes		41,418	100.0	+2.36
Total rejected, unmarked and declined ballots		172	0.41	−0.07
Turnout		41,590	44.8	−4.5
Eligible voters		92,745		+12.53
Liberal hold		Swing		−1.47
Source(s) "Summary of Valid Votes Cast for Each Candidate – October 6, 2011 General Election" (PDF). Elections Ontario. November 18, 2011. "Statistical Summary – General Elections 2011" ( XLS Spreadsheet). Elections Ontario. October 1, 2013.

2007 Ontario general election: Ajax—Pickering
Party	Candidate	Votes	%
Liberal	Joe Dickson	19,857	49.07
Progressive Conservative	Kevin Ashe	13,898	34.35
New Democratic	Bala Thavarajasoorier	3,275	8.09
Green	Cecile Willert	3,067	7.58
Family Coalition	Andrew Carvalho	368	0.91
Total valid votes		40,465	100.0
Total rejected ballots		197	0.48
Turnout		40,662	49.3
Eligible voters		82,416	
Source(s) "Summary of Valid Votes Cast for Each Candidate – October 10, 2007 General Election" (PDF). Elections Ontario. August 14, 2008. "Statistical Summary – General Elections 2007" (PDF). Elections Ontario. May 8, 2008.

1995 Ontario general election: Durham West
Party	Candidate	Votes	%
Progressive Conservative	Janet Ecker	29,232	54.6
Liberal	Joe Dickson	13,974	26.1
New Democratic	Jim Wiseman	9,444	17.6
Independent	Neil Fonseka	904	1.7
