= Pickering—Ajax—Uxbridge (provincial electoral district) =

Former provincial electoral district in Ontario, Canada

Pickering—Ajax—Uxbridge was a provincial electoral district in central Ontario, Canada, that elected one Member of the Legislative Assembly of Ontario. It was created in 1999 from Durham West and Durham—York. It was abolished in 2007 with the territory rolled into Ajax—Pickering, Durham and Pickering—Scarborough East.

The riding included all of Pickering and Uxbridge plus all of Ajax north of Finch Avenue.

== Members of Provincial Parliament ==
1. Janet Ecker, Ontario Progressive Conservative Party (1999–2003)
2. Wayne Arthurs, Ontario Liberal Party (2003–2007)

== Election results ==
2003 Ontario general election
| Party | Candidate | Votes | % | ±% |
|---|---|---|---|---|
| Liberal | Wayne Arthurs | 24,970 | 45.76 | +11.48 |
| Progressive Conservative | Janet Ecker | 23,960 | 43.91 | –14.28 |
| New Democratic | Vern Edwards | 3,690 | 6.76 | +1.05 |
| Green | Adam Duncan | 1,946 | 3.57 | +2.14 |
| Total valid votes | | 54,566 | 99.52 | |
| Total rejected, unmarked and declined ballots | | 261 | 0.48 | –0.06 |
| Turnout | | 54,827 | 59.62 | –0.01 |
| Eligible voters | | 91,955 | | |
| Liberal gain from Progressive Conservative | | Swing | | +12.88 |
Source: Elections Ontario

1999 Ontario general election
| Party | Candidate | Votes | % |
|---|---|---|---|
| Progressive Conservative | Janet Ecker | 28,661 | 58.19 |
| Liberal | Dave Ryan | 16,881 | 34.28 |
| New Democratic | Jim Wiseman | 2,814 | 5.71 |
| Green | Chris Pennington | 703 | 1.43 |
| Natural Law | Bob Riaz | 191 | 0.39 |
| Total valid votes | | 49,250 | 99.46 |
| Total rejected, unmarked and declined ballots | | 267 | 0.54 |
| Turnout | | 49,517 | 59.63 |
| Eligible voters | | 83,039 | |
| Progressive Conservative pickup new district. | | | |
Source: Elections Ontario

== See also ==
- List of Ontario provincial electoral districts
- Canadian provincial electoral districts
