= Kevin Ashe =

Canadian politician

His Worship Kevin Ashe

Chair of Durham Regional Municipality
- Incumbent
- Assumed office November 15, 2026
- Preceded by: John Henry

Mayor of Pickering
- Incumbent
- Assumed office November 15, 2022
- Preceded by: Dave Ryan

Pickering City Councillor
- In office December 1, 2003 – December 1, 2006
- Preceded by: Dave Ryan
- Succeeded by: Jennifer O'Connell
- Constituency: Ward 1
- In office December 1, 2010 – November 4, 2015
- Preceded by: Jennifer O'Connell
- Succeeded by: Maurice Brenner
- Constituency: Ward 1

Durham Regional Councillor
- In office November 4, 2015 – December 1, 2022
- Preceded by: Jennifer O'Connell
- Succeeded by: Maurice Brenner
- Constituency: Ward 1, Pickering

Personal details
- Born: Kevin George Ashe
- Party: Independent
- Other political affiliations: Progressive Conservative
- Spouse: Karen O'Brien
- Children: 3
- Parent: George Ashe (father)
- Occupation: Businessman

Kevin George Ashe (born c. 1962) is a Canadian politician. He has been mayor of Pickering since 2022. He has also been Durham Regional Chair since November 15, 2026.

== Early life ==
Ashe is the son of George Ashe, who was the first mayor of Pickering, and Margaret "Margo" Ashe (née Conroy). The family moved from the Ottawa area to Pickering in the 1960s.

== Career ==
=== School board ===
Ashe served as a trustee on the Durham Region Roman Catholic Separate School Board from 1985 to 1997. He was first elected to the school board in the 1985 municipal elections. At the time he was employed as a jewellery manufacturer, and ran on a stated belief in "traditional family values and service to the community". By the 1988 elections, Ashe was a group insurance consultant, and ran on a platform of increased communication with parents, and fighting to replace portable classrooms with permanent buildings. He was re-elected in 1991, and 1994. He became chair of the board in 1993.

=== Council ===
Ashe first ran for council in the 1997 municipal elections, seeking the regional seat in Ward 1. He lost in the race to Maurice Brenner. He tried again in the 2003 elections, this time running for a local council spot in Ward 1. This time he was successful, defeating his main opponent David Steele by 402 votes. He ran for re-election in the 2006 municipal elections, but was defeated by a 23-year-old Jennifer O'Connell in a close race. O'Connell remarked that her win ended the city's "old boys' club", as there weren't any female members of the previous council.

Ashe ran for the Progressive Conservative Party of Ontario in the 2007 Ontario general election in the riding of Ajax—Pickering. He defeated Ajax councillor Shaun Collier for the nomination. In the general election, he lost the race to another Ajax councillor, Joe Dickson, who was running for the Liberals. In the 2009 Progressive Conservative Party of Ontario leadership election, he supported Tim Hudak's leadership bid.

With O'Connell running for regional council, Ashe ran again for his former seat in the 2010 elections. He defeated Sherry Croteau in the Ward 1 race by 414 votes. He ran for re-election in 2014 on a platform of keeping taxes down, encouraging business growth, ensuring safe parks, streets and a safe community. Ashe was re-elected to his Ward 1 seat on election day, defeating Deborah Bissett by over 1,300 votes. In 2015, he was appointed as Ward 1's regional councillor after O'Connell was elected as the area's Member of Parliament in the 2015 Canadian federal election.

In 2016, he was one of three councillors who voted against having a by-election to fill a vacancy on council, and to instead appoint someone. As the vote was tied, council ended up appointing someone, which angered many voters who felt like their "democratic rights were trampled". Ashe suggested "[i]s democracy served by a 10 per cent turnout"? In the 2018 Progressive Conservative Party of Ontario leadership election, he supported Christine Elliott.

Ashe ran for Ward 1's regional council spot in the 2018 municipal elections. On election day, he defeated his closest competitor Musa Mansuar by nearly 800 votes.

In May 2020, Ashe tested positive for COVID-19, believing to have gotten it from his daughter who worked as a personal support worker at Orchard Villa Long Term-Care Home, which had a large outbreak resulting in 67 deaths to that point.

In January 2021, Ashe had to resign as deputy mayor of Pickering and as the Durham Police board chair after travelling to The Bahamas during the COVID-19 pandemic to spread his stepson's ashes after he died by suicide.

=== Mayor ===
This map shows the three wards of Pickering, Ontario. Wards are shaded according to which candidate got the plurality of the ward's vote in the 2022 mayoral election.

Following the announcement that incumbent Dave Ryan was not running for re-election, Ashe decided to run for the city's top job in the 2022 mayoral election. His top campaign issues during the election were jobs, affordability and environmental stability. Ashe won 39 per cent of the vote in a three-way race, defeating Janice Frampton by over 2200 votes (33 per cent) and Brad Nazar (29 per cent).

In August 2023, Ashe was criticized for "flip-flopping" on a proposed land swap in the Greenbelt during the greenbelt scandal. Ashe had originally supported the swap in 2022, which would take 7,400 acres of agriculture land in the greenbelt and remove protection of the Duffins Rouge Agricultural Preserve. However, after taking office as mayor he voted with the rest of council to oppose the swap.

In 2023, during the city's budget process, he was criticized by councillor Lisa Robinson for using his "strong mayor powers" which were granted to mayors in the province following the passage of the Strong Mayors, Building Homes Act. Ashe had promised not to use the powers when running for mayor in 2022. Ashe later criticized Robinson for being racist after she called politicians' support for Black History Month as "hypocritically championing a people’s contribution throughout history (to) get Afro-Canadian votes", suggesting they have "become 'hung up' on the transatlantic slave trade", and characterizing herself as a "modern day slave". Robinson was later docked 90 days of pay by the city's integrity commissioner, while city council voted to ask the Ontario Human Rights Commission to hold an inquiry to address her conduct.

In May 2024, Ashe asked the provincial government to revoke a minister's zoning order from 1972 in order to build homes next to the Pickering Airport Lands, an area that had been set aside by the federal government to build an international airport, but was later shelved.

In October 2026, he was re-elected as mayor, defeating six other candidates, including Ward 1 City Councillor Lisa Robinson. Ashe received 36.5% of the vote.

=== Durham Regional Chair ===
Since the 2014 municipal elections, the position of Durham Regional Chair was elected by popular vote. Following the passage of the "Better Regional Governance Act", the provincial government will fill the position through appointment. On November 10, 2026, the provincial government appointed Ashe to the position. He will continue serving as the Mayor of Pickering, but won't be sitting at the Regional Council as Mayor. As such, the city will appoint an additional Regional Councillor.
