= 2022 Durham Region municipal elections =

Ontario elections

2022 Durham Chair election
- October 24, 2022
- Turnout: 23.96%
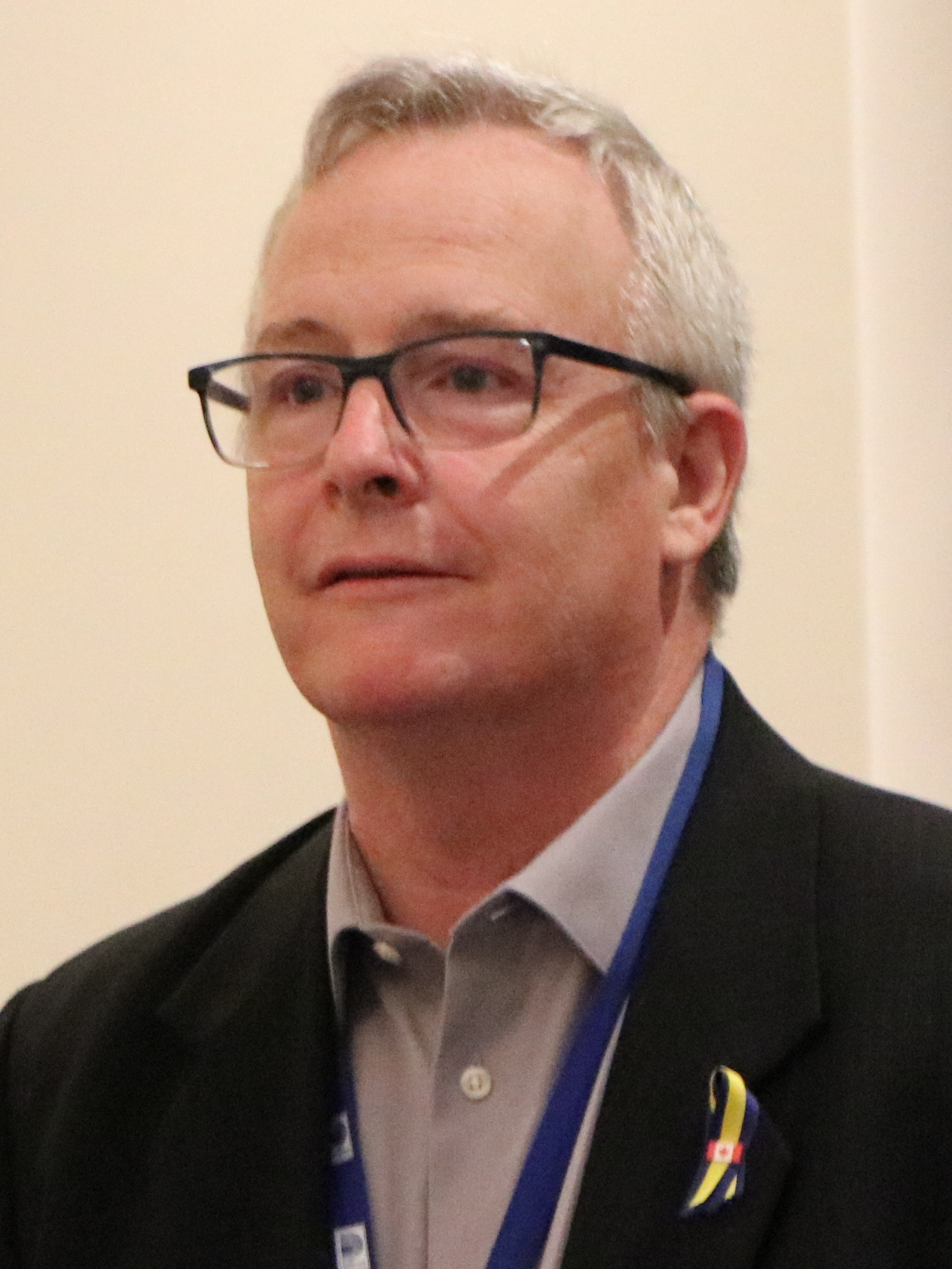

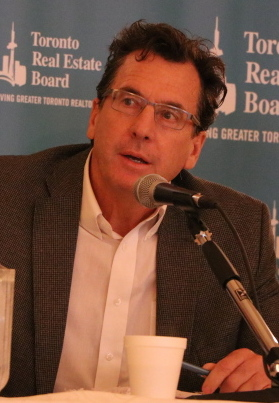
		LBM
Candidate	John Henry	Laurie Blaind Mackie
Popular vote	69,544	20,435
Percentage	63.42%	18.63%
		KTP
Candidate	Peter Neal	Kurdil-Telt Patch
Popular vote	12,788	6,895
Percentage	11.66%	6.29%
- Map showing the winning candidate's vote strength in each of the 8 municipalities. The municipalities shaded in Blue voted a majority for John Henry. Pie Charts indicate the total votes received by each candidate per municipality.
Chair before election
John Henry
Elected Chair
John Henry

Elections were held in the Regional Municipality of Durham in Ontario, on October 24, 2022, in conjunction with municipal elections across the province. Registration for candidates officially opened on Monday, May 2, 2022, and the deadline for candidate nominations was Friday, August 19 at 2 p.m.

Candidates marked with an (X) indicates they were the incumbent for that position.

== Durham Regional Council ==
Position	Elected
Chair
John Henry
Ajax
Mayor	Shaun Collier
Regional Councillor, Ward 1	Marilyn Crawford
Regional Councillor, Ward 2	Sterling Lee
Regional Councillor, Ward 3	Joanne Dies
Brock
Mayor	Walter Schummer
Regional Councillor	Michael Jubb
Clarington
Mayor	Adrian Foster
Regional Councillor, Wards 1 & 2	Granville Anderson
Regional Councillor, Wards 3 & 4	Willie Woo
Oshawa
Mayor	Dan Carter
Regional Councillor, Ward 1	John Neal
Regional Councillor, Ward 2	Tito-Dante Marimpietri
Regional Councillor, Ward 3	Bob Chapman
Regional Councillor, Ward 4	Rick Kerr
Regional Councillor, Ward 5	Brian Nicholson
Pickering
Mayor	Kevin Ashe
Regional Councillor, Ward 1	Maurice Brenner
Regional Councillor, Ward 2	Linda Cook
Regional Councillor, Ward 3	David Pickles
Scugog
Mayor	Wilma Wotten
Regional Councillor	Ian McDougall
Uxbridge
Mayor	Dave Barton
Regional Councillor	Bruce Garrod
Whitby
Mayor	Elizabeth Roy
Regional Councillor	Rhonda Mulcahy
Regional Councillor	Chris Leahy
Regional Councillor	Steve Yamada
Regional Councillor	Maleeha Shahid

== Durham Regional Chair ==
Voters from across the Durham Region directly elected the Durham Regional Chair. The following are the official results for Durham Regional Chair.

Chair John Henry won re-election.

Candidate	Vote	%
John Henry (X)	69,544	63.42
Laurie Blaind Mackie	20,435	18.63
Peter Neal	12,788	11.66
Kurdil-Telt Patch	6.895	6.29

== Ajax ==
Ajax elected 1 mayor, 3 regional councillors in 1 of 3 wards, and 3 local councillors in 1 of 3 wards.

The following are the unofficial results in the Town of Ajax.

=== Mayor ===
2022 Ajax Mayoral election
- October 24, 2022
- Turnout: 22.48%
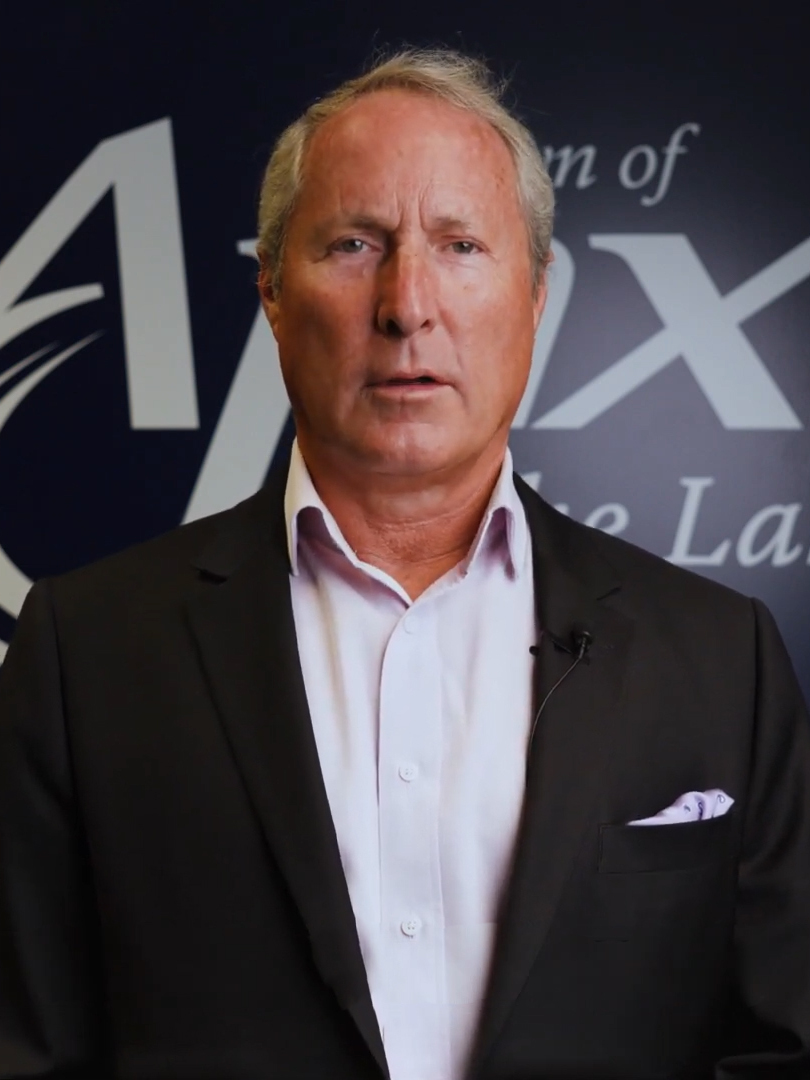
		AA
Candidate	Shaun Collier	Arthur Augustine
Popular vote	11,691	3,481
Percentage	62.32%	18.56%
	CH	GR
Candidate	Colin Hubble	Garry Reader
Popular vote	1,852	1,735
Percentage	9.87%	9.25%
Mayor before election
Shaun Collier
Elected mayor
Shaun Collier

Mayor Shaun Collier won re-election.

Candidate	Vote	%
Shaun Collier (X)	11,691	62.32
Arthur Augustine	3,481	18.56
Colin Hubble	1,852	9.87
Garry Reader	1,735	9.25

=== Regional Councillors ===
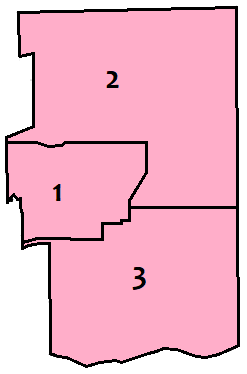
Map of Ajax's three wards

Candidate	Vote	%
Ward 1
Marilyn Crawford (X)	5,108	80.70
Intab Ali	1,222	19.30
Ward 2
Sterling Lee (X)	3,066	58.77
Vic Jagmohan	1,156	22.16
Adam Bashir	995	19.07
Ward 3
Joanne Dies (X)	5,095	73.78
Daniel Corrigan	1,811	26.22

=== Local Councillors ===
Candidate	Vote	%
Ward 1
Rob Tyler-Morin (X)	4,475	71.05
Andras Adaikkalam	962	15.27
Arshad Awan	861	13.67
Ward 2
Nancy Henry	1,667	31.22
Ashmeed Khan (X)	1,634	30.60
Selladurai Jeyakumaran	986	18.46
Azhar Khan	838	15.69
Ramon Estaris	215	4.03
Ward 3
Lisa Bower (X)	6,117	88.13
Liliane Niyongabo Kisoro	824	11.87

== Brock ==
Brock elected 1 mayor, 1 regional councillor, and 5 local councillors in 1 of 5 wards.

The following are the official results in the Township of Brock.

=== Mayor ===
2022 Brock Mayoral election
- October 24, 2022
- Turnout: 37.50%
	WS	TS	RW
Candidate	Walter Schummer	Ted Smith	Ryan Williams
Popular vote	2,185	1,147	644
Percentage	54.95%	28.85%	16.20%
Mayor before election
John Grant (appointed) (Note: Appointed as Mayor after the death of Debbie Bath-Hadden.)
Elected mayor
Walter Schummer

Mayor John Grant, who was appointed after the death of Mayor Debbie Bath-Hadden, did not run for election. Ward 3 Councillor Walter Schummer won the election, defeating Regional Councillor Ted Smith.

Candidate	Vote	%
Walter Schummer	2,185	54.95
Ted Smith	1,147	28.85
Ryan Williams	644	16.20

=== Regional Councillor ===
Map of Brock's five wards

Candidate	Vote	%
Michael Jubb	3,056	76.53
David Marquis	713	17.86
Dorothy Sanderson	224	5.61

=== Local Councillors ===
Candidate	Vote	%
Ward 1
Peter Frank	666	77.9
Mike Simard	189	22.1
Ward 2
Claire Doble (X)	Acclaimed	
Ward 3
Angela Canavan	Acclaimed	
Ward 4
Cria Pettingill (X)	Acclaimed	
Ward 5
Lynn Campbell (X)	389	50.8
Tony Laundrie	376	49.2

=== By-election ===
Following the resignation of Walter Schummer due to personal reasons, a mayoral by-election was intended to occur on September 8, 2025. Only one candidate ran, Deputy Mayor Michael Jubb, who was therefore elected by acclamation.

== Clarington ==
2022 Clarington Mayoral election
- October 24, 2022
- Turnout: 28.05%
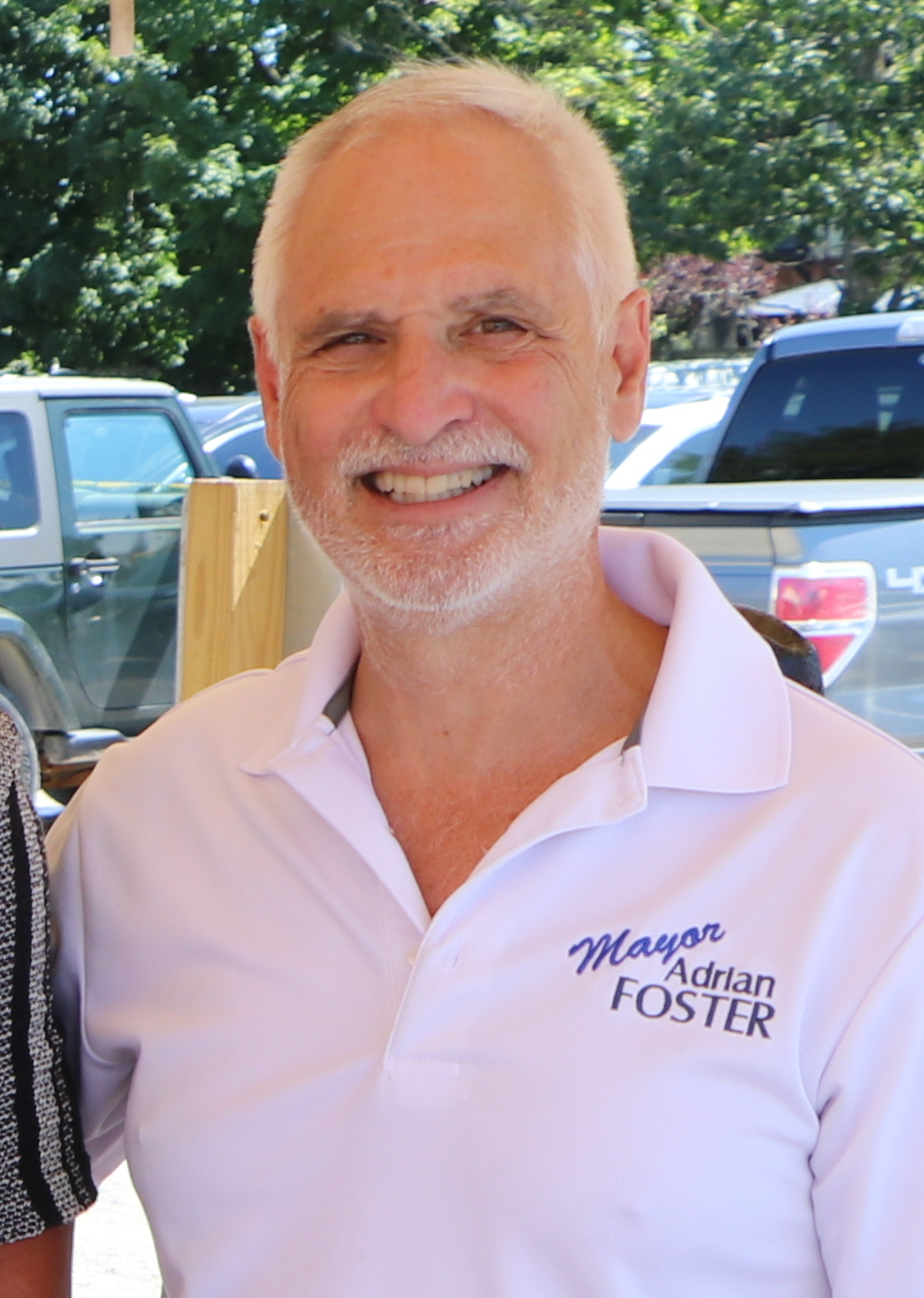

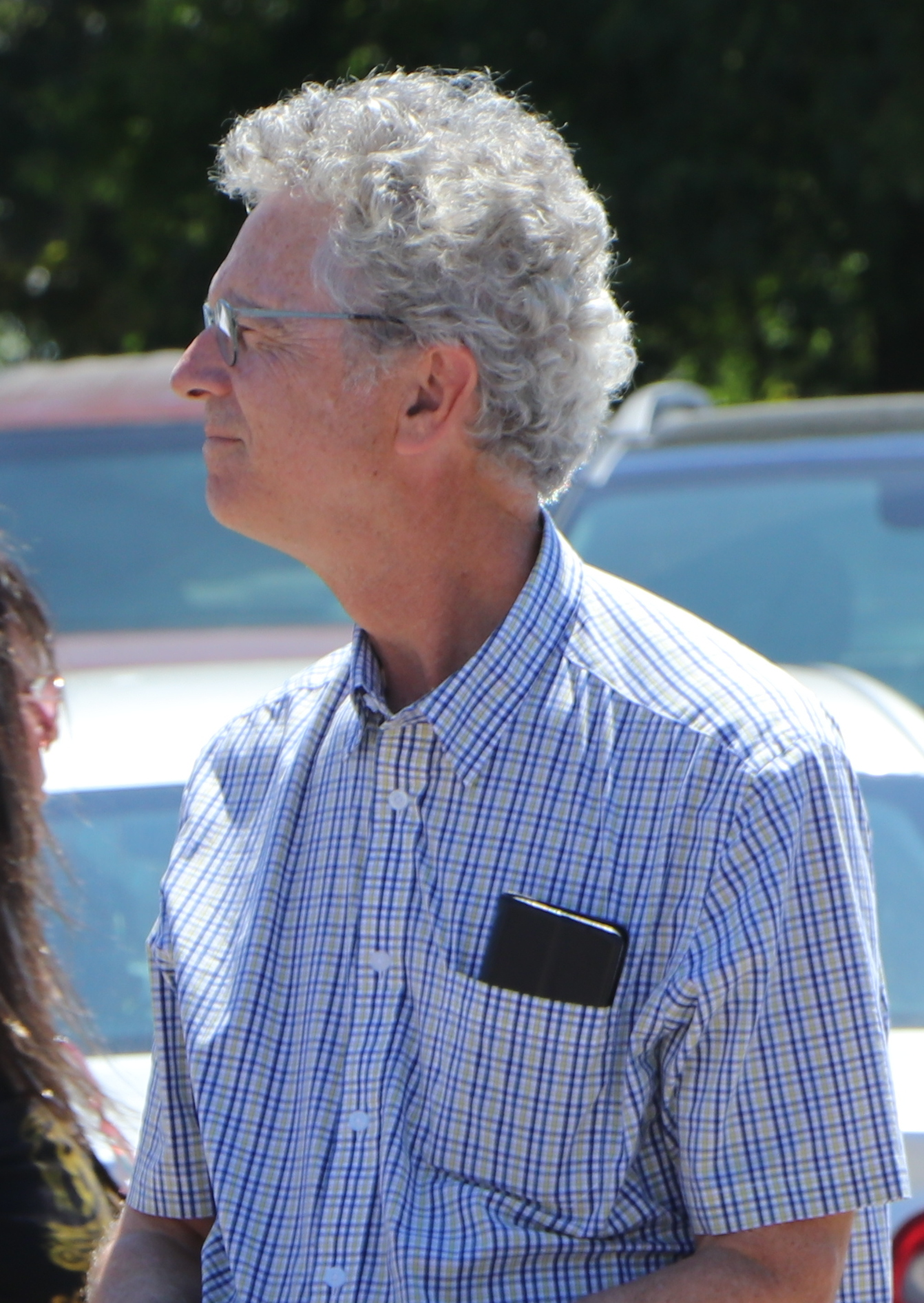

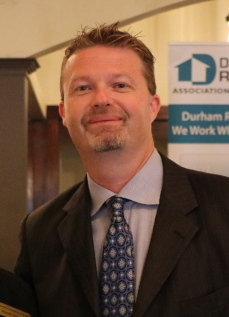
Candidate	Adrian Foster	Joe Neal	Tom Dingwall
Popular vote	8,607	6,053	5,451
Percentage	42.49%	29.88%	26.91%
Mayor before election
Adrian Foster
Elected mayor
Adrian Foster

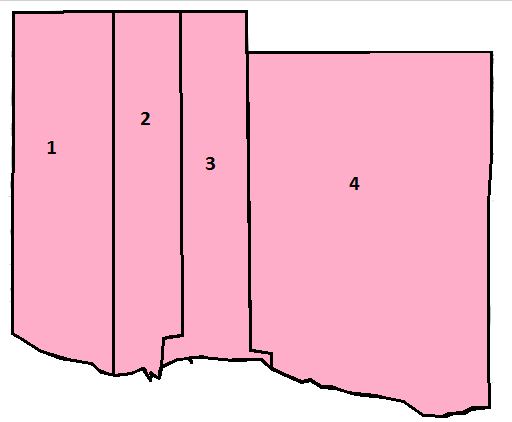
Map of Clarington's four wards

Clarington elected 1 mayor, 2 regional councillors in 1 of 2 wards, and 4 local councillors in 1 of 4 wards.

The following are the official results in the Municipality of Clarington.

=== Mayor ===
Mayor Adrian Foster won re-election.

Candidate	Vote	%
Adrian Foster (X)	8,607	42.5
Joe Neal	6,053	29.9
Tom Dingwall	5,451	26.9
Mirko Pejic	145	0.7

=== Regional Councillors ===
Candidate	Vote	%
Wards 1 & 2
Granville Anderson	5,290	44.2
Janice Jones	5,143	42.9
Bernard Sanchez	1,543	12.9
Wards 3 & 4
Willie Woo	Acclaimed	

=== Local Councillors ===
Candidate	Vote	%
Ward 1
Sami Elhajjeh	2,800	47.7
Steven Conway	1,391	23.7
Robert Livingstone	1,022	17.4
Larey Reynolds	658	11.2
Ward 2
Lloyd Rang	2,795	52.3
Ryan Kerr	2,552	47.7
Ward 3
Corinna Traill (X)	2,115	55.1
Marven Whidden	1,073	28.0
Glenn Baswick	649	16.9
Ward 4
Margaret Zwart (X)	2,103	52.2
Jim Abernethy	1,581	39.2
Christy Gunaratnam	346	8.6

== Oshawa ==
Oshawa elected 1 mayor, 1 regional and city councillors in 1 of 5 wards, and 5 city councillors in 1 of 5 wards.

The following are the official results in the City of Oshawa.

=== Mayor ===
2022 Oshawa Mayoral election
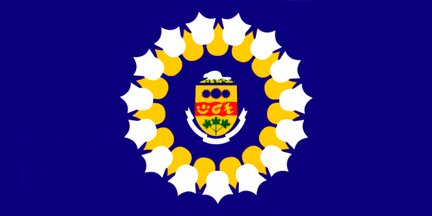
- October 24, 2022
- Turnout: 18.42%
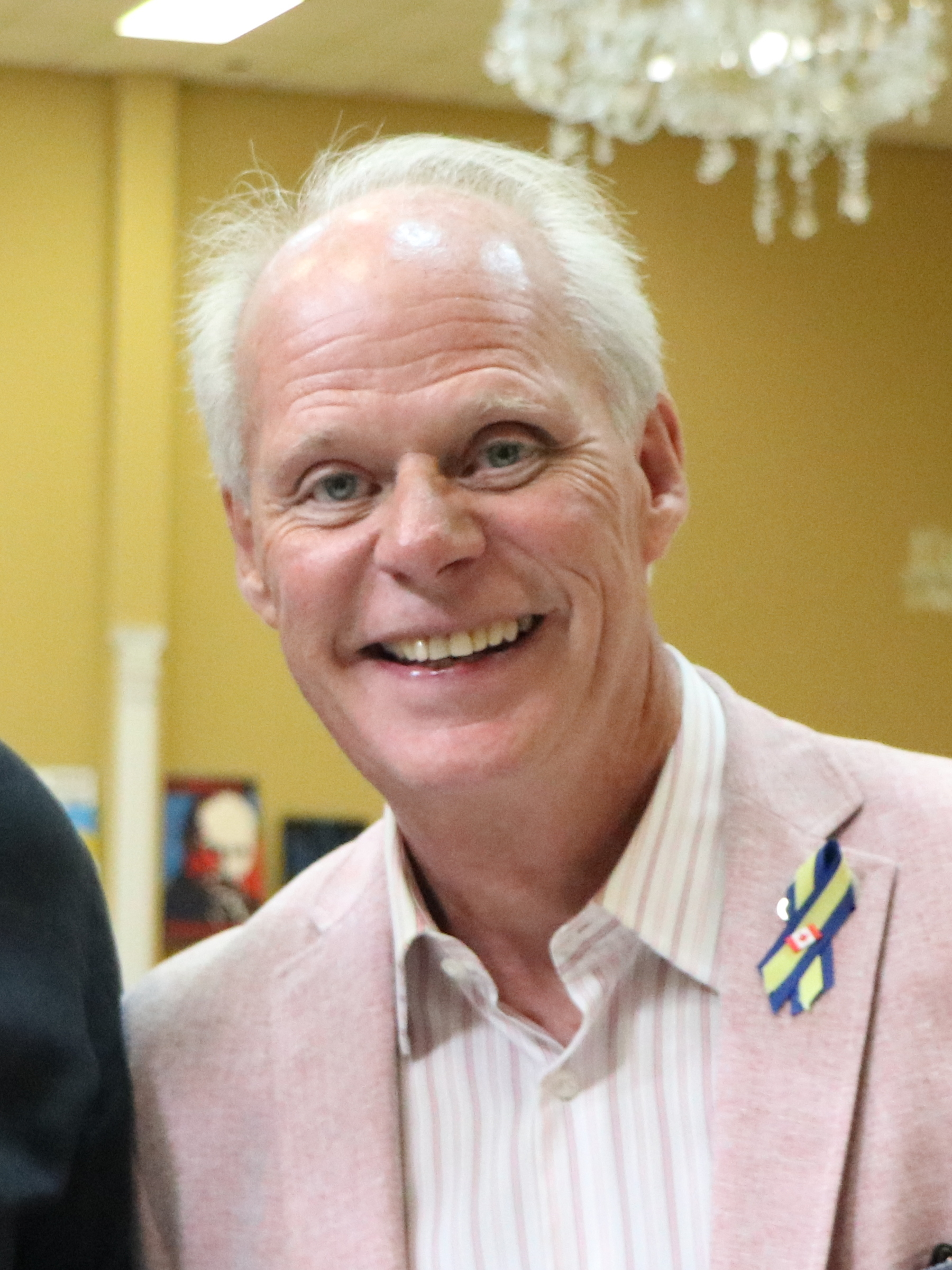

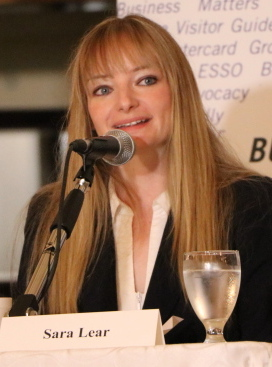

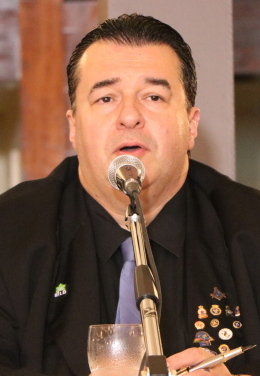
Candidate	Dan Carter	Sara Lear	Joe Ingino
Popular vote	14,270	4,748	2,956
Percentage	64.94%	21.61%	13.45%
- Map showing the winning candidate's vote strength in each of the 5 wards. The wards shaded in Blue voted a majority for Dan Carter. Pie Charts indicate the total votes received by each candidate per Ward.
Mayor before election
Dan Carter
Elected mayor
Dan Carter

Mayor Dan Carter won re-election.

Candidate	Vote	%
Dan Carter (X)	14,270	64.94
Sara Lear	4,728	21.61
Joe Ingino	2,956	13.45

=== Regional & City Councillors ===
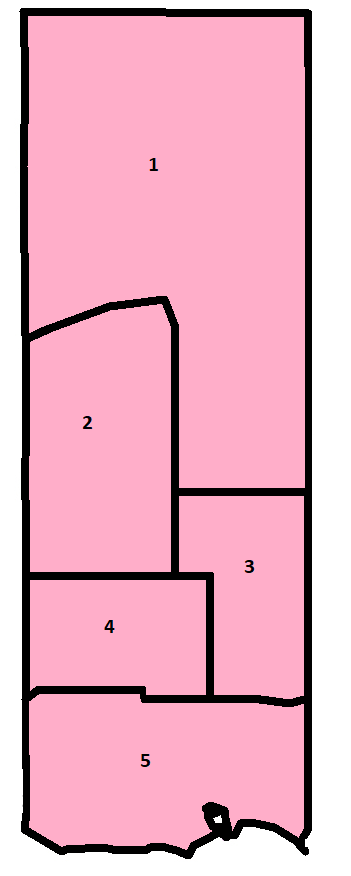
Map of Oshawa's five wards

Candidate	Vote	%
Ward 1
John Neal (X)	1,829	76.21
Christopher Parkinson	322	13.42
Rosaldo Russo	249	10.38
Ward 2
Tito-Dante Marimpietri (X)	2,427	53.17
Lina Fouroughy	2,138	46.83
Ward 3
Bob Chapman (X)	3,793	72.39
Jemma Lambert	1,447	27.61
Ward 4
Rick Kerr (X)	2,467	45.66
Doug Sanders	2,072	38.35
Jeff Davis	864	15.99
Ward 5
Brian Nicholson (X)	1,948	50.60
Alex Down	1,585	41.17
Todd Forbes	317	8.23

=== City Councillors ===
Candidate	Vote	%
Ward 1
Rosemary McConkey (X)	1,101	45.84
Theresa Corless	1,093	45.50
Ahmad Rashed Formuly	208	8.66
Ward 2
Jim Lee	1,509	33.80
Jane Hurst (X)	1,207	27.03
Jonathan Giancroce	792	17.74
Julia McCrea	695	15.57
Amin Ullah	183	4.10
John Sturdy	79	1.77
Ward 3
Bradley Marks (X)	2,694	53.14
Amber Derby	1,307	25.78
Timothy Dobson	763	15.05
Joe Shaw	306	6.04
Ward 4
Derek Giberson (X)	1,497	27.38
Dave Thompson	1,169	21.38
Fred Eismont	1,105	20.21
James Bountrogiannis	1,046	19.13
Mark Logan	651	11.91
Ward 5
John Gray (X)	2,360	62.45
Amanda Jean Lewis	572	15.14
Karrie Lynn Dymond	566	14.98
Taylor Shane Bailey	281	7.44

== Pickering ==
Pickering elected 1 mayor, 3 regional councillors in 1 of 3 wards, and 3 city councillors in 1 of 3 wards.

The following are the official results in the City of Pickering.

=== Mayor ===
2022 Pickering Mayoral election
- October 24, 2022
- Turnout: 27.24%
	KA	JF	BN
Candidate	Kevin Ashe	Janice Frampton	Bradley Nazar
Popular vote	7,867	6,634	5,795
Percentage	38.76%	32.69%	28.55%
- Map showing the winning candidate's vote strength in each of the 3 wards. The wards shaded in Blue voted a plurality for Kevin Ashe, and Cyan voted a plurality for Janice Frampton. Pie Charts indicate the total votes received by each candidate per Ward.
Mayor before election
Dave Ryan
Elected mayor
Kevin Ashe

Incumbent mayor Dave Ryan did not run for re-election. Regional Councillor Kevin Ashe won the election, defeating Janice Frampton and Bradley Nazar.

Candidate	Vote	%
Kevin Ashe	7,867	38.76
Janice Frampton	6,634	32.69
Bradley Nazar	5,795	28.55

=== Regional Councillors ===
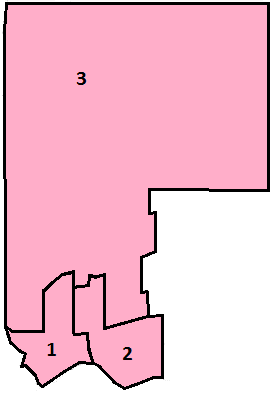
Map of Pickering's three wards

Candidate	Vote	%
Ward 1
Maurice Brenner	3,773	50.74
Tom Hayes	3,663	49.26
Ward 2
Linda Cook	1,996	40.73
Gary Strange	1,837	37.48
Ali Marani	606	12.36
Eileen Higdon	462	9.43
Ward 3
David Pickles (X)	4,298	55.50
Peter Rodrigues	3,446	44.50

=== City Councillors ===
Candidate	Vote	%
Ward 1
Lisa Robinson	1,634	21.87
James Blair	1,286	17.21
Raveena Rajasingham	973	13.02
Karen Sloan	942	12.61
Anthony Michael Yacub	932	12.47
Tony Harold	811	10.86
Zeynab Kazi	477	6.38
Jeanine Soligo	416	5.57
Ward 2
Mara Nagy	1,722	34.81
Dave Currie	910	18.39
Ayesha Sardar	755	15.26
Nancy Van Rooy	698	14.11
Frank McGillan	477	9.64
George David Turner	385	7.78
Ward 3
Shaheen Butt (X)	3,777	47.91
Darshan Sritharan	2,498	31.68
Damian Williams	1,435	18.20
Ali Naqvi	174	2.21

== Scugog ==
Scugog elected 1 mayor, 1 regional councillor, and 5 local councillors in 1 of 5 wards.

The following are the official results in the Township of Scugog.

=== Mayor ===
Incumbent mayor Bobbie Drew did not run for re-election. Regional Councillor Wilma Wotten won the election by acclamation.

Candidate	Vote	%
Wilma Wotten	Acclaimed	

=== Regional Councillor ===
Map of Scugog's five wards

Candidate	Vote	%
Ian McDougall	Acclaimed	

=== Local Councillors ===
Candidate	Vote	%
Ward 1
David LeRoy	Acclaimed	
Ward 2
Janna Guido (X)	Acclaimed	
Ward 3
Robert Rock (X)	Acclaimed	
Ward 4
Harold Wright	Acclaimed	
Ward 5
Terry Coyne	634	45.68
Ivo Finotti	386	27.81
Imran Mohammad	368	26.51

== Uxbridge ==
Uxbridge elected 1 mayor, 1 regional councillor, and 5 local councillors in 1 of 5 wards.

The following are the official results in the Township of Uxbridge.

=== Mayor ===
Mayor Dave Barton won re-election by acclamation.

Candidate	Vote	%
Dave Barton (X)	Acclaimed	

=== Regional Councillor ===
Map of Uxbridge's five wards

Candidate	Vote	%
Bruce Garrod	4,468	68.64
Jack Ballinger	2,041	31.36

=== Local Councillors ===
Candidate	Vote	%
Ward 1
Pamela Beach (X)	654	53.34
Dominic Morrissey	572	46.66
Ward 2
Gordon Shreeve	745	51.77
Patrick Molloy	694	48.23
Ward 3
Zed Pickering	668	56.47
John Haddock	329	27.81
J.P. Herold	186	15.72
Ward 4
Willie Popp (X)	Acclaimed	
Ward 5
Todd Snooks (X)	699	56.19
Christine McKenzie	418	33.60
Erin Jones	127	10.21

== Whitby ==
Whitby elected 1 mayor, 4 regional councillors, and 4 local councillors in 1 of 4 wards.

The following are the official results in the Town of Whitby.

=== Mayor ===
2022 Whitby Mayoral election
- October 24, 2022
- Turnout: 23.26%
	ER	DN	EG
Candidate	Elizabeth Roy	Deidre Newman	Evan Griffiths
Popular vote	12,654	9,355	1,517
Percentage	53.79%	39.76%	6.45%
Mayor before election
Don Mitchell
Elected mayor
Elizabeth Roy

Mayor Don Mitchell did not run for re-election. Regional Councillor Elizabeth Roy won the election, defeating Local Councillor for Ward 2 West Deidre Newman.

Candidate	Vote	%
Elizabeth Roy	12,654	53.79
Deidre Newman	9,355	39.76
Evan Griffiths	1,517	6.45

=== Regional Councillors ===
Elected by plurality block voting, with each voter casting up to four votes.

Candidate	Vote	%
Rhonda Mulcahy (X)	12,947	17.81
Chris Leahy (X)	12,541	17.26
Steve Yamada (X)	12,287	16.91
Maleeha Shahid	11,441	15.74
Ron Kapuscinski	8,531	11.74
Michael G. Emm	7,683	10.57
Vasu Mallula	3,788	5.21
Dave Sansom	3,457	4.76

=== Local Councillors ===
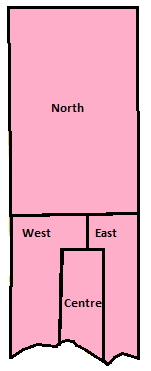
Map of Whitby's four wards

Candidate	Vote	%
Ward 1 North
Steve Lee (X)	Acclaimed	
Ward 2 West
Matt Cardwell	2,995	42.93
Lori Lopes	2,431	34.84
Anjali Thorve	941	13.49
Kamlesh Partel	408	5.85
Jim Skenderis	202	2.90
Ward 3 Centre
Niki Lundquist	2,492	54.84
Joanne Drumm (X)	2,052	45.16
Ward 4 East
Victoria Bozinovski	2,431	39.79
John Rinella	2,166	35.45
PG Case	860	14.08
Rajat Sharma	653	10.69
