= York—Durham =

Federal electoral district in Ontario, Canada

Ontario electoral district
- Interactive map of riding boundaries from the 2025 federal election

Federal electoral district
- Legislature: House of Commons
- District created: 2023

Demographics
- Population (2021): 116,560
- Electors (2025): 99,112
- Census division(s): Durham, York
- Census subdivision(s): Whitchurch-Stouffville (part), Georgina, Scugog, Uxbridge, Brock, Chippewas of Georgina Island, Mississaugas of Scugog Island

York—Durham is a federal electoral district in central Ontario, Canada. It came into effect upon the call of the 2025 Canadian federal election.

== Geography ==
The district will include Georgina, part of Whitchurch-Stouffville, Brock, Scugog, Uxbridge, Chippewas of Georgina Island First Nation, and Mississaugas of Scugog Island First Nation.

== Demographics ==
According to the 2021 Canadian census

Languages: 87.7% English, 1.3% French, 1.3% Mandarin, 1.2% Cantonese

Religions: 50.1% Christian (18.5% Catholic, 8.1% United Church, 5.2% Anglican, 2.2% Presbyterian, 1.7% Christian Orthodox, 1.5% Baptist, 12.9% Other), 45.1% No religion, 1.8% Muslim

Median income: $44,000 (2020)

Average income: $59,300 (2020)

Panethnic groups in York—Durham (2021)
Panethnic group	2021	
Panethnic group	Pop.	%
European (Note: Statistic includes all persons that did not make up part of a visible minority or an indigenous identity.)	98,725	85.7%
East Asian (Note: Statistic includes total responses of "Chinese", "Korean", and "Japanese" under visible minority section on census.)	4,765	4.14%
South Asian	2,730	2.37%
Indigenous	3,035	2.63%
African	1,460	1.27%
Southeast Asian (Note: Statistic includes total responses of "Filipino" and "Southeast Asian" under visible minority section on census.)	1,415	1.23%
Middle Eastern (Note: Statistic includes total responses of "West Asian" and "Arab" under visible minority section on census.)	1,405	1.22%
Latin American	695	0.6%
Other/multiracial (Note: Statistic includes total responses of "Visible minority, n.i.e." and "Multiple visible minorities" under visible minority section on census.)	960	0.83%
Total responses	115,200	98.83%
Total population	116,560	100%
Notes: Totals greater than 100% due to multiple origin responses. Demographics based on 2022 Canadian federal electoral redistribution riding boundaries.

== History ==
Parliament	Years	Member	Party
York—Durham; Riding created from Durham, Haliburton—Kawartha Lakes—Brock, Markham—Stouffville, Pickering—Uxbridge, and York—Simcoe
45th	2025–present	Jacob Mantle	Conservative

== Election results ==
2025 Canadian federal election
** Preliminary results — Not yet official **
Party	Candidate	Votes	%	±%	Expenditures
Conservative	Jacob Mantle	39,726	55.52	+3.77	
Liberal	Robert Grossi	28,317	39.57	+11.07	
New Democratic	Justin Graham	1,821	2.54	–10.03	
People's	Patricia Conlin	900	1.26	–5.11	
Green	Matt Pearce	790	1.10	+0.55	
Total valid votes/expense limit					
Total rejected ballots					
Turnout		71,554	71.76		
Eligible voters		99,713			
Conservative notional hold		Swing		–3.65	
Source: Elections Canada

2021 federal election redistributed results
Party	Vote	%
Conservative	30,324	51.75
Liberal	16,701	28.50
New Democratic	7,364	12.57
People's	3,731	6.37
Green	325	0.55
Others	150	0.26

== See also ==
- List of Canadian federal electoral districts
