= Corneliu Chisu =

Romanian-born Canadian politician

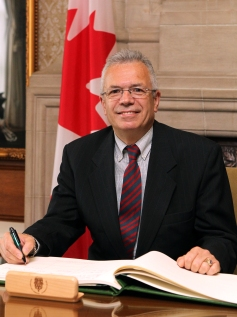

Member of Parliament for Pickering—Scarborough East
- In office May 2, 2011 – August 4, 2015
- Preceded by: Dan McTeague
- Succeeded by: Jennifer O'Connell (Pickering—Uxbridge)

Personal details
- Born: February 13, 1949 (age 77) Satu Mare, Romania
- Party: People's
- Other political affiliations: Conservative (2011-2019)

Military service
- Rank: Major
- Unit: Royal Corps of Military Engineers, 2 Area Support Group
- Battles/wars: NATO missions in the Balkans and Afghanistan

Corneliu Emil Eugen Chișu (born February 13, 1949) is a Romanian-born Canadian politician, who was elected to the House of Commons of Canada in the 2011 election. He represented the riding of Pickering—Scarborough East as a member of the Conservative Party before being defeated by Jennifer O'Connell in the 2015 Canadian federal election in the redistributed riding of Pickering—Uxbridge.

== Background ==
Chisu was born in Satu Mare, Romania, and he attended high school at Mihai Eminescu National College. He graduated from Polytechnic University of Bucharest in 1971 with a degree in engineering physics. He worked as a researcher at the Research Energy Institute in Bucharest and as a teaching assistant at the Polytechnic University while pursuing his Ph.D., specializing in the field of photovoltaic conversion of solar energy. In 1976 he joined the Italian Trade Commission in Bucharest as a trade analyst. He emigrated to Italy in 1981, and to Canada in 1982.

In Canada, Chisu worked at the Italian Trade Commission in Toronto as a senior trade analyst in the field of industrial cooperation in the manufactured goods area, and pursued his Master of Engineering degree at the University of Toronto, from which he graduated in 1988. In 1989 he was certified as a professional engineer.

He also acted for several years as the honorary consul of the Republic of Moldova in Toronto. He was recognized for his work by the President of Moldova, who conferred on him the Medal of Civic Merit in 2012.

For his work in strengthening the relations between Hungary and Canada, Chisu in 2014 received a Knights Cross of the Hungarian Order of Merit.

== Military service ==
In 1990 Chisu joined the Canadian Forces, and was commissioned as an officer in the Royal Corps of Military Engineers, first in the reserve, then in the regular force. In 2002 he graduated from the Canadian Staff College in Kingston, Ontario. While serving in the reserve, he was promoted to the rank of captain, and later that year, received the Canadian Forces' Decoration. While serving in the regular force, he was posted in 2003 as a construction engineer officer at the Canadian Forces Training Centre in Meaford, Ontario. In 2004 he was deployed in the Balkans in Banja Luka as the engineering advisor to the Commander of NW Brigade. While serving in the Balkans, he received the NATO Medal and the Canadian Peacekeeping Service Medal.

In 2007 he was deployed to Kandahar, Afghanistan as the second in command to the Engineer Support Unit, where he contributed to the infrastructure projects on the airfield and forward operating bases and contributed to the improvement of the Military Role 3 Hospital. While serving in Afghanistan, he received the General Campaign Star Afghanistan Medal.

In 2008 he was promoted to the rank of Major and was posted to Petawawa as the 2 Area Support Group engineer. In 2009 he retired from the Regular Force, and joined the Cadet Corps as a Cadet Officer cadre. While serving in the Cadet Corps, he received the Canadian Forces' Decoration First clasp (CD1) after 22 years of service in the Canadian Forces. He was one of thirteen Members of Parliament who had military service backgrounds as of 2012, and was the only sitting MP who was a veteran of the conflict in Afghanistan during his tenure.

== Politics ==
Chisu ran for election in the riding of Pickering—Scarborough East in the 2011 federal election. He beat incumbent Dan McTeague by 1,207 votes. During the campaign, Chisu did not appear at an all-candidates debate for the riding. One of the organizers of the debate alleged that the Conservative party's national headquarters instructed its candidate to not show up. However, Chisu's campaign office replied that it was more important for their candidate to be out campaigning rather than spend time preparing for a debate.

During the 2015 election campaign Chisu entered the debate on the future of the Pickering Airport lands that had previously been expropriated by the Government of Canada. He expressed support for an airport on the lands in contrast to the position taken by all his opponents.

In the 2015 Canadian federal election he was defeated by the Liberal candidate Jennifer O'Connell in the redistributed riding of Pickering—Uxbridge.

In 2017, Chisu was one of the applicants for appointment to Toronto City Council to succeed the late Ron Moeser in Ward 44.

== Electoral record ==
2021 Canadian federal election: Pickering—Uxbridge
Party	Candidate	Votes	%	±%	Expenditures
Liberal	Jennifer O'Connell	27,271	46.9	-4.1	$63,374.89
Conservative	Jacob Mantle	20,976	36.1	+7.0	$113,717.90
New Democratic	Eileen Higdon	7,396	13.1	+1.2	$3,884.61
People's	Corneliu Chisu	2,328	4.0	+2.0	$2,394.19
Total valid votes/expense limit		58,167	–	–	$121,844.79
Total rejected ballots		302			
Turnout		58,469	62.16		
Eligible voters		94,059			
Source: Elections Canada

2019 Canadian federal election: Pickering—Uxbridge
Party	Candidate	Votes	%	±%	Expenditures
Liberal	Jennifer O'Connell	32,387	51.0	+0.7	$79,048.14
Conservative	Cyma Musarat	18,462	29.1	-9.1	$56,879.42
New Democratic	Eileen Higdon	7,582	11.9	+2.7	$9,433.88
Green	Peter Forint	3,799	6.0	+3.7	$7,976.00
People's	Corneliu Chisu	1,265	2.0		$7,989.04
Total valid votes/expense limit		63,495	100.0		
Total rejected ballots		407			
Turnout		63,902	68.9		
Eligible voters		92,699			
Liberal hold		Swing		+4.90	
Source: Elections Canada

2015 Canadian federal election: Pickering—Uxbridge
Party	Candidate	Votes	%	±%	Expenditures
Liberal	Jennifer O'Connell	29,110	50.30	+16.73	$90,112.46
Conservative	Corneliu Chisu	22,084	38.19	-7.79	$119,840.70
New Democratic	Pamela Downward	5,339	9.21	-6.54	–
Green	Anthony Jordan Navarro	1,327	2.31	-2.21	$4,275.04
Total valid votes/Expense limit		59,159	100.0		$223,459.17
Total rejected ballots		222	0.3%	–	
Turnout		59,381	–	–	
Eligible voters		85,794			
Source: Elections Canada

2011 Canadian federal election: Pickering—Scarborough East
Party	Candidate	Votes	%	±%	Expenditures
Conservative	Corneliu Chisu	19,220	40.11	+7.66	
Liberal	Dan McTeague	18,013	37.59	-12.10	
New Democratic	Andrea Moffat	8,932	18.64	+8.05	
Green	Kevin Smith	1,751	3.65	-2.91	
Total valid votes/Expense limit		47,916	100.00		
Total rejected ballots		156	0.32	-0.02	
Turnout		48,072	62.01	+1.79	
Eligible voters		77,522	–	–	
