= Jacob Mantle =

Canadian politician

Jacob Mantle MP

Member of Parliament for York—Durham
- Incumbent
- Assumed office April 28, 2025
- Preceded by: riding created

Personal details
- Born: 1988 (age 37–38) Uxbridge, Ontario
- Party: Conservative

Thomas Jacob Mantle (born 1988) MP is a Canadian politician, who was elected to the Canadian House of Commons in the 2025 federal election. He represents York—Durham as a member of the Conservative Party.

== Background ==
Mantle became interested early in his life when he began working a summer internship for Bev Oda, a retired Durham Member of Parliament and former Minister of Canadian Heritage, and a legislative assistant to John O'Toole, Member of Provincial Parliament for Durham. Mantle attended Queen's University in Kingston to study Political Studies, where he served as part of the student council and was known for being budget-conscious, helping turn around multiple debt-ridden projects on campus.

== Controversies ==
In October 2008, Jacob Mantle, then serving as President of the Arts and Science Undergraduate Society (ASUS) at Queen's University, faced controversy over a Facebook comment he made. Responding to a friend's photo of two women wearing headscarves and sunglasses, Mantle commented: "I like your Taliban picture." The remark was widely condemned as racist and Islamophobic by student groups and media outlets.

Mantle, after much public and private pressure, issued a public apology, stating that he did not intend to cause harm and expressing remorse for the impact of his words.

== Politics ==
After graduation, Mantle ran for election and won a seat as the Ward 4 councillor in Uxbridge, where he grew up. At the age of 23 when he started his term, Mantle became the youngest member of a municipal council in the Greater Toronto Area and the youngest councillor in history for Uxbridge. While on the Uxbridge council, Mantle served as the Chair of the Sustainability, Watershed and Conservation Committee and advocated for the construction of the Uxbridge Rotary Skate Park. After four years, Mantle did not seek re-election to graduate law school and spend time with his new wife, Megan.

Mantle graduated from Queen's University with a law degree, where he worked for Osler, Hoskin & Harcourt specialising in international trade law, namely trade disputes, economic regulations, and trade sanction disputes.

In April 2025, Mantle was elected as Member of Parliament for York—Durham as the Conservative candidate, with over 55% of the vote.

== Electoral record ==
2025 Canadian federal election: York—Durham
** Preliminary results — Not yet official **
Party	Candidate	Votes	%	±%	Expenditures
Conservative	Jacob Mantle	39,726	55.52	+3.77	
Liberal	Robert Grossi	28,317	39.57	+11.07	
New Democratic	Justin Graham	1,821	2.54	–10.03	
People's	Patricia Conlin	900	1.26	–5.11	
Green	Matt Pearce	790	1.10	+0.55	
Total valid votes/expense limit					
Total rejected ballots					
Turnout		71,554	71.76		
Eligible voters		99,713			
Conservative notional hold		Swing		–3.65	
Source: Elections Canada

2021 Canadian federal election: Pickering—Uxbridge
Party	Candidate	Votes	%	±%	Expenditures
Liberal	Jennifer O'Connell	27,271	46.9	-4.1	$63,374.89
Conservative	Jacob Mantle	20,976	36.1	+7.0	$113,717.90
New Democratic	Eileen Higdon	7,396	13.1	+1.2	$3,884.61
People's	Corneliu Chisu	2,328	4.0	+2.0	$2,394.19
Total valid votes/expense limit		58,167	–	–	$121,844.79
Total rejected ballots		302			
Turnout		58,469	62.16		
Eligible voters		94,059			
Source: Elections Canada
