= Pickering—Brooklin =

Federal electoral district in Ontario, Canada

Ontario electoral district
- Interactive map of riding boundaries from the 2025 federal election
- Coordinates: 44.042°N 79.181°W

Federal electoral district
- Legislature: House of Commons
MP
Juanita Nathan
Liberal
- District created: 2013
- First contested: 2015
- Last contested: 2025
- District webpage: profile, map

Demographics
- Population (2021): 120,742
- Electors (2015): 84,997
- Area (km²): 687
- Pop. density (per km²): 175.8
- Census division: Durham
- Census subdivision(s): Whitby (part), Pickering

Pickering—Brooklin (formerly Pickering—Uxbridge) is a federal electoral district in Ontario. It consists of the City of Pickering and the Township of Uxbridge.

Pickering—Uxbridge was created by the 2012 federal electoral boundaries redistribution and was legally defined in the 2013 representation order. It came into effect upon the call of the 42nd Canadian federal election, scheduled for 19 October 2015. It was created out of parts of Pickering—Scarborough East, Ajax—Pickering and Durham.

Following the 2022 Canadian federal electoral redistribution the riding was renamed Pickering—Brooklin. The new riding lost the Township of Uxbridge to the new York—Durham riding, and gained the portion of the Town of Whitby north of Highway 407 from the Whitby riding. It was contested under the new name and boundaries in the 2025 federal election.

== Demographics ==
According to the 2021 Canadian census, 2023 representation

Racial groups: 53.2% White, 18.1% South Asian, 10.2% Black, 3.6% Filipino, 3.0% Chinese, 1.8% West Asian, 1.5% Latin American, 1.4% Arab, 1.2% Indigenous
Languages: 76.6% English, 2.6% Urdu, 2.5% Tamil, 1.7% French, 1.5% Tagalog, 1.2% Persian, 1.1% Spanish, 1.1% Arabic, 1.0% Italian
Religions: 54.3% Christian (25.9% Catholic, 4.2% Anglican, 3.7% Christian Orthodox, 3.5% United Church, 1.8% Pentecostal, 1.5% Presbyterian, 1.3% Baptist, 12.5% Other), 10.5% Muslim, 7.2% Hindu, 25.9% None
Median income: $46,800 (2020)
Average income: $62,750 (2020)

== Members of Parliament ==
This riding has elected the following members of Parliament:

Parliament	Years	Member	Party
Pickering—Uxbridge; Riding created from Ajax—Pickering, Durham and Pickering—Scarborough East
42nd	2015–2019	Jennifer O'Connell	Liberal
43rd	2019–2021	Jennifer O'Connell	Liberal
44th	2021–2025	Jennifer O'Connell	Liberal
Pickering—Brooklin
45th	2025–present	Juanita Nathan	Liberal

== Election results ==
Graph of general election results in Pickering—Uxbridge (minor parties that never got 2% of the vote or didn't run consistently are omitted)

=== Pickering—Brooklin, 2023 representation order ===
2025 Canadian federal election
Party	Candidate	Votes	%	±%
Liberal	Juanita Nathan	38,578	54.16	+6.00
Conservative	Alicia Vianga	29,320	41.16	+6.90
New Democratic	Jamie Nye	1,838	2.58	-10.90
People's	Lisa Robinson	639	0.90	-2.95
Green	Andrea Wood	535	0.75	+0.50
Centrist	Zainab Rana	322	0.45	N/A
Total valid votes		71,232	99.48	
Total rejected ballots		371	0.52	-0.00
Turnout		71,603	70.40	+10.01
Eligible voters		101,706		
Liberal notional hold		Swing		-0.45
Source: Elections Canada

2021 federal election redistributed results
Party	Vote	%
Liberal	27,011	48.16
Conservative	19,217	34.26
New Democratic	7,562	13.48
People's	2,158	3.85
Green	139	0.25
Total valid votes	56,087	99.48
Rejected ballots	294	0.52
Registered voters/ estimated turnout	93,366	60.39

=== Pickering—Uxbridge, 2013 representation order ===
2021 Canadian federal election: Pickering—Uxbridge
Party	Candidate	Votes	%	±%	Expenditures
Liberal	Jennifer O'Connell	27,271	46.9	-4.1	$63,374.89
Conservative	Jacob Mantle	20,976	36.1	+7.0	$113,717.90
New Democratic	Eileen Higdon	7,396	13.1	+1.2	$3,884.61
People's	Corneliu Chisu	2,328	4.0	+2.0	$2,394.19
Total valid votes/expense limit		58,167	–	–	$121,844.79
Total rejected ballots		302			
Turnout		58,469	62.16		
Eligible voters		94,059			
Source: Elections Canada

2019 Canadian federal election: Pickering—Uxbridge
Party	Candidate	Votes	%	±%	Expenditures
Liberal	Jennifer O'Connell	32,387	51.0	+0.7	$79,048.14
Conservative	Cyma Musarat	18,462	29.1	-9.1	$56,879.42
New Democratic	Eileen Higdon	7,582	11.9	+2.7	$9,433.88
Green	Peter Forint	3,799	6.0	+3.7	$7,976.00
People's	Corneliu Chisu	1,265	2.0		$7,989.04
Total valid votes/expense limit		63,495	100.0		
Total rejected ballots		407			
Turnout		63,902	68.9		
Eligible voters		92,699			
Liberal hold		Swing		+4.90	
Source: Elections Canada

2015 Canadian federal election: Pickering—Uxbridge
Party	Candidate	Votes	%	±%	Expenditures
Liberal	Jennifer O'Connell	29,757	50.30	+16.73	$92,326.80
Conservative	Corneliu Chisu	22,591	38.19	-7.79	$119,840.70
New Democratic	Pamela Downward	5,446	9.21	-6.54	$12,890.87
Green	Anthony Jordan Navarro	1,365	2.31	-2.21	$4,275.04
Total valid votes/Expense limit		59,159	100.0		$224,063.76
Total rejected ballots		222	0.3%	–	
Turnout		59,381	–	–	
Eligible voters		85,794			
Source: Elections Canada

2011 federal election redistributed results
Party	Vote	%
Conservative	22,574	45.98
Liberal	16,480	33.57
New Democratic	7,731	15.75
Green	2,217	4.52
Others	95	0.19

== See also ==
- List of Canadian electoral districts
- Historical federal electoral districts of Canada
