= Pickering—Scarborough East (provincial electoral district) =

Coordinates: 43.81°N 79.14°W

Ontario electoral district
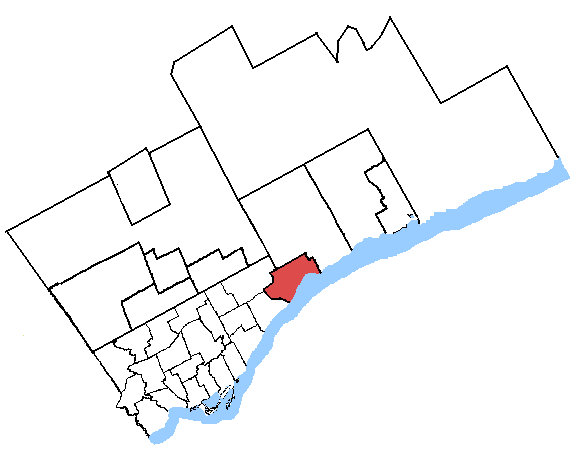
- Pickering—Scarborough East in relation to other Greater Toronto ridings

Defunct provincial electoral district
- Legislature: Legislative Assembly of Ontario
- District created: 2003
- District abolished: 2018
- First contested: 2007
- Last contested: 2014

Demographics
- Population (2006): 106,602
- Electors (2011): 76,709
- Area (km²): 52
- Census division(s): Durham, Toronto
- Census subdivision(s): Pickering, Scarborough

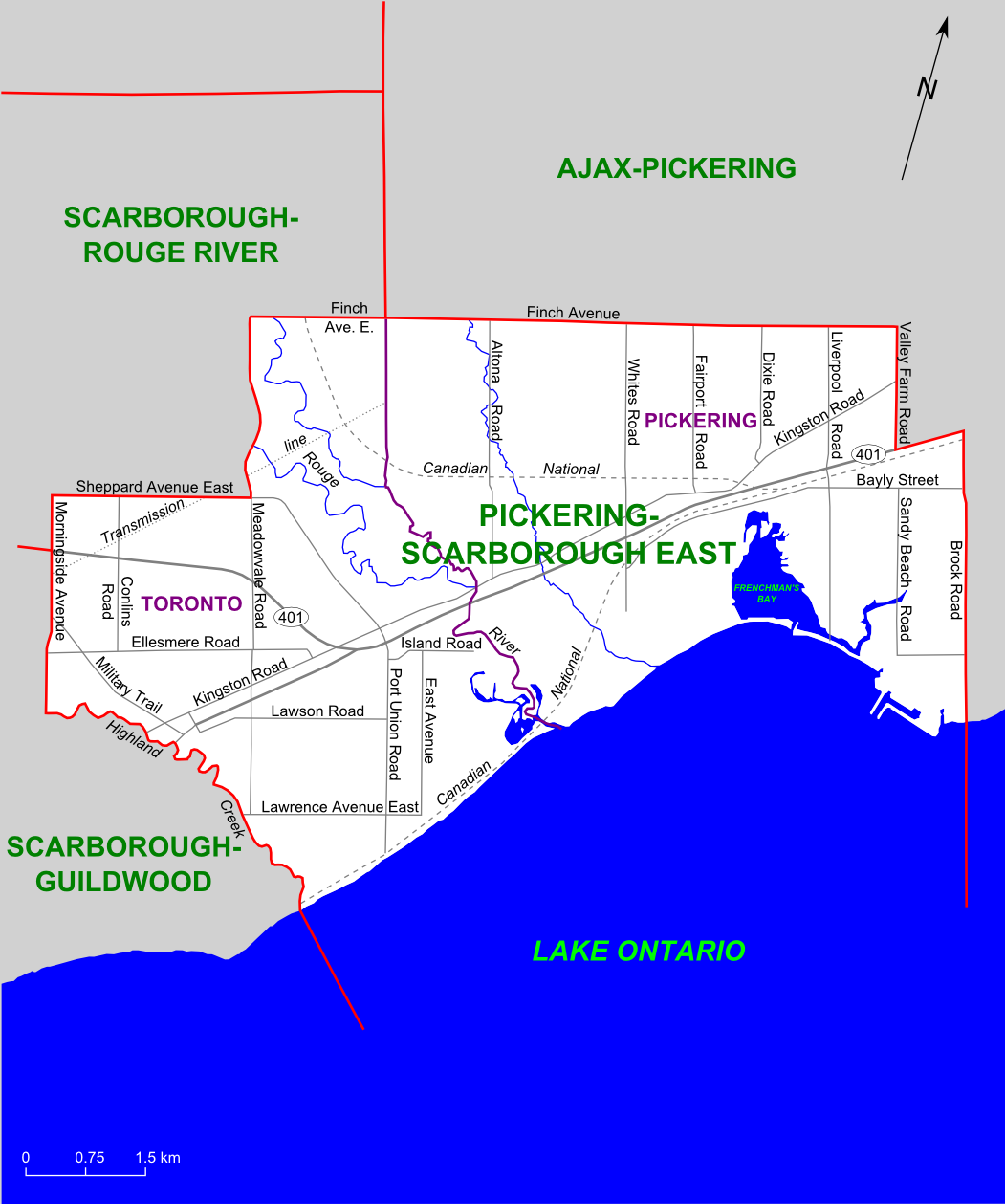
Map of Pickering-Scarborough East

Pickering—Scarborough East was a provincial electoral district in Ontario, Canada, that was represented in the Legislative Assembly of Ontario between 2007 and 2018.

The district was created in 2003 from 44.1% of Pickering—Ajax—Uxbridge, 39.7% of Scarborough East, and 0.1% of Scarborough—Rouge River ridings.

The district consisted of the southwest part of the city of Pickering and the southeast part of the Scarborough district of Toronto.

Specifically, it consisted of the part of the City of Pickering lying south and west of a line drawn from the western city limit east along Finch Avenue, south along Valley Farm Road, northeast along Highway 401 and south along Brock Road to the southern city limit; and the part of the City of Toronto lying south and east of a line drawn from the eastern city limit west along Finch Avenue East, south along Meadowvale Road, west along Sheppard Avenue East, south along Morningside Avenue and southeast along Highland Creek to Lake Ontario.

In 2018, the district was dissolved into Pickering—Uxbridge and Scarborough—Rouge Park.

== Demographics ==
(According to the 2006 Canadian census)

Ethnic groups: 61.3% White, 13.5% South Asian, 10.4% Black, 4.1% Filipino, 3.2% Chinese
Languages: 74.6% English, 1.3% French, 23.9% Other
Average income: $31 920

== Members of Provincial Parliament ==
Pickering—Scarborough East
Assembly	Years	Member	Party
Riding created from Pickering—Ajax—Uxbridge, Scarborough East and Scarborough—Rouge River
39th	2007–2011	Wayne Arthurs	Liberal
40th	2011–2014	Tracy MacCharles	Liberal
41st	2014–2018	Tracy MacCharles	Liberal
Riding merged into Scarborough—Rouge Park and Pickering—Uxbridge

== Election results ==
2014 Ontario general election
Party	Candidate	Votes	%	±%
Liberal	Tracy MacCharles	23,206	51.96	+5.30
Progressive Conservative	Kevin Gaudet	12,638	28.30	–5.12
New Democratic	Eileen Higdon	6,600	14.78	–1.69
Green	Anthony Navarro	1,564	3.50	+0.69
Libertarian	Scott Hoefig	463	1.04	+0.39
Freedom	Matt Oliver	191	0.43	–
Total valid votes		44,662	98.81	
Total rejected, unmarked and declined ballots		536	1.19	+0.76
Turnout		45,198	54.77	+5.08
Eligible voters		82,518		
Liberal hold		Swing		+5.21
Source: Elections Ontario

2011 Ontario general election
Party	Candidate	Votes	%	±%
Liberal	Tracy MacCharles	18,201	46.66	–1.96
Progressive Conservative	Kevin Gaudet	13,033	33.41	+1.71
New Democratic	Nerissa Cariño	6,424	16.47	+5.24
Green	Kevin Smith	1,096	2.81	–3.52
Libertarian	Heath Thomas	252	0.65	–0.28
Total valid votes		39,006	99.58	
Total rejected, unmarked and declined ballots		166	0.42	–0.27
Turnout		39,172	49.69	–4.32
Eligible voters		78,835		
Liberal hold		Swing		–1.84
Source: Elections Ontario

2007 Ontario general election
Party	Candidate	Votes	%
Liberal	Wayne Arthurs	19,762	48.63
Progressive Conservative	Dianna Hall	12,884	31.70
New Democratic	Andrea Moffat	4,563	11.23
Green	Anita Lalchan	2,572	6.33
Libertarian	Josh Insang	375	0.92
Independent	John Newell	275	0.68
Family Coalition	Mitchel Andrew Persaud	210	0.52
Total valid votes		40,641	99.31
Total rejected, unmarked and declined ballots		284	0.69
Turnout		40,925	54.01
Eligible voters		75,770	
Liberal pickup new district.			
Source: Elections Ontario

== 2007 electoral reform referendum ==
2007 Ontario electoral reform referendum
Side	Votes	%
First Past the Post	24,849	63.5
Mixed member proportional	14,274	36.5
Total valid votes	39,123	100.0

== Sources ==
- Elections Ontario Past Election Results
