= Wayne Arthurs (politician) =

Canadian politician

Ontario MPP
- In office 2007–2011
- Preceded by: New riding
- Succeeded by: Tracy MacCharles
- Constituency: Pickering—Scarborough East
- In office 2003–2007
- Preceded by: Janet Ecker
- Succeeded by: Riding abolished
- Constituency: Pickering—Ajax—Uxbridge

Mayor of Pickering, Ontario
- In office 1988-2003
- Preceded by: John E. Anderson
- Succeeded by: Dave Ryan

City Councillor in Pickering, Ontario
- In office 1982-1988

Personal details
- Born: 1948 (age 77–78)
- Party: Liberal
- Education: York University; University of Toronto
- Occupation: Teacher

Wayne Arthurs (born c. 1948) is a former politician in Ontario, Canada. He was a Liberal member of the Legislative Assembly of Ontario from 2003 to 2011 who represented the ridings of Pickering—Ajax—Uxbridge and Pickering—Scarborough East.

== Background ==
Arthurs has a Bachelor of Arts degree from York University and a Bachelor of Education degree from the University of Toronto. He worked as a teacher and a guidance counsellor.

== Politics ==
Arthurs was a member of the Pickering municipal council from 1982 to 1988. In 1988 he was elected as mayor of the city. He defeated former Conservative MPP George Ashe. He stayed on as mayor until 2003. He was also a member of the Durham Regional Council.

Arthurs was elected to the Ontario legislature in the provincial election of 2003, defeating high-profile Progressive Conservative cabinet minister Janet Ecker by 1010 votes. Arthurs was still mayor of Pickering at the time of the election and was still registered for the municipal election that was being held later in 2003. Arthurs resigned as mayor soon after he won the election. He was re-elected in 2007.

During his time in office Arthurs remained on the backbench but served as Parliamentary Assistant to several ministries including Minister of Finance and Minister of Intergovernmental Affairs. In 2010 he announced his intention to retire from politics.

== Electoral record ==
2003 Ontario general election
Party	Candidate	Votes	%	±%
Liberal	Wayne Arthurs	24,970	45.76	+11.48
Progressive Conservative	Janet Ecker	23,960	43.91	-14.28
New Democratic	Vern Edwards	3,690	6.76	+1.05
Green	Adam Duncan	1,946	3.57	+2.14

2007 Ontario general election
Party	Candidate	Votes	%	±%
Liberal	Wayne Arthurs	19,762	48.6	+2.84
Progressive Conservative	Diana Hall	12,927	31.8	-12.11
New Democratic	Andrea Moffat	4,531	11.1	+4.34
Green	Anita Lalchan	2,575	6.3	+2.73
Libertarian	Josh Insang	380	0.9	
Independent	John Newell	268	0.7	
Family Coalition	Mitchell Andrew Persaud	229	0.6	
