= Dave Ryan (politician) =

Canadian politician

His Worship David Ryan

Mayor of Pickering
- In office December 1, 2003 – November 15, 2022
- Preceded by: Wayne Arthurs
- Succeeded by: Kevin Ashe

Pickering City Councillor
- In office December 1, 1994 – December 1, 2003
- Preceded by: Doug Wellam
- Succeeded by: Kevin Ashe
- Constituency: Ward 1

Personal details
- Born: 1946 or 1947 (age 78–79)
- Party: Independent
- Other political affiliations: Ontario Liberal Party
- Spouse: Anne
- Children: 2
- Occupation: Politician

David Ryan (born c. 1946) is a Canadian politician. He served as the mayor of Pickering from 2003 to 2022, and was the longest-serving mayor of the city. As mayor, he also sat on Durham Regional Council.

== Career ==
Ryan moved to Pickering in 1985. He worked in general business and management at IBM for 33 years before retiring to run for mayor of Pickering in 2003.

Ryan was elected to Pickering City Council for the first time in 1994. Ryan ran for the Ontario Liberal Party in the riding of Pickering—Ajax—Uxbridge in the 1999 Ontario general election, but lost to Progressive Conservative Janet Ecker by nearly 12,000 votes.

After mayor Wayne Arthurs retired in 2003, Ryan ran against regional councillor Doug Dickerson for mayor of the city. The main issue of the race was over the development of the Duffins Rouge Agricultural Preserve, with Ryan supporting development and Dickerson opposing. Ryan defeated Dickerson by nearly 3,000 votes.

Promising to attract more business development to the city, and building infrastructure to the proposed community of Seaton, Ryan defeated John Newell by over 7,000 votes in the 2006 municipal elections. Newell ran on a campaign focused on the environment and against developer influence.

The 2010 mayoral election was especially heated, as Ryan ran against former regional councillor Maurice Brenner, who had filed a multi-million-dollar lawsuit against Ryan in 2009, citing allegations of fraud against him destroyed his political career. Brenner dropped the lawsuit during the campaign, as he felt his reputation was intact. Ryan ended up defeating Brenner by 1,700 votes.

Ryan and Brenner faced off again in the 2014 mayoral election. Ryan ran on a campaign of jobs, transportation and health care, highlighting the city attracting new companies like Search Engine People and expansion of companies like Eco-Tec and Purdue Pharma. He supported building a new hospital in the city, and getting more assistance from other levels of government for infrastructure, like the building of the harbour entrance. He also wanted to bring an arts centre, hotel and convention centre to the city, and expanded services for seniors. In the 2014 election, Ryan easily defeated Brenner by over 7,000 votes.

in the 2018 mayoral election, Ryan faced off against former city councillor and perennial New Democratic Party candidate Eileen Hidgdon. Ryan easily won the race by over 9,000 votes. Job creation, economic development and affordable housing were the main issues of the campaign. Ryan supported building a new airport in the area.

In 2020, Ryan had to take a leave of absence due to a double lung transplant, following a diagnosis of Interstitial Lung Disease.

One of the major projects being undertaken during his mayoralty is the construction of the Pickering City Centre project. During the COVID-19 pandemic in Ontario, Ryan made news for asking Torontonians to avoid travelling to next-door Durham Region (which includes Pickering) to avoid COVID restrictions in that city. He also denounced a car rally in May 2021 that drew hundreds of people to parking lot in the city, despite provincial COVID restrictions.

In 2021, he also called for a pause on "any immediate disruption" for a proposed Amazon distribution centre at the Duffins Creek wetland.

In January 2022, Ryan stated his disappointment that a new regional hospital was going to be built in neighbouring Whitby rather than Pickering. He stated "Pickering will have the largest population in Durham Region and is the only city in the region to not have a major health-care facility".

In April 2022, Ryan announced he was not going to run for re-election in 2022, citing a desire to spend more time with his family. He cited maintaining Pickering as a 'close knit community' as well as the construction of the Pickering Pedestrian Bridge, and the Seaton development as his greatest accomplishments as mayor.
