= William Smith (Ontario politician) =

Canadian politician

The Hon. William Smith
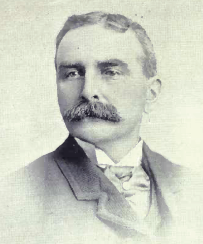

Member of the Canadian Parliament for Ontario South
- In office 1887–1891
- Preceded by: Francis Wayland Glen
- Succeeded by: James Ironside Davidson
- In office 1892–1896
- Preceded by: James Ironside Davidson
- Succeeded by: Leonard Burnett
- In office 1911–1921
- Preceded by: Frederick Luther Fowke
- Succeeded by: Lawson Omar Clifford

Personal details
- Born: November 16, 1847 Columbus, Canada West
- Died: January 22, 1931 (aged 83)
- Party: Conservative

William Smith, PC (November 16, 1847 – January 22, 1931) was a Canadian politician.

Born in Columbus, Canada West, the son of William Smith and Elizabeth Laing, Smith received his early education in the public schools of Columbus after which he continued his studies in Upper Canada College. An agriculturist, Smith was deputy reeve and afterwards reeve of the township of East Whitby. He was also trustee of Columbus School Board for twenty years. He was the Conservative member of the House of Commons of Canada from 1887 to 1891, 1892–1896, and 1911–1921.

== Electoral record ==
1882 Canadian federal election: South riding of Ontario
Party	Candidate	Votes
Liberal	Francis Wayland Glen	1,668
Conservative	William Smith	1,618

1887 Canadian federal election: South riding of Ontario
Party	Candidate	Votes
Conservative	William Smith	2,118
Liberal	Francis Rae	1,931

1891 Canadian federal election: South riding of Ontario
Party	Candidate	Votes
Liberal	James Ironside Davidson	2,042
Conservative	William Smith	2,009

By-election: On election being declared void, 20 February 1892: South riding of Ontario
Party	Candidate	Votes
Conservative	William Smith	acclaimed

1896 Canadian federal election: South riding of Ontario
Party	Candidate	Votes
Liberal	Leonard Burnett	2,165
Conservative	William Smith	2,021

1900 Canadian federal election: South riding of Ontario
Party	Candidate	Votes
Liberal	William Ross	1,970
Conservative	William Smith	1,876
