= Mark Holland =

Canadian politician (born 1974)

The Honourable Mark Holland PC
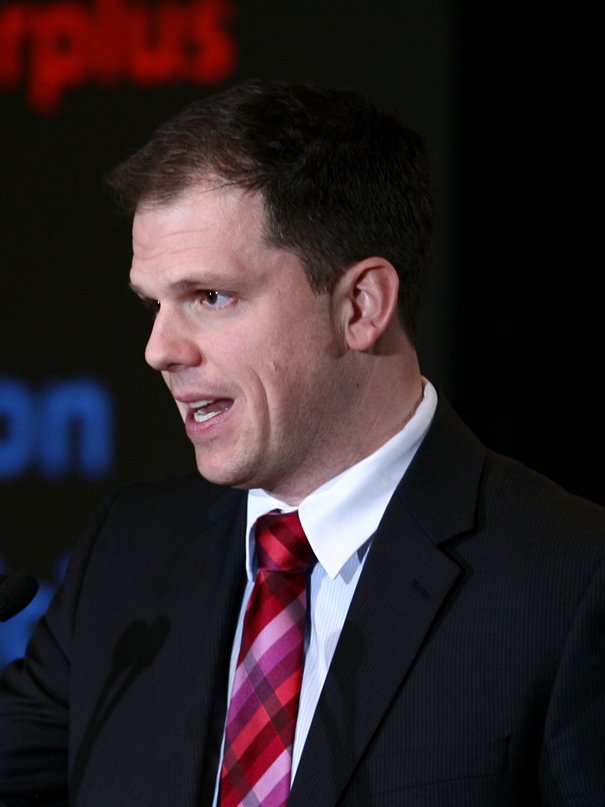
- Holland in 2011

Minister of Health
- In office July 26, 2023 – March 14, 2025
- Prime Minister: Justin Trudeau
- Preceded by: Jean-Yves Duclos
- Succeeded by: Kamal Khera

Leader of the Government in the House of Commons
- In office October 26, 2021 – July 26, 2023
- Prime Minister: Justin Trudeau
- Preceded by: Pablo Rodríguez
- Succeeded by: Karina Gould

Chief Government Whip
- In office August 31, 2018 – October 26, 2021
- Prime Minister: Justin Trudeau
- Preceded by: Pablo Rodríguez
- Succeeded by: Steven MacKinnon

Parliamentary Secretary to the Minister of Public Safety and Emergency Preparedness
- In office January 30, 2017 – August 31, 2018
- Minister: Ralph Goodale
- Preceded by: Michel Picard
- Succeeded by: Karen McCrimmon

Parliamentary Secretary to the Minister of Democratic Institutions
- In office October 19, 2015 – January 30, 2017
- Minister: Maryam Monsef
- Preceded by: Tom Lukiwski
- Succeeded by: Andy Fillmore

Member of Parliament for Ajax
- In office October 19, 2015 – April 28, 2025
- Preceded by: Constituency established
- Succeeded by: Jennifer McKelvie

Member of Parliament for Ajax—Pickering
- In office June 28, 2004 – May 2, 2011
- Preceded by: Constituency established
- Succeeded by: Chris Alexander

Personal details
- Born: October 16, 1974 (age 52) Pickering, Ontario, Canada
- Party: Liberal
- Spouse: Cindy Fournier (m. 2009)
- Education: University of Toronto (BA)
- Profession: Health Executive, investment advisor, politician

Mark Holland PC (born October 16, 1974) is a Canadian politician who was the member of Parliament (MP) for Ajax from 2015 to 2025 and Ajax—Pickering from 2004 to 2011. A member of the Liberal Party, Holland served as the chief government whip from 2018 to 2021, government house leader from 2021 to 2023, and minister of health from 2023 to 2025. He was a municipal councillor for the City of Pickering from 1997 to 2004 and the Region of Durham from 2000 to 2004. After leaving politics, Holland became the chief executive officer (CEO) of the Canadian National Exhibition (CNE) in July 2025.

== Background ==
Holland was born on October 16, 1974, in Pickering, Ontario. Holland majored in political science and history at the University of Toronto and graduated in 1996. He worked as an assistant to Member of Parliament Dan McTeague and at the Ontario Ministry of Citizenship and Immigration. He also worked for the Royal Bank of Canada and the Canadian Imperial Bank of Commerce.

A lifelong resident of west Durham, Holland lives in Ajax.

== Career ==
=== Municipal politics ===
Holland served as a city councillor for the city of Pickering from 1997 to 2004, and as a councillor for the Regional Municipality of Durham from 2000 to 2004.

Holland created the Millennium Waterfront Committee in Pickering in 1998 and led the redevelopment of Pickering's waterfront. He also founded the Region of Durham's Youth Partnership Initiative, the City of Pickering's Winterfest and was a member of the board of directors for Veridian Corporation. Holland was also a member of the Durham Region Police Services Board, past vice-chair of both the Ajax-Pickering Social Development Council and the Ajax-Pickering Block Parent program and a past member of Durham Region's finance and administration committee. He continues to be a member of the Durham West Arts Centre and was one of their founding members.

=== Federal politics ===
Holland is a member of the Liberal Party of Canada in the House of Commons of Canada, representing the riding of Ajax-Pickering from 2004 to 2011, and representing Ajax since 2015. He has served as vice-chair of the Public Accounts Committee, vice-chair of the Public Safety and National Security Committee, critic for Natural Resources, critic for Public Works and Procurement, critic for the Canada Border Services Agency, associate critic for Treasury Board, as a member of the Finance Committee, Industry Committee, Public Accounts Committee, Government Operations Committee and on the Cities and Communities Caucus.

In Parliament, Holland brought up a private member's bill to advocate for the cause of lowering the voting age. The bill stipulated that 16- to 18-year-olds be allowed to vote in federal elections encouraged provincial and municipal jurisdictions to allow the same. He asked that an elections unit be taught in high schools before elections take place, to inform students on current events and issues at debate. By raising this interest in youth first, at the election they will make more informed choices. Furthermore, voting would take place in schools, raising voter turnout. In October 2006, Holland re-introduced as a private members bill a former Liberal government bill to reform the animal cruelty sections of the Criminal Code of Canada, which have changed little since 1892.

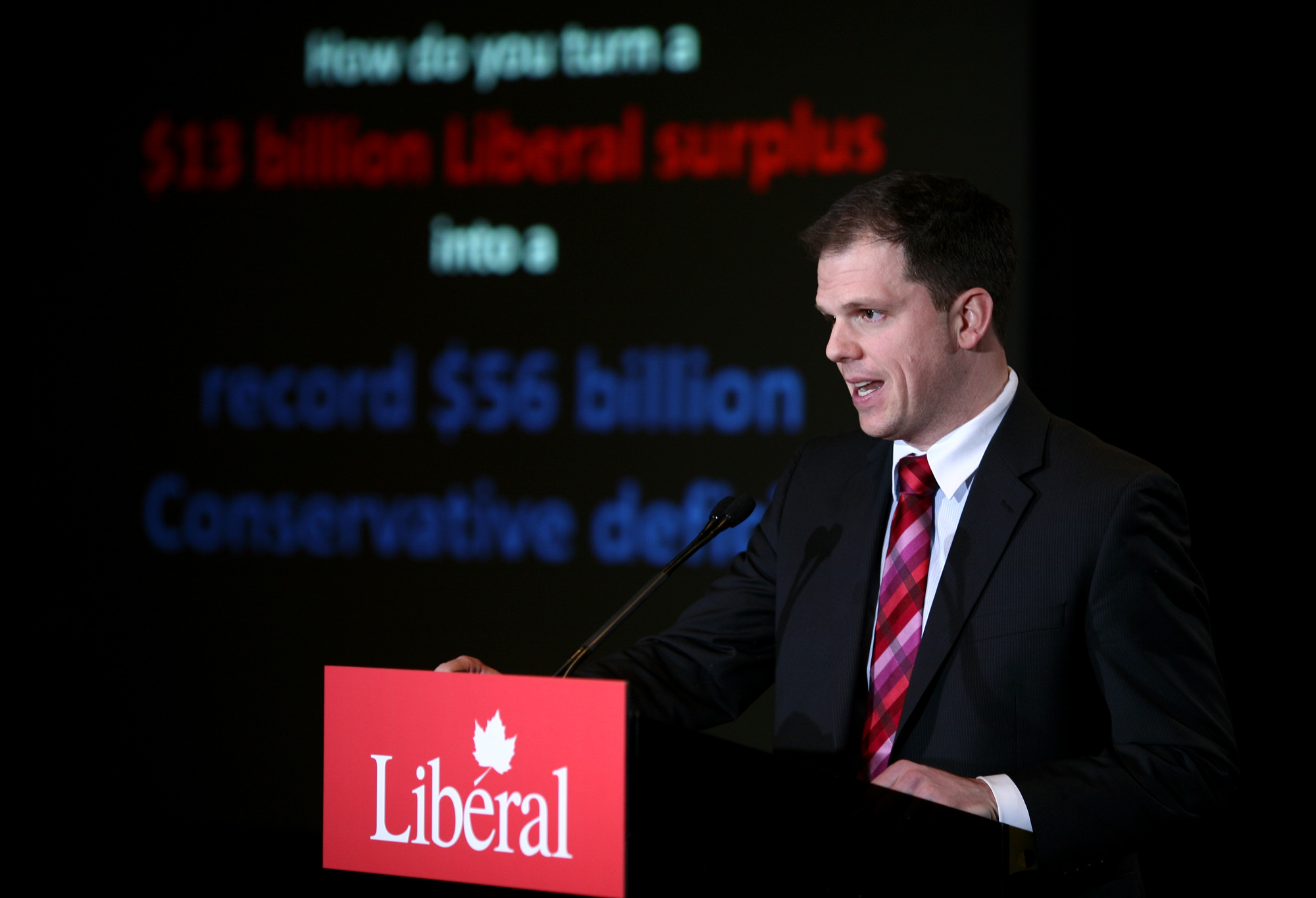
Holland speaking at a Toronto news conference.

Holland has been named by The Globe and Mail as a member of the new 'Rat Pack' and was voted by the Hill Times as the most effective Opposition MP in Question Period and the 'Best Up-And-Comer' four times from 2006–2008. Conservative Minister Stockwell Day has referred to Holland as 'Perry Mason on Steroids' and 'the Caped Crusader' during their sometimes heated exchanges in the Public Safety and National Security meetings. CTV called Holland "a one-man rat pack on a mission to change the hill". Macleans has labelled Holland – 'Part Attack Dog – Part King Maker' for his going after Conservatives and for his role in the 2006 leadership campaign.

Aaron Wherry of Maclean's Magazine spoke of Holland saying "If you saw Kennedy in Montreal, Holland was inevitably not far behind. Already a favourite of some on Parliament Hill for his oratory skills and his impressive head of hair, Holland is a mere 32 years old – making him a potential leadership candidate for the next 30 years."

Holland supported Gerard Kennedy's leadership bid for the federal Liberal Party and was Kennedy's Ontario campaign chair. When Kennedy dropped off after the second ballot to support former Environment Minister Stéphane Dion, Holland went with him and was seen as key in building a bridge between the two camps. Holland was the Ontario co-chair of Michael Ignatieff's 2008 leadership campaign.

On January 18, 2007, Holland was named the critic for Natural Resources in Dion's shadow cabinet. He was subsequently named critic for Public Safety and National Security, a post he held until his defeat in 2011. In that capacity, he led the opposition criticism over handling of the G8 Summit, efforts to save the gun registry and opposition to the Conservative Party's crime agenda. As a sharp and vocal critic of the government, the Conservatives dubbed him "Public Enemy Number 1" prior to the 2011 election, a fact Holland wore as "a badge of honour" citing other prominent Canadians the government targeted for disagreeing with their agenda. Holland was unseated by Chris Alexander, a former diplomat who ran as a Conservative. Holland has recently admitted that he attempted suicide after that defeat, saying "I was told that I was toxic. The Conservatives hated me. No organization would hire me. My marriage failed. My space with my children was not in a good place and most particularly my passion — the thing I believed so ardently in ... the purpose of my life — was in ashes at my feet."

He became the director of health promotion and public affairs with the Heart and Stroke Foundation of Canada following his 2011 defeat. He also served as the Heart and Stroke Foundation's executive director for the Ontario Mission and national director of children and youth, before returning to federal politics in 2015.

In 2015, Holland was nominated the Liberal candidate for the new riding of Ajax, essentially the southern portion of his old riding, thus positioning him for a rematch against sitting MP Chris Alexander. As part of the Liberal surge in southern Ontario, he won back his seat with 56 percent of the vote, defeating Alexander by almost 12,000 votes.

In December 2015, Holland was announced as the parliamentary secretary to the Minister for Democratic Institutions. In January 2017, he was shifted to Public Safety and Emergency Preparedness. In August 2018, he was promoted to the position of Chief Government Whip, succeeding the previous whip, Member of Parliament for Honoré-Mercier Pablo Rodriguez. He served until October 2021, when he became Government House Leader, which he held until his July 2023 appointment as Minister of Health. In March 2025, Holland decided not to seek reelection in the 2025 Canadian federal election.

=== Post-politics ===
Holland was named CEO of the Canadian National Exhibition on July 29, 2025.

== Electoral record ==
2021 Canadian federal election: Ajax
Party	Candidate	Votes	%	±%	Expenditures
Liberal	Mark Holland	28,279	56.83	–0.85	$61,841.13
Conservative	Arshad Awan	13,237	26.60	+0.60	$37,722.66
New Democratic	Monique Hughes	6,988	14.04	+2.51	$3,075.61
Green	Leigh Paulseth	1,254	2.52	–0.82	$11,493.41
Total valid votes/expense limit		49,758	98.96	–	$120,937.77
Total rejected ballots		525	1.04	+0.25	
Turnout		50,283	54.10	–11.88	
Eligible voters		92,945			
Liberal hold		Swing		–0.73	
Source: Elections Canada

2019 Canadian federal election: Ajax
Party	Candidate	Votes	%	±%	Expenditures
Liberal	Mark Holland	35,198	57.68	+1.81	$64,483.26
Conservative	Tom Dingwall	15,864	26.00	-8.41	$102,214.59
New Democratic	Shokat Malik	7,033	11.53	+3.30	$9,641.03
Green	Maia Knight	2,040	3.34	+1.94	$1,882.83
People's	Susanna Russo	588	0.96		$3,679.53
Independent	Allen Keith Hadley	186	0.30		$1,441.93
Independent	Intab Ali	111	0.18		none listed
Total valid votes/expense limit		61,020	99.21		
Total rejected ballots		487	0.79	+0.43	
Turnout		61,507	65.98	-0.31	
Eligible voters		93,215			
Liberal hold		Swing		+5.11	
Source: Elections Canada

2015 Canadian federal election: Ajax
Party	Candidate	Votes	%	±%	Expenditures
Liberal	Mark Holland	31,458	55.87	+17.94	$98,658.57
Conservative	Chris Alexander	19,374	34.41	−9.82	$154,560.57
New Democratic	Stephanie Brown	4,630	8.22	−6.78	$3,065.75
Green	Jeff Hill	788	1.40	−1.32	$717.00
United	Bob Kesic	57	0.10	-0.02	–
Total valid votes/expense limit		56,307	99.64		$222,192.40
Total rejected ballots		206	0.36	–	
Turnout		56,513	66.29	–	
Eligible voters		85,251			
Liberal gain from Conservative		Swing		+13.88	
Source: Elections Canada

2011 Canadian federal election: Ajax—Pickering
Party	Candidate	Votes	%	±%	Expenditures
Conservative	Chris Alexander	24,797	44.07	+6.12	
Liberal	Mark Holland	21,569	38.33	-6.20	
New Democratic	Jim Koppens	8,284	14.72	+5.64	
Green	Mihkel Harilaid	1,621	2.88	-4.40	
United	Bob Kesic	72	0.13	–	
Total valid votes/expense limit		56,268	100.00		
Total rejected ballots		187	0.33	-0.05	
Turnout		56,455	61.22		
Conservative gain from Liberal		Swing		+6.16	

2008 Canadian federal election: Ajax—Pickering
Party	Candidate	Votes	%	±%	Expenditures
Liberal	Mark Holland	21,675	44.53	-4.9	$53,225
Conservative	Rick Johnson	18,471	37.95	+5.2	$87,925
New Democratic	Bala Thavarajasoorier	4,422	9.08	-3.6	$1,541
Green	Mike Harilaid	3,543	7.28	+3.1	$3,531
Christian Heritage	Kevin Norng	398	0.82	0.0	$1,171
Libertarian	Stephanie Wilson	167	0.34	N/A	$20
Total valid votes/Expense limit		48,676	100	$89,065	
Total rejected ballots		186	0.38		
Turnout		48,862			
Liberal hold		Swing		-5.05	

2006 Canadian federal election: Ajax—Pickering
Party	Candidate	Votes	%	±%	Expenditures
Liberal	Mark Holland	25,636	49.38	-0.39	$43,781
Conservative	Rondo Thomas	16,992	32.73	-0.90	$77,308
New Democratic	Kevin Modeste	6,655	12.82	+0.70	$8,405
Green	Russell Korus	2,199	4.24	-0.23	$948
Christian Heritage	Kevin Norng	435	0.84	n/a	$7,950
Total valid votes/Expense limit		51,917	100.00	$77,681	
Liberal hold		Swing		+0.51	

2004 Canadian federal election: Ajax—Pickering
Party	Candidate	Votes	%	±%
Liberal	Mark Holland	21,706	49.77	-7.67
Conservative	René Soetens	14,666	33.63	-3.83
New Democratic	Kevin Modeste	5,286	12.12	+8.10
Green	Karen MacDonald	1,951	4.47	–
Total valid votes		43,609		
Liberal notional hold		Swing		-3.84
