= Frederick Luther Fowke =

Canadian politician (1857–1939)

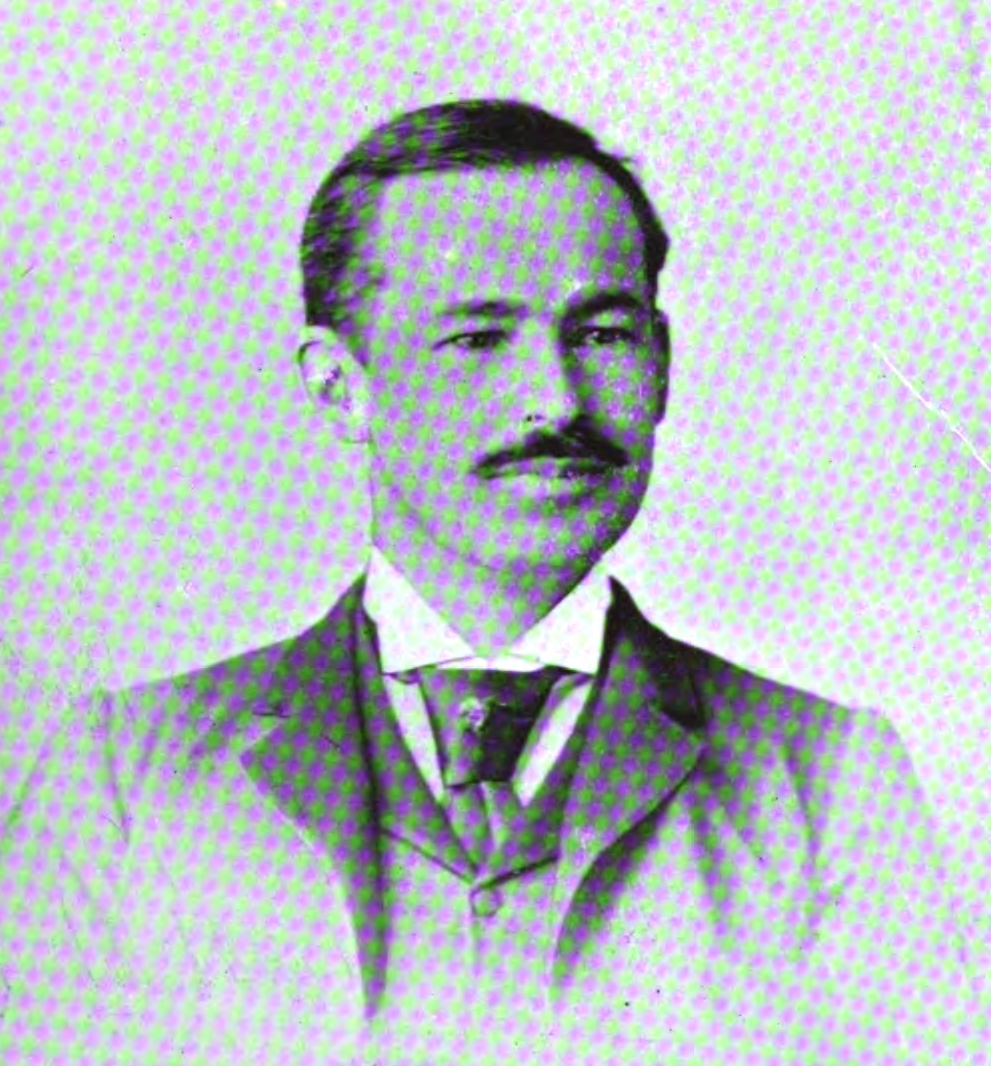
- Fowke in 1893

Member of Parliament for Ontario South
- In office 1908–1911
- Preceded by: Peter Christie
- Succeeded by: William Smith

Mayor of Oshawa
- In office 1900–1906
- Preceded by: Robert McLaughlin
- Succeeded by: Thomas Erlin Kaiser
- In office 1898–1898
- Preceded by: W. J. Hare
- Succeeded by: Robert McLaughlin

Personal details
- Born: May 27, 1857 Harmony settlement, East Whitby Canada West
- Died: August 25, 1939 (aged 82) Chester, Nova Scotia, Canada

Frederick Luther Fowke (27 May 1857 – 25 August 1939) was a merchant and political figure in Ontario, Canada. He represented Ontario South in the House of Commons of Canada from 1908 to 1911 as a Liberal.

== Biography ==
=== Early life and family ===
Frederick Luther Fowke was born on 27 May 1857 at Harmony settlement, East Whitby, Canada West, the son of Job Wilson Fowke and Adeline Perkins Stone, the daughter of The Hon. Marshall B. Stone, a member of the Legislature of the State of Minnesota at the time. Job was a leading merchant of Oshawa for over thirty years. Frederick received his primary education in a public school in Oshawa and attended the British American Commercial College in Toronto for one year.

On June 28, 1911, Fowke married Flora Wheeler St. Germaine.

=== Career in business ===
After his father's death, Fowke took over his business in 1878 and expanded his business. He operated his father's general store and sold grain and coal there. Two years later, he bought a dry goods company in Oshawa, which he conducted as successful as his trade. His enterprise expanded from Oshawa to Bowmanville, Whitby, Newcastle, and Port Hope. In addition to this, he had also retailed coal and exported apples to Europe.

=== Career in politics ===
Fowke first served as a member of the Ontario County council in 1888 for two years. He then served as a member of the Oshawa town council for fifteen years. He then served as mayor of Oshawa from 1898 for one year, after being interrupted by Robert McLaughlin in 1899. He became mayor again in 1900 and continued until 1906.

Fowke was then first elected in the House of Commons of Canada, representing Ontario South in 1908 as a Liberal, defeating Peter Christie. However, he was defeated when he ran for reelection to the House of Commons in 1911 to William Smith after supporting Wilfrid Laurier's policy of reciprocity with the United States.

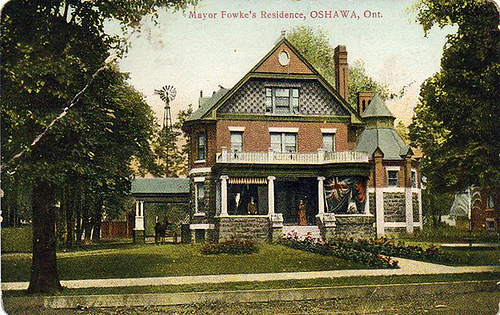
Mayoral Residence of Frederick Luther Fowke, Gladstone Villa

During the formation and election of the Union Government in 1917, he was one of the people who were against Laurier's stance on the conscription of men during the First World War.

=== Halifax Explosion ===
He was appointed by Prime Minister Robert Borden as one of the three Commissioners in the Halifax Relief Commission following the Halifax Explosion, alongside Tecumseh Sherman Rogers and William Bernard Wallace. Fowke was picked because Borden wanted somebody experienced in civic duties to run the commission. They were tasked to restore a part of the city of Halifax that was destroyed by the boat collision.

=== Later life and death ===
By 1920, Fowke formally resigned from the HRC and his business, spending nearly $27 million on urban planning for the city. Him and his family moved to Fredas Point in Chester in Nova Scotia, where he purchased a house there. Fowke then died on 25 August 1939. He is buried in Oshawa's Union Cemetery.

== Election results ==
1908 Canadian federal election: South riding of Ontario
Party	Candidate	Votes
Liberal	Fred Luther Fowke	2,939
Conservative	Peter Christie	2,696

1911 Canadian federal election: South riding of Ontario
Party	Candidate	Votes
Conservative	William Smith	2,917
Liberal	Frederick Luther Fowke	2,547
