= Lawson Omar Clifford =

Canadian politician

Member of Parliament for Ontario South
- In office December 1921 – October 1925
- Preceded by: William Smith
- Succeeded by: riding dissolved

Personal details
- Born: Lawson Omar Clifford; 22 June 1878 Oshawa, Ontario
- Died: 7 December 1937 (aged 59)
- Party: Liberal
- Profession: farmer, fruit grower, rancher

Lawson Omar Clifford (22 June 1878 – 7 December 1937) was a Liberal party member of the House of Commons of Canada. He was born in Oshawa, Ontario and became a farmer, fruit grower and rancher.

He was elected to Parliament at the Ontario South riding in the 1921 general election. During his only federal term, the 14th Canadian Parliament, riding boundaries were changed so that Clifford became a candidate in the new Ontario riding. In the 1925 federal election, Clifford was defeated by Thomas Erlin Kaiser of the Conservatives.
