= Ontario South =

Former federal electoral district in Ontario, Canada

Ontario electoral district

Defunct federal electoral district
- Legislature: House of Commons
- District created: 1867
- District abolished: 1924
- First contested: 1867
- Last contested: 1921

Ontario South was a federal electoral district represented in the House of Commons of Canada from 1867 to 1925. It was located in the province of Ontario. It was created by the British North America Act 1867.

The South riding consisted initially of the Townships of Whitby and East Whitby, Pickering, the Town of Whitby and the Village of Oshawa.

In 1882, the Township of Reach and the village of Port Perry were added to the riding.

The electoral district was abolished in 1924 when it was merged into Ontario riding.

== Members of Parliament ==
This riding has elected the following members of Parliament:

Parliament	Years	Member	Party
1st	1867–1872	Thomas Nicholson Gibbs	Liberal–Conservative
2nd	1872–1873	Thomas Nicholson Gibbs	Liberal–Conservative
2nd	1873–1874	Thomas Nicholson Gibbs	Liberal–Conservative
3rd	1874–1876	Malcolm Cameron	Liberal
3rd	1876–1878	Thomas Nicholson Gibbs	Liberal–Conservative
4th	1878–1882	Francis Wayland Glen	Liberal
5th	1882–1887	Francis Wayland Glen	Liberal
6th	1887–1891	William Smith	Conservative
7th	1891–1892	James Ironside Davidson	Liberal
7th	1892–1896	William Smith	Conservative
8th	1896–1900	Leonard Burnett	Liberal
9th	1900–1904	William Ross	Liberal
10th	1904–1908	Peter Christie	Conservative
11th	1908–1911	Frederick Luther Fowke	Liberal
12th	1911–1917	William Smith	Conservative
13th	1917–1921	William Smith	Government (Unionist)
14th	1921–1925	Lawson Omar Clifford	Liberal
Riding dissolved into Ontario

== Election history ==
1867 Canadian federal election: South riding of Ontario
Party	Candidate	Votes
Liberal-Conservative	Thomas Nicholson Gibbs	1,292
Liberal	George Brown	1,223
Source: Canadian Elections Database

1872 Canadian federal election: South riding of Ontario
Party	Candidate	Votes
Liberal-Conservative	Thomas Nicholson Gibbs	1,466
Unknown	P. White Trueman	1,373
Unknown	Mr. White	

Note: Newspaper for the time recorded the name of Gibbs' opponent as Truman P. White.

By-election: On Mr. Gibbs being appointed Secretary of State for the Provinces and Superintendent General of Indian Affairs, 7 July 1873: South riding of Ontario
Party	Candidate	Votes
Liberal-Conservative	Thomas Nicholson Gibbs	acclaimed

1874 Canadian federal election: South riding of Ontario
Party	Candidate	Votes
Liberal	Malcolm Cameron	1,639
Liberal-Conservative	Thomas Nicholson Gibbs	1,488

By-election: On Mr. Cameron's death, 5 July 1876: South riding of Ontario
Party	Candidate	Votes
Liberal-Conservative	Thomas Nicholson Gibbs	1,665
Unknown	James D. Edgar	1,627

1878 Canadian federal election: South riding of Ontario
Party	Candidate	Votes
Liberal	Francis Wayland Glen	1,867
Liberal-Conservative	Thomas Nicholson Gibbs	1,661
Source: Canadian Elections Database

1882 Canadian federal election: South riding of Ontario
Party	Candidate	Votes
Liberal	Francis Wayland Glen	1,668
Conservative	William Smith	1,618

1887 Canadian federal election: South riding of Ontario
Party	Candidate	Votes
Conservative	William Smith	2,118
Liberal	Francis Rae	1,931

1891 Canadian federal election: South riding of Ontario
Party	Candidate	Votes
Liberal	James Ironside Davidson	2,042
Conservative	William Smith	2,009

By-election: On election being declared void, 20 February 1892: South riding of Ontario
Party	Candidate	Votes
Conservative	William Smith	acclaimed

1896 Canadian federal election: South riding of Ontario
Party	Candidate	Votes
Liberal	Leonard Burnett	2,165
Conservative	William Smith	2,021

1900 Canadian federal election: South riding of Ontario
Party	Candidate	Votes
Liberal	William Ross	1,970
Conservative	William Smith	1,876

1904 Canadian federal election: South riding of Ontario
Party	Candidate	Votes
Conservative	Peter Christie	2,544
Liberal	William Ross	2,439

1908 Canadian federal election: South riding of Ontario
Party	Candidate	Votes
Liberal	Fred Luther Fowke	2,939
Conservative	Peter Christie	2,696

1911 Canadian federal election: South riding of Ontario
Party	Candidate	Votes
Conservative	William Smith	2,917
Liberal	Frederick Luther Fowke	2,547

1917 Canadian federal election: South riding of Ontario
Party	Candidate	Votes
Government	William Smith	5,205
Opposition	W. E. N. Sinclair	2,682

1921 Canadian federal election: South riding of Ontario
Party	Candidate	Votes
Liberal	Lawson Omar Clifford	5,102
Conservative	William Smith	4,923
Progressive	Frank Mackenzie Chapman	3,102

== See also ==
- List of Canadian electoral districts
- Historical federal electoral districts of Canada
