= Thomas Nicholson Gibbs =

Canadian politician

The Honourable Thomas Nicholson Gibbs PC
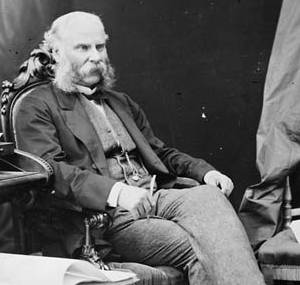

Member of Parliament for Ontario South
- In office 1867–1874
- Succeeded by: Malcolm Cameron
- In office 1876–1878
- Preceded by: Malcolm Cameron
- Succeeded by: Francis Wayland Glen

Canadian Senator from Ontario
- In office 1880–1883
- Appointed by: John A. Macdonald

Personal details
- Born: March 11, 1821 Terrebonne, Lower Canada
- Died: April 7, 1883 (aged 62) Oshawa, Ontario, Canada
- Party: Liberal-Conservative
- Relatives: William Henry Gibbs (brother)
- Cabinet: Superintendent-General of Indian Affairs (1873); Secretary of State for the Provinces (1873); Minister of Inland Revenue (1873)

Thomas Nicholson Gibbs PC (March 11, 1821 – April 7, 1883) was a Canadian parliamentarian and Senator. He was Oshawa's chief businessman and financier, and dominated local politics in the 1850s and '60s.

== Background ==
Thomas Nicholson Gibbs was born in Terrebonne, Lower Canada (now Quebec), the eldest son of Thomas Gibbs and Caroline Tate. They had emigrated from England to British North America in 1819. Due to letters of introduction, Thomas Gibbs was soon employed as the master miller of the Seigneur of Terrebonne. Gibbs' family moved to Oshawa, Upper Canada (now Ontario) in 1832.

In Oshawa, Thomas Gibbs started one of the first mills in Canada, and his brands of flour, Gibbs Best and Plough, was well known in the New York and Boston markets till 1850s. At 14 years of age, in 1935, T.N. Gibbs joined his father in running a milling business. Gibbs was "intensely disliked" by his employees due to his harsh labour practices and corrupt business practices.

Gibbs later served as Oshawa’s first reeve, an elected local official. Gibbs later became a confidant and fixer for John A. MacDonald after Confederation.

In 1867, when the first national election was held, he was elected to the House of Commons of Canada for the Ontario South. He ran as a Liberal-Conservative and defeated George Brown, a Father of Confederation. The election was very costly and there were strong allegations that the voters were bribed or the vote had been fixed, but it could not be proven. He was re-elected in 1872.

He was defeated in 1874 but was re-elected in an 1876 by-election. However, he was defeated again in 1878. In 1873, he was the Secretary of State for the Provinces, Superintendent-General of Indian Affairs, and the Minister of Inland Revenue.

MacDonald's defeat in 1874 ended his Cabinet career. In 1880, he was appointed to the Senate representing the senatorial division of Newmarket, Ontario. He died in office in 1883.

== Electoral record ==
1867 Canadian federal election: South riding of Ontario
Party	Candidate	Votes
Liberal-Conservative	Thomas Nicholson Gibbs	1,292
Liberal	George Brown	1,223
Source: Canadian Elections Database

1872 Canadian federal election: South riding of Ontario
Party	Candidate	Votes
Liberal-Conservative	Thomas Nicholson Gibbs	1,466
Unknown	P. White Trueman	1,373
Unknown	Mr. White	

Note: Newspaper for the time recorded the name of Gibbs' opponent as Truman P. White.

By-election: On Mr. Gibbs being appointed Secretary of State for the Provinces and Superintendent General of Indian Affairs, 7 July 1873: South riding of Ontario
Party	Candidate	Votes
Liberal-Conservative	Thomas Nicholson Gibbs	acclaimed

1874 Canadian federal election: South riding of Ontario
Party	Candidate	Votes
Liberal	Malcolm Cameron	1,639
Liberal-Conservative	Thomas Nicholson Gibbs	1,488

By-election: On Mr. Cameron's death, 5 July 1876: South riding of Ontario
Party	Candidate	Votes
Liberal-Conservative	Thomas Nicholson Gibbs	1,665
Unknown	James D. Edgar	1,627

1878 Canadian federal election: South riding of Ontario
Party	Candidate	Votes
Liberal	Francis Wayland Glen	1,867
Liberal-Conservative	Thomas Nicholson Gibbs	1,661
Source: Canadian Elections Database
