= Pickering—Scarborough East (federal electoral district) =

Former federal electoral district in Ontario, Canada

Coordinates: 43.811°N 79.138°W

Ontario electoral district
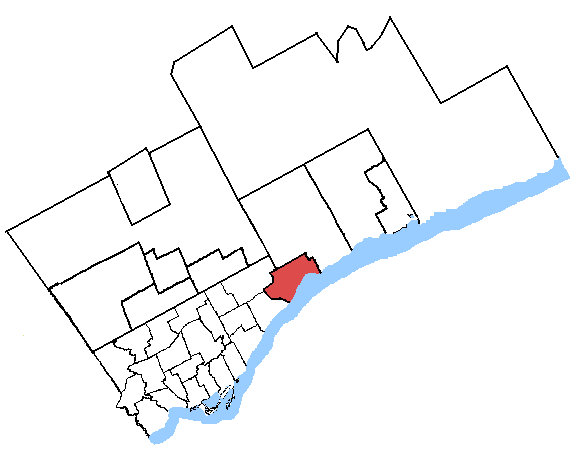
- Pickering—Scarborough East in relation to other Greater Toronto ridings

Defunct federal electoral district
- Legislature: House of Commons
- District created: 2003
- District abolished: 2013
- First contested: 2004
- Last contested: 2011
- District webpage: profile, map

Demographics
- Population (2011): 107,910
- Electors (2011): 76,709
- Area (km²): 49.42
- Census division(s): Durham, Toronto
- Census subdivision(s): Pickering, Scarborough

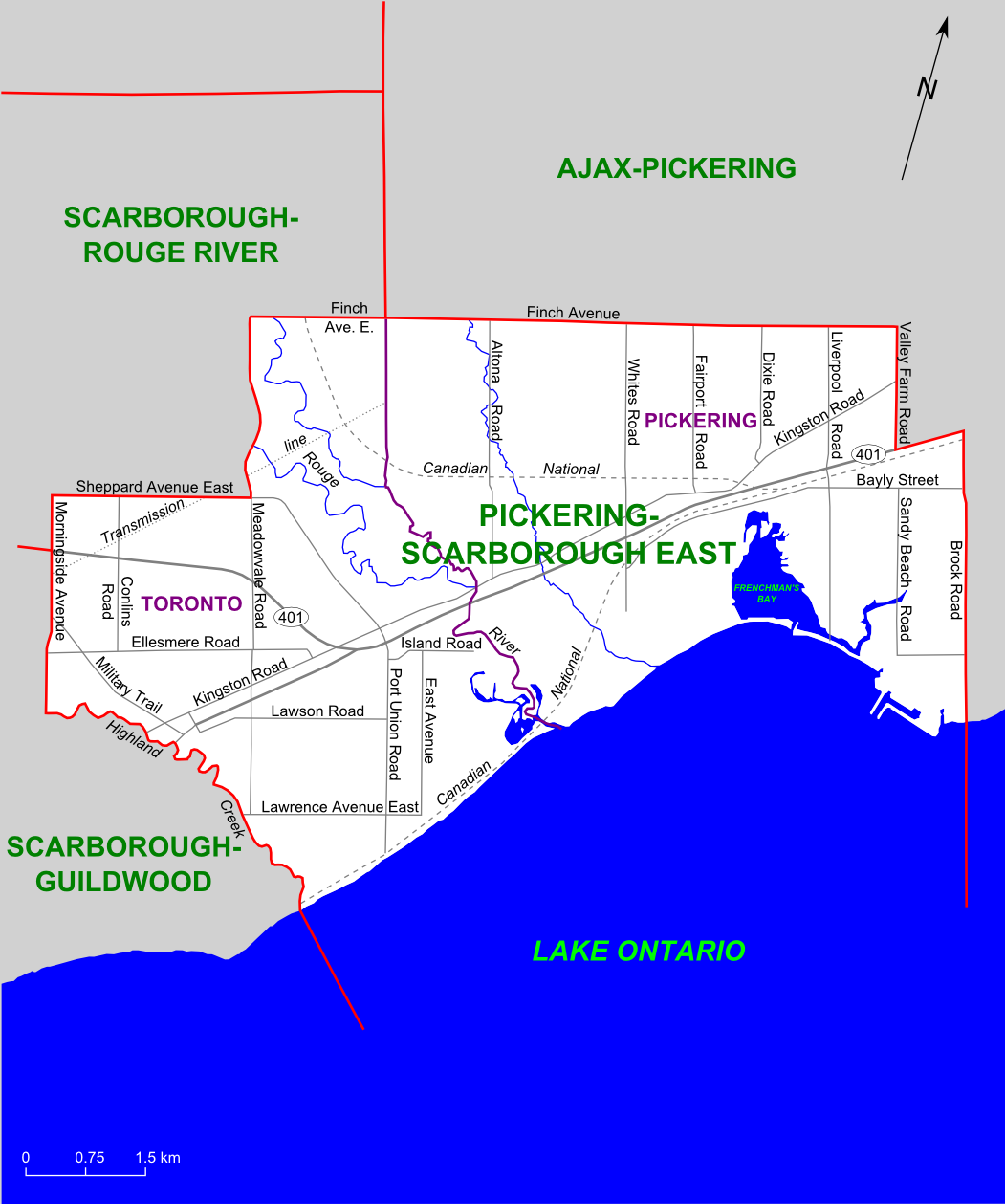
Map of Pickering-Scarborough East

Pickering—Scarborough East was a federal electoral district in Ontario, Canada, that had been represented in the House of Commons of Canada from 2004 to 2015.

The district was created in 2003 from 44.1% of Pickering—Ajax—Uxbridge, 39.7% of Scarborough East, and 0.1% of Scarborough—Rouge River ridings.

Following the Canadian federal electoral redistribution, 2012, the riding was redistributed between Pickering—Uxbridge and Scarborough—Rouge Park.

The district consisted of the southwest part of the city of Pickering and the southeast part of the Scarborough district of Toronto. It was the only riding to overlap the boundaries of the 416 (City of Toronto) and the 905 (Greater Toronto Area) regions.

Specifically, it consisted of the part of the City of Pickering lying south and west of a line drawn from the western city limit east along Finch Avenue, south along Valley Farm Road, northeast along Highway 401 and south along Brock Road to the southern city limit; and the part of the City of Toronto lying south and east of a line drawn from the eastern city limit west along Finch Avenue East, south along Meadowvale Road, west along Sheppard Avenue East, south along Morningside Avenue and southeast along Highland Creek to Lake Ontario.

== Demographics ==
(According to the 2006 Canadian census)

Ethnic groups: 61.3% White, 13.5% South Asian, 10.4% Black, 4.1% Filipino, 3.2% Chinese
Languages: 74.6% English, 1.3% French, 23.9% Other
Average income: $31 920

== Member of Parliament ==
This riding has elected the following members of Parliament:

Parliament	Years	Member	Party
Pickering—Scarborough East; Riding created from Pickering—Ajax—Uxbridge, Scarborough East and Scarborough—Rouge River
38th	2004–2006	Dan McTeague	Liberal
39th	2006–2008	Dan McTeague	Liberal
40th	2008–2011	Dan McTeague	Liberal
41st	2011–2015	Corneliu Chisu	Conservative
Riding dissolved into Pickering—Uxbridge and Scarborough—Rouge Park

== Election results ==
Graph of election results in Pickering—Scarborough East (minor parties that never got 2% of the vote or didn't run consistently are omitted)

2011 Canadian federal election
Party	Candidate	Votes	%	±%	Expenditures
Conservative	Corneliu Chisu	19,220	40.11	+7.66	
Liberal	Dan McTeague	18,013	37.59	-12.10	
New Democratic	Andrea Moffat	8,932	18.64	+8.05	
Green	Kevin Smith	1,751	3.65	-2.91	
Total valid votes/Expense limit		47,916	100.00		
Total rejected ballots		156	0.32	-0.02	
Turnout		48,072	62.01	+1.79	
Eligible voters		77,522	–	–	

2008 Canadian federal election
Party	Candidate	Votes	%	±%	Expenditures
Liberal	Dan McTeague	22,874	49.69	-3.0	$70,257
Conservative	George Khouri	14,940	32.45	+0.8	$52,293
New Democratic	Andrea Moffat	4,875	10.59	-1.1	$10,260
Green	Jason Becevello	3,023	6.56	+2.9	$1,224
Christian Heritage	Rick Chue	191	0.41	N/A	$1,408
Canadian Action	Chai Kalevar	130	0.28	N/A	
Total valid votes/Expense limit		46,033	100.00	$83,646	
Total rejected ballots		161	0.35	–	
Turnout		46,194	60.22		

2006 Canadian federal election
Party	Candidate	Votes	%	±%
Liberal	Dan McTeague	27,720	52.9	-4.1
Conservative	Tim Dobson	16,686	31.9	+3.9
New Democratic	Gary Dale	6,083	11.6	+0.4
Green	Jeff Brownridge	1,863	3.6	-0.2
Total valid votes		52,352	100.0	

2004 Canadian federal election
Party	Candidate	Votes	%
Liberal	Dan McTeague	27,312	57.0
Conservative	Tim Dobson	13,417	28.0
New Democratic	Gary Dale	5,392	11.2
Green	Matthew Pollesel	1,809	3.8
Total valid votes		47,930	100.0

== See also ==
- List of Canadian electoral districts
- Historical federal electoral districts of Canada
