= Pickering—Ajax—Uxbridge =

Former federal electoral district in Ontario, Canada

Ontario electoral district

Defunct federal electoral district
- Legislature: House of Commons
- District created: 1996
- District abolished: 2003
- First contested: 1997
- Last contested: 2000

Demographics
- Population (2001): 137,518
- Electors (2002): 85,627
- Area (km²): 731
- Census subdivision(s): Pickering, Ajax, Uxbridge

Pickering—Ajax—Uxbridge was an electoral district in Ontario, Canada, that was represented in the House of Commons of Canada from 1997 to 2003. This riding was created in 1996, from parts of Durham and Ontario ridings.

It consisted of the Township of Uxbridge, the Town of Pickering, and the part of the Town of Ajax lying north of Kingston Road.

The electoral district was abolished in 2003 when it was redistributed between Ajax—Pickering, Clarington—Scugog—Uxbridge and Pickering—Scarborough East ridings.

== Members of Parliament ==
This riding has elected the following members of Parliament:

Parliament	Years	Member	Party
Riding created from Durham and Ontario
36th	1997–2000	Dan McTeague	Liberal
37th	2000–2004	Dan McTeague	Liberal
Riding dissolved into Ajax—Pickering, Pickering—Scarborough East and Clarington—Scugog—Uxbridge

== Election results ==
1997 Canadian federal election: Pickering—Ajax—Uxbridge
Party	Candidate	Votes
Liberal	Dan McTeague	26,003
Progressive Conservative	Leanne Lewis	10,802
Reform	Ken Griffith	10,537
New Democratic	Douglas W. Grey	2,576

2000 Canadian federal election: Pickering—Ajax—Uxbridge
Party	Candidate	Votes
Liberal	Dan McTeague	28,834
Alliance	Ken Griffith	11,941
Progressive Conservative	Michael Hills	6,884
New Democratic	Ralph Chatoor	1,523
Green	Chris Pennington	1,014

== See also ==
- List of Canadian electoral districts
- Historical federal electoral districts of Canada
