= Peter Christie =

Canadian politician

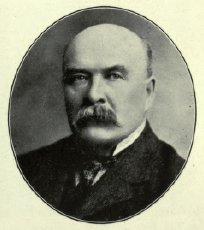

Member of the Canadian Parliament for Ontario South
- In office 1904–1908
- Preceded by: William Ross
- Succeeded by: Frederick Luther Fowke

Personal details
- Born: October 30, 1846 Reach Township, Canada West
- Died: December 13, 1933 (aged 87)
- Party: Conservative

Peter Christie (October 30, 1846 – December 13, 1933) was a Canadian politician.

Born in Reach Township, Ontario County, Canada West, the son of John Christie and Jane McLaren, both Scottish, Christie was a farmer by occupation. He was County Councilor for 30 years and Warden of the County in 1881. He was three years President of the Clydesdale Association of Canada. He was first elected to the House of Commons of Canada for the electoral district of Ontario South in the general elections of 1904. A Conservative, he was defeated in 1908.

1904 Canadian federal election: South riding of Ontario
Party	Candidate	Votes
Conservative	Peter Christie	2,544
Liberal	William Ross	2,439

1908 Canadian federal election: South riding of Ontario
Party	Candidate	Votes
Liberal	Fred Luther Fowke	2,939
Conservative	Peter Christie	2,696
