= James Ironside Davidson =

Scottish-born Canadian politician and farmer

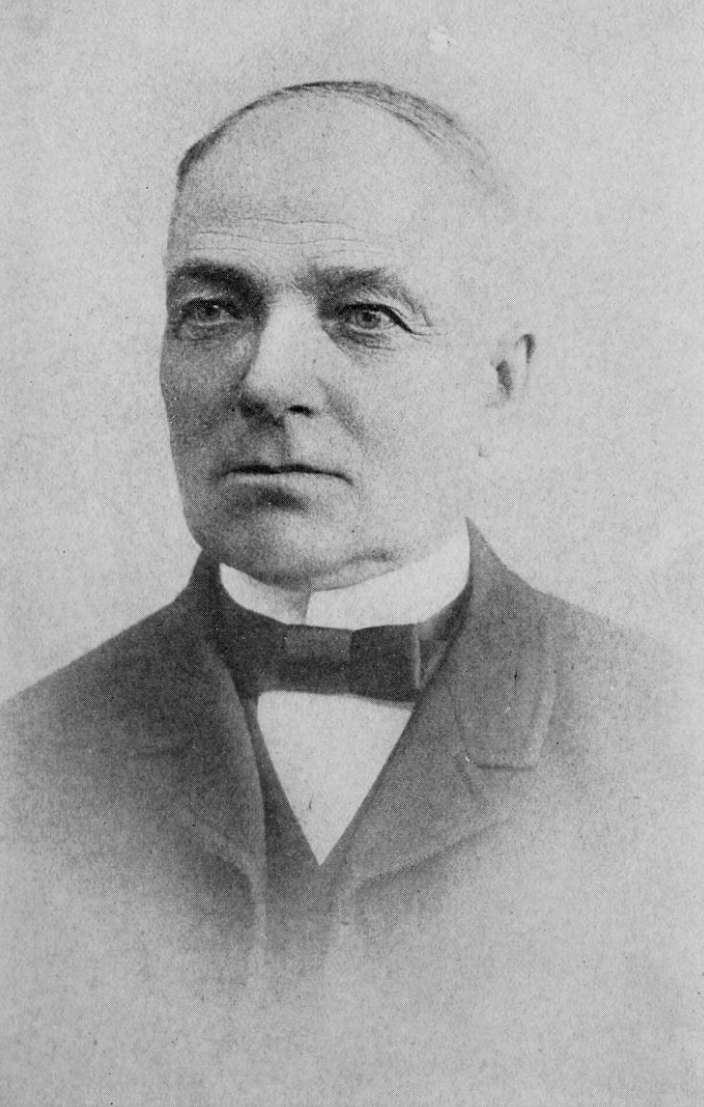
- Born: June 8, 1818; Monquhitter, Aberdeenshire, Scotland
- Died: February 15, 1902 (aged 83); Kawartha Lakes, Ontario, Canada
- Occupations: Farmer, politician
- Spouse: Barbara Hendry (m. 1841)

James Ironside Davidson (June 8, 1818 – February 15, 1902) was a Scottish-born farmer and political figure in Ontario, Canada. He represented Ontario South in the House of Commons of Canada from 1891 to 1892 as a Liberal member.

== Biography ==
He was born in Monquhitter, Aberdeenshire on June 8, 1818. In 1841, he married Barbara Hendry. Davidson was president of the Ontario Central Agricultural Association for two years. He defeated William Smith in the 1891 federal election; however, his election was declared void and Smith won the 1892 by-election by acclamation.

He died at his home near Balsam Lake on February 15, 1902.

1891 Canadian federal election: South riding of Ontario
Party	Candidate	Votes
Liberal	James Ironside Davidson	2,042
Conservative	William Smith	2,009
