= Chris Alexander (politician) =

Canadian diplomat and politician (born 1968)

The Honourable Chris Alexander PC
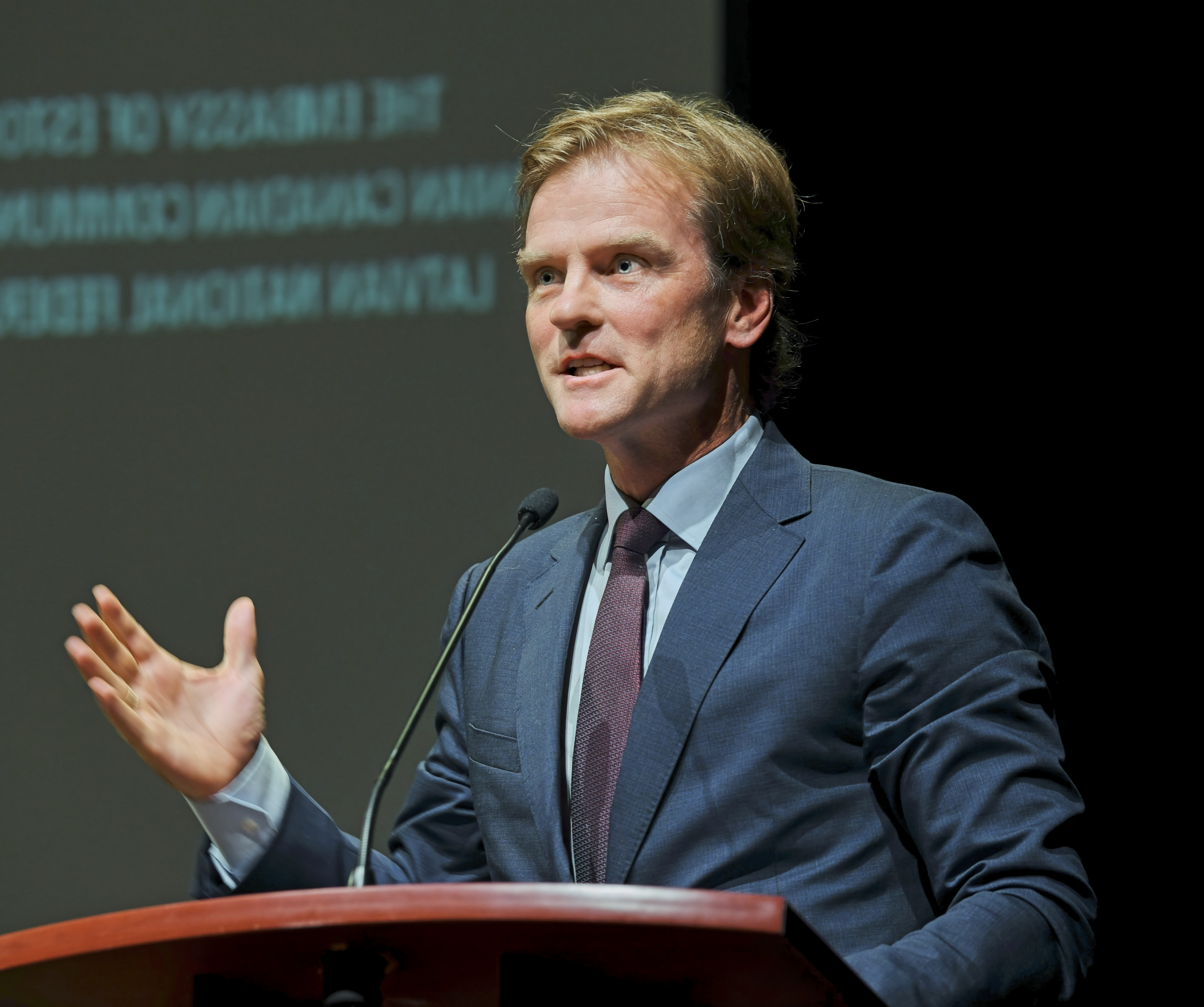
- Alexander in 2019

Minister of Citizenship and Immigration
- In office July 15, 2013 – November 4, 2015
- Prime Minister: Stephen Harper
- Preceded by: Jason Kenney
- Succeeded by: John McCallum

Member of Parliament for Ajax—Pickering
- In office May 2, 2011 – October 19, 2015
- Preceded by: Mark Holland
- Succeeded by: Mark Holland

Ambassador of Canada to Afghanistan
- In office October 1, 2003 – October 5, 2005
- Prime Minister: Jean Chrétien; Paul Martin
- Preceded by: Konrad Sigurdson
- Succeeded by: David Sproule

Personal details
- Born: September 9, 1968 (age 58) Toronto, Ontario, Canada
- Party: Conservative (federal); Independent (municipal)
- Spouse: Hedvig Christine Alexander
- Children: 3
- Education: McGill University (BA); Université Laval; University of Oxford (MA)

Christopher A. Alexander (born September 9, 1968) is a Canadian diplomat and politician who was the minister of citizenship and immigration from 2013 to 2015. A member of the Conservative Party, Alexander was the member of Parliament (MP) for Ajax—Pickering from 2011 to 2015. Before entering politics, Alexander worked in the Canadian Foreign Service and was the Canadian ambassador to Afghanistan from 2003 to 2005.

Alexander spent 18 years in the Canadian Foreign Service and served as Canada's first resident Ambassador to the Islamic Republic of Afghanistan from 2003 to 2005. Following this, he served as a Deputy Special Representative of the United Nations Assistance Mission in Afghanistan until 2009. After winning his seat in the 2011 election, Alexander was appointed to various roles in Prime Minister Stephen Harper's government. He was Parliamentary Secretary to the Minister of National Defence from 2011 to 2013 before becoming Minister of Citizenship and Immigration. Alexander was defeated in re-election to the House of Commons in 2015. He ran for the leadership of the Conservative Party of Canada in 2017, placing 10th in a field of 14 candidates. He was a candidate in the 2026 Toronto mayoral election but withdrew his candidacy prior to the election.

== Background ==
Alexander was born in Toronto, the son of Andrea Alexander, a high school teacher, and Bruce Alexander, a lawyer and assistant deputy minister in the Ontario government. His grandfather, Don Lough, was mayor of Huntsville, Ontario. After graduating from the University of Toronto Schools, Alexander earned a Bachelor of Arts in history and politics from McGill University in 1989 and a Master of Arts in politics, philosophy, and economics from Balliol College, Oxford in 1991. He studied at Université Laval for the first six months of 1989. In 2022, Alexander moved from Ajax back to Toronto. His wife, Hedvig Christine Alexander, is a former Danish Embassy worker. They share three children.

== Diplomatic career ==
In 1991, Alexander joined the Canadian Foreign Service. He was posted to the Canadian embassy in Russia in 1993 as Third Secretary and Vice-Consul. In 1996, he returned to Ottawa to become an assistant to the Deputy Minister of Foreign Affairs. In 1997, he became Deputy Director (Russia) of the Eastern Europe Division responsible for political and trade relations. In 2002, he returned to the Canadian embassy in Moscow as Minister Counsellor (Political).

In 2003, Alexander applied for the position of Canadian ambassador in Kabul, Afghanistan. He was selected for the position and presented his credentials in August 2003, relieving resident chargé d'affaires a.i. Keith Fountain. From 2005 until mid-2009, he served as one of two Deputy Special Representatives of the Secretary-General (SRSG) of the United Nations in the United Nations Assistance Mission in Afghanistan (UNAMA).

Alexander's performance in diplomacy circles was widely lauded. He was described by various commenters as "sensitive to the Afghan culture, knowledgeable, persuasive, totally committed, and hardworking;" "perhaps one of the brightest and most capable diplomats that have come to Afghanistan over the past five years;" and "the best ambassador I've ever worked for." Major General David Fraser, commander of NATO forces in southern Afghanistan, referred to him simply as "an amazing man."

On April 12, 2010, CBC News revealed that Alexander, as a senior official working with the United Nations, alleged that Asadullah Khalid, the former governor of Kandahar Province in Afghanistan, had ordered the killing of five UN workers by bombing, presumably to protect his narcotics interests.

On December 12, 2019, The Globe and Mail published a lengthy opinion piece written by Alexander in which he stated that for most of his time in Afghanistan, he believed that Western strategy "was wrong" in that it did not focus on Pakistan's military support for the Taliban as the root cause of the conflict.

== Private sector career ==
In August 2010, Alexander became president of Red Mountain Energy, a producer of coal-bed methane. Red Mountain founder Denis Smyslov met him in the early 1990s while Alexander was stationed at the Canadian embassy in Moscow.

== Political career ==
On September 21, 2009, Alexander announced his resignation from the foreign service and his intention to seek the Conservative nomination in the suburban Toronto area riding of Ajax—Pickering.

The choice of Ajax—Pickering made Alexander a parachute candidate, moving to Ajax with his family from their home in Etobicoke. Ajax—Pickering was considered a key battleground riding, held by Liberal Mark Holland. Holland was a Liberal star, well known for his performance during Question Period.

Alexander had been considered a potential star candidate by both the Liberals and Conservatives, both of whom actively recruited him. According to accounts given to the press, Alexander ultimately rejected Michael Ignatieff's offer due to differences in policy over Canada's role in Afghanistan, reportedly due to the party's insistence on ending Canada's combat role in 2011 (a policy subsequently adopted by the majority Conservative government of which Alexander became part). Alexander disputed this, saying he had always had Conservative leanings and that the discussions with the Liberals had never been serious.

Alexander won the seat in the 2011 federal election in a heavily contested race, winning with 24,797 votes over Holland with 21,569.

=== 41st Canadian Parliament ===
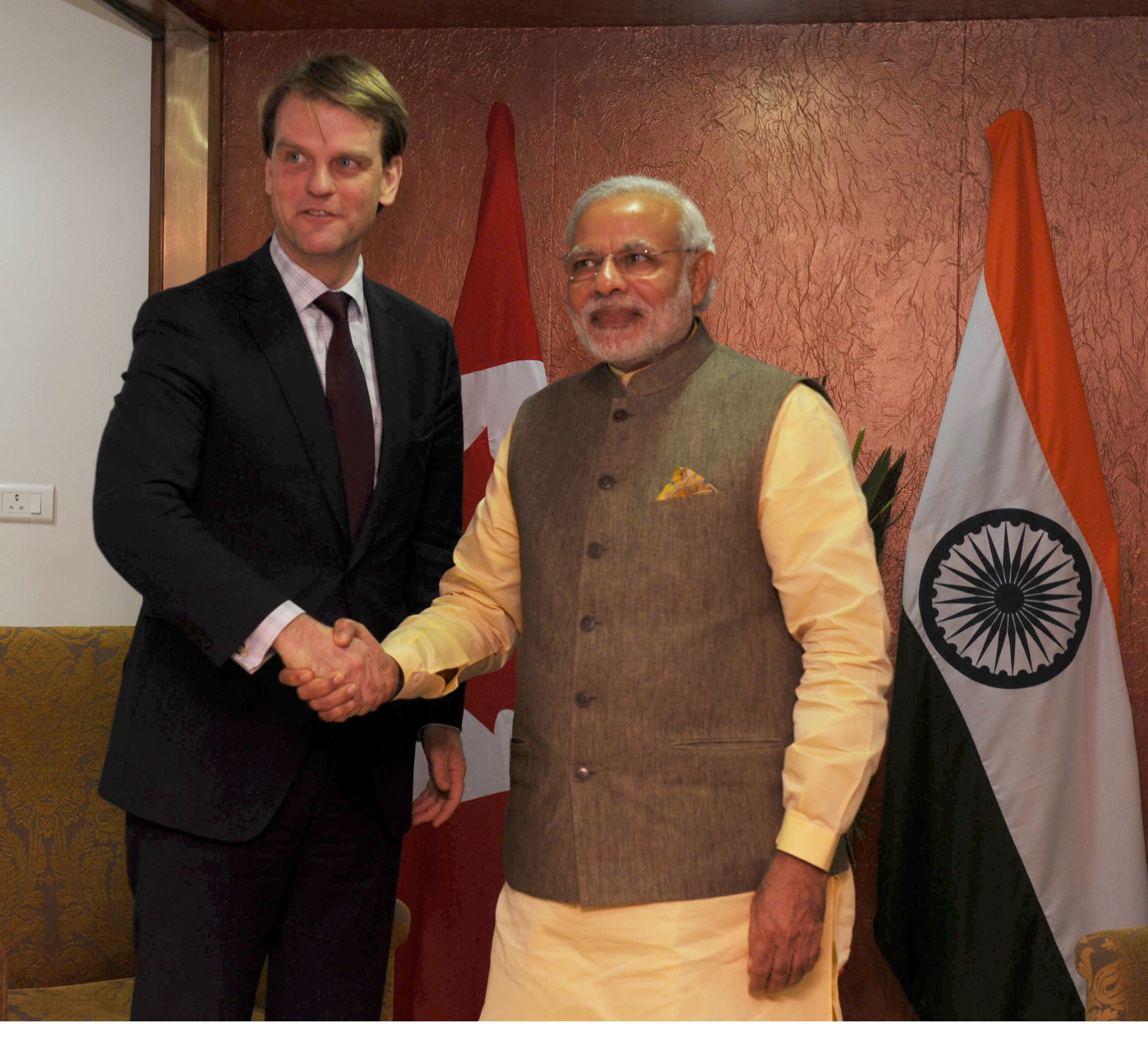
The Prime Minister, Shri Narendra Modi meeting the Minister for citizenship & Immigration of Canada, Mr. Chris Alexander, in Gandhinagar, Gujarat on 11 January 2015

Shortly after taking office in May 2011, Alexander was appointed Parliamentary Secretary to the Minister of Defence Peter MacKay. Alexander remained active on Afghanistan related issues, frequently speaking and writing on this subject. In late 2012, Alexander frequently defended the government's position on the F-35 contract. The procurement was a major political hot potato and the press referred to the dossier as the "worst job in Ottawa". His initial appearances on the topic did not go well; in a CBC interview he claimed the press was confused about the issue and that the government had not actually agreed to purchase the aircraft, while the video roll in the background showed Minister MacKay saying exactly that. A follow-up appearance on CTV News's Question Period show was judged by Canadian journalist Aaron Wherry to have been "a bit better", noting that Alexander had conceded the Auditor General's report on the program had to be taken seriously, and had conveyed that the government was doing just that.

In July 2013, he was promoted to Minister of Citizenship and Immigration. Alexander sponsored Bill C-24, the Strengthening Canadian Citizenship Act, which changed the residency requirements for gaining citizenship to reduce the number of what the party called "Canadians of convenience" with weak bonds to the country. The bill also allowed the Citizenship and Immigration Minister to revoke Canadian citizenship from dual citizens convicted of treason, espionage, or terrorism charges as well as those who engaged in armed conflict against Canada, which The Globe and Mail said in an editorial, effectively created a two-tier Canadian citizenship.

The legislation has had several courtroom challenges. The best-publicized are two: In October 2014, the Act was challenged in court by lawyer Rocco Galati. The judge dismissed the case. It was then challenged again in August 2015 by the British Columbia Civil Liberties Association and the Canadian Association of Refugee Lawyers.

Alexander's time in office was marked by what a number of commentators described as a surprisingly adversarial approach to politics, in contrast with the expectation of some that he would be a moderate figure. A commentator stated that "When you see a guy whose career has been built on diplomacy and a persuasive life in a pugilistic position, it can be a conflicting image." In a June 2015 debate on Twitter, Canadian political journalist Paul Wells criticized Alexander for distortions of Canadian history and of his own policies, adding "Chris Alexander's jaw flaps like a barn door and he has no control over what comes out of it" and "if this is what smart gets us in a cabinet minister, I'd gladly trade it in for some stupid".

=== 2015 election ===
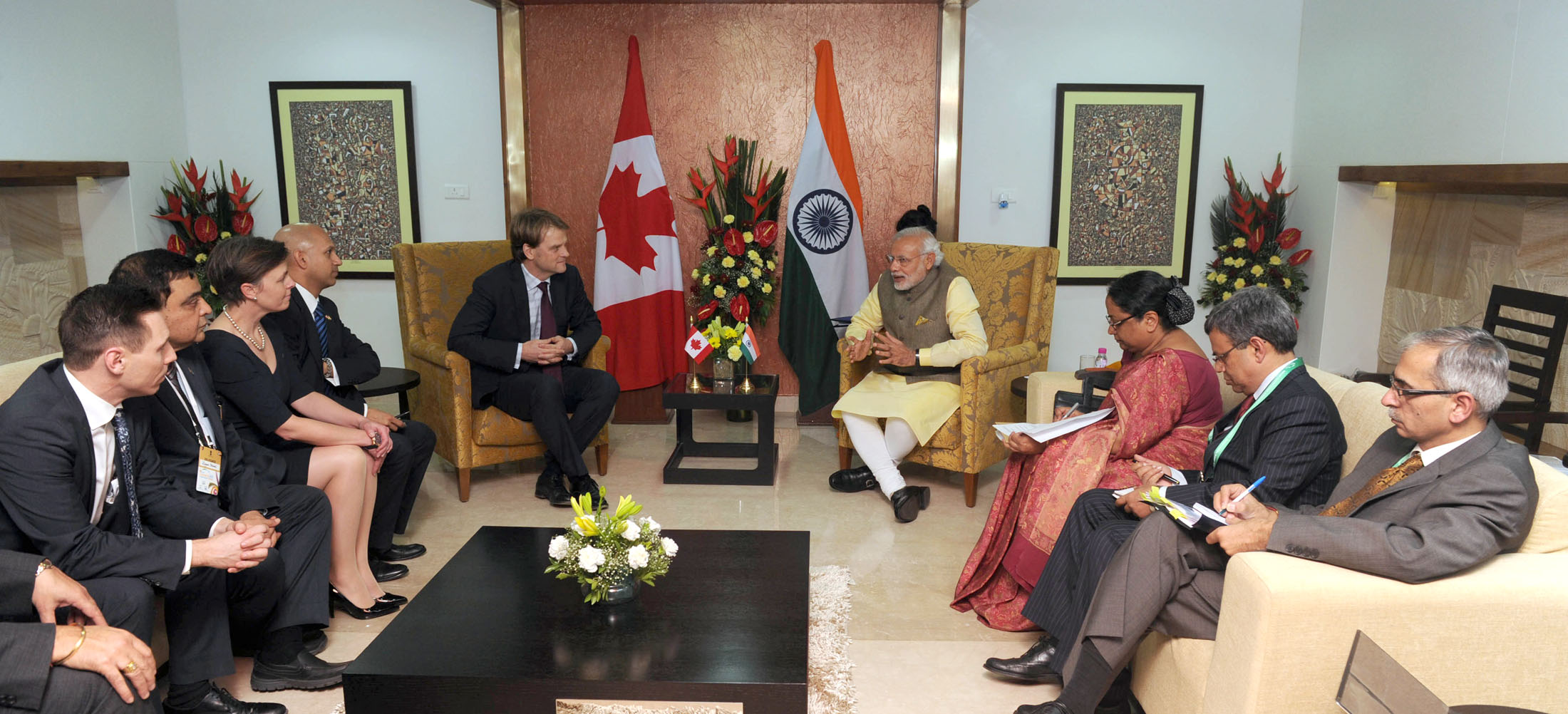
Alexander in India in 2015

For the 2015 election, Alexander ran in Ajax, essentially the southern portion of his old riding. He faced Holland in a rematch.

During the 2015 election campaign, Alexander was known for toeing the party line and accepted the position as front man on a number of highly charged and divisive issues. Many of these, notably the niqāb issue and the proposed "barbaric cultural practices" hotline, were seen as key elements of the ultimate Conservative downfall. Alexander often commented on these issues, in one case tweeting that "Niqab, hijab, burka, wedding veil—face coverings have no place in cit oath-taking!"

On September 2, shortly after the start of the campaign, Alexander became embroiled in the Alan Kurdi affair when Alan's father Abdullah blamed Canadian immigration officials for his son's death. Kurdi stated they attempted to travel to Greece after Immigration Canada refused his asylum request. However, it was immediately noted that no official application had ever been made. In an appearance that night on a CBC News Network's Power & Politics panel discussion, Alexander defended the Harper Government's handling the Syrian refugee crisis. In response to a question where host Rosemary Barton wondered why the government had taken so long to act if the crisis had been going on for years, Alexander suggested the media was partially to blame for the crisis as they had ignored the issue. Calling it "the biggest conflict and humanitarian crisis of our time", he stated that journalists (including Barton) were responsible for not drawing enough attention to the issue and noting that it was the first time he had been on a Power & Politics panel discussion on the topic" Barton responded that Alexander's comments were "completely false", noting that the show had covered the events in Syria 32 times since 2011 and that Alexander himself had been involved in several of these segments.

The next day, rumours circulated that in March 2015, New Westminster—Coquitlam MP Fin Donnelly had personally requested that Alexander look into the refugee application of the Kurdis, who were privately sponsored by Alan's aunt, one of Donnelly's constituents. Alan's aunt clarified that the application was for Alan's uncle, Mohammed, and his family, but that she was planning to apply for Alan's father, Abdullah, once she had enough funds, so she had her MP deliver a letter to Alexander pleading her case. On the same day, Alexander announced that he would be temporarily suspending his campaign for re-election the next morning to return to Ottawa to resume his ministerial duties, receive updates on the refugee crisis, and investigate the case of Alan Kurdi.

On October 8, it was revealed that Canadian immigration officials had been ordered to stop processing all claimants from Syria earlier in the year and that all such claims would have to be vetted by the Prime Minister's Office (PMO) and personally signed off by the Stephen Harper. Processing was stopped for several weeks, and all previous referrals from the UN in 2014 and 2015 were put under review. Alexander stated that this was done to ensure the security of process. The same day, Harper personally denied that his staff had anything to do with the process. He did agree that a review had been started, but he stated that this was not carried out in the PMO and that no security threats were discovered as a part of the investigation.

Days later, just two weeks before the election, sources reported to CTV News that Alexander was one of a dozen Tory MPs in the Greater Toronto Area at risk of being defeated. This came to pass as Alexander won only 16,611 votes to Holland's 27,039—a deficit of almost 12,000 votes—as part of the Conservatives' collapse in southern Ontario (the Tories only retained three seats in the GTA).

A week after the election, Alexander repeated his claim that the media had not sufficiently covered the Syrian refugee crisis and the defeated government's plans in a scrum with Global News. He has subsequently argued in media interviews that in the context of the election he was prevented by his own party from advertising his government's achievements on immigration and refugee policy.

=== 2017 Conservative Party of Canada leadership election ===
On October 12, 2016, Alexander announced his intention to run for the leadership of the Conservative Party of Canada. His leadership platform detailed policies on employment, taxation, innovation, families, education, competitiveness, energy self-sufficiency, cities, agriculture, poverty, homelessness, First Nations peoples, the Métis, refugees, the Monarchy, justice, health care, protecting wilderness, forestry, mining, international diplomacy, terrorism, democratic reform, cyber-security, Canadian culture, northern development, and national defence.

During the campaign, he advocated increased immigration as the key to economic growth; in this regard, he proposed increasing immigration to 400,000 per year, including 40,000 refugees. He also called for doubling defence spending and "for an accelerated push to settle all outstanding land claims and to sign treaties with First Nations communities that would empower them to govern themselves".

Alexander finished 10th in a field of 14 candidates (the 11th-place candidate having withdrawn several weeks before the ballot). He received a maximum of 1.23 per cent of the total vote before being eliminated in the fifth of thirteen rounds of voting.

=== 2026 Toronto mayoral election ===
On July 29, 2026, Alexander announced his campaign for mayor of Toronto. On October 6, 2026, he withdrew from the election.

== Post-political career ==
Since the 2017 Conservative Party leadership election, Alexander has maintained a relatively low public profile. He remains an occasional commentator in Canadian media, offering views that are sometimes at odds with those of the Conservative Party; for example, Alexander defended the UN Migration Pact which was criticized by Conservatives.

During the 2021 fall of Kabul, Alexander commented in a Globe and Mail op-ed entitled "The strategy for Afghanistan went off course long before the U.S. exit" that beginning with the 2010 International Conference on Afghanistan, UN and Western officials "ignored Pakistani goals hiding in plain sight", and quoted "former army chief and ideological godfather of Pakistan's proxy war in Afghanistan" Mirza Aslam Beg's partisanship as far back as August 2011 and as recently as March 2021. He observed that two of Beg's "successors as Pakistan's top general" commanded Pakistani forces "in Abbottabad when Osama bin Laden was living there" prior to his death in May 2011, while he called for sanctions against Pakistan.

=== Accusations of Russian spies in the media ===
On October 24, 2024, Alexander testified before Canada's national security committee that a Canadian journalist, David Pugliese, had operated as a spy for the KGB and alleged he was still spying for the Russian government. Alexander referenced photocopies of what he purported to be 40-year-old KGB documents found in an archive somewhere in Ukraine that he obtained through unclear means. In a public statement, Postmedia, the parent company of the Ottawa Citizen newspaper, called Alexander’s allegations “ridiculous and baseless,” emphasizing that the journalist is a “valued, trusted and esteemed member of the Ottawa Citizen.” The details of the purported Russian documents contained errors of fact about where Pugliese lived. A July report that solicited input from leading experts in typography and graphology determined that the documents Chris Alexander submitted to a parliamentary committee were forgeries, based on repeated dust speck patterns, identical handwriting attributed to different individuals, and the usage of a post-Soviet era font. Global News and historian Per Rudling from Sweden's Lund University independently confirmed that archives in Kyiv did not have originals of the documents, which were conspicuously missing catalogue numbers. Alexander has consistently refused to repeat his claims when not protected from defamation by parliamentary privilege, citing national security grounds.

=== Recognition and awards ===
In 2005, Alexander was selected as a Young Global Leader, an adjunct to the World Economic Forum. In 2006, Toronto-based executive recruiting firm Caldwell Partners chose him as one of Canada's "Top 40 Under 40". He received the Atlantic Council of Canada Award in 2007, and in 2008 was made a 1st Class Grand Officer of the Order of the Star of Italian Solidarity. In 2009 he was Honorary Chair of the UTS Centenary. In 2010, he received the Birchall Leadership Award.

== Electoral record ==
=== Municipal ===
2026 Toronto mayoral election
Mayoral candidate	Votes	%
Olivia Chow	532,201	54.16%
Brad Bradford	404,013	41.11%
Braeden Chow	8,102	0.82%
Chris Alexander	3,550	0.36%
Edward Gong	3,443	0.35%
Laura Dean	2,224	0.23%
Darrell Brown	2,077	0.21%
Imad Abdulkadir	1,873	0.19%
Bahira Abdulsalam	1,696	0.17%
Rick Lee	1,288	0.13%
Logan Choy	1,282	0.13%
Sandeep Srivastava	1,149	0.12%
Kevin Clarke	1,089	0.11%
Georgios Kalkounis	1,085	0.11%
Roberto Curto	959	0.10%
Sarah McVie	957	0.10%
Jamie Atkinson	932	0.09%
Amy Rosen	919	0.09%
Paul Collins	845	0.09%
Lyall Sanders	784	0.08%
Mohamad Kaaki	727	0.07%
Joshua Thompson	709	0.07%
Brian Buffey	649	0.07%
Laura Ellis	630	0.06%
Michael Lamoureux	570	0.06%
Robert Shusterman	522	0.05%
Cory Deville	485	0.05%
Odessa Paloma Parker	457	0.05%
Martin Fraser	437	0.04%
Alton Frederick	432	0.04%
Heather He	421	0.04%
Mostafa Zandkarimi	396	0.04%
Faizan Haider	370	0.04%
Alex Cruze	366	0.04%
Kuo Yu Tong	366	0.04%
Habiba Desai	364	0.04%
Weizhen Tang	354	0.04%
Francis Mercieca	352	0.04%
Thomas Hall	341	0.03%
Faisal Razi	337	0.03%
Gus Prokos	327	0.03%
Jack Hartley	322	0.03%
Joseph Osuji	320	0.03%
Naomi Sayers	274	0.03%
Peter Handjis	270	0.03%
Isidoros Kyrlangitses	256	0.03%
Leila Yohannes	206	0.02%
Reagan Levermany	202	0.02%
Eddie Mayanja	193	0.02%
Wincess Dorville	175	0.02%
Henoke Yohannes	157	0.02%
Jeffery Tunney	133	0.01%
Jack Weenen	72	0.01%
Total	982,660	100%
Source: City of Toronto (unofficial results)

=== Ajax ===
2015 Canadian federal election: Ajax
Party	Candidate	Votes	%	±%	Expenditures
Liberal	Mark Holland	31,458	55.87	+17.94	$98,658.57
Conservative	Chris Alexander	19,374	34.41	−9.82	$154,560.57
New Democratic	Stephanie Brown	4,630	8.22	−6.78	$3,065.75
Green	Jeff Hill	788	1.40	−1.32	$717.00
United	Bob Kesic	57	0.10	-0.02	–
Total valid votes/expense limit		56,307	99.64		$222,192.40
Total rejected ballots		206	0.36	–	
Turnout		56,513	66.29	–	
Eligible voters		85,251			
Liberal gain from Conservative		Swing		+13.88	
Source: Elections Canada

=== Ajax—Pickering ===
2011 Canadian federal election: Ajax—Pickering
Party	Candidate	Votes	%	±%	Expenditures
Conservative	Chris Alexander	24,797	44.07	+6.12	
Liberal	Mark Holland	21,569	38.33	-6.20	
New Democratic	Jim Koppens	8,284	14.72	+5.64	
Green	Mihkel Harilaid	1,621	2.88	-4.40	
United	Bob Kesic	72	0.13	–	
Total valid votes/expense limit		56,268	100.00		
Total rejected ballots		187	0.33	-0.05	
Turnout		56,455	61.22		
Conservative gain from Liberal		Swing		+6.16	
