= Ajax—Pickering =

Former federal electoral district in Ontario, Canada

Ontario electoral district
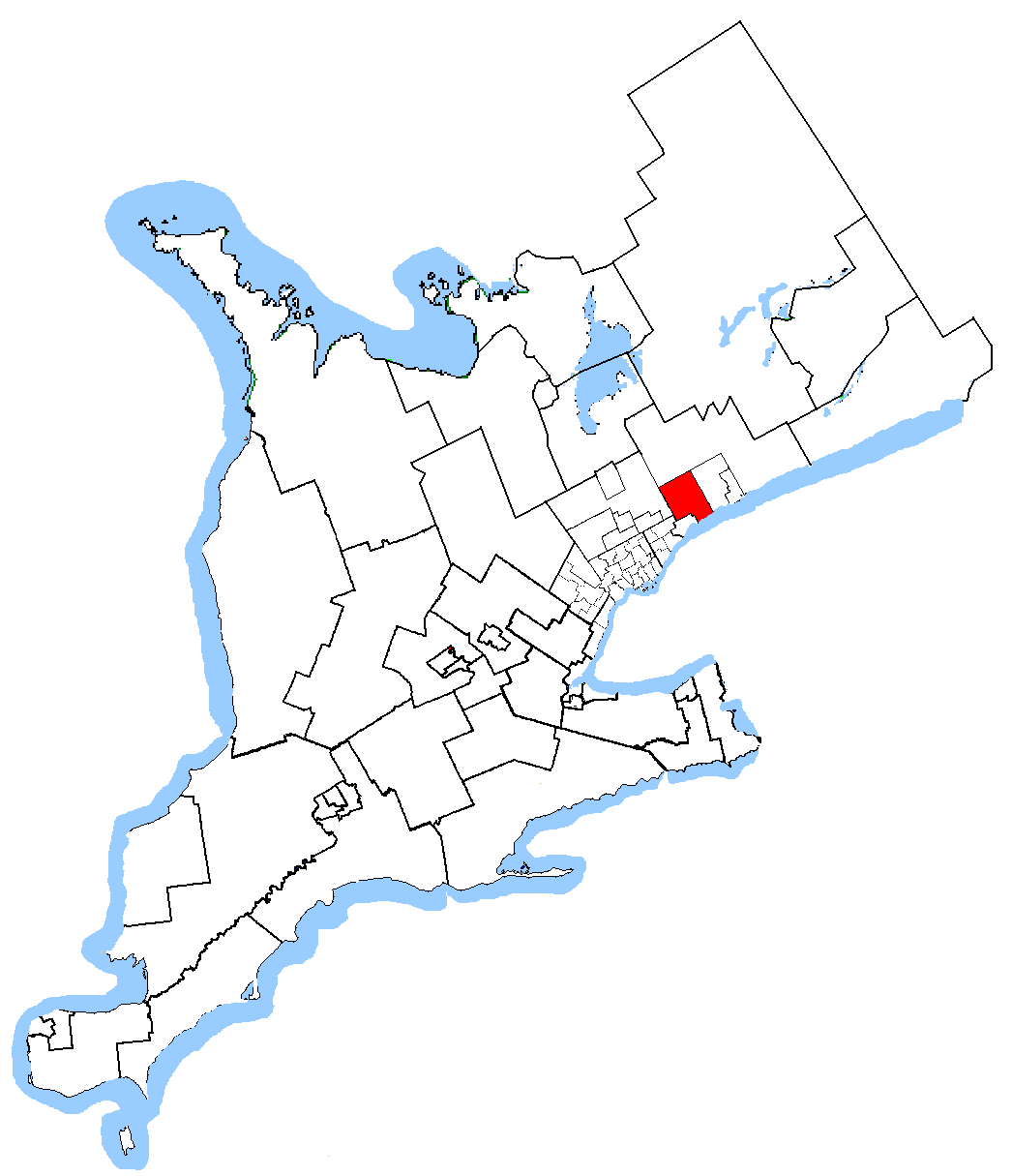
- Ajax—Pickering electoral district
- Coordinates: 43°51′02″N 79°03′18″W; Location of the constituency office (as of 12 July 2010)

Defunct federal electoral district
- Legislature: House of Commons
- District created: 2003
- District abolished: 2013
- First contested: 2004
- Last contested: 2011
- District webpage: profile, map

Demographics
- Population (2011): 137,217
- Electors (2011): 86,159
- Area (km²): 272.24
- Census division(s): Durham
- Census subdivision(s): Ajax, Pickering

Ajax—Pickering was a federal electoral district in Ontario, Canada, that had been represented in the House of Commons of Canada since 2011 by Conservative MP Chris Alexander.

Its population in 2001 was 100,215. The district included the town of Ajax and the northern part of the city of Pickering in the eastern suburbs of Toronto. The electoral district was created in 2003: 57.6% of the population of the riding came from 43.3% of Pickering—Ajax—Uxbridge and 44.8% from Whitby—Ajax.

Following the Canadian federal electoral redistribution, 2012, the riding was dissolved. The southern portion–including all of Ajax–became Ajax, while the northern portion became part of Pickering—Uxbridge.

== Boundaries ==
Consisting of that part of the Regional Municipality of Durham composed of:

(a) the Town of Ajax; and

(b) that part of the City of Pickering lying northerly and easterly of a line described as follows: commencing at the intersection of the westerly limit of said city with Finch Avenue; thence easterly along said avenue to Valley Farm Road; thence southerly along said road and its production to Ontario Highway 401; thence northeasterly along said highway to Brock Road; thence southerly along said road and its production to the southerly limit of said city.

== Member of Parliament ==
This riding has elected the following members of Parliament:

Parliament	Years	Member	Party
Ajax—Pickering; Riding created from Pickering—Ajax—Uxbridge and Whitby—Ajax
38th	2004–2006	Mark Holland	Liberal
39th	2006–2008	Mark Holland	Liberal
40th	2008–2011	Mark Holland	Liberal
41st	2011–2015	Chris Alexander	Conservative
Riding dissolved into Pickering—Uxbridge and Ajax

== Election results ==
2011 Canadian federal election
Party	Candidate	Votes	%	±%	Expenditures
Conservative	Chris Alexander	24,797	44.07	+6.12	
Liberal	Mark Holland	21,569	38.33	-6.20	
New Democratic	Jim Koppens	8,284	14.72	+5.64	
Green	Mihkel Harilaid	1,621	2.88	-4.40	
United	Bob Kesic	72	0.13	–	
Total valid votes/expense limit		56,268	100.00		
Total rejected ballots		187	0.33	-0.05	
Turnout		56,455	61.22		
Conservative gain from Liberal		Swing		+6.16	

2008 Canadian federal election
Party	Candidate	Votes	%	±%	Expenditures
Liberal	Mark Holland	21,675	44.53	-4.9	$53,225
Conservative	Rick Johnson	18,471	37.95	+5.2	$87,925
New Democratic	Bala Thavarajasoorier	4,422	9.08	-3.6	$1,541
Green	Mike Harilaid	3,543	7.28	+3.1	$3,531
Christian Heritage	Kevin Norng	398	0.82	0.0	$1,171
Libertarian	Stephanie Wilson	167	0.34	N/A	$20
Total valid votes/expense limit		48,676	100	$89,065	
Total rejected ballots		186	0.38		
Turnout		48,862			
Liberal hold		Swing		-5.05	

2006 Canadian federal election
Party	Candidate	Votes	%	±%	Expenditures
Liberal	Mark Holland	25,636	49.38	-0.39	$43,781
Conservative	Rondo Thomas	16,992	32.73	-0.90	$77,308
New Democratic	Kevin Modeste	6,655	12.82	+0.70	$8,405
Green	Russell Korus	2,199	4.24	-0.23	$948
Christian Heritage	Kevin Norng	435	0.84	n/a	$7,950
Total valid votes/expense limit		51,917	100.00	$77,681	
Liberal hold		Swing		+0.51	

2004 Canadian federal election
Party	Candidate	Votes	%	±%
Liberal	Mark Holland	21,706	49.77	-7.67
Conservative	René Soetens	14,666	33.63	-3.83
New Democratic	Kevin Modeste	5,286	12.12	+8.10
Green	Karen MacDonald	1,951	4.47	–
Total valid votes		43,609		
Liberal notional hold		Swing		-3.84

2000 federal election poll-by-poll redistribution
Party	Vote	%
Liberal	19,974	57.44
Canadian Alliance	8,260	23.75
Progressive Conservative	4,767	13.71
New Democratic	1,425	4.10
Others	348	1.00

== See also ==
- List of Canadian electoral districts
- Historical federal electoral districts of Canada
