= Norman Cafik =

Canadian politician

The Honourable Norman Augustine Cafik PC

Member of the Canada Parliament for Ontario
- In office 1968–1979
- Preceded by: Michael Starr
- Succeeded by: Thomas Fennell

Personal details
- Born: December 29, 1928 Pickering, Ontario
- Died: September 30, 2016 (aged 87) Sidney, British Columbia
- Party: Liberal
- Spouse: Patricia Ann Cafik,
- Children: Monica, Julianna, Anthony, Yvonne, and Michael
- Cabinet: Minister of State (Multiculturalism)

Norman Augustine Cafik, PC (December 29, 1928 – September 30, 2016) was a Canadian politician.

Born in Pickering, Ontario of a Ukrainian-Polish father and a Scottish-Irish mother, Cafik was unsuccessful in his attempts to win a seat in the House of Commons of Canada in the 1962 and 1963 elections, but was elected as the Liberal Member of Parliament (MP) for the riding of Ontario in the 1968 election.

Cafik's 1972 re-election, defeating former Diefenbaker era minister Frank Charles McGee was particularly notable. He was initially reported to have lost his riding, yielding a 108-seat tie between the Stanfield Progressive Conservatives and the Trudeau Liberals. Subsequent re-count confirmed Cafik's victory over McGee by 4 votes, giving the Liberals a two-seat lead in the minority parliament.

He attempted to move to provincial politics, running in 1973 for the leadership of the Ontario Liberal Party. He lost on the third ballot of the leadership convention to Robert Nixon.

In 1977, he was the second person of Ukrainian descent to be appointed to the Canadian Cabinet when Prime Minister Pierre Trudeau made him Minister of State for Multiculturalism. (Michael Starr was appointed by John Diefenbaker as the first Ukrainian in Cabinet.) He lost his seat in the House in the 1979 election that defeated the Trudeau government and returned to private life. He died on September 30, 2016.
