= Ontario (federal electoral district) =

Former federal electoral district in Ontario, Canada

Ontario electoral district

Defunct federal electoral district
- Legislature: House of Commons
- District created: 1924
- District abolished: 1996
- First contested: 1925
- Last contested: 1993

Demographics
- Population (1991): 183,160

Ontario was a federal electoral district represented in the House of Commons of Canada from 1925 to 1997. It was located in the province of Ontario. This riding was created in 1924 from Ontario South riding.

It initially consisted of the townships of Pickering, Whitby (East and West), Reach, and Scugog, and the city of Oshawa in the county of Ontario. In 1947, the townships Scott and Uxbridge were added to the riding.

In 1966, it was redefined to consist of, in the County of Ontario, the Townships of Pickering, Reach, Scott, Scugog, Uxbridge, East Whitby and Whitby (excluding the area between the west limit of the City of Oshawa and the east limit of the Town of Whitby lying south of the road allowance between Concessions 2 and 3), and, in the County of York, the Townships of Georgina and North Gwillimbury, and all the islands of Georgina Island Indian Reserve No. 33.

In 1976, it was redefined to consist of the Township of Uxbridge, and the Towns of Ajax, Pickering and Whitby. In 1987, the Township of Uxbridge was excluded from the riding, along with the part of the Town of Whitby north of Taunton Road East and Taunton Road West (Durham Regional Road No. 4).

The electoral district was abolished in 1996 when it was redistributed between Pickering—Ajax—Uxbridge and Whitby—Ajax ridings.

== Members of Parliament ==
This riding has elected the following members of Parliament:

| Parliament | Years | Member | Party |
|---|---|---|---|
Riding created from Ontario South
| 15th | 1925–1926 | Thomas Erlin Kaiser | Conservative |
| 16th | 1926–1930 | Thomas Erlin Kaiser | Conservative |
| 17th | 1930–1935 | William Henry Moore | Liberal |
| 18th | 1935–1940 | William Henry Moore | Liberal |
| 19th | 1940–1945 | William Henry Moore | Liberal |
| 20th | 1945–1948† | W. E. N. Sinclair | Liberal |
| 20th | 1948–1949 | Arthur Henry Williams | Co-operative Commonwealth |
| 21st | 1949–1952 | Walter Thomson | Liberal |
| 21st | 1952–1953 | Michael Starr | Progressive Conservative |
| 22nd | 1953–1957 | Michael Starr | Progressive Conservative |
| 23rd | 1957–1958 | Michael Starr | Progressive Conservative |
| 24th | 1958–1962 | Michael Starr | Progressive Conservative |
| 25th | 1962–1963 | Michael Starr | Progressive Conservative |
| 26th | 1963–1965 | Michael Starr | Progressive Conservative |
| 27th | 1965–1968 | Michael Starr | Progressive Conservative |
| 28th | 1968–1972 | Norman Cafik | Liberal |
| 29th | 1972–1974 | Norman Cafik | Liberal |
| 30th | 1974–1979 | Norman Cafik | Liberal |
| 31st | 1979–1980 | Thomas Fennell | Progressive Conservative |
| 32nd | 1980–1984 | Thomas Fennell | Progressive Conservative |
| 33rd | 1984–1988 | Thomas Fennell | Progressive Conservative |
| 34th | 1988–1993 | René Soetens | Progressive Conservative |
| 35th | 1993–1997 | Dan McTeague | Liberal |
Riding dissolved into Pickering—Ajax—Uxbridge and Whitby—Ajax

== Election results ==
1925 Canadian federal election: Ontario
| Party | Candidate | Votes |
|---|---|---|
| Conservative | Thomas Erlin Kaiser | 7,835 |
| Liberal | Lawson Omar Clifford | 6,595 |

1926 Canadian federal election: Ontario
| Party | Candidate | Votes |
|---|---|---|
| Conservative | Thomas Erlin Kaiser | 8,567 |
| Liberal | William Henry Moore | 7,689 |

1930 Canadian federal election: Ontario
| Party | Candidate | Votes |
|---|---|---|
| Liberal | William Henry Moore | 10,116 |
| Conservative | Thomas Erlin Kaiser | 9,646 |

1935 Canadian federal election: Ontario
| Party | Candidate | Votes |
|---|---|---|
| Liberal | William Henry Moore | 10,228 |
| Conservative | Alex C. Hall | 7,300 |
| Co-operative Commonwealth | William Edmund Noble | 1,847 |
| Reconstruction | Robert Myers Holtby | 1,412 |

1940 Canadian federal election: Ontario
| Party | Candidate | Votes |
|---|---|---|
| Liberal | William Henry Moore | 12,176 |
| National Government | Harry Allen Newman | 7,914 |

1945 Canadian federal election: Ontario
| Party | Candidate | Votes |
|---|---|---|
| Liberal | W. E. N. Sinclair | 12,079 |
| Progressive Conservative | James Ross MacBrien | 8,996 |
| Co-operative Commonwealth | Robert Lorne McTavish | 4,389 |
| Labor–Progressive | Alexander James Turner | 671 |

By-election: Due to Mr. Sinclair's death, 6 June 1948: Ontario
| Party | Candidate | Votes |
|---|---|---|
| Co-operative Commonwealth | Arthur Henry Williams | 10,187 |
| Liberal | Lyman Alfred Gifford | 8,311 |
| Progressive Conservative | Frank McCallum | 7,541 |

1949 Canadian federal election: Ontario
| Party | Candidate | Votes |
|---|---|---|
| Liberal | Walter Thomson | 13,412 |
| Progressive Conservative | Frank McCallum | 9,803 |
| Co-operative Commonwealth | Arthur Henry Williams | 9,344 |

By-election: On Mr. Thomson's resignation, 26 May 1952: Ontario
| Party | Candidate | Votes |
|---|---|---|
| Progressive Conservative | Michael Starr | 12,275 |
| Liberal | John Legge Lay | 9,091 |
| Co-operative Commonwealth | Herbert Roy Scott | 8,464 |

1953 Canadian federal election: Ontario
| Party | Candidate | Votes |
|---|---|---|
| Progressive Conservative | Michael Starr | 12,482 |
| Liberal | John Lay | 11,285 |
| Co-operative Commonwealth | J. Wesley Powers | 5,524 |
| Labor–Progressive | Thomas Lloyd Peel | 393 |

1957 Canadian federal election: Ontario
| Party | Candidate | Votes |
|---|---|---|
| Progressive Conservative | Michael Starr | 18,468 |
| Co-operative Commonwealth | W. John Naylor | 13,806 |
| Liberal | Claude H. Vipond | 10,896 |

1958 Canadian federal election: Ontario
| Party | Candidate | Votes |
|---|---|---|
| Progressive Conservative | Michael Starr | 26,887 |
| Liberal | Claude H. Vipond | 10,848 |
| Co-operative Commonwealth | John Brady | 8,023 |
| Independent | Helge Neilson | 248 |

1962 Canadian federal election: Ontario
| Party | Candidate | Votes |
|---|---|---|
| Progressive Conservative | Michael Starr | 23,158 |
| Liberal | Norman Cafik | 16,051 |
| New Democratic | Aileen Hall | 14,461 |
| Social Credit | Allan A. Alton | 488 |

1963 Canadian federal election: Ontario
| Party | Candidate | Votes |
|---|---|---|
| Progressive Conservative | Michael Starr | 22,902 |
| Liberal | Norman Cafik | 20,174 |
| New Democratic | Aileen Hall | 15,020 |

1965 Canadian federal election: Ontario
| Party | Candidate | Votes |
|---|---|---|
| Progressive Conservative | Michael Starr | 22,752 |
| Liberal | Claude Vipond | 20,515 |
| New Democratic | Oliver Hodges | 16,207 |
| Independent | James Edward Rundle | 1,026 |

1968 Canadian federal election: Ontario
| Party | Candidate | Votes |
|---|---|---|
| Liberal | Norman Cafik | 13,483 |
| Progressive Conservative | Clark T. Muirhead | 10,579 |
| New Democratic | Robert L. Wing | 7,607 |

1972 Canadian federal election: Ontario
| Party | Candidate | Votes |
|---|---|---|
| Liberal | Norman Cafik | 16,328 |
| Progressive Conservative | Frank McGee | 16,324 |
| New Democratic | Alban C. Ward | 9,498 |

1974 Canadian federal election: Ontario
| Party | Candidate | Votes |
|---|---|---|
| Liberal | Norman Cafik | 20,096 |
| Progressive Conservative | Joyce Bowerman | 15,590 |
| New Democratic | Bill Lishman | 6,649 |

1979 Canadian federal election: Ontario
| Party | Candidate | Votes |
|---|---|---|
| Progressive Conservative | Thomas Fennell | 22,583 |
| Liberal | Norman Cafik | 15,730 |
| New Democratic | Geoff Rison | 11,510 |
| Libertarian | Rolf H. Posma | 160 |
| Marxist–Leninist | Dawn Carrell | 72 |

1980 Canadian federal election: Ontario
| Party | Candidate | Votes |
|---|---|---|
| Progressive Conservative | Thomas Fennell | 19,963 |
| Liberal | Doug Dickerson | 15,494 |
| New Democratic | Geoff Rison | 12,812 |
| Rhinoceros | J.C. Stranart | 313 |
| Libertarian | Rolf H. Posma | 211 |
| Marxist–Leninist | Dawn Carrell | 42 |

1984 Canadian federal election: Ontario
| Party | Candidate | Votes |
|---|---|---|
| Progressive Conservative | Thomas Fennell | 35,163 |
| Liberal | Gary Herrema | 14,519 |
| New Democratic | Geoff Rison | 12,995 |

1988 Canadian federal election: Ontario
| Party | Candidate | Votes |
|---|---|---|
| Progressive Conservative | René Soetens | 34,969 |
| Liberal | John Roberts | 23,091 |
| New Democratic | Jim Wiseman | 12,751 |
| Libertarian | D'Arcy Cain | 485 |
| Commonwealth of Canada | Val Haché | 147 |

1993 Canadian federal election
| Party | Candidate | Votes | % |
|---|---|---|---|
| Liberal | Dan McTeague | 38,680 | 43.35 |
| Reform | Don Sullivan | 28,097 | 31.49 |
| Progressive Conservative | René Soetens | 16,872 | 18.91 |
| New Democratic | Lynn Jacklin | 2,746 | 3.08 |
| National | Rob McMenemy | 869 | 0.97 |
| Independent | Doug Anderson | 692 | 0.78 |
| Libertarian | George S. Kozaroff | 424 | 0.48 |
| Green | Scott Laycox | 402 | 0.45 |
| Natural Law | Gerard Morris | 352 | 0.39 |
| Commonwealth of Canada | Val Haché | 55 | 0.06 |
| Abolitionist | Peter Woods | 42 | 0.05 |

== See also ==
- List of Canadian electoral districts
- Historical federal electoral districts of Canada
