= Ajax (federal electoral district) =

Federal electoral district in Ontario, Canada

Ontario electoral district
- Interactive map of riding boundaries from the 2015 federal election
- Coordinates: 43°51′16″N 79°03′36″W; Location of the federal constituency office (as of 7 May 2016)

Federal electoral district
- Legislature: House of Commons
MP
Jennifer McKelvie
Liberal
- District created: 2013
- First contested: 2015
- Last contested: 2025
- District webpage: profile, map

Demographics
- Population (2021): 126,666
- Electors (2015): 83,542
- Area (km²): 67.00
- Pop. density (per km²): 1,890.5
- Census division: Durham
- Census subdivision: Ajax

Ajax is a federal electoral district in the Durham Region of Ontario.

Ajax was created by the 2012 riding redistribution from the portion of Ajax—Pickering consisting of the entire town of Ajax, Ontario, and was legally defined in the 2013 representation order. It came into effect in time for the 2015 Canadian federal election.

== Demographics ==
According to the 2021 Canadian census

Languages: 64.8% English, 5.0% Tamil, 3.7% Urdu, 2.2% Tagalog, 1.5% Dari, 1.2% Gujarati, 1.2% Arabic, 1.1% French, 1.0% Punjabi, 1.0% Spanish, 1.0% Mandarin
Religions: 50.8% Christian (22.2% Catholic, 3.7% Pentecostal, 3.5% Anglican, 2.5% Christian Orthodox, 2.1% United Church, 1.3% Baptist, 1.1% Presbyterian, 14.4% None), 14.1% Muslim, 11.6% Hindu, 1.3% Sikh, 20.8% None
Median income: $42,400 (2020)
Average income: $54,300 (2020)

Panethnic groups in Ajax (2011−2021)
Panethnic group	2021		2016		2011	
Panethnic group	Pop.	%	Pop.	%	Pop.	%
European (Note: Statistic includes all persons that did not make up part of a visible minority or an indigenous identity.)	43,420	34.39%	50,450	42.33%	58,145	53.24%
South Asian	33,055	26.18%	24,895	20.89%	15,020	13.75%
African	21,210	16.8%	19,860	16.66%	17,505	16.03%
Southeast Asian (Note: Statistic includes total responses of "Filipino" and "Southeast Asian" under visible minority section on census.)	7,495	5.94%	6,350	5.33%	5,465	5%
Middle Eastern (Note: Statistic includes total responses of "West Asian" and "Arab" under visible minority section on census.)	6,250	4.95%	4,875	4.09%	2,935	2.69%
East Asian (Note: Statistic includes total responses of "Chinese", "Korean", and "Japanese" under visible minority section on census.)	4,240	3.36%	3,785	3.18%	3,070	2.81%
Latin American	1,695	1.34%	1,670	1.4%	1,070	0.98%
Indigenous	1,270	1.01%	1,190	1%	1,080	0.99%
Other/multiracial (Note: Statistic includes total responses of "Visible minority, n.i.e." and "Multiple visible minorities" under visible minority section on census.)	7,615	6.03%	6,095	5.11%	4,935	4.52%
Total responses	126,245	99.67%	119,175	99.58%	109,220	99.65%
Total population	126,666	100%	119,677	100%	109,600	100%
Notes: Totals greater than 100% due to multiple origin responses. Demographics based on 2012 Canadian federal electoral redistribution riding boundaries.

== Riding associations ==
Riding associations are the local branches of the national political parties:

Party	Association name	CEO	HQ city
Conservative Party of Canada	Ajax Conservative Association	Dave Saunders	Ajax
Green Party of Canada	Ajax Green Party Association	Diarmuid J. O'Connor	Ajax
Liberal Party of Canada	Ajax Federal Liberal Association	Kamini Sahadeo	Ajax
New Democratic Party	Ajax Federal NDP Riding Association	Shannon Cruickshank	Ottawa

== Members of Parliament ==
This riding has elected the following members of the House of Commons of Canada:

Parliament	Years	Member	Party
Riding created from Ajax—Pickering
42nd	2015–2019	Mark Holland	Liberal
43rd	2019–2021	Mark Holland	Liberal
44th	2021–2025	Mark Holland	Liberal
45th	2025–present	Jennifer McKelvie	Liberal

== Election results ==
Graph of general election results in Ajax (minor parties that never got 2% of the vote or didn't run consistently are omitted)

2025 Canadian federal election
Party	Candidate	Votes	%	±%	Expenditures
Liberal	Jennifer McKelvie	36,975	56.32	−0.51	
Conservative	Greg Brady	25,658	39.08	+12.48	
New Democratic	Kyle Forster	1,762	2.68	−11.36	
Centrist	Faisal Ali	643	0.98	N/A	
Green	Leigh Paulseth	612	0.93	−1.59	
Total valid votes/expense limit		65,650	99.27		
Total rejected ballots		484	0.73		
Turnout		66,134	67.89		
Eligible voters		97,407			
Liberal hold		Swing		−6.50	
Source: Elections Canada
Note: number of eligible voters does not include voting day registrations.

2021 Canadian federal election
Party	Candidate	Votes	%	±%	Expenditures
Liberal	Mark Holland	28,279	56.83	–0.85	$61,841.13
Conservative	Arshad Awan	13,237	26.60	+0.60	$37,722.66
New Democratic	Monique Hughes	6,988	14.04	+2.51	$3,075.61
Green	Leigh Paulseth	1,254	2.52	–0.82	$11,493.41
Total valid votes/expense limit		49,658	100.00	–	$120,937.77
Total rejected ballots		525	1.04	+0.25	
Turnout		50,283	54.12	–11.86	
Eligible voters		92,907			
Liberal hold		Swing		–0.73	
Source: Elections Canada

2019 Canadian federal election
Party	Candidate	Votes	%	±%	Expenditures
Liberal	Mark Holland	35,198	57.68	+1.81	$64,483.26
Conservative	Tom Dingwall	15,864	26.00	-8.41	$102,214.59
New Democratic	Shokat Malik	7,033	11.53	+3.30	$9,641.03
Green	Maia Knight	2,040	3.34	+1.94	$1,882.83
People's	Susanna Russo	588	0.96		$3,679.53
Independent	Allen Keith Hadley	186	0.30		$1,441.93
Independent	Intab Ali	111	0.18		none listed
Total valid votes/expense limit		61,020	99.21		
Total rejected ballots		487	0.79	+0.43	
Turnout		61,507	65.98	-0.31	
Eligible voters		93,215			
Liberal hold		Swing		+5.11	
Source: Elections Canada

2015 Canadian federal election
Party	Candidate	Votes	%	±%	Expenditures
Liberal	Mark Holland	31,458	55.87	+17.94	$98,658.57
Conservative	Chris Alexander	19,374	34.41	−9.82	$154,560.57
New Democratic	Stephanie Brown	4,630	8.22	−6.78	$3,065.75
Green	Jeff Hill	788	1.40	−1.32	$717.00
United	Bob Kesic	57	0.10	-0.02	–
Total valid votes/expense limit		56,307	99.64		$222,192.40
Total rejected ballots		206	0.36	–	
Turnout		56,513	66.29	–	
Eligible voters		85,251			
Liberal gain from Conservative		Swing		+13.88	
Source: Elections Canada

2011 federal election poll-by-poll redistribution
Party	Vote	%
Conservative	19,535	44.23
Liberal	16,753	37.93
New Democratic	6,624	15.00
Green	1,200	2.72
United	53	0.12

== See also ==
- List of Canadian electoral districts
- Historical federal electoral districts of Canada
