= Michael Starr (politician) =

Canadian politician

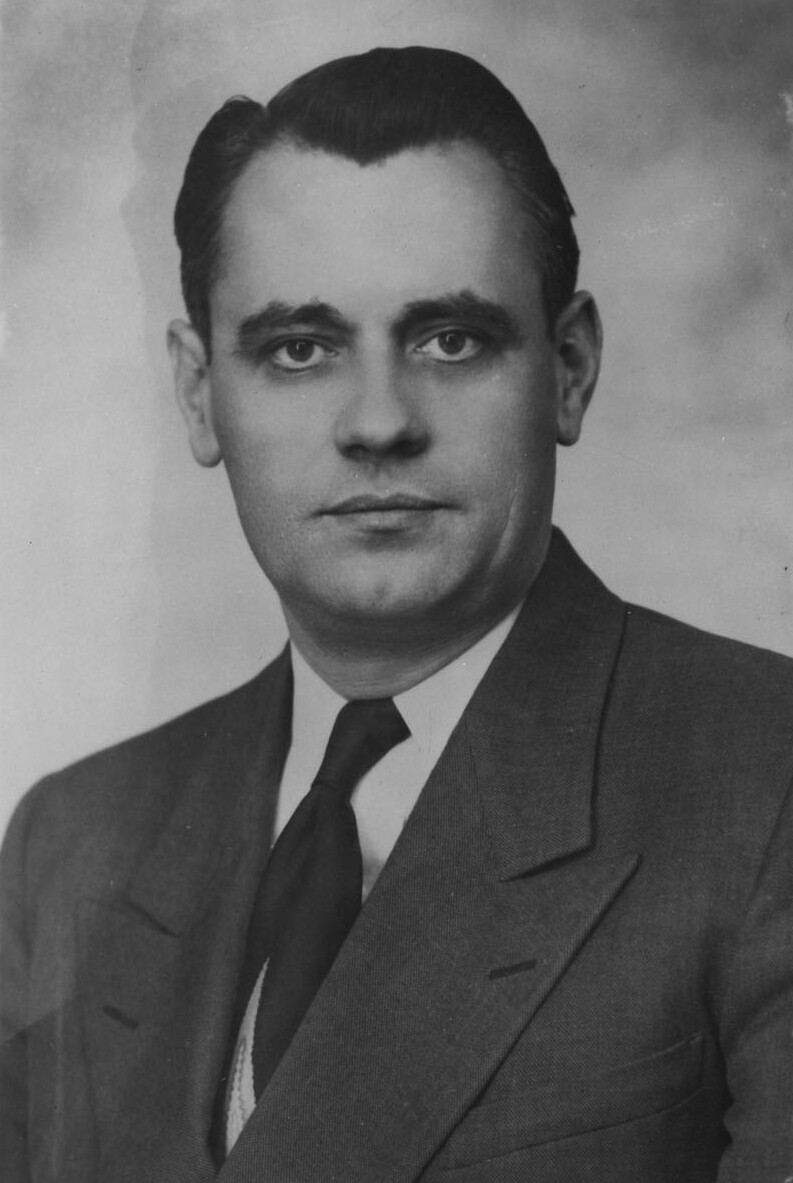
- Starr, c. 1940s

Leader of the Opposition
- In office September 9, 1967 – November 5, 1967
- Preceded by: John Diefenbaker
- Succeeded by: Robert Stanfield

Member of Parliament for Ontario
- In office May 26, 1952 – June 25, 1968
- Preceded by: Walter Thomson
- Succeeded by: Norman Cafik

Personal details
- Born: Michael Starchewsky; November 15, 1910 Copper Cliff, Ontario, Canada
- Died: March 16, 2000 (aged 89) Oshawa, Ontario, Canada
- Party: Progressive Conservative
- Spouse: Anne Zaritsky
- Profession: Judge

Michael Starr, PC (born Michael Starchewsky; November 15, 1910 – March 16, 2000) was a Canadian politician and the first Canadian cabinet minister of Ukrainian descent, his parents having emigrated from Halychyna (Galicia), then a part of the Austro-Hungarian Empire and is now Western Ukraine.

== Life and career ==
Born in Copper Cliff, Ontario, Starr was an alderman for the Oshawa City Council from 1944 to 1949. From 1949 to 1952, he was the mayor of Oshawa. In 1951, he ran unsuccessfully as a candidate for the Legislative Assembly of Ontario.

First elected to the House of Commons in 1952 as a Progressive Conservative, Starr was re-elected six times until he was narrowly defeated in the 1968 election by future New Democratic Party (NDP) leader Ed Broadbent. Starr served as Minister of Labour in the government of John Diefenbaker from 1957 to 1963, and served as Opposition House Leader from 1965 to 1968.

In 1967, Starr stood as a candidate at the PC leadership convention, but was eliminated on the second ballot.

When Robert Stanfield became leader of the Progressive Conservative Party in 1967, Starr became Leader of the Opposition for two months until Stanfield won a seat in the House through a by-election. He lost his seat by fifteen votes in 1968 to Ed Broadbent, failing to retake it in 1972.

From 1968 to 1972, he was a citizenship court judge in Toronto. Starr was appointed chairman of the Workers' Compensation Board of Ontario in 1973, and served in that position until 1980.

In 1979, Starr was appointed Honorary Colonel of The Ontario Regiment (RCAC), a reserve armoured regiment based in Oshawa, Ontario. He held this appointment until 1983.

He was invested into The Most Venerable Order of the Hospital of Saint John of Jerusalem, (Order of St. John to use its short title) as an Officer and subsequently promoted to the grade of Commander. He was awarded the Queen Elizabeth II Coronation Medal, Canadian Centennial Medal, and the Queen Elizabeth II Silver Jubilee Medal.

In 1983, an Ontario government building was named in Starr's honour. The Michael J. Starr building at 33 King St W in Oshawa is seven floors, each floor with an acre of working space.

Starr is remembered for his work in furthering the cause of ethnic groups and minorities. He helped to build the policy of old age pensions for the Progressive Conservatives. He worked to make the national employment service more humane in its approach to the unemployed and, in his tenure as minister, extended unemployment insurance benefits to women and seasonal workers, and extended federal financial assistance to the provinces under the vocational training coordination act.

Starr died in Oshawa on March 16, 2000, at the age of 89; he was predeceased by his wife Anne Zaritsky, whom he married in 1933, and his son, Dr. Robert Starr. His daughter, Joan Nicol, survived him.
