= Leonard Burnett =

England-born Canadian politician

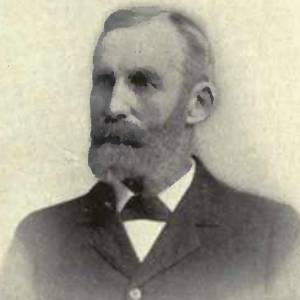

Member of the Canadian Parliament for Ontario South
- In office 1896–1900
- Preceded by: William Smith
- Succeeded by: William Ross

Personal details
- Born: April 5, 1845 Yorkshire, England
- Died: August 21, 1932 (aged 87) Toronto, Ontario, Canada
- Party: Liberal
- Occupation: Farmer, teacher

Leonard Burnett (April 5, 1845 in Yorkshire, England - August 21, 1932) was a politician, farmer and teacher. He was elected to the House of Commons of Canada in the 1896 election as a Member of the Liberal Party in the 1896 election to represent the riding of Ontario South.

The son of Thomas Burnett and Hannah Dickenson, he moved to Canada in 1846, was educated in Greenwood, Ontario and Whitby and settled in Greenbank. Burnett taught school for three years.

Prior to his federal political experience, he was councillor for Ontario County (1871-1873) then Deputy Reeve for Reach Township, Ontario (1891) then reeve (1892-1893).

In 1870, he married Sarah Jane Dryden. Burnett died in Toronto at the age of 87.

== Electoral record ==
1896 Canadian federal election: South riding of Ontario
Party	Candidate	Votes
Liberal	Leonard Burnett	2,165
Conservative	William Smith	2,021
