= Thomas Fennell (politician) =

Canadian politician

Thomas Scott Fennell

Member of Parliament for Ontario
- In office 1979–1988
- Preceded by: Norman Cafik
- Succeeded by: René Soetens

Personal details
- Born: 9 January 1928 Toronto, Ontario, Canada
- Died: 27 January 2012 (aged 84) Toronto.
- Party: Progressive Conservative
- Profession: Insurance

Thomas Scott Fennell (9 January 1928 – 27 January 2012) was a Progressive Conservative party member of the House of Commons of Canada. He was an insurance executive and businessman by career.

He was elected to the Ontario in 1979 and re-elected there in the 1980 and 1984 elections. Fennell left national politics in 1988 and did not run in that year's election, having served in the 31st, 32nd and 33rd Canadian Parliaments. According to his obituary in the Globe and Mail (January 30, 2012, pp S6), he was the Chief Government Whip in the latter term.
