= Strengthening Canadian Citizenship Act =

Canadian Parliament legislation

Parliament of Canada
- Long title: An Act to amend the Citizenship Act and to make consequential amendments to other Acts
- Citation: SC 2014, c. 22
- Passed by: House of Commons
- Passed: 16 June 2014
- Passed by: Senate
- Passed: 19 June 2014
- Royal assent: 19 June 2014

Legislative history

Initiating chamber: House of Commons
- Bill title: Bill C-24, 41st Parliament, 2nd session
- Introduced by: Chris Alexander
- First reading: 6 February 2014
- Second reading: 29 May 2014
- Considered in committee: 4 June 2014
- Third reading: 16 June 2014

Revising chamber: Senate
- First reading: 16 June 2014
- Second reading: 17 June 2014
- Considered in committee: 18 June 2014
- Third reading: 19 June 2014

The Strengthening Canadian Citizenship Act (French: Loi renforçant la citoyenneté canadienne, SCCA) is legislation passed by the 40th Canadian Parliament in 2014, under the direction of Minister of Immigration Chris Alexander. The Act allowed the immigration minister to revoke Canadian citizenship from dual citizens for certain cases such as fraud, treason, espionage, and terrorism.

== Content ==
The Act tightened the requirements for applying for Canadian citizenship by increasing the required length of physical presence in Canada by the applicant. Canadian citizens who are dual citizens can have their citizenship revoked for fraud in obtaining citizenship, engaging in armed conflict against Canada, or being convicted of treason, espionage, or terrorism with significant prison sentences, by a citizenship and immigration minister instead of a judge.

== History ==
Bill C-24 was presented by Alexander in February 2014, and received Royal Assent on 19 June 2014. The Canadian Bar Association wrote a report on the bill. The Globe and Mail wrote that Alexander was "under fire" as the bill was set to pass.

Zakaria Amara was stripped of his citizenship under the Act on 26 September 2015. However, on 19 June 2017, Amara's Canadian citizenship was automatically restored following the passage of Bill C-6 of the 42nd Parliament of Canada, which had been introduced by John McCallum and had the effect of deleting several of the SCCA's provisions most notably the terrorist grounds for revocation.

The Act became a contentious topic during the 2015 Canadian federal election. Incumbent Prime Minister Stephen Harper stood on his record while Justin Trudeau and Tom Mulcair both said they would reverse the revocation clause.

== Reception ==
The bill had elicited much controversy. Experts told the Toronto Star in June that the bill was "discriminatory" and "weakens citizenship". Academic Wesley Wark criticized the bill, saying "[it] is too much power in the hands of a minister."
