= Dan McTeague =

Canadian politician and businessman

The Honourable Daniel P. McTeague PC

Member of Parliament for Pickering—Scarborough East (Pickering—Ajax—Uxbridge; 1997–2004) (Ontario; 1993–1997)
- In office October 25, 1993 – May 2, 2011
- Preceded by: René Soetens
- Succeeded by: Corneliu Chisu

Personal details
- Born: October 16, 1962 (age 64) Winnipeg, Manitoba
- Party: Liberal (former)
- Spouse: Daniela Rossi
- Children: 5
- Profession: Policy advisor, Public relations advisor

Daniel P. McTeague, PC (born October 16, 1962) is a Canadian businessman and former politician. McTeague served for eighteen years as Member of Parliament for the Ontario riding of Pickering—Scarborough East.

== Early life ==
Fluently bilingual, McTeague graduated from the University of Toronto and worked as an intern in Ottawa to Paul Cosgrove, then Minister of Public Works and Canada Mortgage and Housing and later with the Royal Bank. After graduation he worked as an assistant to Alvin Curling, Ontario Minister of Housing. From 1989 to 1993, he worked as a public relations specialist with Toyota Canada.

== Political career (1993–2011) ==
McTeague was first elected to Parliament in the 1993 federal election and was re-elected in 1997, 2000, 2004, 2006 and 2008. He was a member of the Liberal Party of Canada and was the Parliamentary Secretary to the Minister of Foreign Affairs tasked with protecting Canadians abroad, until the Liberals lost the 2006 election. He served as the vice-chair of the Standing Committee on Industry.

McTeague helped free William Sampson from prison in Saudi Arabia by obtaining a letter of forgiveness from Justin Rodway, the eldest son of the victim of Sampson's alleged crime. McTeague also aided in securing the release of other Canadians from detention abroad, including Abdullah Al-Malki, Muyadad Nureddin and Al-Matti.

His earlier legislative achievements included a bill passing into law the recognition of the third week in April as the Annual Donor Organ Week and setting Parliamentary precedent as the first backbench MP to successfully amend the Criminal Code and see his bill making fleeing a peace officer using a vehicle unlawful. So rare was this feat, that upon passing of third reading in the Senate, his Bill, C-202, was promulgated into law before one judge on the Supreme Court of Canada, without the normal requirement of waiting the several months of publication in the Canada Gazette. His Act, now section 249.1 of the Criminal Code of Canada, took effect on February 7, 2000.

In 2001, he criticized Canada's restrictive drug patent laws and pushed the Chrétien government from within to relax those laws to help address the African AIDS pandemic.

On November 22, 2005, McTeague asked Immigration Minister Joe Volpe to restrict rapper 50 Cent from entering Canada, citing the death of a constituent at the performer's previous concert in Toronto in 2004. 50 Cent's tour went on as scheduled but McTeague's intervention succeeded in seeing at least half of the accompanying members of the rapper's troupe, the G-Unit, banned in Canada as a result of the objections.

With Canadian troops facing casualties in Afghanistan, McTeague criticized the government practice of docking injured soldier's "operational pay" once out of theatre. In May 2007, he supported the Dinnings family in their public dispute with the federal Conservative government, which led to an increase of the funeral stipend to families of fallen Canadian soldiers.

=== Registered Education Savings Plan ===
McTeague tabled a private member bill that proposed to give parents substantial tax breaks for saving education money; taxpayers who deposited $5,000 into a Registered Education Savings Plan (RESP) for their children's post-secondary education would earn a $5,000 tax deduction, similar to the deduction allowed for contributions to a Registered Retirement Savings Plan (RRSP). Under the Tax-Free Savings Account (TFSA), introduced in Finance Minister Jim Flaherty's 2008 budget, there was no deduction for annual contributions. The benefit to TFSAs is withdrawals can be done at any time, for any reason, with no tax consequences. Withdrawals from RRSPs are taxed and there are restrictions on annual withdrawals from RESPs.

Ted Menzies, Conservative Parliamentary Secretary to the Minister of Finance, lashed out at the proposal and suggested McTeague explain how the government would pay for his proposal, while Garth Turner strongly supported McTeague's bill and called it "the greatest financial tool in a generation." The Green Party said the government should have ceased threats to trigger an election over the RESP private member’s bill. McTeague's bill passed through the House of Commons of Canada on March 5, 2008, after Speaker of the House, Liberal Peter Milliken, ruled the bill in order as it did not require a royal recommendation, given that it did not contemplate spending money, only reducing revenue. Flaherty introduced a ways and means motion which nullified McTeague's bill.

=== Rising energy costs ===
From January 2015 to June 2019, McTeague was a gas price analyst at GasBuddy.com. Since then, he has continued to publish his views on that topic on Twitter.

=== Support for the abolition of usage based billing ===
McTeague, along with Jack Layton of the NDP, on February 4, 2011 attended a rally in Toronto organized by Calvin Tennant against an internet usage based billing decision by the Canadian Radio-television and Telecommunications Commission (CRTC). He vowed to fight to reverse the CRTC decision, calling it the "Giga-Tax".

=== Order of Canada criticism ===
McTeague criticized the induction into the Order of Canada of Dr. Henry Morgentaler, saying that the Advisory Council of the Order of Canada strayed into social comment with its "provocative" choice, and argued that it was not the mandate of the ten-person panel.

== After politics ==
In 2019, he became President of Canadians for Affordable Energy after the group's founder John Williamson returned to Parliament.

=== Criticism of the Liberal Party ===
Despite being a member of the Liberal Party for the entirety of his tenure as an MP, McTeague has been vocal in his criticism of the party under the leadership of Justin Trudeau. In a 2024 interview with NowMedia, McTeague argued the Liberals were no longer a centrist party, and said that he had left the party. McTeague also criticized the Liberals' implementation of the carbon tax, spending policies during the COVID-19 pandemic, and natural resource policies.
