= Francis Wayland Glen =

Canadian politician

Francis Wayland Glen (September 5, 1836 – May 5, 1912) was a manufacturer and political figure in Ontario, Canada. He represented Ontario South in the House of Commons of Canada from 1878 to 1887 as a Liberal member.

He was born in Minaville, New York, the son of Elijah McKinney Glen, of Scottish descent, and was educated in Rochester. Glen married Harriet Frances Hall in Rochester. He managed the Hall Works in Oshawa, which had been established by his father-in-law, Joseph Hall, and which produced iron implements. After the failure of the business, Glen returned to New York and died there at the age of 75.

== Electoral record ==
1878 Canadian federal election: South riding of Ontario
| Party | Candidate | Votes |
|---|---|---|
| Liberal | Francis Wayland Glen | 1,867 |
| Liberal-Conservative | Thomas Nicholson Gibbs | 1,661 |
Source: Canadian Elections Database

1882 Canadian federal election: South riding of Ontario
| Party | Candidate | Votes |
|---|---|---|
| Liberal | Francis Wayland Glen | 1,668 |
| Conservative | William Smith | 1,618 |
