= William Ross (Ontario politician) =

Ontario politician

William Ross (July 14, 1854 – January 22, 1937) was a merchant and political figure in Ontario, Canada. He represented Ontario South in the House of Commons of Canada from 1900 to 1904 as a Liberal.

He was born in Prince Albert, Canada West, the son of Aaron Ross and Lucinda Fitchett, and was educated in Port Perry and at the British American Commercial College in Toronto. Ross was a grain dealer and operated a general store. In 1877, he married Clara J. Bingham. Ross served on the village council for Port Perry and was reeve for two years. He also served as chairman of the school board. Ross ran unsuccessfully for reelection to the House of Commons in 1904.

== Electoral record ==
1900 Canadian federal election: South riding of Ontario
| Party | Candidate | Votes |
|---|---|---|
| Liberal | William Ross | 1,970 |
| Conservative | William Smith | 1,876 |

1904 Canadian federal election: South riding of Ontario
| Party | Candidate | Votes |
|---|---|---|
| Conservative | Peter Christie | 2,544 |
| Liberal | William Ross | 2,439 |
