= René Soetens =

Canadian politician

Member of Parliament for Ontario
- In office 1988–1993
- Preceded by: Tom Fennell
- Succeeded by: Dan McTeague

Personal details
- Born: 7 September 1948 (age 77) Eindhoven, Netherlands
- Party: Progressive Conservative
- Profession: Businessman

René John Soetens (born 7 September 1948) was a member of the House of Commons of Canada from 1988 to 1993. His background was in business and sales.

Rene was elected to Town of Ajax Council in 1980 and re-elected 1982 and 1985. He was elected in the 1988 federal election at the Ontario for the Progressive Conservative party. He served in the 34th Canadian Parliament but lost to Dan McTeague of the Liberal Party in the 1993 federal election.

Soetens also made an unsuccessful bid to return to national Parliament in the 2004 federal election at the Ajax—Pickering electoral district. He is president and owner of Con-Test, a national certification company specializing in the testing of controlled environments found in research facilities, hospitals, pharmaceutical drug manufacturing and associated cleanrooms.
