= Thomas Erlin Kaiser =

Canadian politician

Member of Parliament for Ontario
- In office October 1925 – July 1930
- Preceded by: Position established
- Succeeded by: William Henry Moore

Personal details
- Born: Thomas Erlin Kaiser; 16 February 1863 Edgely, York County, Canada West
- Died: 29 February 1940 (aged 77)
- Party: Conservative
- Spouse(s): Louise Lister m. 26 December 1896
- Profession: author, physician

Thomas Erlin Kaiser (16 February 1863 – 29 February 1940) was a Conservative member of the House of Commons of Canada. He was born in Edgely, York County, Canada West and became an author and physician.

Kaiser attended Weston High School then the University of Toronto where in 1890 he attained his Doctor of Medicine degree. He served on municipal boards in areas such as libraries, education, planning and water. In 1912, he became a member of the Ontario Board of Health. In 1916, Kaiser was made an honorary major of the Canadian Militia.

In 1907 and 1908, Kaiser was mayor of Oshawa. As an author, his books include Historic sketches of Oshawa (1921) and A history of the medical profession of the county of Ontario (1934).

He was first elected to Parliament at the Ontario riding in the 1925 general election then re-elected there in 1926. Kaiser was defeated by William Henry Moore of the Liberals in the 1930 election.
