= List of people from Oshawa =

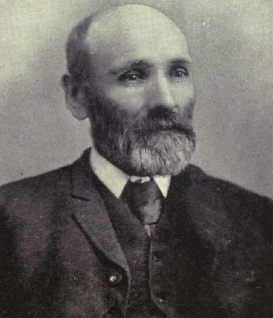
Robert McLaughlin

This list of people from Oshawa tracks those with biographies on Wikipedia.

== A ==
- Philip Akin, actor
- Sean Avery, NHL hockey player

== B ==
- Aaron Badgley, music journalist and radio host
- Sherwood Bassin, general manager in the Ontario Hockey League
- Wren Blair, hockey player, and NHL coach and General Manager
- Ed Broadbent, politician
- Arnie Brown, NHL player
- Sean Brown, NHL player
- Kat Burns, musician

== C ==
- Antonio Carvalho, UFC fighter
- Daniel Caesar, singer-songwriter
- Lloyd Chadburn, Canadian World War II fighter pilot
- Stefan Charles, NFL player
- A. J. Cook, actress

== D ==
- Mitch de Snoo, professional lacrosse player

== E ==
- Dennis Edmonton, songwriter Born to be Wild
- Jerry Edmonton, member of Steppenwolf
- Michael Elgin, professional wrestler
- Shirley Eikhard, songwriter Something to Talk About
- Evangeline Lydia Emsley, nurse in World War I

== F ==
- John H. Foote, film critic
- Elijah Fisher, basketball player

== H ==
- John Hanson, actor and singer
- Shalom Harlow, Canadian supermodel and actress
- Dale Hawerchuk, NHL hockey player
- Sandy Hawley, horse jockey
- Harry Hess, singer in rock group Harem Scarem.
- Matthew Hughes, Olympian in the 3000m steeplechase at the 2016 Summer Olympics
- Kathryn Humphreys, sports anchor

== J ==
- Donald Jackson, figure skater who won the bronze at the 1960 Olympics

== K ==
- Greg Kean, actor
- Derek Keenan, former lacrosse player, and current head coach and General Manager of the Edmonton Rush of the National Lacrosse League

== L ==
- Matt Leyden, manager of Oshawa Generals and Ontario Hockey Association president
- Paul Lowman, musician
- Alexandra Luke, artist
- John MacLean, NHL player

== M ==
- Kevin McClelland, NHL player
- John J. McLaughlin, son of Robert McLaughlin and inventor of Canada Dry Pale Ginger Ale
- Robert McLaughlin, founder of the McLaughlin Motor Car Company, which became a major part of General Motors Canada.
- Kate Moyer, actress
- Samantha Munro, actress

== N ==
- James Neal, NHL hockey player for the Edmonton Oilers
- Andrew Nicholls, musician, writer, and producer

== O ==
- John O'Regan, musician

== P ==
- John Part, three time World Darts Champion
- Wayne Petti, musician
- Stephen Poloz, Governor of the Bank of Canada

== R ==
- Darrin Rose, comedian
- Scott Russell, television sportscaster
- Paul Romanuk, television sportscaster Paul Romanuk

== S ==
- Bill Siksay, politician and queer activist
- Lennon Stella, actress and musician
- Maisy Stella, actress and musician

== T ==
- Janice Tanton, contemporary Canadian artist, and cousin to jockey Sandy Hawley (above)
- Jeff Teravainen, actor
- Shawn Thornton, NHL player
- Albert W. Tucker, mathematician

== U ==
- Barbara Underhill, figure skater

== V ==
- Darrell Vickers, musician, writer, and producer
- Angela Vint, actress
- Sacha Visagie, singer

== W ==
- Tom Walmsley, writer
- Tonya Lee Williams, actress
- Jonathan Wilson, actor, comedian and playwright
- Nigel Wilson, major league baseball player

== Y ==
- Lori Yates, country singer and songwriter

== Musical groups ==
- Cuff the Duke, indie-rock band
- Dizzy, Juno Award-winning Indie pop band.
- Lennon & Maisy, country music duo, songwriters and actresses. Star as Maddie & Daphne Conrad on the ABC musical drama series Nashville
- The Stellas, country music duo and songwriters
- Wednesday, recording artists Paul Andrew Smith, Mike O'Neil, Randy Begg, John Dufek
