= Thomas Devitt =

Thomas Devitt may refer to:

- Thomas Devitt of Devitt and Moore
- Sir Thomas Devitt, 1st Baronet (1839–1923), of the Devitt baronets
- Sir Thomas Devitt, 2nd Baronet (1902–1995), English rugby union player

== See also ==
- Devitt (surname)
