= Devitt =

- Language: Irish

Origin
- Meaning: Son of David
- Region of origin: Ireland

Other names
- Variant form: Davies (potentially)

Devitt is a patronymic surname of Irish origin.

== Overview ==
"Devitt" may be related to the Welsh surname "Davies" as both are Celtic surnames that are generally accepted to mean "son of David", as well as "Davies" potentially stemming from the name of the Irish Déisi dynasty who settled in Wales and western England during the Early Middle Ages, though no theory has been definitively proven for either name.

== Notable people with the surname ==
- Amy. J Devitt (born 1955), American academic
- Don Devitt (1921–2008), Australian politician
- Edward Devitt (1911–1992), U.S. Representative and District Judge
- Edward I. Devitt (1840–1920), Canadian-American priest
- Fergal Devitt (born 1981), Irish professional wrestler better known as Finn Bálor
- James Devitt (politician) (1929–1989), American politician
- Jamie Devitt (born 1990), Irish footballer
- John Devitt (born 1937), Australian swimmer and Olympic gold medalist
- John Henry Devitt (1851–1940), Canadian politician
- John R. Devitt (1917–2000), American politician
- Michael Devitt (born 1938), Australian philosopher

== Other uses ==
- Devitt baronets (1839–1947), a British baronetcy created for people with the surname
- Devitt and Moore (1836–1891), a British shipping company formed by Thomas Henry Devitt and Joseph Moore
