= Samuel McLaughlin =

Canadian businessman and philanthropist (1871–1972)

R. Samuel McLaughlin CC ED CD
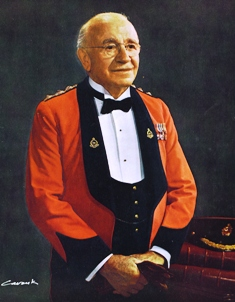
- McLaughlin in the mess uniform of The Ontario Regiment, c. 1960
- Born: Robert Samuel McLaughlin; September 8, 1871; Enniskillen, Ontario, Canada
- Died: January 6, 1972 (aged 100); Oshawa, Ontario, Canada
- Occupations: Businessman, philanthropist
- Spouse: Adelaide Louise Mowbray (1875-1958)
- Children: 5 daughters, including Isabel
- Awards: Order of Canada

Colonel Robert Samuel McLaughlin, CC ED CD (September 8, 1871 – January 6, 1972) was a Canadian businessman and philanthropist. He started the McLaughlin Motor Car Company in 1907, one of the first major automobile manufacturers in Canada, which evolved into General Motors of Canada. McLaughlin lived to the age of 100.

== Life and career ==
McLaughlin was born near Bowmanville in the hamlet of Enniskillen, Ontario, the son of Robert McLaughlin and Mary Smith. As a young man, he worked for a short time in a local hardware store, then in 1887 became an apprentice in the upholstery shop of his father's company, McLaughlin Carriage Works, which had opened in 1867. At one time, it was promoted as the largest manufacturer of horse-drawn buggies and sleighs in the British Empire. In 1890, McLaughlin took a job at H. H. Babcock, an upholstery company in Watertown, New York.

In 1892, McLaughlin and his brother George become junior partners in their father's company. In 1898, he married Adelaide Mowbray.

The McLaughlin Motor Car Company was incorporated on November 20, 1907. With engines from William C. Durant of Buick, the company produced the McLaughlin-Buick Model F. In 1908, its first full year of operation, 154 cars were assembled. In 1910, McLaughlin became a director of General Motors. He sold his Chevrolet company stock in 1918 and became president of General Motors of Canada, which continued to sell cars under the McLaughlin-Buick brand until 1942.

He retired in 1945, but remained chairman of the board until his death in 1972. He continued to serve on the board of General Motors until the early 1960s, and was coincidentally replaced by Royal Bank of Canada president Earle McLaughlin, his first cousin once removed.

His older brother, chemist John J. McLaughlin (1865–1914), founded the Canada Dry company. After his brother's death in 1914, McLaughlin became president of this company briefly until it was sold around 1923.

His mansion, Parkwood Estate, begun in 1916, was designed by the Toronto architectural firm of Darling and Pearson. In 1989, the Parkwood estate was officially designated a National Historic Site by the federal government, on the recommendation of the national Historic Sites and Monuments Board.

== Honours and awards ==
McLaughlin was appointed as honorary lieutenant-colonel of the 34th Ontario Regiment in 1921. He held this position until 1931, at which time he was appointed as honorary colonel of the same unit, later designated as The Ontario Regiment (RCAC), a reserve armoured regiment based in Oshawa. Affectionately known as "Colonel Sam", McLaughlin served as honorary colonel until 1967, thereby becoming the longest continuously-serving colonel in the history of the Canadian Forces.

In 1967, McLaughlin was appointed a Companion of the Order of Canada.

== Philanthropy ==
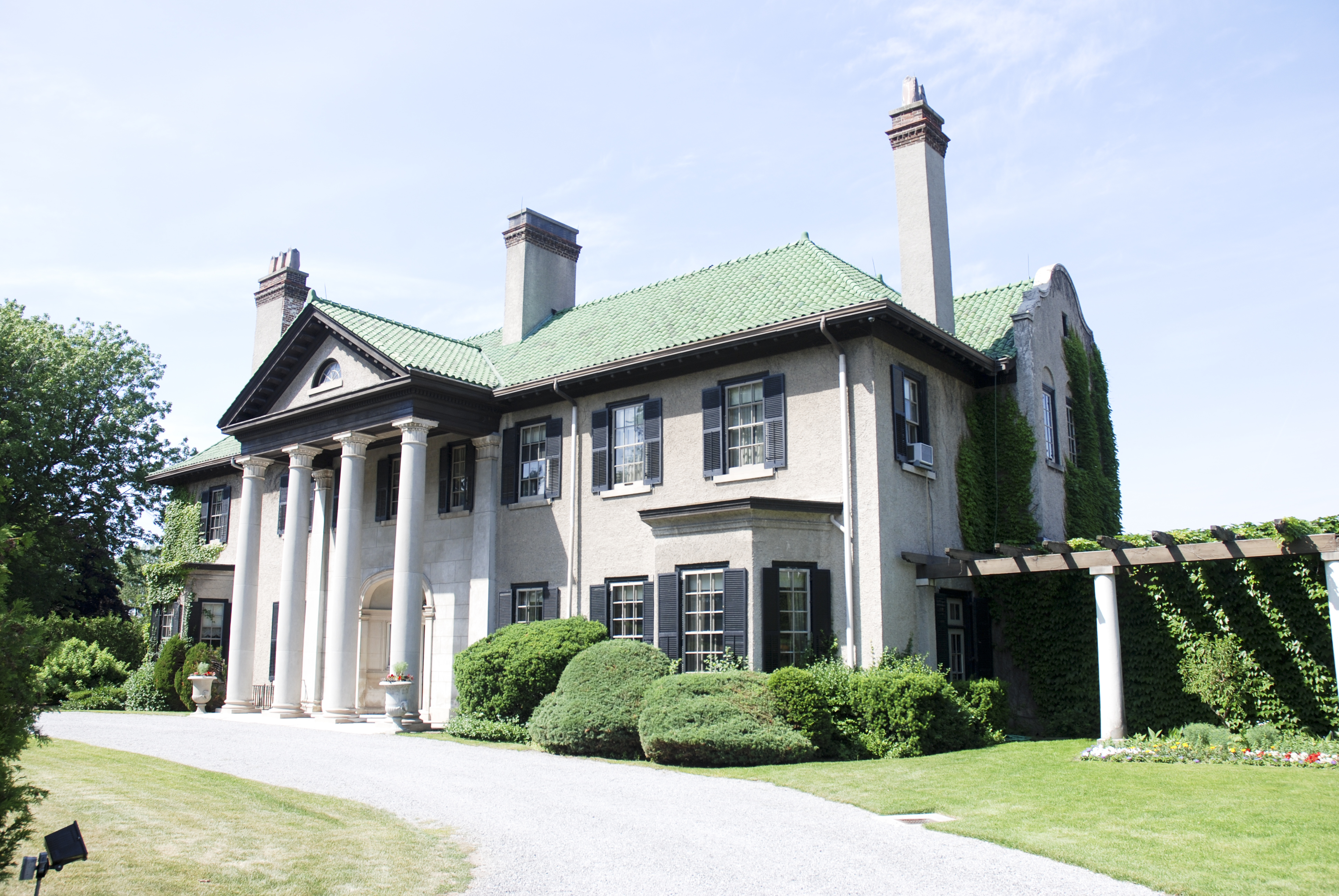
Parkwood Estate in 2007

In 1951, he established the McLaughlin Foundation which, from 1953 to 2003, donated nearly $200 million to the University of Toronto and other causes, including the McLaughlin Planetarium at the Royal Ontario Museum.

McLaughlin was a major contributor to Queen's University at Kingston, Ontario. The university's Mechanical Engineering Department is housed in McLaughlin Hall, which was his donation in 1948. McLaughlin Hall in Queen's University's John Deutsch University Centre is also named for him. His wife, Adelaide McLaughlin, was honoured in 1957 by Queen's, which named the women's residence Adelaide Hall for her.

In 1947 McLaughlin and his wife donated land for a Boy Scout camp on the outskirts of Oshawa. The camp was named "Camp Samac".

McLaughlin donated $1 million to the 1968 library building at the University of Guelph, which bears his name.

He provided partial funding to build a college at York University in Toronto. Opened in 1968, it was named McLaughlin College in his honour.

McLaughlin Hall at St. Andrew's College in Aurora, Ontario, which McLaughlin unveiled in 1971 at age 99, is named after him in recognition of his contributions to the school. He endowed the Regimental Foundation of The Ontario Regiment (RCAC) and quietly paid the salaries of some of the regiment's soldiers during times of severely curtailed government funding. McLaughlin House at the Lester B. Pearson United World College of the Pacific also bears his name.

He gave generously to the art community. Among other gifts, he gave Lawren Harris`s Pic Island, Arthur Lismer`s Bright Land, and Emily Carr`s Old Tree at Dusk to the McMichael Canadian Art Collection in Kleinburg.

== Thoroughbred horse racing ==
In his youth, McLaughlin competed in cycling and yachting, and he was an equestrian show jumping champion at competitions in Canada and the United States. His love of horses led to the establishment of Parkwood Stable, a thoroughbred horse racing and breeding farm located a few miles north of Oshawa, Ontario.

McLaughlin's horses won numerous races in Canada and in the U.S.; his horses won important races including the 1942 Peter Pan Stakes at Belmont Park. A three-time winner of Canada's most prestigious race, the Queen's Plate, in 1934 his future Hall of Fame colt Horometer won both the Queen's Plate and the Breeders' Stakes. In 1950, the nearly eighty-year-old McLaughlin retired from racing, selling his Parkwood Stable to E. P. Taylor, under whom it would become known as Windfields Farm.

A long-time director of the Ontario Jockey Club, McLaughlin was inducted into Canada's Sports Hall of Fame in 1963 and the Canadian Horse Racing Hall of Fame in 1977.

== See also ==
- R S McLaughlin Collegiate and Vocational Institute, named after McLaughlin
