= William Henry Reid =

Canadian politician and farmer

Ontario MPP
- In office 1894–1902
- Preceded by: William Thomas Lockhart
- Succeeded by: William Rickard
- Constituency: Durham West

Personal details
- Born: 1846 Clarke Township, Canada West
- Died: 1912 (aged 65–66)
- Party: PPA-Conservative
- Spouse: Margaret Mulligan
- Occupation: Farmer

William Henry Reid (1846–1912) was an Ontario farmer and political figure. He represented Durham West in the Legislative Assembly of Ontario from 1894 to 1898 as a Conservative-Protestant Protective Association member and then from 1898 to 1902 as a Conservative member.

== Biography ==
He was born in Clarke Township, the son of William Reid, an immigrant from Ireland. He was educated in Clarke and Newcastle. Reid served as a member of the township council for Clarke from 1889 to 1894. He married Margaret Mulligan. Reid later served as governor for Cobourg jail.

His son Albert ("Bert") went on to serve as reeve for Clarke Township and warden for the United Counties of Northumberland and Durham.
