= William Rickard (politician) =

Canadian politician from Ontario

Member of the Ontario Provincial Parliament for Durham West
- In office May 29, 1902 – December 13, 1904
- Preceded by: William Henry Reid
- Succeeded by: John Henry Devitt

Personal details
- Party: Liberal

William Rickard was a Canadian politician from Ontario. He represented Durham West in the Legislative Assembly of Ontario from 1902 to 1904.

== See also ==
- 10th Parliament of Ontario
