= Protestant Protective Association =

1890s anti-Catholic group in Canada

The Protestant Protective Association was an anti-Catholic group in the 1890s based in Ontario, Canada, associated with the Orange Order. Originally a spinoff of the American group the American Protective Association, it became independent in 1892. The PPA denounced the role of Catholics and French-Canadians in politics, and warned Protestants that Catholics were attempting to take over Ontario. It aimed to eliminate French language education in schools in Ontario and western Canada (particularly Manitoba), and to roll back or block Catholic school systems in those provinces.

== Ontario ==
The party began to achieve success with the surprise victory of Peter Duncan McCallum in the 1893 provincial by-election in Lambton East. By 1894, members of the PPA were elected to serve as the mayors of Brantford, London, Hamilton, Chatham, Kincardine, and Petrolia, Ontario.

In the 1894 provincial election, the party succeeded in winning nine seats in the Legislative Assembly of Ontario. These members worked closely with the opposition Ontario Conservative Party.

No PPA candidates ran in the 1898 Ontario election, or in any subsequent Ontario election. William Henry Reid of the Durham West riding was the only PPA MPP to return to the 1898 provincial legislature; however, in 1898, he ran and was elected as a member of the Conservative Party.

Many had spoken out against the PPA’s goal of exclusion of Roman Catholics from political power when it had been issue in Britain. Such statements including those by Lord Palmerston and Earl Grey, who said the PPA’s goal of exclusion of Roman Catholics from political power was an abridgement of Catholics’ freedom and civil rights, were quoted in a Canadian anti-PPA publication published in 1895.

== Federal ==
The PPA ran several candidates in Ontario for the 1896 federal election as a protest against the Conservative Party's conflicted position on the Manitoba Schools Question. The PPA failed to win any seats in the House of Commons of Canada, but was instrumental in defeating Conservative candidates in four of the five ridings in which it nominated candidates.

== See also ==
- American Protective Association
- Anti-Catholicism
- List of Ontario general elections
- List of political parties in Canada
