= John McLeod (Ontario politician) =

Ontario politician and businessman

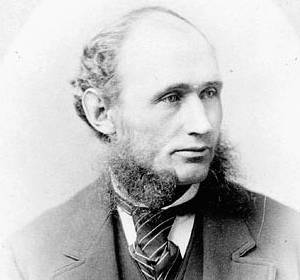

Ontario MPP
- In office 1871–1879
- Preceded by: Edward Blake
- Succeeded by: James Wellington McLaughlin
- In office 1867–1871
- Preceded by: Riding established
- Succeeded by: Edward Blake
- Constituency: Durham West

Personal details
- Born: September 20, 1833 Lancaster Township, Glengarry County, Upper Canada
- Died: March 9, 1879 (aged 45) Bowmanville, Ontario
- Party: Liberal
- Occupation: Businessman

John McLeod (September 20, 1833 – March 9, 1879) was an Ontario businessman and political figure. He represented Durham West in the Legislative Assembly of Ontario as a Liberal member from 1867 to 1871 and from 1872 to 1879.

== Biography ==
He was born in Lancaster Township in Upper Canada in 1833, the son of Scottish immigrants, and grew up there, later settling in Bowmanville. He served as warden for the United Counties of Northumberland and Durham. He was a director of the Bowmanville Furniture Manufacturing Company. He was reelected in 1872 by acclamation after Edward Blake resigned to retain his seat in the Canadian House of Commons. He died on March 9, 1879, at Bowmanville.

== Electoral history ==
1867 Ontario general election: Durham West
| Party | Candidate | Votes | % |
|---|---|---|---|
| Liberal | John McLeod | 1,473 | 68.80 |
| Conservative | W. Martin | 668 | 31.20 |
| Total valid votes | | 2,141 | 77.43 |
| Eligible voters | | 2,765 | |
| Liberal pickup new district. | | | |
Source: Elections Ontario

Ontario provincial by-election, January 1872: Durham West Resignation of Edward Blake
| Party | Candidate | Votes |
|---|---|---|
| Liberal | John McLeod | Acclaimed |
Source: History of the Electoral Districts, Legislatures and Ministries of the Province of Ontario

1875 Ontario general election: Durham West
| Party | Candidate | Votes | % |
|---|---|---|---|
| Liberal | John McLeod | 1,257 | 53.95 |
| Conservative | J. McClung | 1,073 | 46.05 |
| Turnout | | 2,330 | 71.52 |
| Eligible voters | | 3,258 | |
| Liberal hold | | | |
Source: Elections Ontario
