= James Wellington McLaughlin =

Canadian politician and doctor

Ontario MPP
- In office 1879–1890
- Preceded by: John McLeod
- Succeeded by: William Thomas Lockhart
- Constituency: Durham West

Personal details
- Born: August 24, 1840 Cavan Township, Durham County, Upper Canada
- Died: August 9, 1903 (aged 62)
- Party: Liberal
- Spouse: Ella Gross (m. 1866)
- Relations: Robert McLaughlin, brother
- Occupation: Doctor

James Wellington McLaughlin (August 24, 1840 – August 9, 1903) was an Ontario medical doctor and political figure. He represented Durham West in the Legislative Assembly of Ontario as a Liberal from 1879 to 1890.

He was born in Cavan Township, Durham County, Upper Canada in 1840, the son of John McLaughlin, who came from Ireland. The family later settled in Darlington Township. McLaughlin studied at the University of Toronto and the University of Edinburgh. He set up practice in Bowmanville. In 1866, he married Ida Ella Gross. McLaughlin was examiner for the University of Toronto and for the Medical Council of Ontario.

His older brother, Robert was a businessman who was involved first in manufacturing carriages and later automobiles.

== Electoral history ==
1879 Ontario general election: Durham West
Party	Candidate	Votes	%	±%
Liberal	James Wellington McLaughlin	1,467	52.66	−1.29
Conservative	Mr. Colville	1,319	47.34	+1.29
Total valid votes		2,786	72.89	+1.38
Eligible voters		3,822		
Liberal hold		Swing		−1.29
Source: Elections Ontario
