= Durham West (provincial electoral district) =

Former provincial electoral district in Ontario, Canada

Ontario electoral district

Defunct provincial electoral district
- Legislature: Legislative Assembly of Ontario
- District created: 1867
- District abolished: 1999
- First contested: 1867
- Last contested: 1995

Durham West was a provincial electoral district in Ontario, Canada. It was created in 1867 at the time of confederation. It contained the towns of Pickering and Ajax.

The riding first existed from 1867 until 1926, when it was distributed into the Durham riding. When Durham was split back into Durham East and Durham West, as well as Durham North in 1975, the riding existed until 1999 when it was redistributed into Pickering—Ajax—Uxbridge and Whitby—Ajax.

== Members of Provincial Parliament ==
Durham West
Assembly	Years	Member	Party
1st	1867–1871	John McLeod	Liberal
2nd	1871–1871	Edward Blake	Liberal
2nd	1871–1874	John McLeod	Liberal
3rd	1875–1879	John McLeod	Liberal
4th	1879–1883	James McLaughlin	Liberal
5th	1883–1886	James McLaughlin	Liberal
6th	1886–1890	James McLaughlin	Liberal
7th	1890–1894	William Lockhart	Liberal
8th	1894–1898	William Reid	Conservative-Protestant Protective Association
9th	1898–1902	William Reid	Conservative
10th	1902–1904	William Rickard	Liberal
11th	1905–1908	John Devitt	Conservative
12th	1908–1911	John Devitt	Conservative
13th	1911–1914	John Devitt	Conservative
14th	1914–1919	John Devitt	Conservative
15th	1919–1923	William Bragg	Liberal
16th	1923–1926	William Bragg	Liberal
Riding dissolved, 1926-1975
30th	1975–1977	Charles Godfrey	New Democratic
31st	1977–1981	George Ashe	Progressive Conservative
32nd	1981–1985	George Ashe	Progressive Conservative
33rd	1985–1987	George Ashe	Progressive Conservative
34th	1987–1990	Norah Stoner	Liberal
35th	1990–1995	Jim Wiseman	New Democratic
36th	1995–1999	Janet Ecker	Progressive Conservative
Sourced from the Ontario Legislative Assembly
Merged into Pickering—Ajax—Uxbridge and Whitby—Ajax before the 1999 election

== Election results ==
=== 1975–1999 ===
1995 Ontario general election
Party	Candidate	Votes	%	±%
Progressive Conservative	Janet Ecker	29,232	54.58	+29.02
Liberal	Joe Dickson	13,974	26.09	–6.84
New Democratic	Jim Wiseman	9,444	17.63	–19.84
Independent	Neil Fonseka	904	1.69	–
Total valid votes		53,554	99.32	
Total rejected, unmarked and declined ballots		366	0.68	–1.31
Turnout		53,920	63.83	+1.47
Eligible voters		84,476		
Progressive Conservative gain from New Democratic		Swing		+24.43
Source: Elections Ontario

1990 Ontario general election
Party	Candidate	Votes	%	±%
New Democratic	Jim Wiseman	16,366	37.47	+20.62
Liberal	Norah Stoner	14,384	32.93	–15.85
Progressive Conservative	James Johnson	11,167	25.57	–6.18
Family Coalition	Bert Vermeer	1,761	4.03	+1.41
Total valid votes		43,678	98.01	
Total rejected, unmarked and declined ballots		887	1.99	+1.63
Turnout		44,565	62.36	+3.24
Eligible voters		71,468		
New Democratic gain from Liberal		Swing		+13.40
Source: Elections Ontario

1987 Ontario general election
Party	Candidate	Votes	%	±%
Liberal	Norah Stoner	16,733	48.78	+14.97
Progressive Conservative	George Ashe	10,890	31.75	–12.28
New Democratic	Jim Wiseman	5,779	16.85	–3.17
Family Coalition	Bert Vermeer	898	2.62	–
Total valid votes		34,300	99.64	
Total rejected ballots		124	0.36	–0.20
Turnout		34,424	59.12	+2.80
Eligible voters		58,228		
Liberal gain from Progressive Conservative		Swing		+13.63
Source: Elections Ontario

1985 Ontario general election
Party	Candidate	Votes	%	±%
Progressive Conservative	George Ashe	18,684	44.03	–8.75
Liberal	Brian Evans	14,348	33.81	+10.73
New Democratic	Don Stewart	8,495	20.02	–0.37
Libertarian	Eugene Gmitrowicz	911	2.15	–1.62
Total valid votes		42,438	99.44	
Total rejected ballots		238	0.56	+0.21
Turnout		42,676	56.32	+0.95
Eligible voters		75,778		
Progressive Conservative hold		Swing		–9.74
Source: Elections Ontario

1981 Ontario general election
Party	Candidate	Votes	%	±%
Progressive Conservative	George Ashe	17,029	52.77	+11.48
Liberal	Norman Wei	7,446	23.08	+6.56
New Democratic	Hugh Peacock	6,578	20.39	–18.98
Libertarian	Bill Leslie	1,215	3.77	+0.95
Total valid votes		32,268	99.65	
Total rejected ballots		113	0.35	+0.03
Turnout		32,381	55.37	–10.46
Eligible voters		58,482		
Progressive Conservative hold		Swing		+2.46
Source: Elections Ontario

1977 Ontario general election
Party	Candidate	Votes	%	±%
Progressive Conservative	George Ashe	12,688	41.30	+15.28
New Democratic	Charles Godfrey	12,095	39.37	+0.38
Liberal	Joe Bugelli	5,075	16.52	–17.96
Independent	Bill Leslie	865	2.82	–
Total valid votes		30,723	99.68	
Total rejected ballots		98	0.32	+0.03
Turnout		30,821	65.82	–6.83
Eligible voters		46,823		
Progressive Conservative gain from New Democratic		Swing		+16.62
Source: Elections Ontario

1975 Ontario general election
Party	Candidate	Votes	%
New Democratic	Charles Godfrey	11,356	38.99
Liberal	Desmond G. Newman	10,042	34.48
Progressive Conservative	Bill Pilkington	7,579	26.02
Libertarian	Terrence V. Coughlin	149	0.51
Total valid votes		29,126	99.71
Total rejected ballots		85	0.29
Turnout		29,211	72.65
Eligible voters		40,207	
New Democratic pickup new district.			
Source: Elections Ontario

=== 1867–1926 ===
1923 Ontario general election
Party	Candidate	Votes	%	±%
Liberal	William John Bragg	2,295	42.31	–13.89
Conservative	Arthur A. Van Camp	2,114	38.97	–4.83
United Farmers	Isaac T. Chapman	1,015	18.71	–
Total valid votes		5,424	100.00	
Total rejected ballots		–		
Turnout		5,424	67.51	–9.91
Eligible voters		8,034		
Liberal hold		Swing		–4.53
Source: Elections Ontario

1919 Ontario general election
Party	Candidate	Votes	%	±%
Liberal	William John Bragg	3,346	56.20	+9.83
Conservative	John Henry Devitt	2,608	43.80	–9.83
Total valid votes		5,954	96.83	
Total rejected ballots		195	3.17	+2.59
Turnout		6,149	77.42	–18.69
Eligible voters		7,942		
Liberal gain from Conservative		Swing		+9.83
Source: Elections Ontario

1914 Ontario general election
Party	Candidate	Votes	%	±%
Conservative	John Henry Devitt	1,647	53.63	–0.29
Liberal	William Loe Smith	1,424	46.37	+0.29
Total valid votes		3,071	99.42	
Total rejected ballots		18	0.58	–0.18
Turnout		3,089	96.11	+13.62
Eligible voters		3,214		
Conservative hold		Swing		–0.29
Source: Elections Ontario

1911 Ontario general election
Party	Candidate	Votes	%	±%
Conservative	John Henry Devitt	1,553	53.92	+2.89
Liberal	Arthur Austin Powers	1,327	46.08	–2.89
Total valid votes		2,880	99.24	
Total rejected ballots		22	0.76	–0.17
Turnout		2,902	82.49	–41.71
Eligible voters		3,518		
Conservative hold		Swing		+2.89
Source: Elections Ontario

1908 Ontario general election
Party	Candidate	Votes	%	±%
Conservative	John Henry Devitt	1,575	51.04	–0.98
Liberal	Thomas Baker	1,511	48.96	+0.98
Total valid votes		3,086	99.07	
Total rejected ballots		29	0.93	+0.44
Turnout		3,115	124.20	+35.38
Eligible voters		2,508		
Conservative hold		Swing		–0.98
Source: Elections Ontario

1905 Ontario general election
Party	Candidate	Votes	%	±%
Conservative	John Henry Devitt	1,690	52.02	+3.34
Liberal	William Rickard	1,559	47.98	–3.34
Total valid votes		3,249	99.51	
Total rejected ballots		16	0.49	–0.67
Turnout		3,265	88.82	+2.77
Eligible voters		3,676		
Conservative gain from Liberal		Swing		+3.34
Source: Elections Ontario

1902 Ontario general election
Party	Candidate	Votes	%	±%
Liberal	William Rickard	1,706	51.32	+3.01
Conservative	William Henry Reid	1,618	48.68	–3.01
Total valid votes		3,324	98.84	
Total rejected ballots		39	1.16	+0.85
Turnout		3,363	86.05	–4.16
Eligible voters		3,908		
Liberal gain from Conservative		Swing		+3.01
Source: Elections Ontario

1898 Ontario general election
Party	Candidate	Votes	%	±%
Conservative	William Henry Reid	1,825	51.69	+0.74
Liberal	A. Mitchell	1,706	48.31	–0.74
Total valid votes		3,531	99.69	
Total rejected ballots		11	0.31	+0.03
Turnout		3,542	90.22	+5.80
Eligible voters		3,926		
Conservative hold		Swing		+0.74
Source: Elections Ontario

1894 Ontario general election
Party	Candidate	Votes	%	±%
Conservative-PPA	William Henry Reid	1,646	50.94	–
Liberal	William Thomas Lockhart	1,585	49.06	–1.71
Total valid votes		3,231	99.72	
Total rejected ballots		9	0.28	–0.20
Turnout		3,240	84.42	+11.21
Eligible voters		3,838		
Conservative-PPA gain from Liberal		Swing		–
Source: Elections Ontario

1890 Ontario general election
Party	Candidate	Votes	%	±%
Liberal	William Thomas Lockhart	1,694	50.76	+0.72
Conservative	W. P. Prower	1,643	49.24	–0.72
Total valid votes		3,337	99.52	
Total rejected ballots		16	0.48	+0.42
Turnout		3,353	73.21	–0.57
Eligible voters		4,580		
Liberal hold		Swing		+0.72
Source: Elections Ontario

1886 Ontario general election
Party	Candidate	Votes	%	±%
Liberal	James Wellington McLaughlin	1,672	50.04	–2.59
Conservative	W. P. Prower	1,669	49.96	+2.59
Total valid votes		3,341	99.94	
Total rejected ballots		2	0.06	–0.05
Turnout		3,343	73.78	–0.01
Eligible voters		4,531		
Liberal hold		Swing		–2.59
Source: Elections Ontario

1883 Ontario general election
Party	Candidate	Votes	%	±%
Liberal	James Wellington McLaughlin	1,480	52.63	–0.02
Conservative	Mr. Burk	1,332	47.37	+0.02
Total valid votes		2,812	99.89	
Total rejected ballots		3	0.11	+0.11
Turnout		2,815	73.79	+0.89
Eligible voters		3,815		
Liberal hold		Swing		–0.02
Source: Elections Ontario

1879 Ontario general election
Party	Candidate	Votes	%	±%
Liberal	James Wellington McLaughlin	1,467	52.66	−1.29
Conservative	Mr. Colville	1,319	47.34	+1.29
Total valid votes		2,786	72.89	+1.38
Eligible voters		3,822		
Liberal hold		Swing		−1.29
Source: Elections Ontario

1875 Ontario general election
Party	Candidate	Votes	%
Liberal	John McLeod	1,257	53.95
Conservative	J. McClung	1,073	46.05
Turnout		2,330	71.52
Eligible voters		3,258	
Liberal hold			
Source: Elections Ontario

Ontario provincial by-election, January 1872 Resignation of Edward Blake
Party	Candidate	Votes
Liberal	John McLeod	Acclaimed
Source: History of the Electoral Districts, Legislatures and Ministries of the Province of Ontario

1871 Ontario general election
Party	Candidate	Votes
Liberal	Edward Blake	Acclaimed
Source: Elections Ontario

1867 Ontario general election
Party	Candidate	Votes	%
Liberal	John McLeod	1,473	68.80
Conservative	W. Martin	668	31.20
Total valid votes		2,141	77.43
Eligible voters		2,765	
Liberal pickup new district.			
Source: Elections Ontario

== See also ==
- List of Ontario provincial electoral districts
- Canadian provincial electoral districts
