= William Thomas Lockhart =

Canadian politician and merchant

Ontario MPP
- In office 1890–1894
- Preceded by: James Wellington McLaughlin
- Succeeded by: William Henry Reid
- Constituency: Durham West

Personal details
- Born: November 29, 1838 Smith Township, Peterborough County, Upper Canada
- Died: June 4, 1900 (aged 61) Bowmanville, Ontario
- Party: Liberal
- Spouse: Mary Renwick (m. 1880)
- Occupation: Merchant

William Thomas Lockhart (November 29, 1839 – June 4, 1900) was an Ontario merchant and political figure. He represented Durham West in the Legislative Assembly of Ontario as a Liberal member from 1890 to 1894.

He was born in Smith Township, Peterborough County, Upper Canada in 1839 and educated in Oshawa. In 1880, he married Mary Renwick. Lockhart was a grain dealer in Newcastle. He served in the local militia. Lockhart was defeated in his bid for reelection in 1894. He died at Bowmanville in 1900 after a brief illness.
