= Canada Dry =

Canadian brand of soft drinks

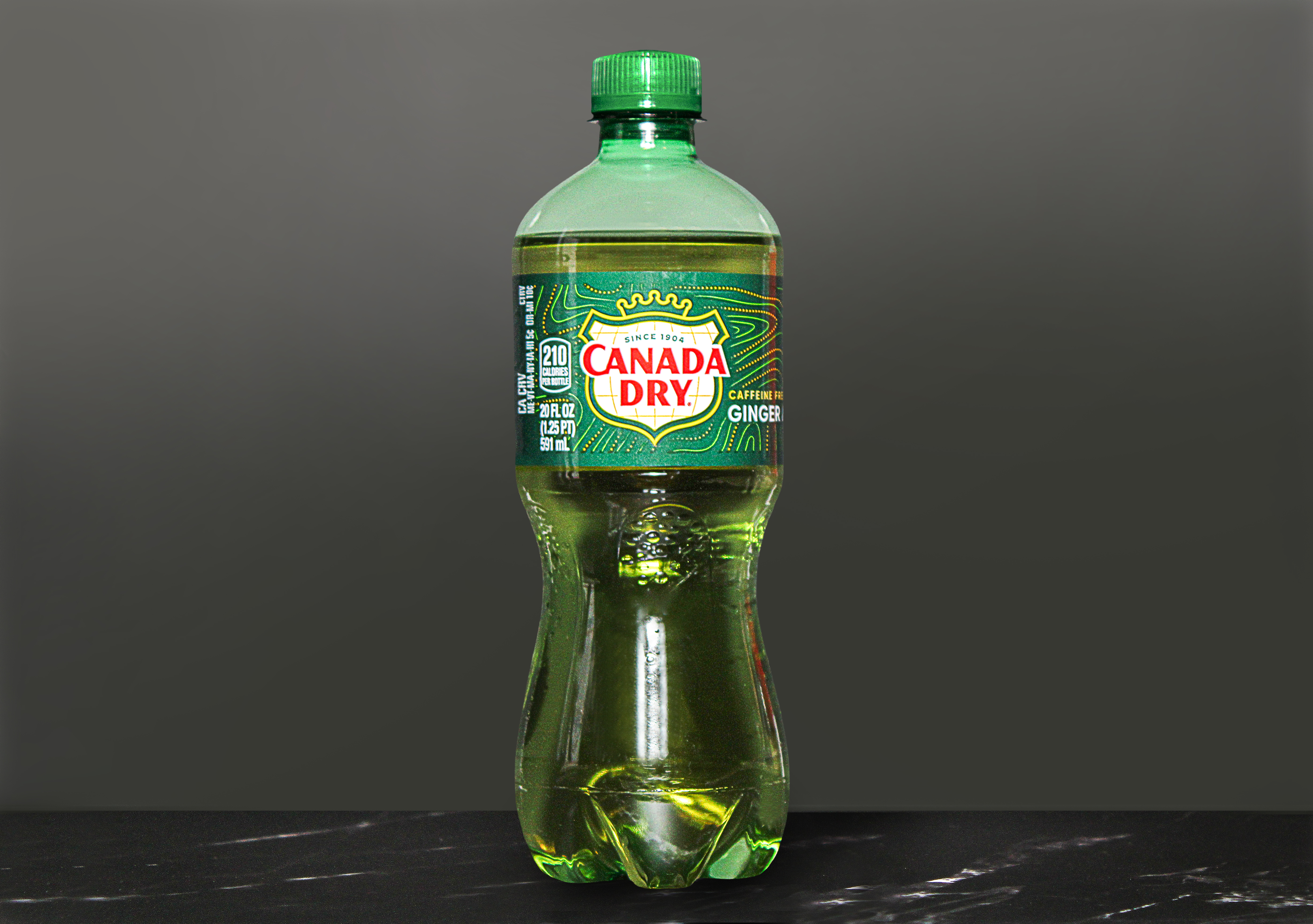
- Product type: Soft drink
- Current owner: Keurig Dr Pepper Canada
- Country: Canada
- Introduced: 1904; 122 years ago
- Markets: Canada, United States, Mexico, Chile, Colombia, Costa Rica, Peru, Europe, Japan, Turkey, Middle East, Africa
- Previous owners: Cadbury Schweppes (1986–2008); Canada Dry Ginger Ale Inc. (1923–1986); John J. McLaughlin family (1904–1923)
- Website: www.canadadry.com canadadry.ca

Canada Dry is a brand of soft drinks founded in Toronto, Ontario, in 1904, and owned since 2008 by the American company Dr Pepper Snapple (now Keurig Dr Pepper).

For over 100 years, Canada Dry has been known mainly for its ginger ale, though the company also manufactures a number of other soft drinks and mixers. Although it originated in Canada, Canada Dry is now produced in many countries across the world.

== Etymology ==
The "Dry" in the brand's name refers to not being sweet, as in a dry wine. When John J. McLaughlin originally made his new soft drink, "Canada Dry Pale Ginger Ale", it was far less sweet than other ginger ales then available; as a result, he labelled it "dry".

== History ==
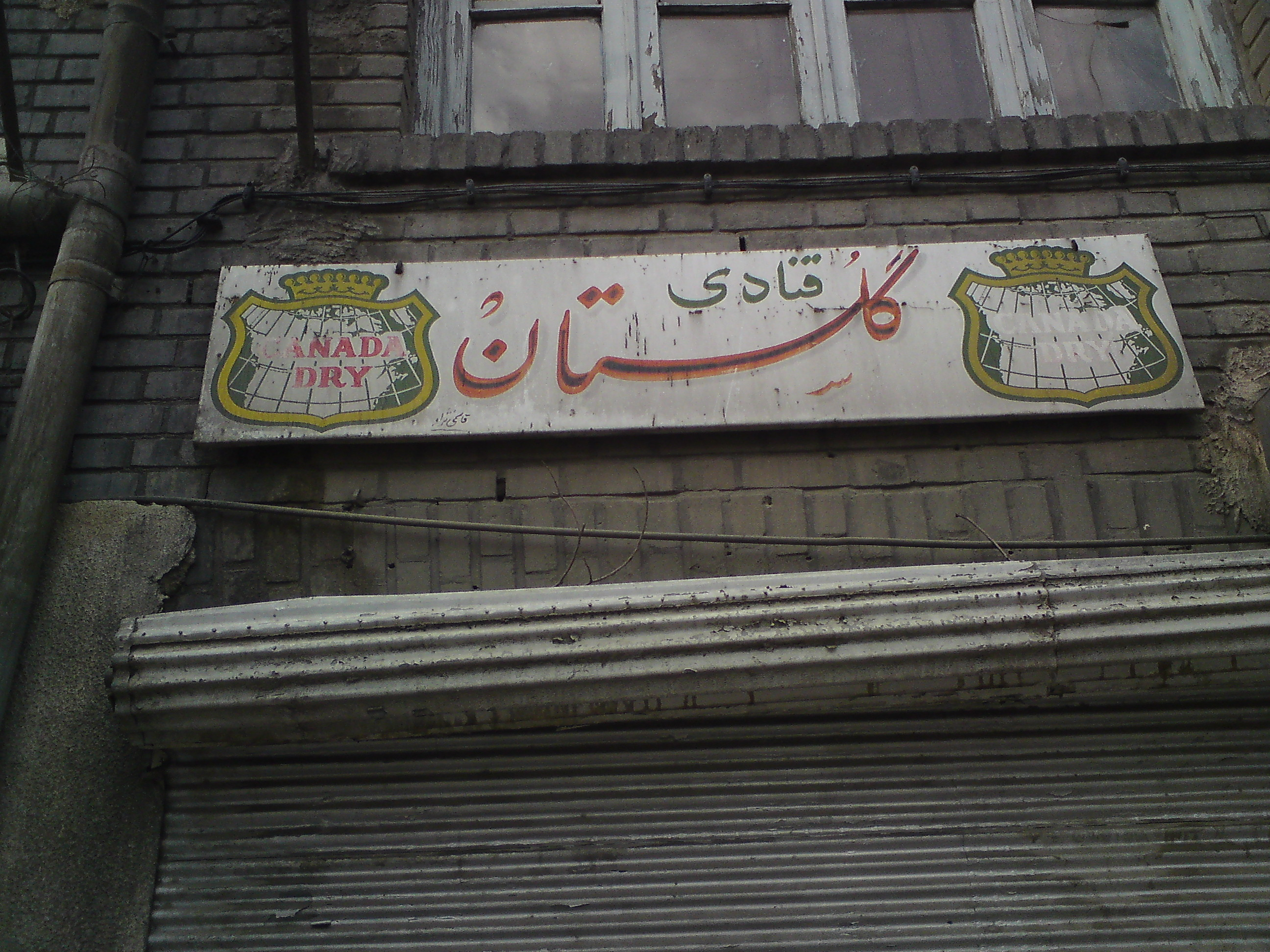
A faded Canada Dry sign on the site of a shuttered Iranian confectionery seen in 2011

During the late 1880s, Canadian pharmacist and chemist John J. McLaughlin was living and working in Brooklyn, New York, McLaughlin, the eldest son of Robert McLaughlin, founder of McLaughlin Carriage and McLaughlin Motor Car. observed the popularity of carbonated drinks at a pharmacy he managed. In 1890, he moved back to Canada and settled in Toronto. He opened McLaughlin Manufacturing Chemists and opened a carbonated water plant in Toronto. The company's products proved popular and it opened a larger factory on Sherbourne Street, selling its products nationally. An 1895 profile in The Globe praised his "Hygeia" brand ginger ale as tasting "very gingery" instead of resembling "throat liniment". His later formulations were considered too dark and syrupy, so in 1904, McLaughlin created "McLaughlin's Pale Dry Style Ginger Ale". In 1905, the drink was patented as "Canada Dry Pale Ginger Ale" and McLaughlin's wife Maud contributed the sales slogan "The Champagne of Ginger Ales."

A map of Canada was introduced on the label in 1907, with an accompanying beaver. The beaver was dropped and replaced with a crown after a royal appointment to the Viceregal Household of the Governor General of Canada, forming the long-lasting logo shield.

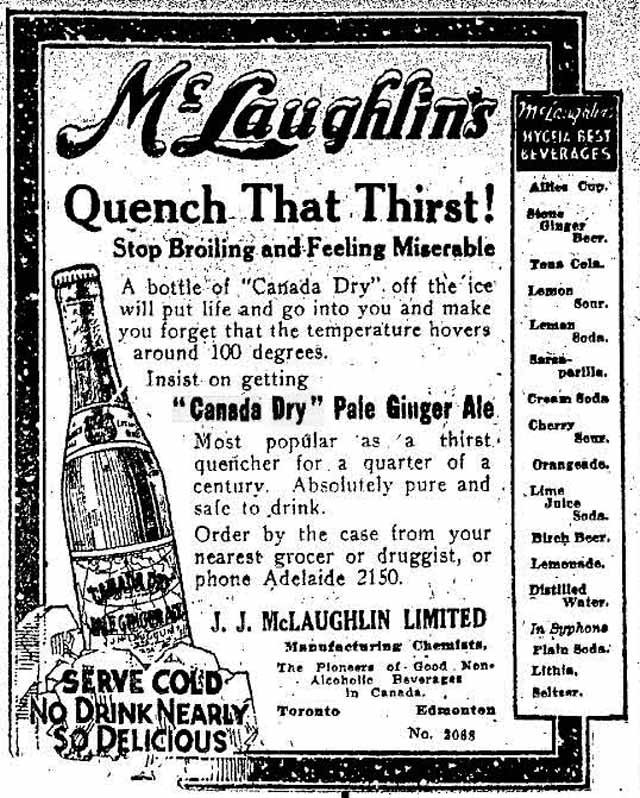
1916 Toronto Star ad for the product

When McLaughlin began shipping his product to New York, it became very popular, but he resisted selling the formula to American bottlers. After McLaughlin's death in 1914, the company was run briefly by his brothers, George and Sam. Responding to demand, they opened a bottling plant in New York City in 1922. P. D. Saylor and Associates bought the business from the McLaughlin family in 1923 and formed Canada Dry Ginger Ale, Inc., a public company.

Canada Dry's popularity as a mixer began during Prohibition, when its flavor helped mask the taste of homemade liquor. Sales and distribution exploded from two million to ten million bottles annually in 1930, making it the best-selling ginger ale in the world. In the 1930s, Canada Dry expanded worldwide. From the 1950s onward, the company introduced a larger number of products, including Cactus Cooler.

Norton Simon took an interest in the company in 1964, and it merged with Simon's other holdings, the McCall Corporation and Hunt Foods, to form Norton Simon Inc. Dr Pepper bought Canada Dry from Norton Simon in 1982. In 1984, Dr Pepper was acquired by Forstmann Little & Company, and Canada Dry was sold to R. J. Reynolds' Del Monte unit to pay off acquisition debt. RJR Nabisco sold its soft drink business to Cadbury Schweppes in 1986. Today, Canada Dry is owned by Keurig Dr Pepper, which was spun off from Cadbury Schweppes in 2008.

=== 'Made from Real Ginger' lawsuits ===
In 2019, Canada Dry faced false advertising lawsuits from a few consumers who requested class action status. Although the ingredients included a natural flavour extract made from ginger root, the plaintiffs said the drink did not have enough ginger flavor for people to be able to taste it, and that they thought the advertising slogan indicated that the drink was "made by chopping or powdering the root of the ginger plant", instead of using a small amount of liquid extracted from a ginger root. To settle this lawsuit, the company decided to stop making this claim in the US and to offer between US$5.20 and $40 to affected US consumers.

In early 2019, a class-action lawsuit was requested in Canada, where the Canadian Food Inspection Agency regulations specify that ingredients in food may be described as "real" if that ingredient "is present in the food, regardless of what form (e.g., frozen, powdered, ground, concentrated, etc.)". In a settlement, Canada Dry Mott's Inc. agreed to pay $200,000, inclusive of all expenses and fees, plus disbursements of $18,607.61, but it did not require the defendant to change its product labelling or advertising for products marketed in Canada. The settlement amount was to be distributed to the class members by way of cy-près donation to the Law Foundation of British Columbia, while two lead plaintiffs, Victor Cardoso and Lionel Ravvin, received $1,500 each.

The subjectivity of how much ginger is necessary before a product can be fairly described as being "made from real ginger" prompted one author to quip that "The truth is in the lie of the beholder".

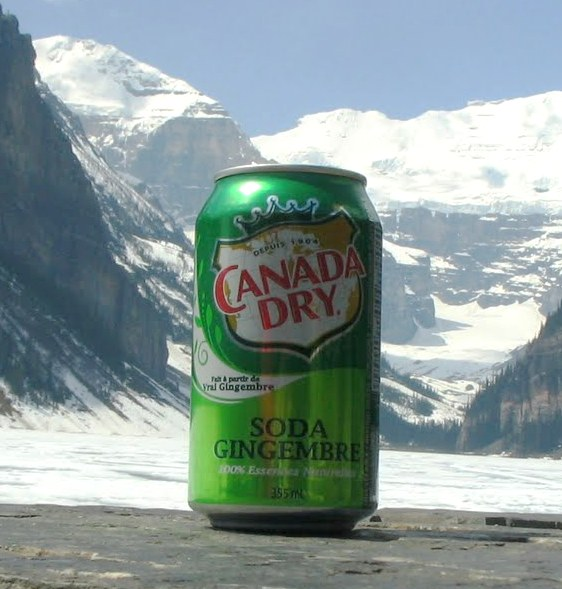
A can of Canada Dry ginger ale with the 2010–2022 logo at Lake Louise

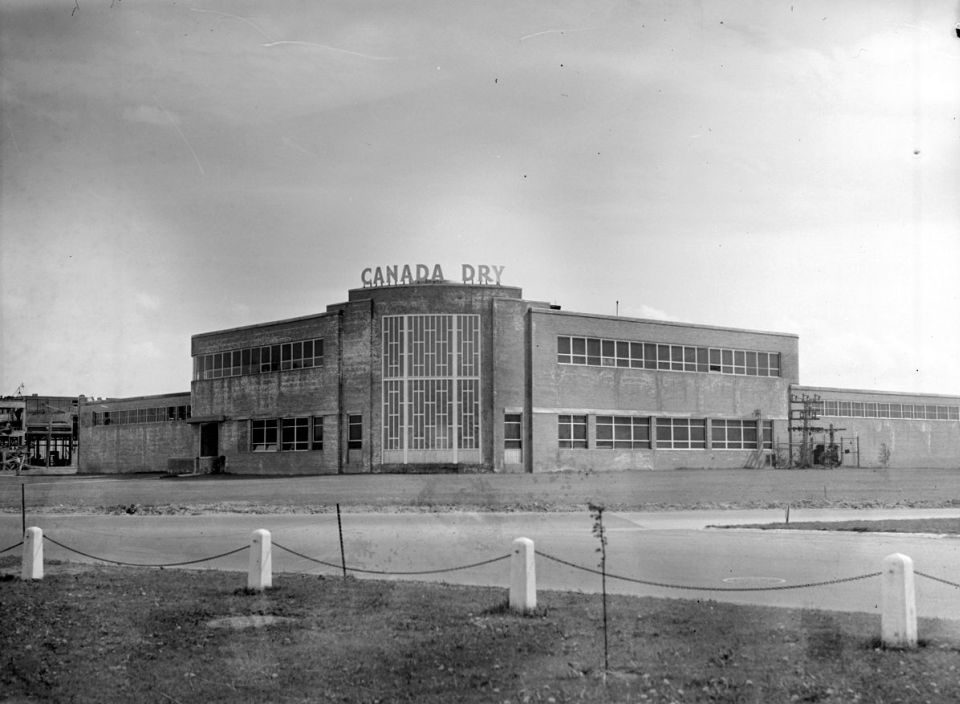
Canada Dry building in Saint-Laurent, Quebec, May 1946

== Marketing ==
Nylon Studios produced the song used in the Rabbit's "Jack's Farm" commercial featuring Canada Dry Ginger Ale. A Cantonese version of the ad was also produced.

== See also ==
- Canada Dry–Gazelle
- List of Canadian inventions and discoveries
