= Raiding Support Regiment =

British Army military unit

Shoulder patch worn by members of the Raiding Support Regiment

The Raiding Support Regiment (RSR) was a British Army regiment that was created in mid-1943 to support raiding forces that were operating during the Second World War in Albania, Yugoslavia, Greece, and various islands in the Aegean Sea. The unit was placed under the command of Lt. Col. Sir Thomas Devitt Bt., who was formerly of the Seaforth Highlanders. Devitt by the latter part of 1943 commanded five batteries:

- Machine-gun battery A containing 12 Vickers (British) machine guns, and a captured Spandau (German) machine-gun
- Mortar battery B containing heavy mortars
- Light anti-aircraft battery C containing 18 Browning anti-aircraft guns, and 50 heavy machine guns
- Anti-tank battery D containing 4 Italian 47 / 32 mm anti-tank guns
- Mountain battery E containing 4 U.S. M8 75 mm Pack Howitzers

The RSR began functioning as an independent unit in the war after Allied Forces landed in Italy. Regimental headquarters were set up at Bari in Southern Italy, with one squadron headquartered on the island of Vis, off the coast of Yugoslavia, that was placed under the control of Yugoslav Partisan forces. The RSR saw action in the Dalmatian Islands, Yugoslavia, Greece, and Albania, with some units fighting alongside guerilla forces in Greece, Yugoslavia and Albania. The RSR disbanded in early 1945 when the war in Europe was coming to a close.

As of 25 April 2025, there was one reported survivor of the RSR: 103-year-old John Morris, a resident at the Royal Hospital Chelsea.
