= Charles Godfrey (physician) =

Canadian politician (1917–2022)

Charles Godfrey CM OOnt

Member of Provincial Parliament
- In office 1975–1977
- Preceded by: Office established
- Succeeded by: George Ashe
- Constituency: Durham West

Personal details
- Born: September 24, 1917 Philadelphia, Pennsylvania, U.S.
- Died: July 24, 2022 (aged 104) Madoc, Ontario, Canada
- Party: New Democrat
- Profession: Physician, politician

Charles Morris Godfrey CM OOnt (September 24, 1917 – July 24, 2022) was an American-born Canadian physician, professor and politician in Durham Region. He served as an Ontario New Democratic Party Member of Provincial Parliament for two years in the Ontario legislature, but he is best known for having led the protests against the proposed Pickering International Airport in the 1970s, which forced the federal government to mothball the project.

== Background ==
Godfrey was born on September 24, 1917, in Philadelphia, Pennsylvania, but his family moved to Toronto when he was seven months old. His father was a physiotherapist who encouraged Godfrey to study medicine. He served in the Canadian military for five and a half years during World War II and qualified as a physiotherapist while serving. After the war, he enrolled at the University of Toronto Faculty of Medicine, paying for his schooling by working as a janitor and scrapyard worker before graduating in 1953. In 1956, he studied neurology at Oxford University on a McLaughlin Fellowship and became a fellow of the Royal College of Physicians in 1958. He also earned a Bachelor of Arts in 1962 and his Masters of Arts in 1975, and he was studying for his PhD in the late 1980s when he was in his 70s.

=== Medical career ===
After returning from England in the late 1950s, he became director of the Department of Physical Medicine and Rehabilitation at Toronto East General Hospital. He subsequently worked at Toronto General Hospital, Sunnybrook Hospital and the Toronto Rehab before joining Wellesley Hospital's rheumatic disease unit, ultimately becoming head of the hospital's rehabilitation clinic.

He was a professor in the department of rehabilitative medicine at the University of Toronto for over two decades. In 1968, Godfrey was the author of "The Cholera Epidemics in Upper Canada, 1832 – 1866". When in his 70s, he was still working 13-hour days teaching and maintaining his own practice while spending weekends at his country home in Madoc, Ontario with his wife, Margaret, and family. He resigned from membership in the College of Physicians and Surgeons of Ontario as of August 31, 2020.

=== International relief ===
For over 20 years, Godfrey and his wife, a nurse, would spend six weeks per year as volunteers travelling to developing countries on lecture tours on behalf of CARE. From 1983 to 1985, he chaired CARE/MEDICO and subsequently served as chairman of CARE's International Health Advisory Committee. In 1986, Godfrey was awarded the organization's Distinguished Service Award. He was invested as a Member of the Order of Canada in 1989, and he received the Order of Ontario in 1996.

== Politics ==
=== Activism ===
Arguing that "Doctors must show leadership within the community", Godfrey was also a dedicated political activist. After moving from Toronto to nearby Uxbridge, Ontario in search of more peaceful environs, Godfrey was upset by plans to build an international airport nearby. He organized "People or Planes" (POP) in 1975, which grew from a small grassroots group to a membership of 8,500 residents dedicated to preserving the proposed airport as farmland.

=== In government ===
Godfrey entered politics in a bid to stop the airport "from the inside". He was chosen as the Ontario New Democratic Party's candidate for Durham West and was elected to the Ontario legislature. "Two days after I was elected, the (federal) government said they weren't going to go ahead with the airport", Godfrey later told a reporter, saying "I don't think there's another politician in the world who can say he accomplished his political goals that fast." He served in the legislature for two years and was the NDP's environment critic, but found politics to be "irksome". In the 1977 provincial election, he lost by 593 votes to Pickering mayor George Ashe, who was running for the Progressive Conservatives, and returned to private life.

=== Out of government ===
Godfrey crossed party lines to endorse the Ontario Liberal Party in the 1981 provincial election and campaign for Liberal candidate Norman Wei, saying he preferred the Liberals' health care policies to those of his former party. He criticized the NDP for focussing on doctors' salaries, calling the issue a "red herring", rather than on hospital financing and health cutbacks. He said that he had never liked the NDP position on earnings, saying "I was not uncomfortable with it when I was there. I just don't think it's going to solve the problem."

Godfrey reiterated his opposition to an airport in 1989 when the plans were being revisited, saying "It'll cost a billion dollars for the airport, while I'm seeing people suffer needlessly because there aren't enough hospital facilities available." He was criticized for his stance by Gary Herrema, chairman of Durham Region, who complained that Godfrey never lived on land that had been expropriated for the airport but in nearby Uxbridge. "After all these years, he's still trying to exert influence over a part of the country he doesn't live in", Herrema protested, adding that "Sometimes I think he'd like to drop a few letters off the end of his name and just call himself God."

== Personal life and death ==
Godfrey turned 100 in September 2017, and died at his home in Madoc, Ontario, on July 24, 2022, at the age of 104.

== Honours ==

Ribbon	Description	Notes
	Order of Canada (CM)	Member; April 20, 1989
	Order of Ontario (O.Ont)	Member; 1996
	Canadian Volunteer Service Medal	
	War Medal 1939–1945	
	Canadian Centennial Medal	1967
	Queen Elizabeth II Silver Jubilee Medal	1977; Canadian Version of this Medal
	Queen Elizabeth II Golden Jubilee Medal	2002; Canadian Version of this Medal
	Queen Elizabeth II Diamond Jubilee Medal	2012; Canadian Version of this Medal
