= John Henry Devitt =

Canadian politician

Ontario MPP
- In office 1905–1919
- Preceded by: William Rickard
- Succeeded by: William John Bragg
- Constituency: Durham West

Personal details
- Born: February 1, 1851 Cartwright Township, Canada West
- Died: June 14, 1940 (aged 89) Cartwright Township, Ontario
- Party: Conservative
- Spouse: Elizabeth Watson (m. 1881)
- Occupation: Civil servant

John Henry Devitt (February 1, 1851 – June 14, 1940) was an Ontario political figure. He represented Durham West in the Legislative Assembly of Ontario from 1905 to 1919 as a Conservative member.

== Biography ==
He was born in Cartwright Township, Canada West, the son of Thomas Devitt and Jane McKee. He was a member of the township council from 1882 to 1890, serving as reeve in 1896 and county warden in 1899. He married Elizabeth Watson on June 1, 1881. He was a prominent member in the Orange Order. He died in 1940 and was buried at St. John's Cemetery in Blackstock.
