= Devitt baronets =

Baronetcy in the Baronetage of the United Kingdom

There have been two baronetcies created for persons with the surname Devitt, both in the Baronetage of the United Kingdom. One creation is extant as of 2007.

The Devitt Baronetcy, of Chelsea in the County of London, was created in the Baronetage of the United Kingdom on 4 July 1916 for the shipowner Thomas Devitt. He was a senior partner in the firm of Devitt and Moore, a manager of the Orient Line and the founder of the Nautical College, Pangbourne. He was succeeded by his grandson, the second Baronet. As of 2007 the title is held by the latter's son, the third Baronet, who succeeded in 1995.

The Devitt Baronetcy, of Pangbourne in the County of Berkshire, was created in the Baronetage of the United Kingdom on 25 June 1931 for Philip Henry Devitt. The title became extinct on his death in 1947.

== Devitt baronets, of Chelsea (1916) ==
- Sir Thomas Lane Devitt, 1st Baronet (1839–1923)
- Sir Thomas Gordon Devitt, 2nd Baronet (1902–1995)
- Sir James Hugh Thomas Devitt, 3rd Baronet (born 1956)

The heir apparent to the baronetcy is Jack Thomas Michael Devitt (born 1988), eldest son of the 3rd Baronet.

== Devitt baronets, of Pangbourne (1931) ==
- Sir Philip Henry Devitt, 1st Baronet (1876–1947)
