= John J. McLaughlin =

Canadian pharmacist and founder of Canada Dry Ginger Ale

- Born: John James McLaughlin; March 2, 1865; Enniskillen, Canada West (now Clarington, Ontario)
- Died: January 28, 1914 (aged 48); Toronto, Ontario, Canada
- Occupations: Pharmacist, manufacturer
- Known for: Founder of Canada Dry

John James McLaughlin (March 2, 1865 – January 28, 1914) was a Canadian pharmacist and manufacturer who was the founder of Canada Dry.

== Early life ==
John J. McLaughlin was born near Enniskillen, Canada West (now Clarington, Ontario), the eldest son of Mary Smith and Robert McLaughlin, the founder of McLaughlin Carriage and McLaughlin Motor Car which became General Motors of Canada.

Known as "Jack", he completed high school in Oshawa, Ontario, where he then became a pharmacist apprentice, before attending the Ontario College of Pharmacy in Toronto, and graduating in 1885. He did postgraduate study in pharmacy in New York City, worked as a pharmacy dispenser, and later managed one of the largest pharmacies in Brooklyn.

Because of the long-held belief in the health benefits of natural mineral waters, by the late 1880s a carbonated beverage industry had developed. With the addition of flavourings, they were increasingly consumed for pleasure, and often this was at drugstores.

== Canada Dry ==
After embarking on a tour of European carbonated water producers, McLaughlin returned to Toronto in 1890, where he founded a soda water bottling plant. In 1904, he launched Canada Dry "pale dry" Ginger Ale and in 1907, received a patent for "Canada Dry Ginger Ale."

== Personal life ==
McLaughlin married Maude Christie on October 23, 1890, in New York City. They had three sons and a daughter. He died at home of a heart attack January 28, 1914, and is buried at St James' Cemetery, Toronto.
