= Robert McLaughlin (industrialist) =

Canadian manufacturer (1836–1921)

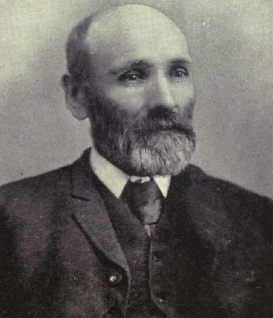

Mayor of Oshawa
- In office 1899–1899
- Preceded by: Frederick Luther Fowke
- Succeeded by: Frederick Luther Fowke

Personal details
- Born: November 16, 1836 Cavan Township, Upper Canada
- Died: November 23, 1921 (aged 85) Oshawa, Ontario
- Relations: James Wellington McLaughlin (brother)
- Children: 5, including Samuel and John
- Occupation: manufacturer

Robert McLaughlin (November 16, 1836 – November 23, 1921) was a Canadian industrialist and businessman. He founded McLaughlin Carriage then McLaughlin Motor Car Company which later became part of General Motors Canada.

== Life and career ==
McLaughlin was born in Cavan Township, Upper Canada in 1836, the son of an Irish immigrant, John McLaughlin. He moved to Darlington Township with his family in 1837.

He married Mary Smith in 1864, and bought a plot of land near the village of Tyrone from his father. He built a house and a workshop, and began building cutters and wagons. By 1869 his workshop was too small, and he set up a carriage works at Enniskillen, Ontario. McLaughlin also taught Sunday school in the Presbyterian church there.

In 1877, he moved his growing business to Oshawa to take advantage of available labour and railway access in the larger urban centre. He established the Oshawa Carriage Works, later known as McLaughlin Carriage.

In 1878, he married Sarah Jane Parr; his first wife had died of consumption. His sons George William and Sam also became involved in the business (George later served as VP of GM Canada), but eldest son John James left to become a chemist, started a soft drink company in Toronto, and invented Canada Dry ginger ale.

During the 1880s, McLaughlin designed a new type of steering gear for carriages; through a distributor, the company sold about 20,000 of these gears to other carriage companies.

McLaughlin served on the board of health and board of water commissioners at Oshawa and also served as mayor. He was the first president of the local YMCA. After his carriage works was destroyed in a fire in 1899, he relocated to Gananoque but returned to Oshawa the following year, rebuilding the business with a loan from the city. In 1901, he married Eleanor McCulloch after the death of his second wife.

In 1907, on the advice of his sons Sam and George, he set up the McLaughlin Motor Car Company to manufacture automobiles. McLaughlin supported tariffs restricting trade with the United States and opposed Sir Wilfrid Laurier's free trade proposals in 1910–11. In 1915, he sold off his carriage manufacturing business. In 1918, his companies were taken over by General Motors.

McLaughlin died at Oshawa in 1921 of colon cancer. His brother James was a doctor and member of the Ontario assembly.
