= Sir Thomas Devitt, 2nd Baronet =

England international rugby union player

Thomas Devitt
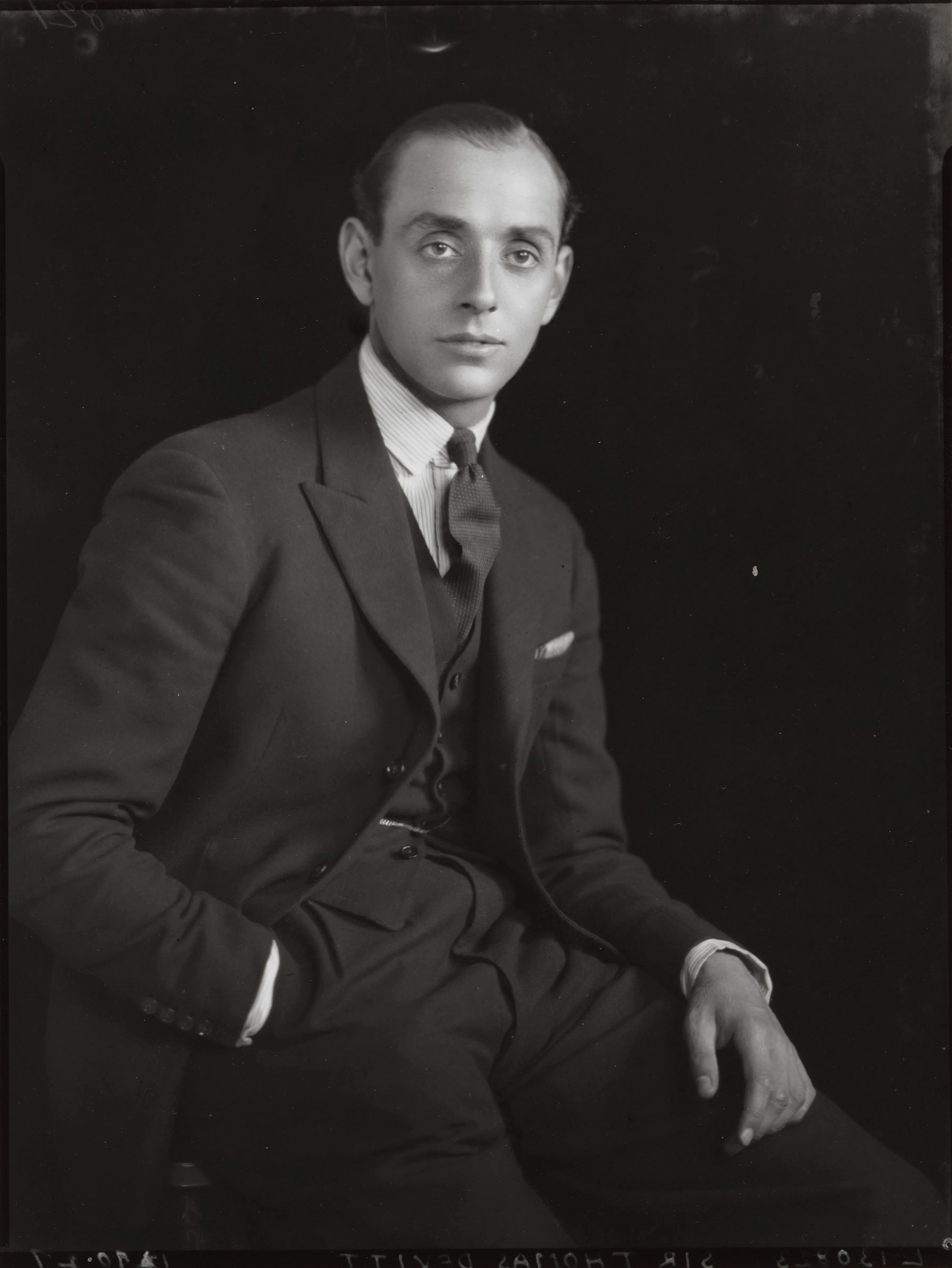
- Devitt in 1927
- Full name: Thomas Gordon Devitt
- Born: 27 December 1902 Shelley's Cottage, Englefield Green, Surrey, England
- Died: 23 December 1995 (aged 92) Colchester, Essex, England
- School: Sherborne School
- University: Corpus Christi College

Rugby union career
- Position: Wing
International career
Years	Team	Apps	(Points)
1926–28	England	4	(0)

Sir Thomas Gordon Devitt, 2nd Baronet (27 December 1902 – 23 December 1995) was a British Army officer, businessman, peer and international rugby union player of the 1920s.

Born in Surrey, Devitt was the grandson of shipping magnate Sir Thomas Devitt, 1st Baronet, one of the founders of Devitt and Moore. He attended the Sherborne School and Corpus Christi College, Cambridge, and subsequently commissioned into the Seaforth Highlanders in December 1926.

Devitt was a speedy wing three-quarter and scored a hat-trick of tries for Cambridge University in their winning 1925 Varsity Match side. He also played with Blackheath and from 1926 to 1928 gained four caps for England.

During World War II, Devitt served as a lieutenant colonel in the Seaforth Highlanders and was later commander of the Raiding Support Regiment. He was made an Officer of the Order of the Phoenix (with swords) in 1944.

Devitt was a Governor of Sherborne School from 1967 to 1975.

== See also ==
- List of England national rugby union players
