= McLaughlin Motor Car Company =

Canadian manufacturer of automobiles

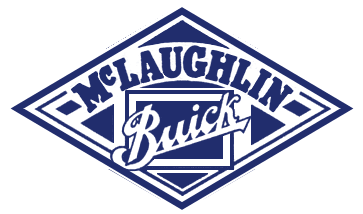
- Formerly: List: McLaughlin Motor Car Company Limited (1907–1918); McLaughlin-Buick (1915–1918) (Note: The name appeared on some models during that period to 1942, due a partnership with GM division Buick.); Chevrolet Motor Company of Canada Limited (1915–1918)
- Type: Private
- Industry: Automotive
- Predecessor: McLaughlin Carriage Company
- Founded: 1907
- Founder: Robert McLaughlin
- Defunct: 1918
- Fate: Sold to General Motors
- Successor: General Motors of Canada
- Headquarters: Oshawa, Ontario, Canada
- Products: Carriages (1907–1915); Automobiles (1907–1918)

McLaughlin Motor Car Company Limited was a Canadian manufacturer of automobiles headquartered in Oshawa, Ontario. Founded by Robert McLaughlin, it once was the largest carriage manufacturing factory in the British Empire.

Around 1905, Robert's son Sam started building automobiles. By 1907, this enterprise had grown to include the manufacture of McLaughlin automobiles with Buick engines. In 1915, the company manufactured Chevrolet vehicles for the U.S. and Canadian market. The carriage end of the business was then sold to Carriage Factories Limited of Orillia, Ontario. James Brockett Tudhope's Carriage Factories ended carriage production and changed to manufacturing truck and car parts. The Tudhope firm was sold in 1924 to Cockshutt Plow Company and merged into the Cockshutt Plow owned Canada Carriage and Body Limited of Brantford, Ontario. The Brantford-based firm is now Trailmobile Canada.

McLaughlin was taken over by General Motors in 1918 and merged into General Motors of Canada.

== History ==
=== McLaughlin Carriage Company ===
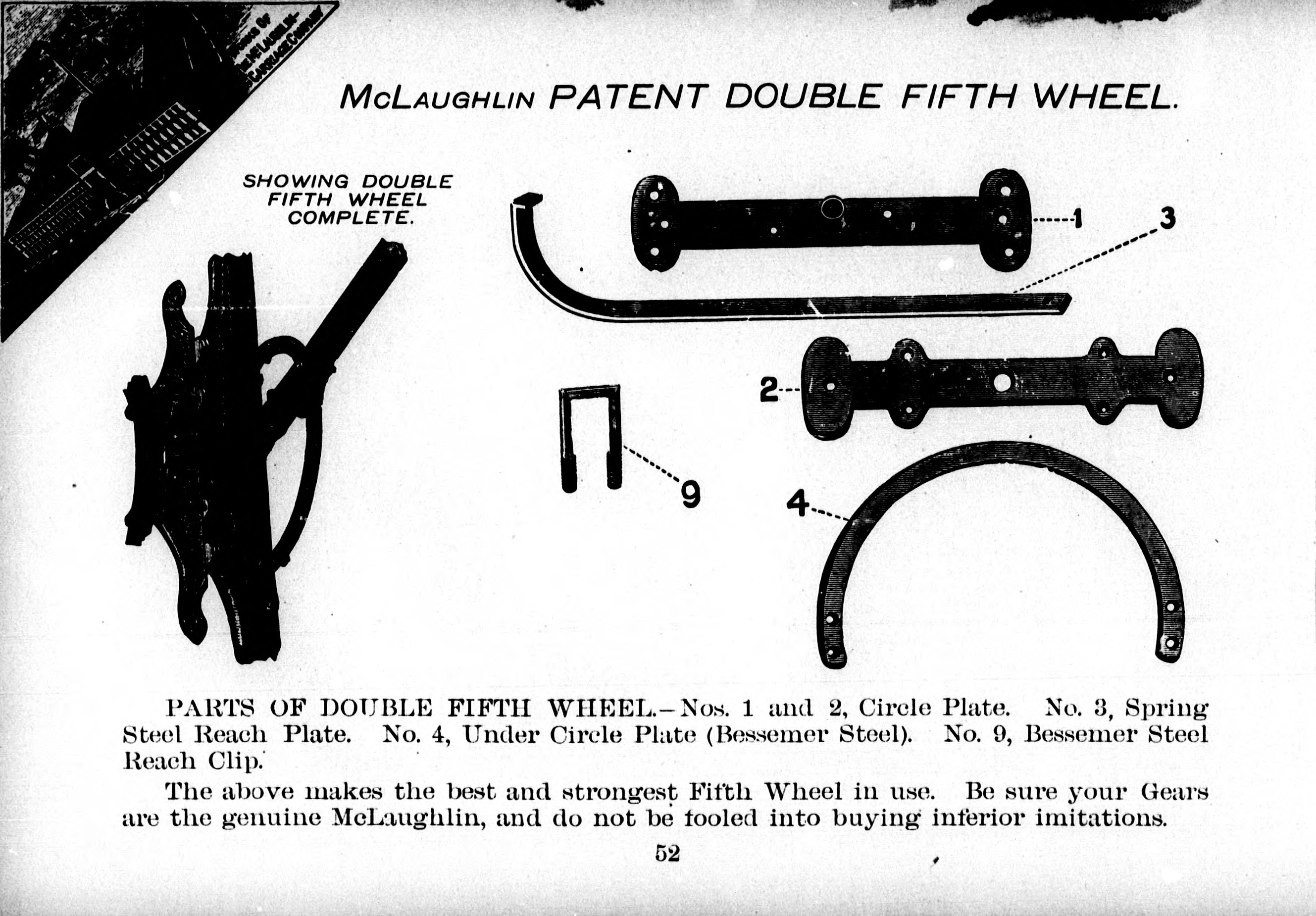
McLaughlin's fifth-wheel

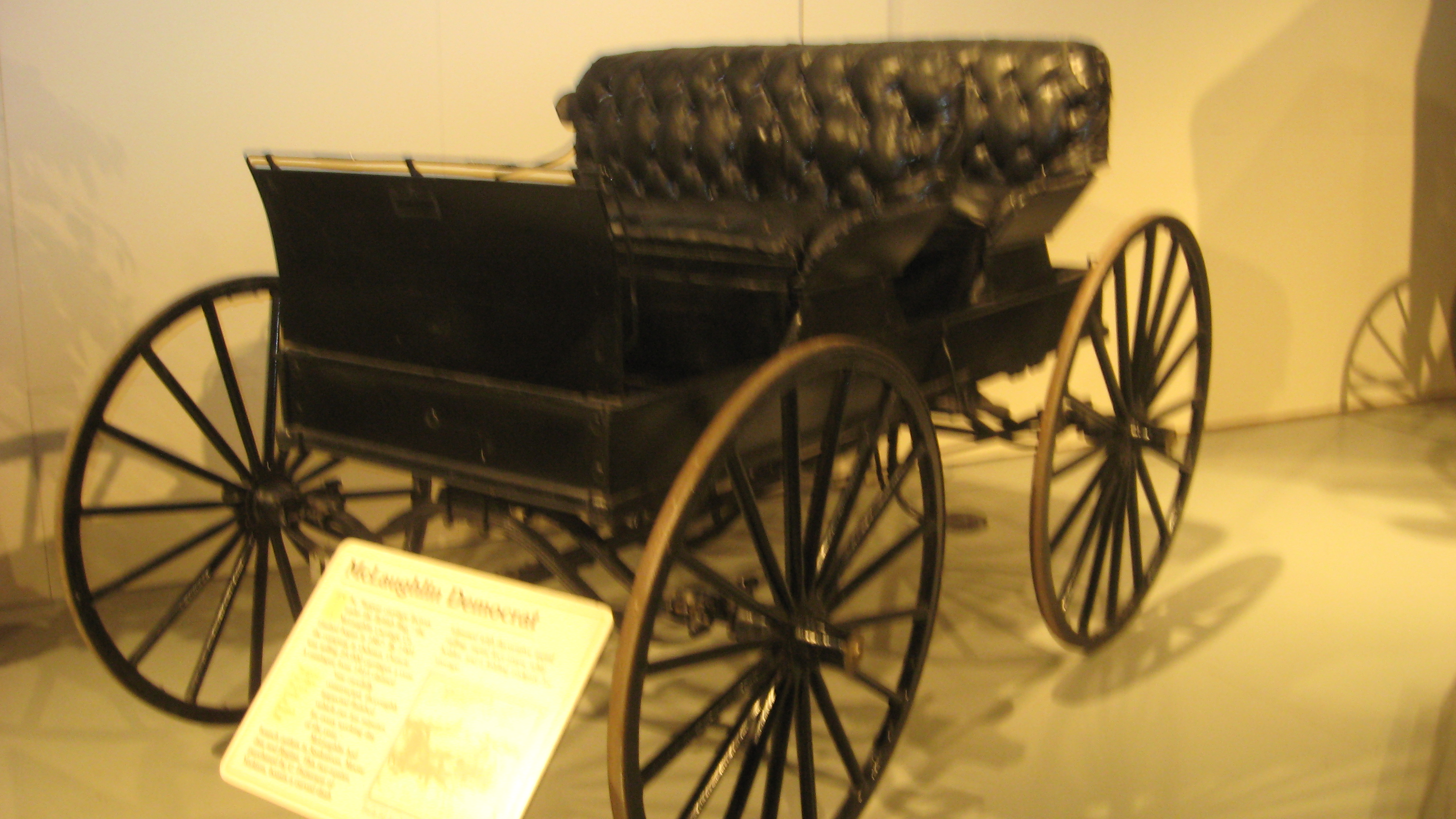
1910s Democrat buckboard

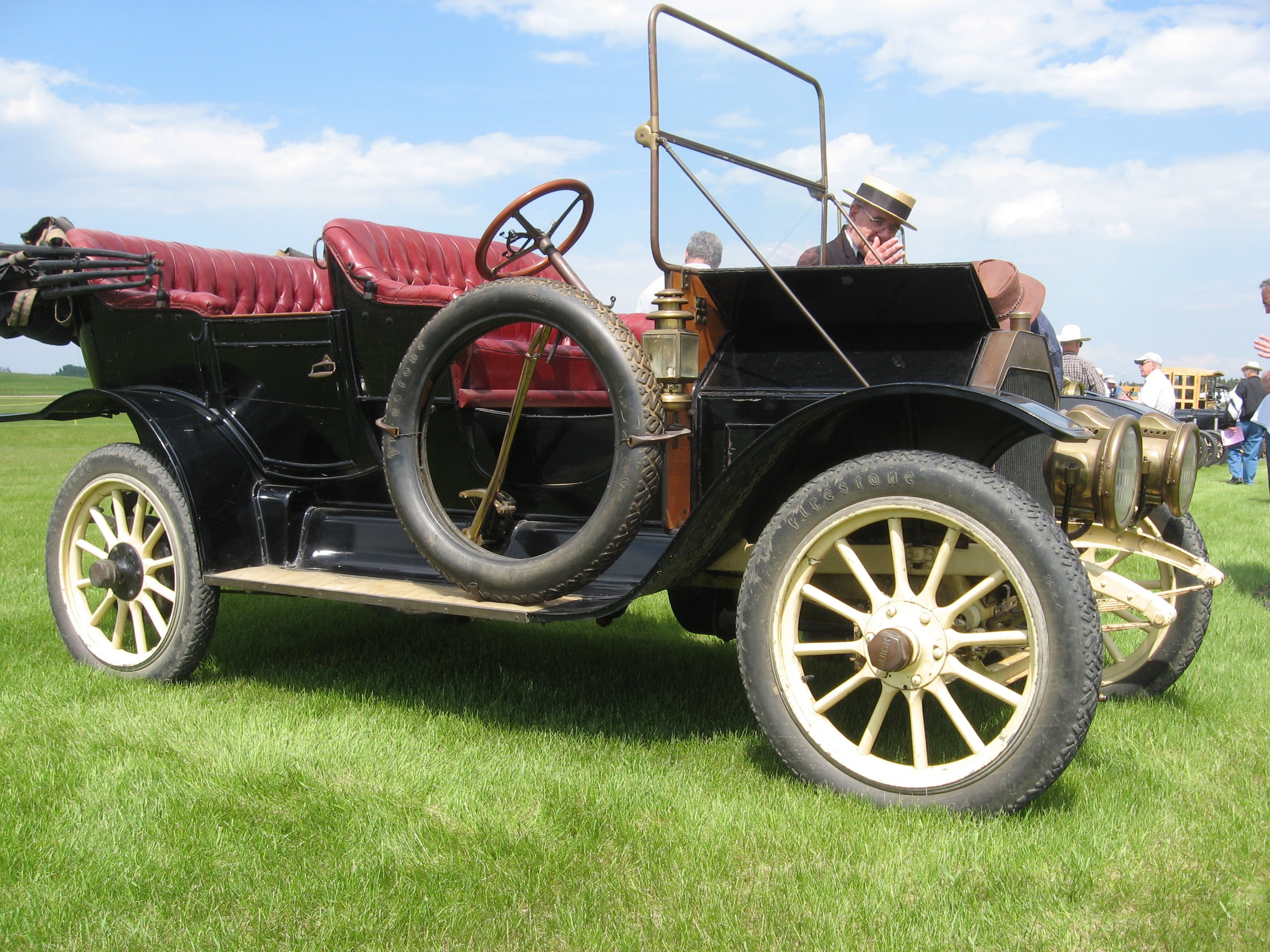
1910 Model 41 touring car

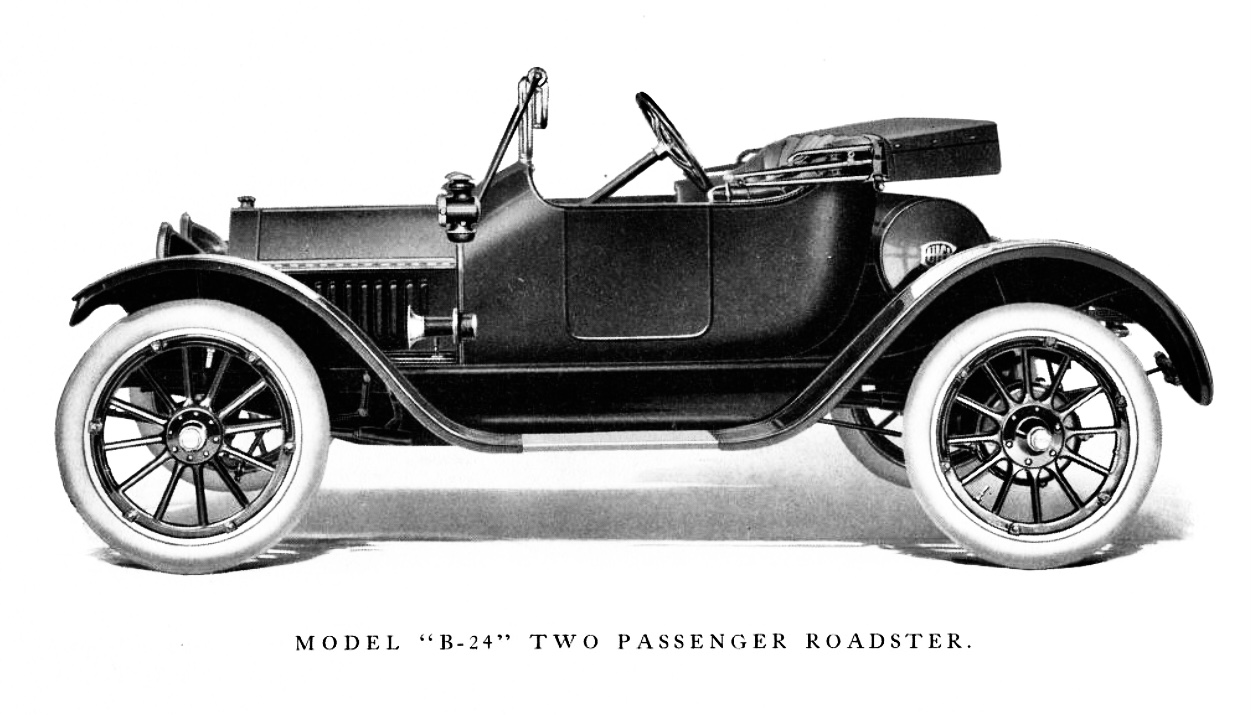
McLaughlin Model B24 (1913-1915)

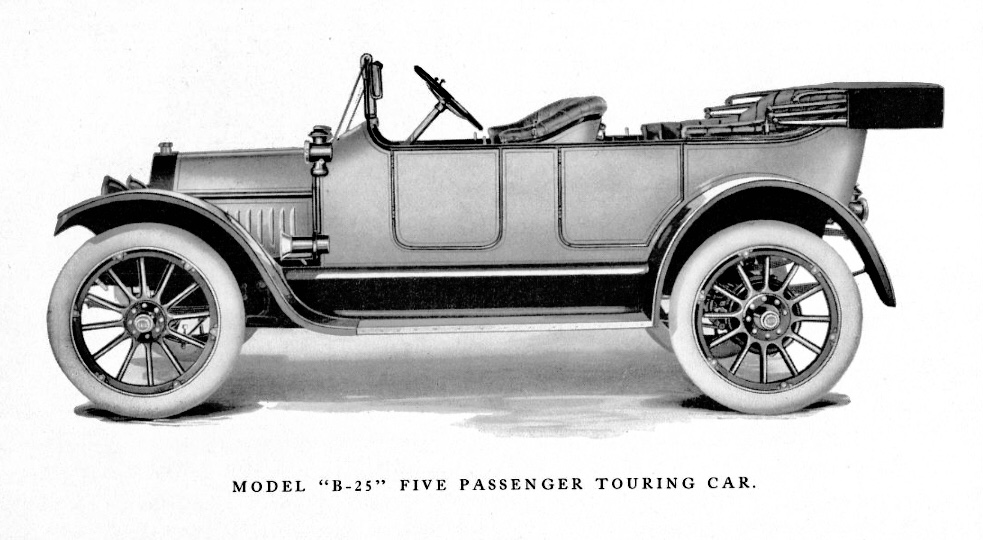
McLaughlin Model B25 (1913-1915)

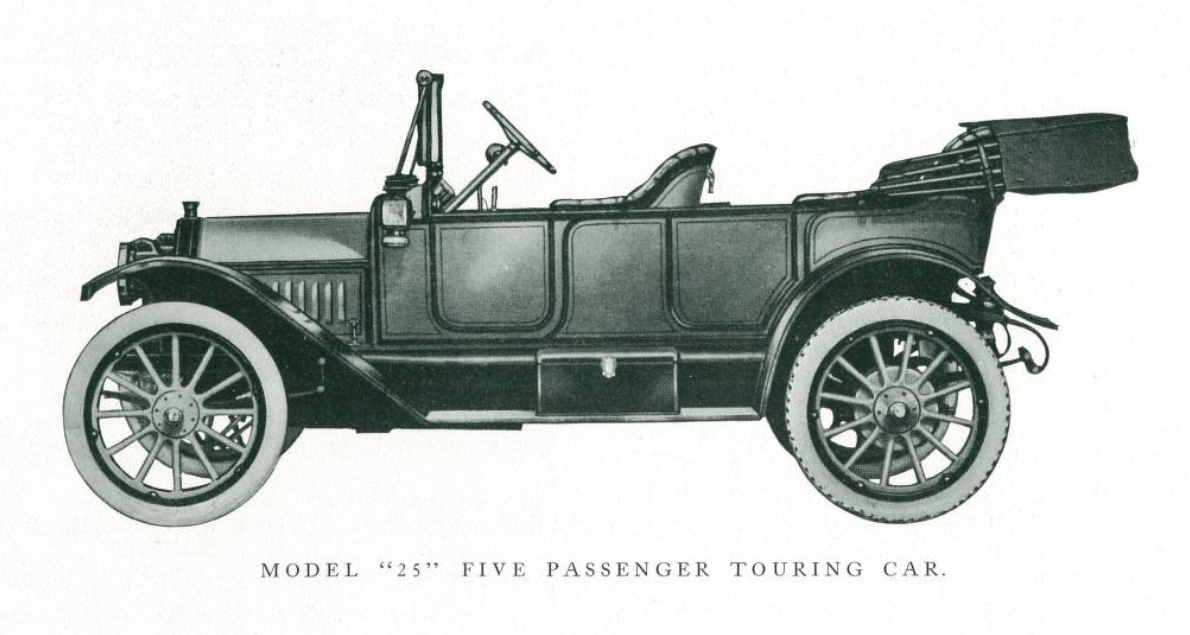
McLaughlin Model 25 (1913-1915))

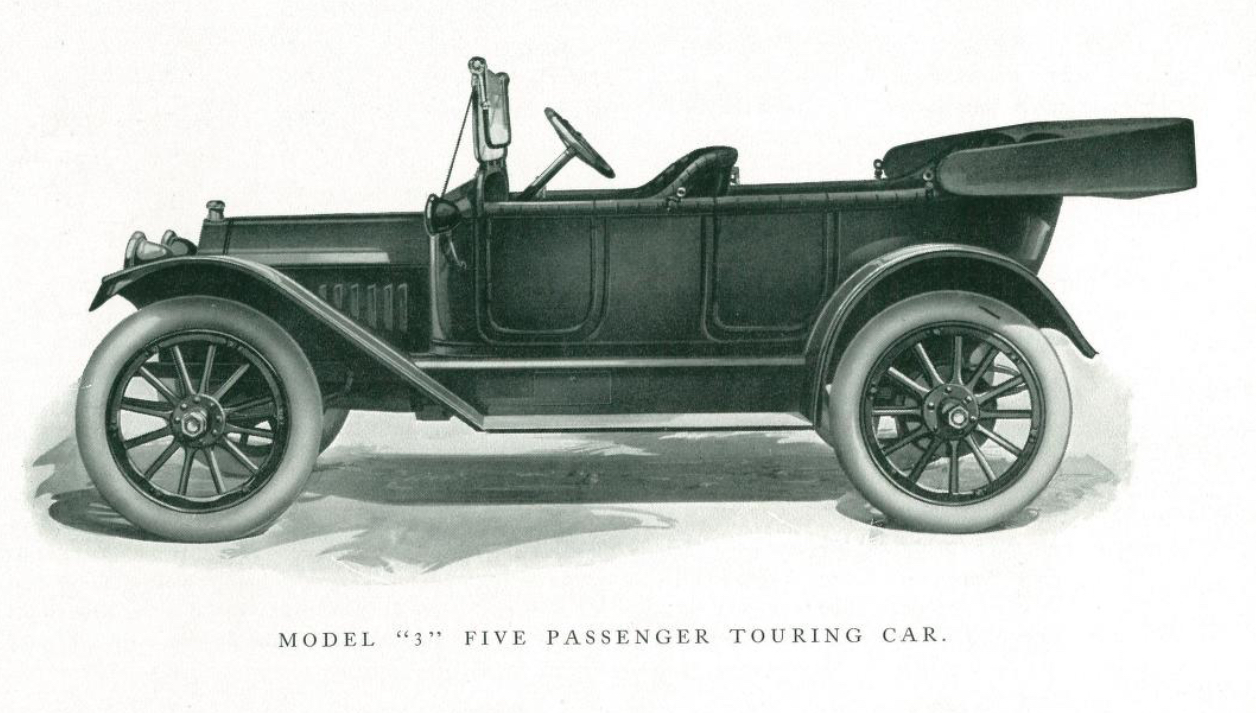
McLaughlin Model 3 (1914)

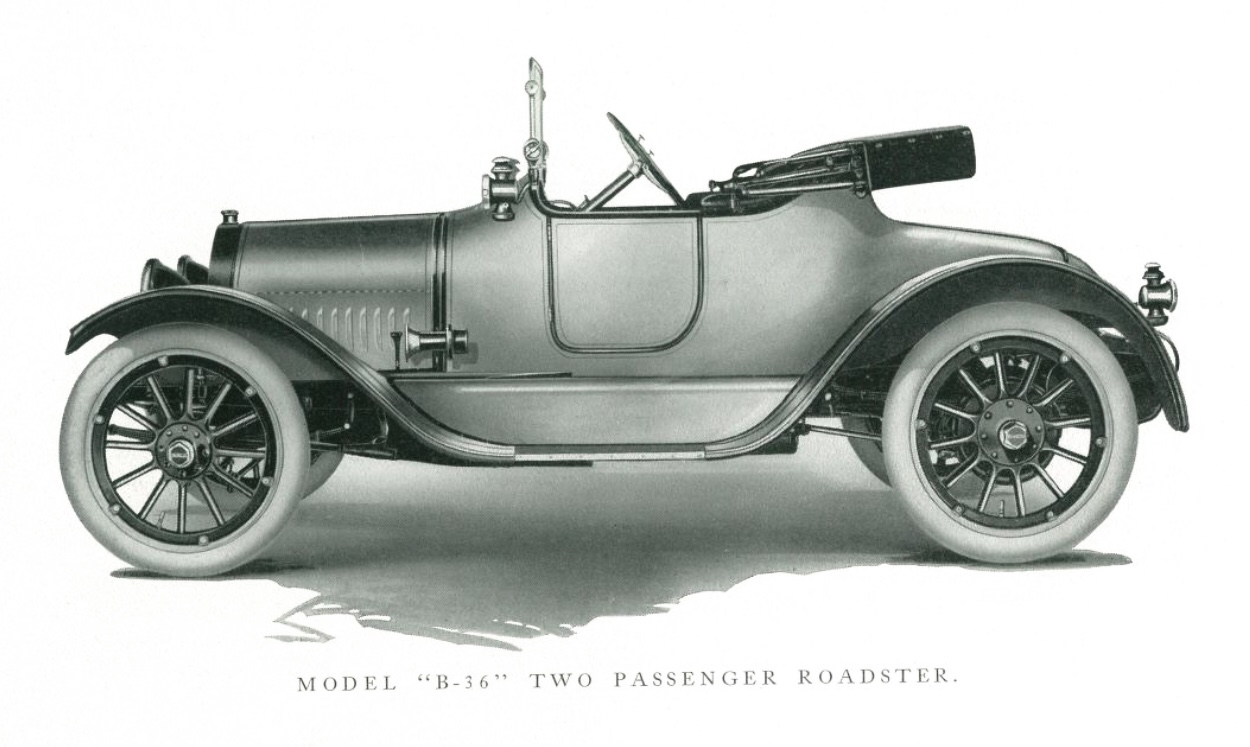
McLaughlin Model B36 (1914-1915)

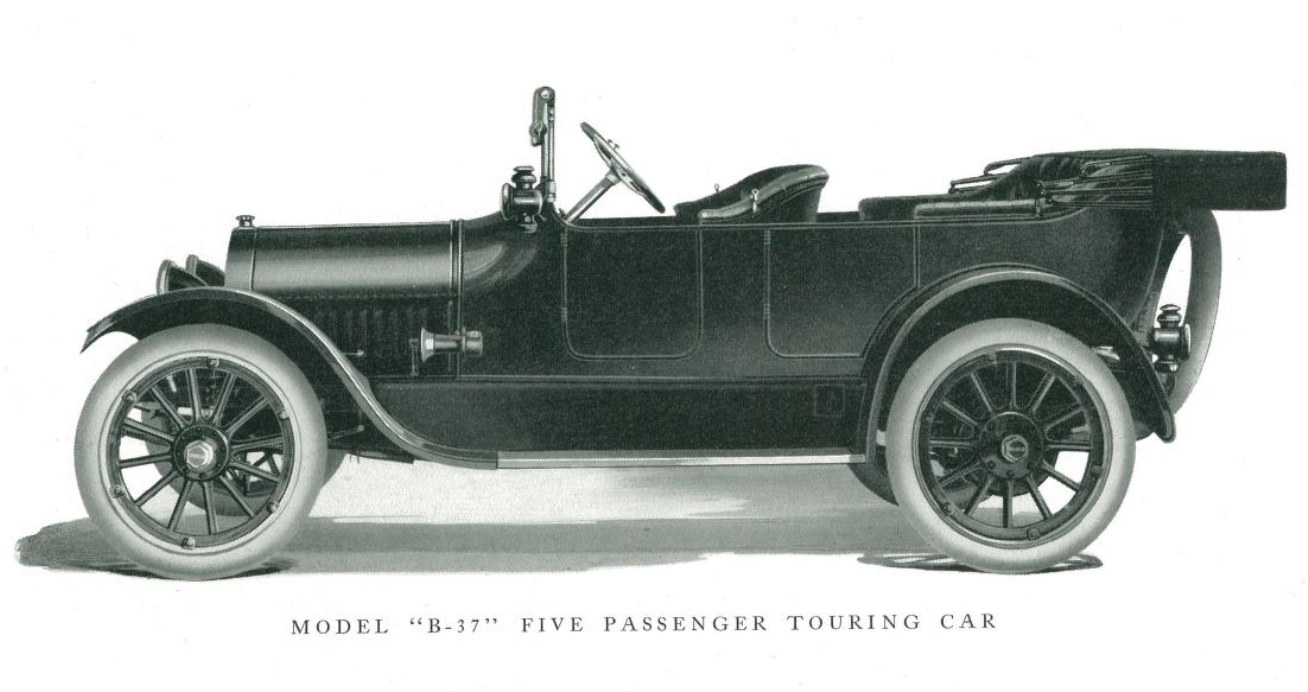
McLaughlin Model B37 (1914-1915)

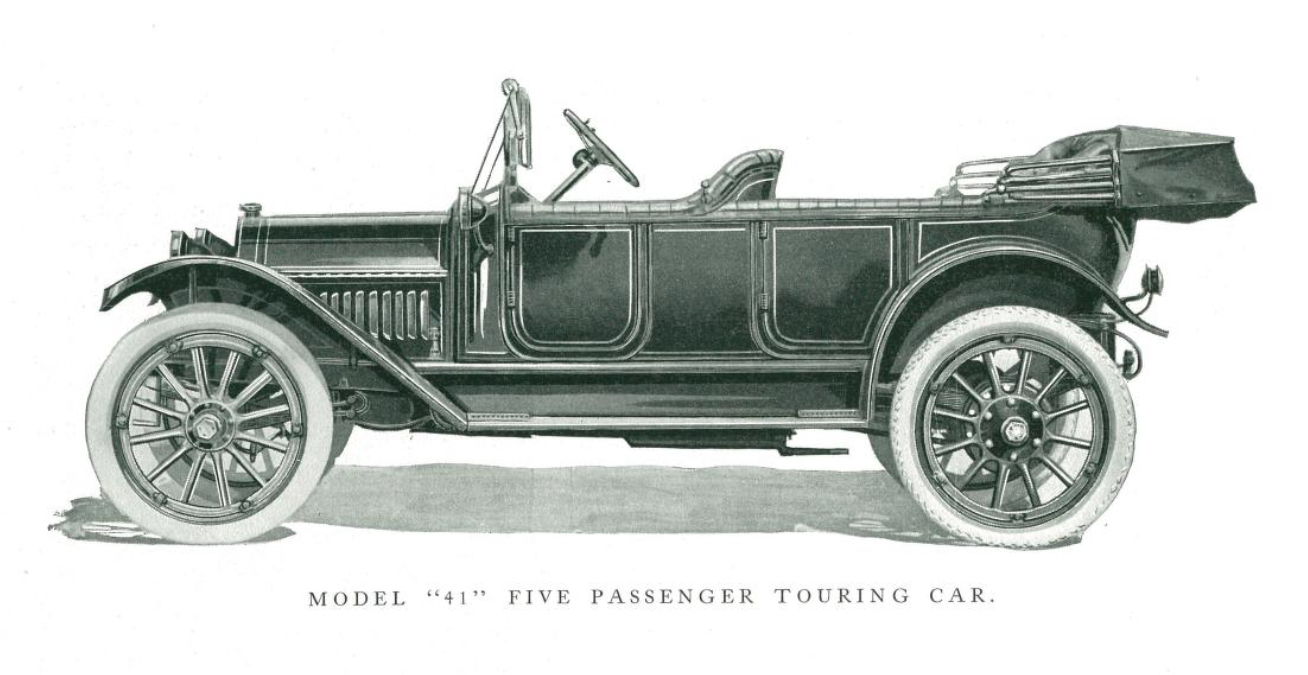
McLaughlin Model 41 (1914)

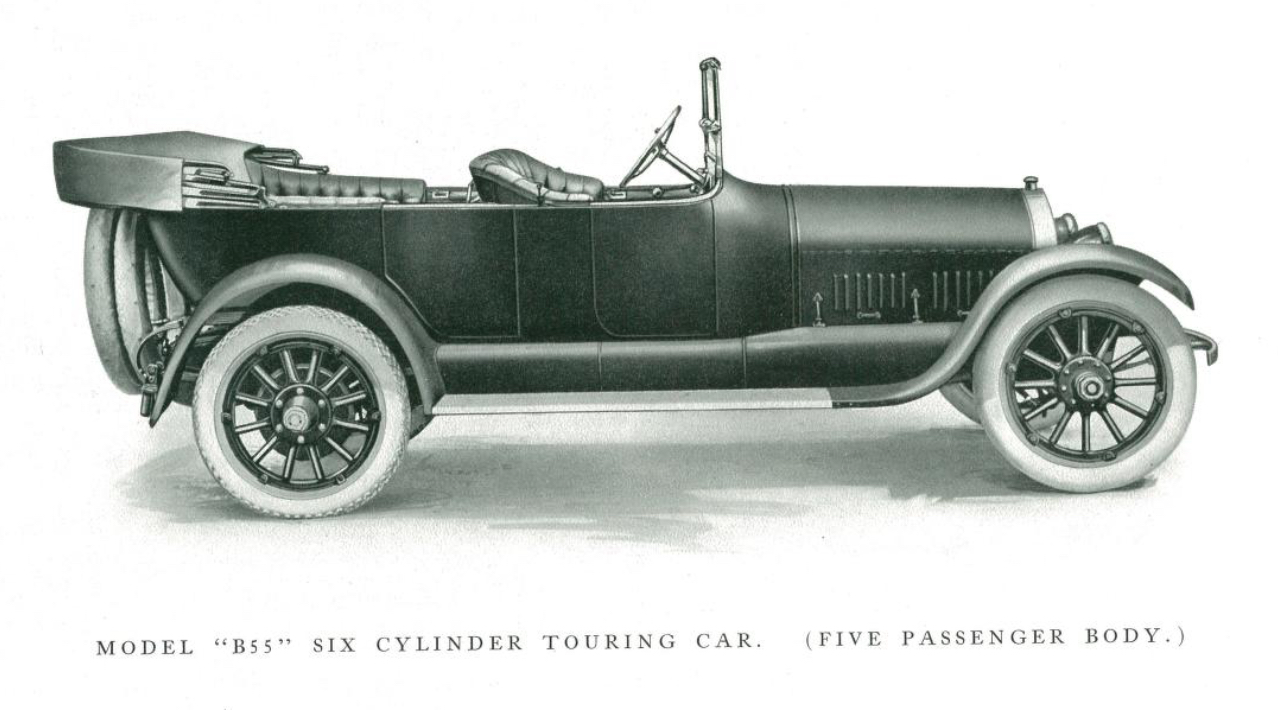
McLaughlin Model B55 (1914-1916)

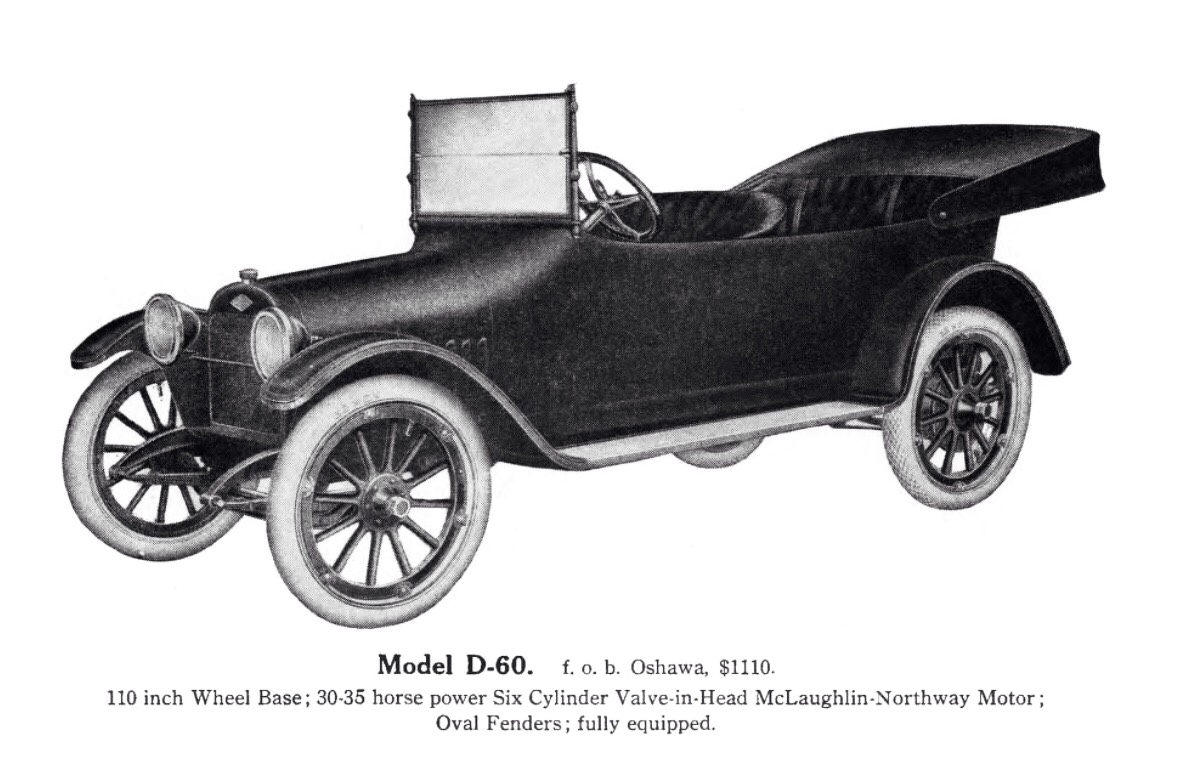
McLaughlin Model D60 (1916)

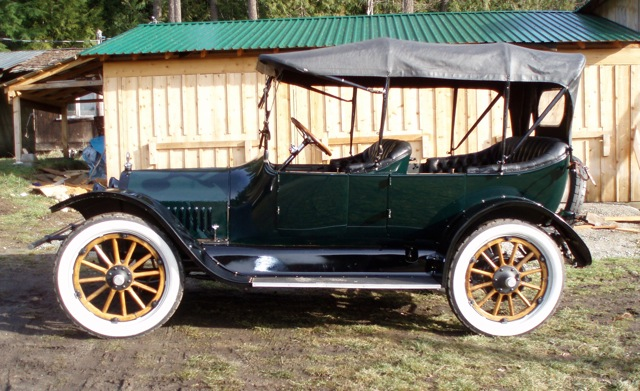
1915 touring car

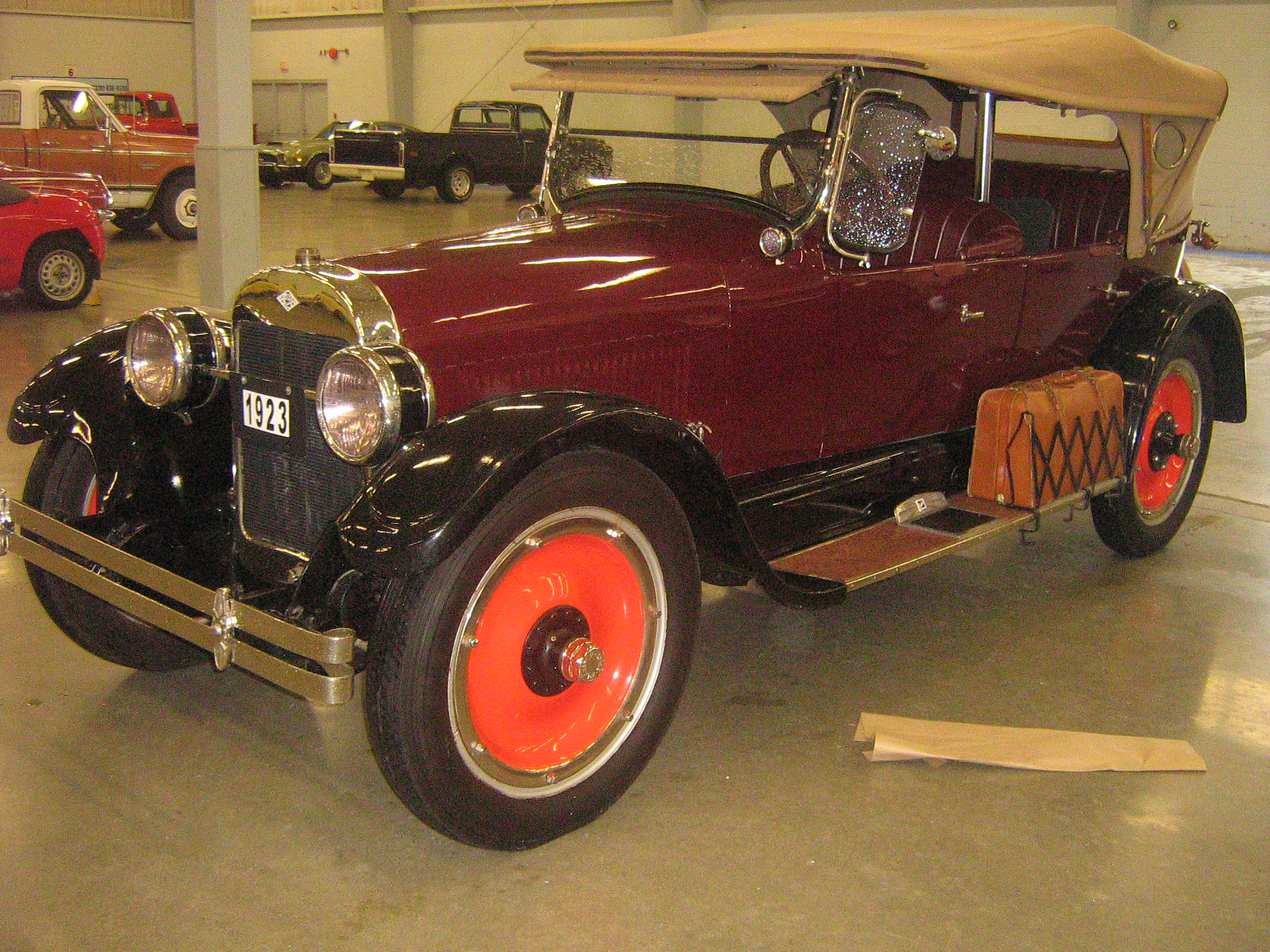
1923 Master Six Special touring car, manufactured by GM Canada

Robert McLaughlin began building carriages in 1867 beside the cutters and wagons in his blacksmith's shop in Enniskillen, a small village 20 kilometres (12 mi) northeast of Oshawa, Ontario. In need of more workers to build his horse-drawn carriages, staunch Presbyterian McLaughlin moved to Oshawa in 1876.

McLaughlin developed and (in the early 1880s) patented a fifth-wheel mechanism, which greatly improved comfort and safety. Attracting a great deal of demand, he ignored tempting offers and elected to sell the mechanism to his competitors rather than license other manufacturers. This enthusiasm, now for his complete carriages, spread across Canada. Before the end of the century, there was a McLaughlin sales office in London, England.

On 7 December 1899, the carriage works was destroyed by fire. "We were helpless," R.S. "Sam" McLaughlin later told Maclean's Magazine, "we could only stand and watch our life's work go up in flames. Not only we McLaughlins, but the six hundred men who depended for a living on the carriage works." The City of Oshawa lent McLaughlin $50,000 to rebuild.

McLaughlin Carriage Company of Canada Limited was incorporated in 1901. Production numbers that year topped 25,000 units and included 140 different models, and sales exceeded one million dollars.

By 1915, McLaughlin was making one carriage every ten minutes. McLaughlin Carriage Company was sold to Carriage Factories Limited of Orillia, Ontario, in 1915. The major carriage manufacturers did not close their doors but switched to automobile bodies.

=== Automobile manufacturing ===
Around 1905, Robert's son Sam became interested in manufacturing automobiles and traveled to Jackson, Michigan, to purchase a Jackson automobile. While in Jackson, Sam bumped into Billy Durant, who was manufacturing in that city. Sam and Billy had become acquainted, as both were affiliated with the carriage manufacturing business. Durant offered to make a deal, and McLaughlin purchased a Buick from a dealer in Toronto to better understand the product. Before he was halfway to Oshawa (approximately a 30-mile drive), McLaughlin knew he preferred the design of the Buick to the Jackson automobile. However, he and Durant were unable to reach a deal to combine manufacturing operations.

Instead, McLaughlin decided to form his own enterprise. In 1907, the McLaughlin Motor Car Company Limited was formed. An American engineer by the name of Arthur Milbrath was hired away from A.O. Smith to design the McLaughlin Model A automobile. "We brought him [Milbrath] to Oshawa," Sam later recounted, "and installed him in one of our buildings, on the west side of Mary Street, which had been set aside as the automobile shop. We equipped it with automatic lathes and other machine tools, planers, and shapers - dozens of machines. From a Cleveland firm, we ordered cylinders, pistons, and crankshafts to our specifications, and engine castings to be worked in our own shop. The car was to be more powerful than the Buick." Shortly after that, operations came to a stand-still when Milbrath fell ill with pleurisy and the vehicle could not be completed. It has been suggested that Milbraith's ailment was actually a case of "diplomatic flu", which gave the McLaughlins an excuse to partner with Durant and build Buicks. Milbrath later founded the Wisconsin Motor Manufacturing Company.

When McLaughlin wired Durant for assistance in September 1907, the next day, Durant and William H. Little, another Buick executive, arrived in Oshawa. The two carriage men, Durant and McLaughlin, hammered out a fifteen-year contract under which McLaughlin would buy drive trains from Buick Motors. These cars were sold with the brand-name McLaughlin, although the name McLaughlin-Buick also appeared on some vehicles. This alliance with Buick Motor Company was controlled by an exchange of a large parcel of McLaughlin stock for a corresponding amount of Buick stock. Durant, also a partner in Durant-Dort, had a great deal in common with Sam McLaughlin, as both were part of the largest carriage companies in their respective countries.

In 1908, the McLaughlins manufactured 154 vehicles, the same year that Durant leveraged Buick to form General Motors. Durant borrowed heavily and bought other automotive businesses for his General Motors company, including Oldsmobile, Cadillac and Oakland (Pontiac), but vehicle sales collapsed, factories were closed for twelve months, and more. In 1910, Durant lost control of General Motors to the bankers that agreed to bail out the company. The McLaughlin shares that Durant held were placed in a trust company in New York, except for one share that Durant sold to Charles Williams Nash and one to Thomas Neal.

With Sam McLaughlin's financial help, Durant started a new business with racing driver Louis Chevrolet. Durant took control of Chevrolet and sold stock in a new business, Chevrolet Canada. In 1916, Durant regained control of General Motors, and in 1916, General Motors Corporation was formed with Sam McLaughlin as a director and vice-president. McLaughlin began manufacturing Chevrolet automobiles for Durant and General Motors. By 1914, McLaughlin had built about 1,100 of his cars.

=== General Motors of Canada ===
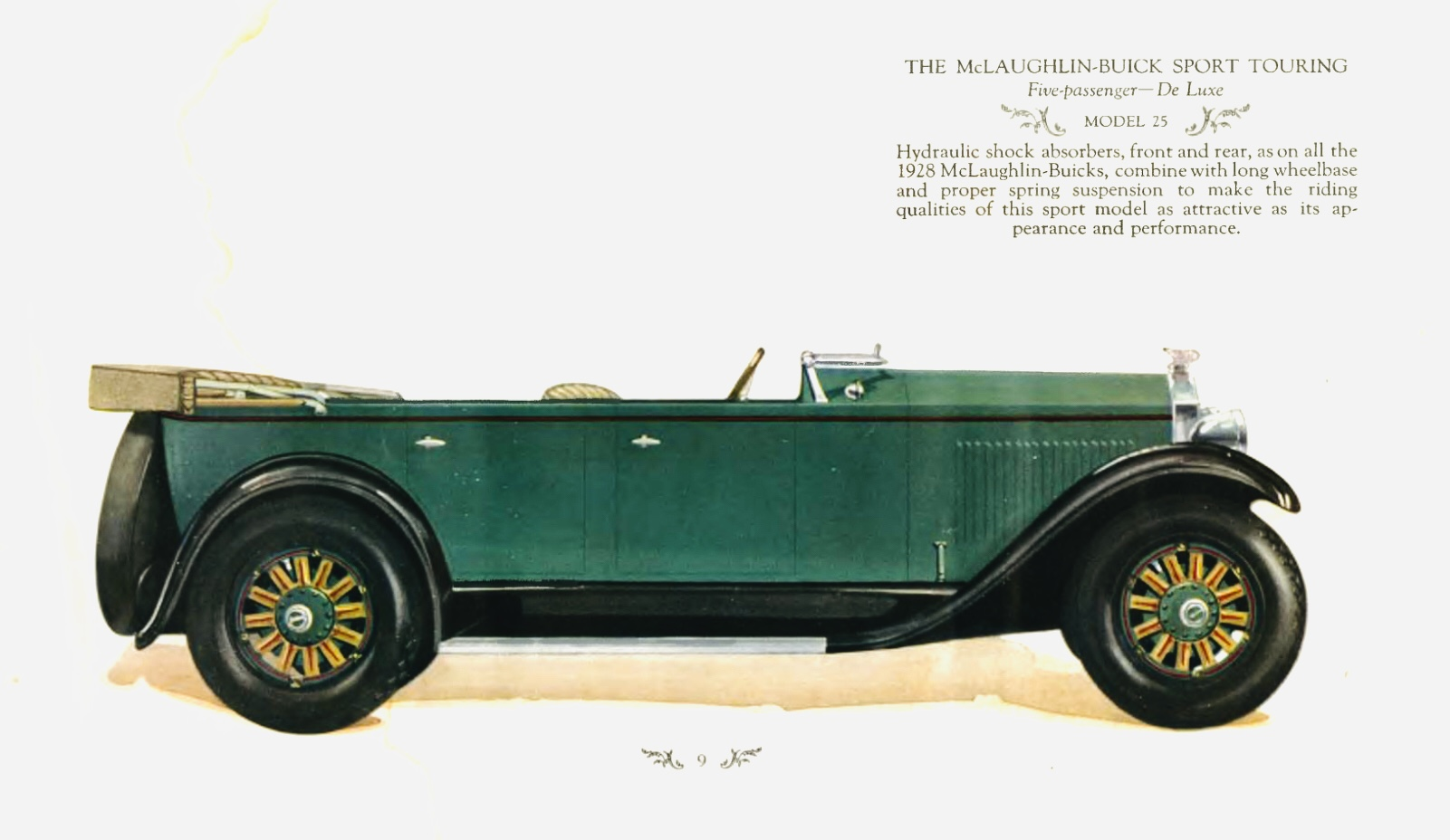
McLaughlin-Buick Model 25

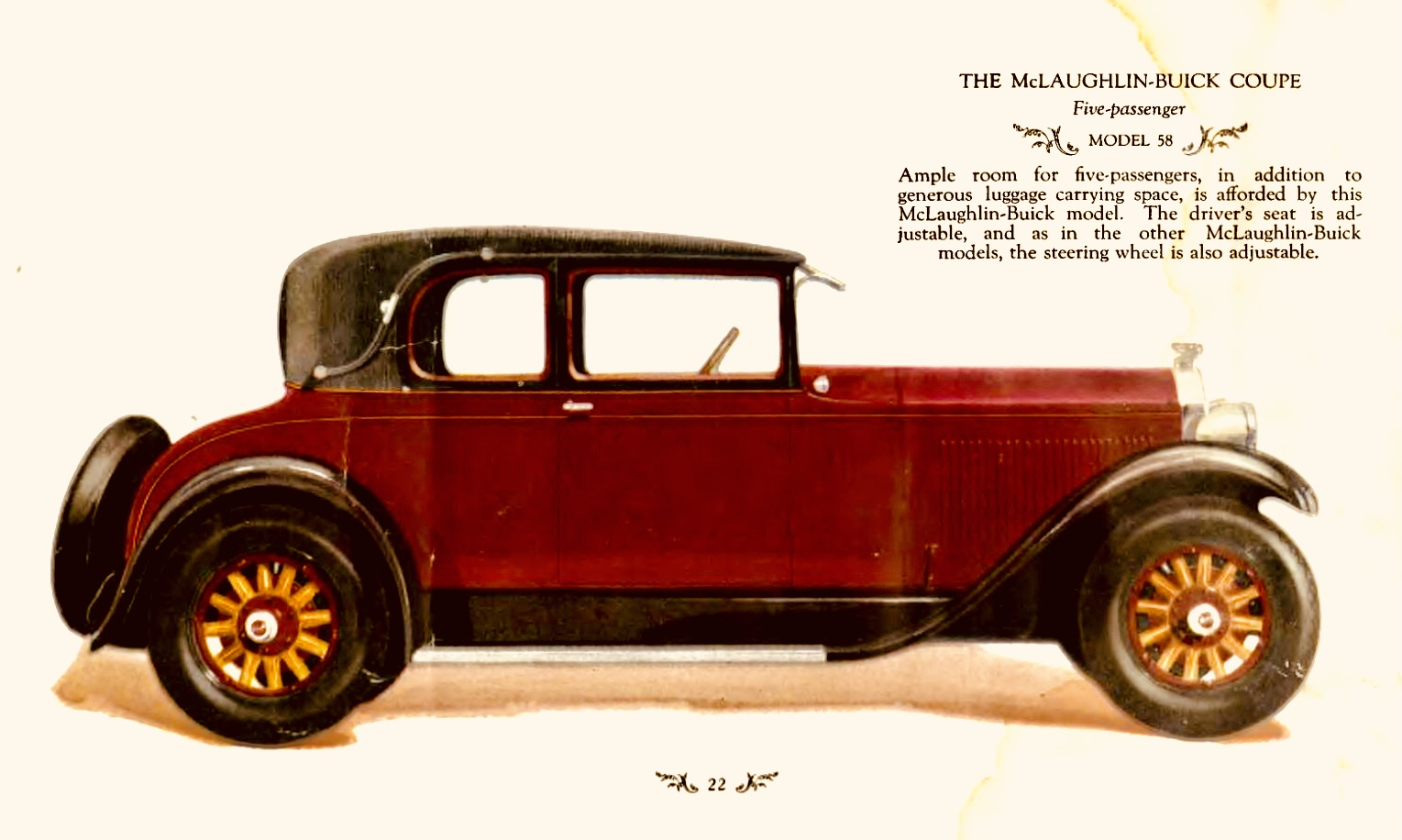
McLaughlin-Buick Model 58

General Motors of Canada was incorporated in 1918, when it merged McLaughlin and Chevrolet Canada. General Motors Canadian Corporation spent $10 million building a Walkerville, Ontario, plant with the sale of the Chevrolet stock and establishing Canadian products. In 1923, the name of the Canadian-bodied model was officially changed to McLaughlin-Buick, and cars with this name continued to be produced until 1942. Later, production was labelled Buick without the addition of McLaughlin or Canada.

Sam McLaughlin remained chairman of the board of General Motors of Canada, and vice-president and executive director of the parent company, until his death in 1972 at the age of 100.

== The automobiles ==
The first McLaughlin automobile was the 1907 Model F.

Until 1914, the cars were finished with the same paints and varnishes used on carriages. This meant each vehicle required up to fifteen coats of paint.

In 1927, the company produced two identical specially built touring cars for the Princes’ Royal Tour of Canada, one to be shipped ahead to the next city while the other was in use.

In 1936, a custom tailored McLaughlin-Buick Town Sedan was purchased by the Prince of Wales.

In 1936, the Dunsmuirs, a coal magnate family in Victoria, British Columbia, ordered three special-order 1936 Buick-McLaughlin Phaetons for three of their daughters. In 1937, the convertible phaeton bought for Elinor Dunsmuir was used to drive U.S. president Franklin Roosevelt around Victoria during his state visit. This is verified by photos appearing in the Times Colonist and the Victoria Times newspapers of 1 October 1937, because each of the Dunsmuir phaetons was unique.

Two custom built, dual-cowl McLaughlin-Buick Phaetons were built for the 1939 Royal Canadian Tour of George VI and Queen Elizabeth. One of these later carried Prince Charles and Diana, Princess of Wales, during their 1986 visit to Canada.

Year	Production	Model
1907		Model F
1908	154	Model F
1909	423	Model F
1910	847	Model F
1911	962	Model 4
1912	967	Model 28; Model 29
1913	881	Model B24 ; Model B25; Model 25
1914	1,098	Model B24 ; Model B25; Model 25; Model 3; Model B36; Model B37; Model 41; Model B55
1915	1,012	Model B24 ; Model B25 ; Model 25; Model B36; Model B37; Model B55
1916	2,859	Model B54; Model B55; Model D60
1917	3,418	Model D44;
1918	6,317	Model E50
Sum		

== Duties and other import taxes ==
Residents of other rapidly developing countries living under conditions not unlike the U.S. and Canada had a strong preference for well-engineered and robust American cars. The countries of the British Empire – England, India, South Africa, Australia, and others – gave preference by charging much lower import taxes on goods from another member of the Empire, such as Canada. Taxes were adjusted to the proportion of Canadian content. Canada made and supplied General Motors vehicles to those countries, fitting them with right-hand drive. During World War I, Britain erected high tariff barriers to protect their industry from America's low-priced mass-produced but good-quality cars. By 1923 Canada had the world's second-largest automotive industry. These exports fell to a trickle after World War II (Note: "Helped along by this proximity, Windsor – and Southern Ontario more generally – became the Canadian extension of Detroit with the help of two policies. First, there was a 35 percent National Policy tariff on cars entering Canada. This protectionist tax encouraged Canadian production by making Canadian goods less expensive than their foreign (mostly American-sourced) competitors. Second, since Canada was part of the British Empire, Canadian-made goods could be shipped to many countries in the Empire (later, the British Commonwealth) at a lower tariff rate than other countries, namely the United States." (quoted from The Canadian Encyclopedia, Automotive Industry accessed 8 July 2017)) because Canada was part of the dollar area and therefore set apart from the British Empire's sterling area. The British were struggling to repay U.S. War Loans and unwilling to allow their businesses unrestricted access to Canada's currency to buy Canadian cars.

== See also ==
- Canadian Automotive Museum
- List of automobile manufacturers
- McLaughlin Motor Car Showroom
- Reynolds-Alberta Museum

== Bibliography ==
- Heather Robertson, Driving Force, The McLaughlin Family and the Age of the Car, McClelland & Stewart, 1995, ISBN 0-7710-7556-1.
