= Shaar Hashamayim =

Shaar Hashamayim (also Shaar Hashomayim, Hebrew: שַׁעַר הַשָּׁמָיִם "Gate of Heaven") may refer to:

== Synagogues ==
=== Canada ===
- Congregation Shaar Hashomayim, Montreal
- Shaar Hashomayim Synagogue (Sudbury)

=== Egypt ===
- Sha'ar Hashamayim Synagogue (Cairo)

=== Gibraltar ===
- Great Synagogue (Gibraltar), known as Kahal Kadosh Sha'ar Hashamayim

=== Madeira ===
- Synagogue of Funchal, Funchal, Madeira, called Shaar Hashamayim

=== United Kingdom ===
- Bevis Marks Synagogue, London, also known as Kehal Shaar Hashamayim

=== United States ===
- Congregation Ahawath Chesed Shaar Hashomayim (Manhattan), also known as the Central Synagogue

=== Indonesia ===
- Sha'ar Hashamayim Synagogue (Tondano)

== Yeshivas ==
- Shaar Hashamayim Yeshiva, Jerusalem, a yeshiva specializing in the study of kabbalah

== See also ==
- Shaarey Shomayim (disambiguation)
