= Greater Sudbury =

City in Northern Ontario, Canada

Greater Sudbury Grand Sudbury (French) Sudbury
- City (single-tier)
- City of Greater Sudbury; Ville du Grand Sudbury (French)
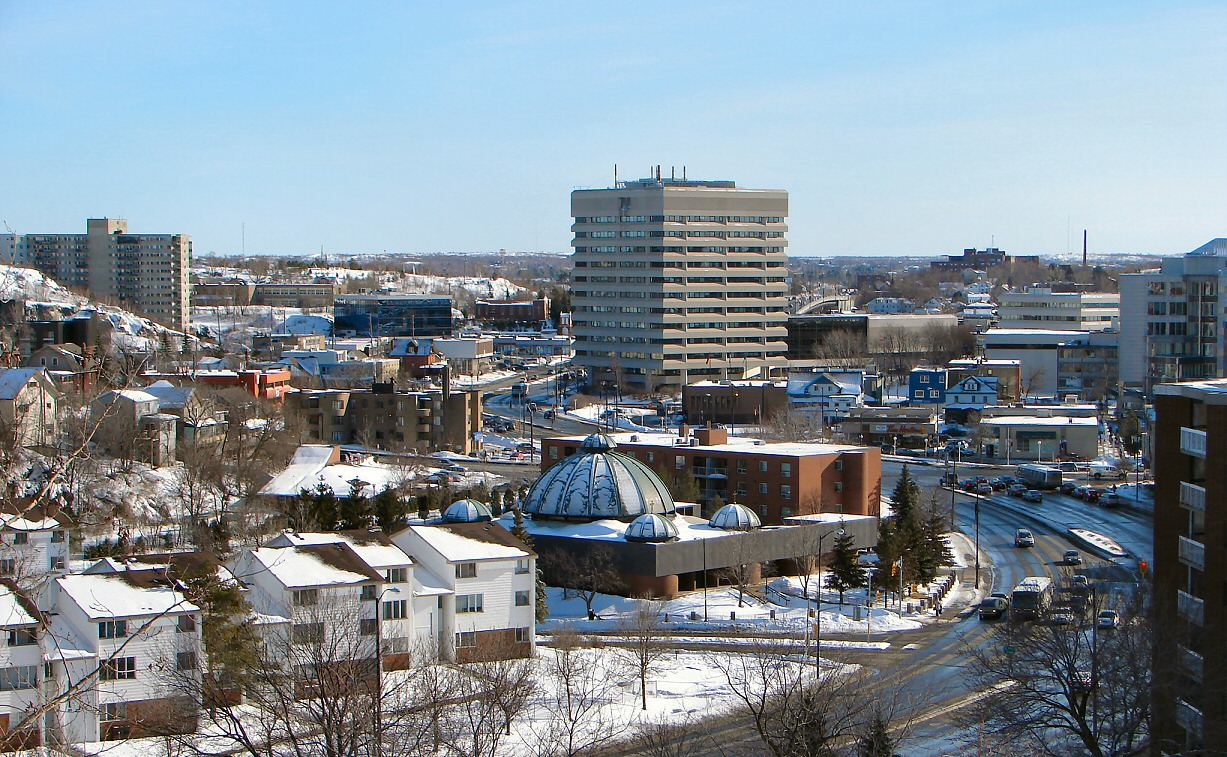
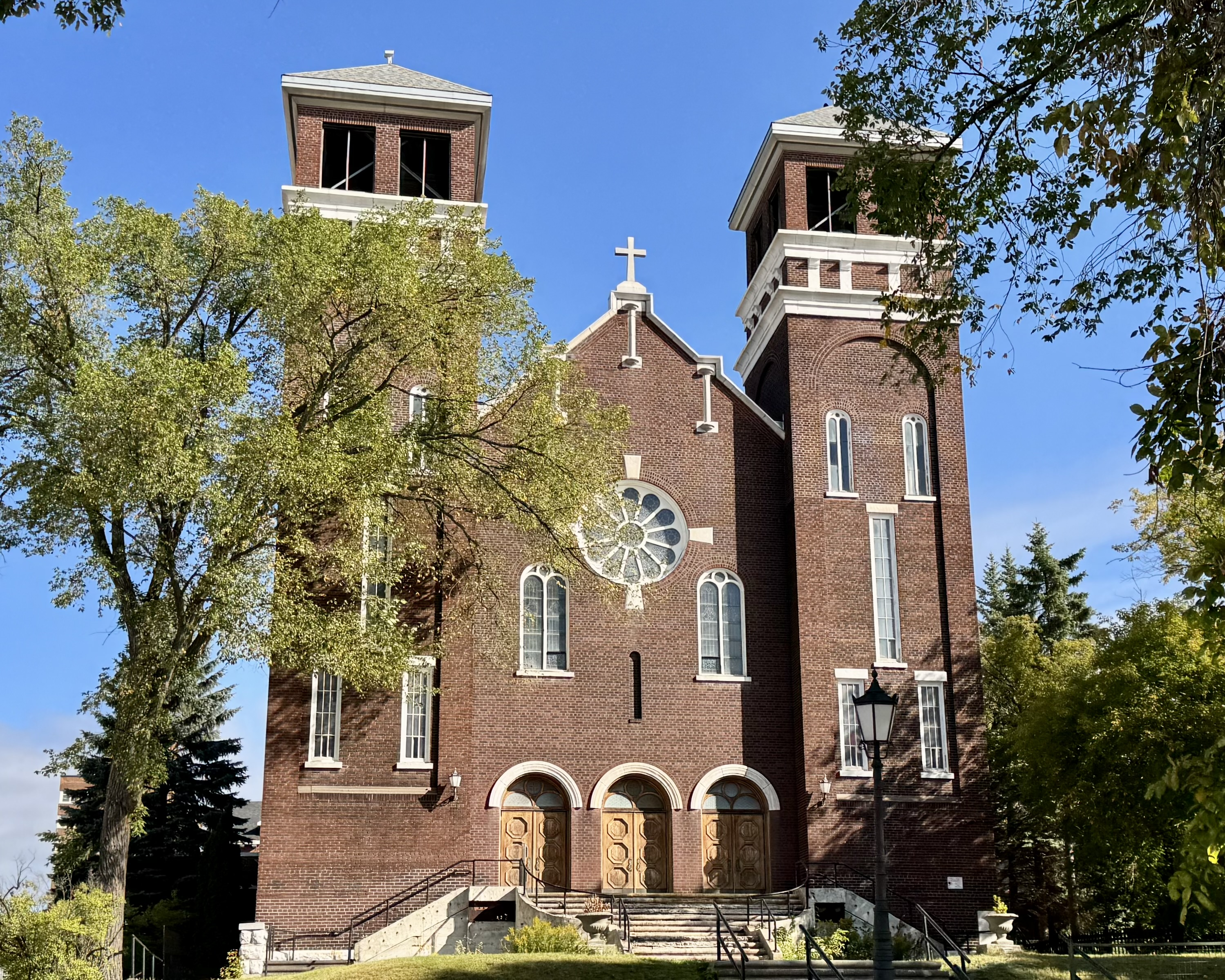
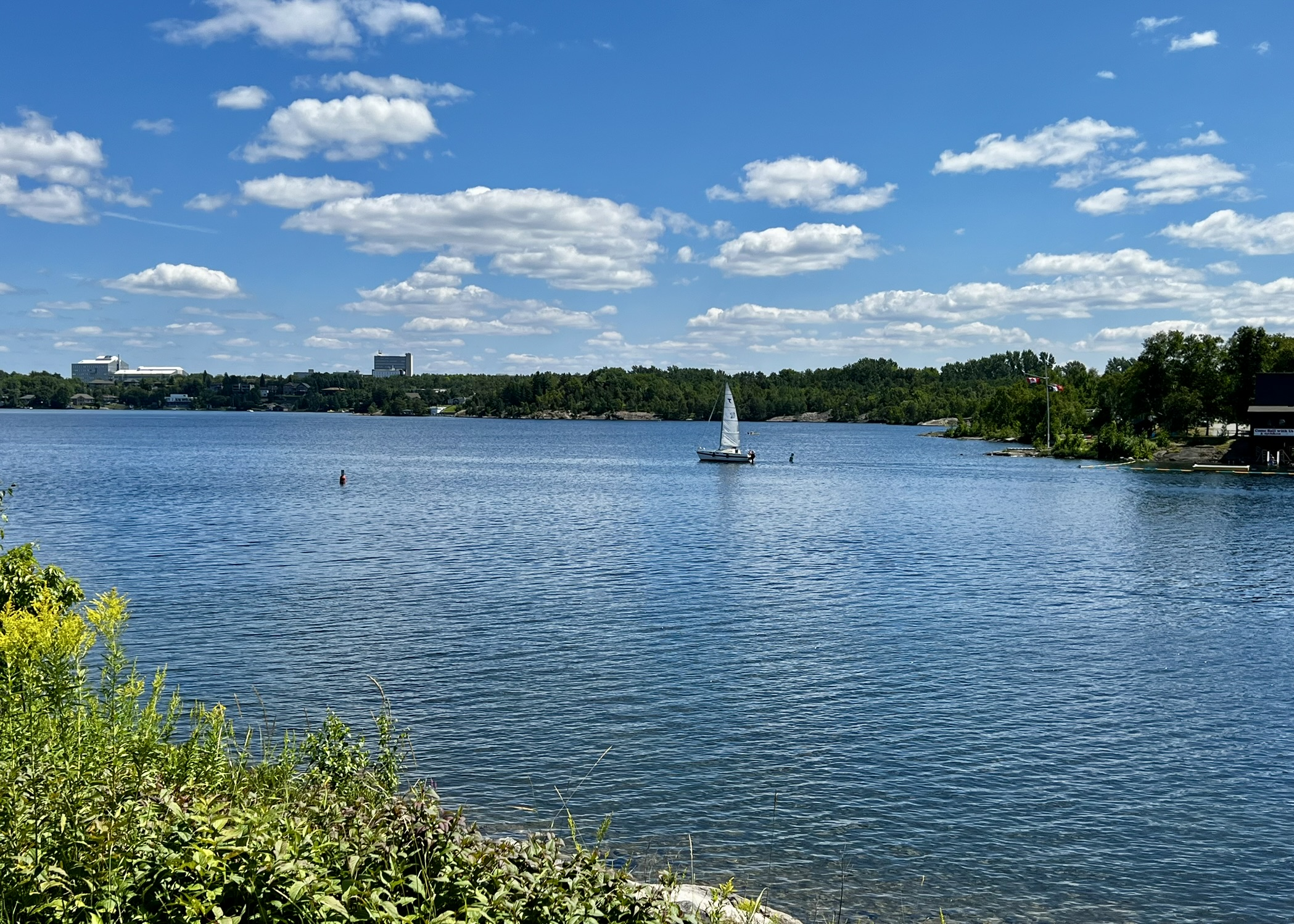
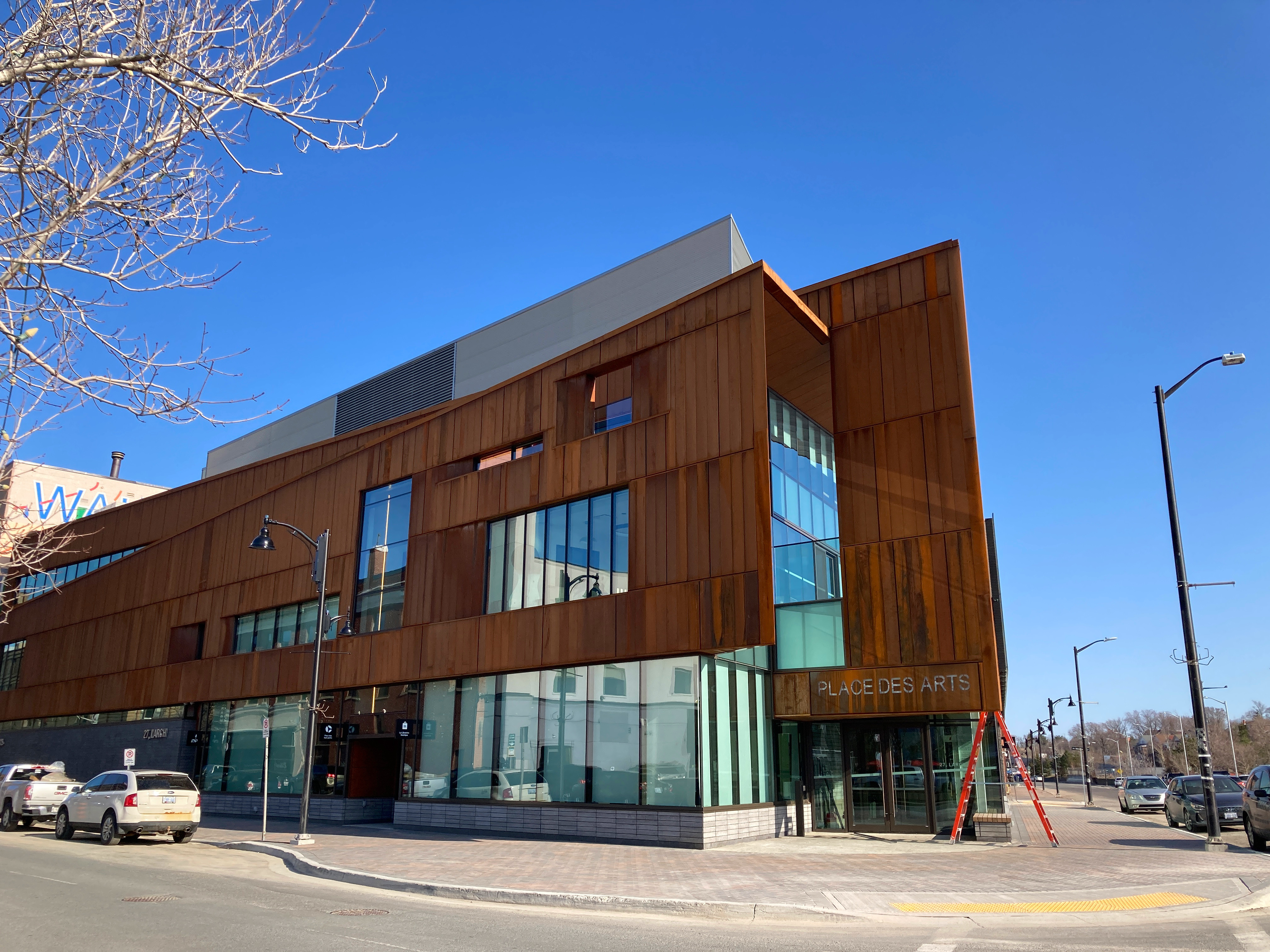
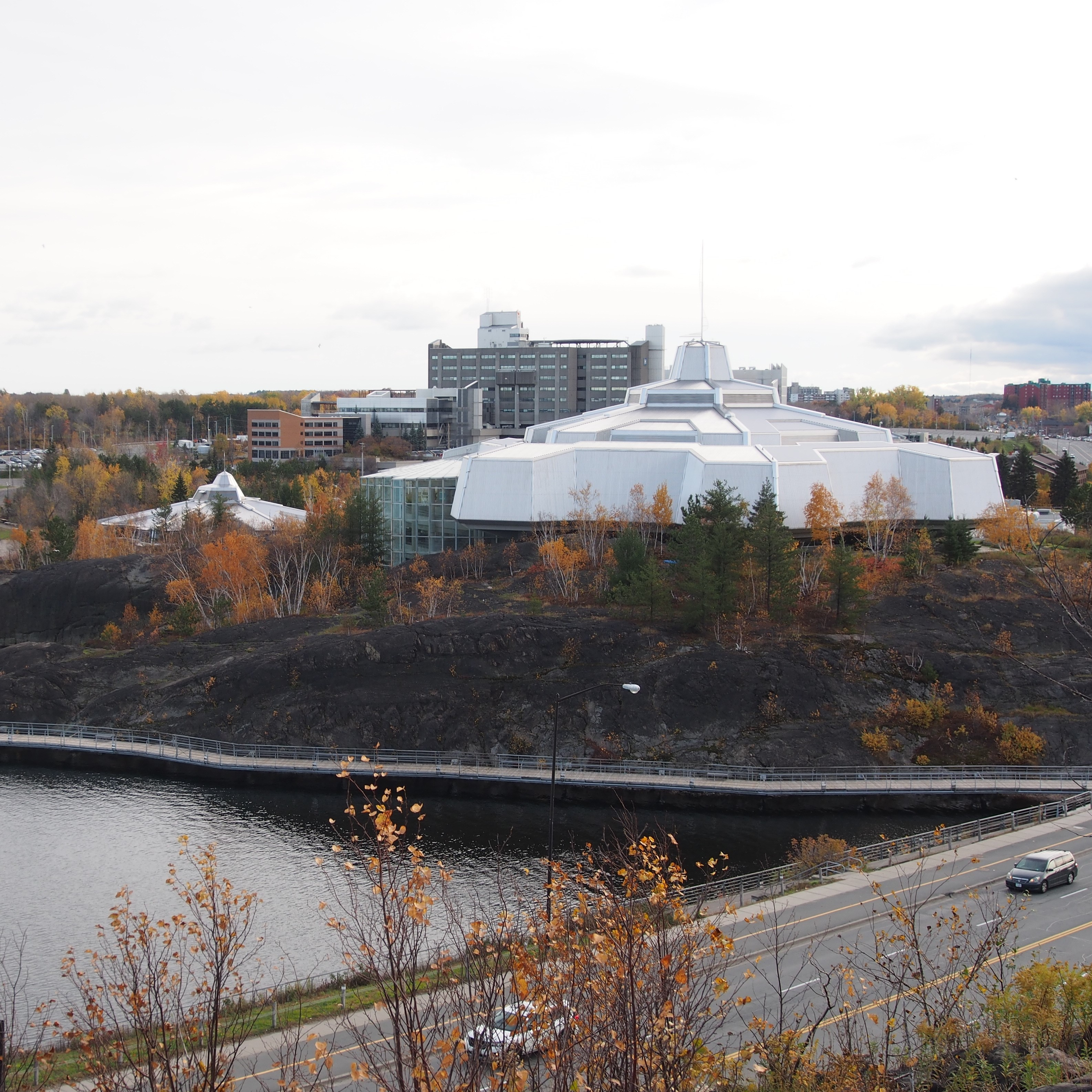
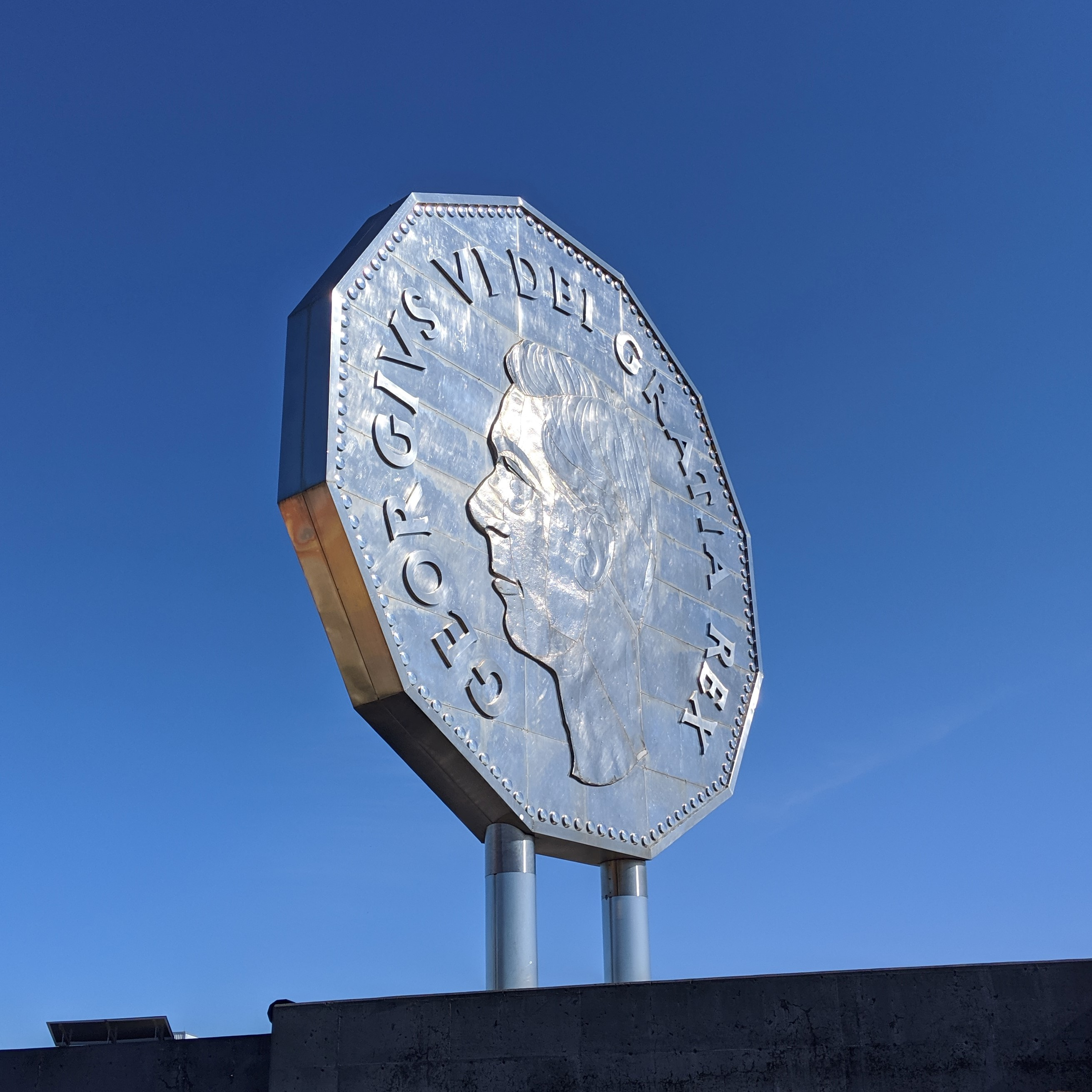
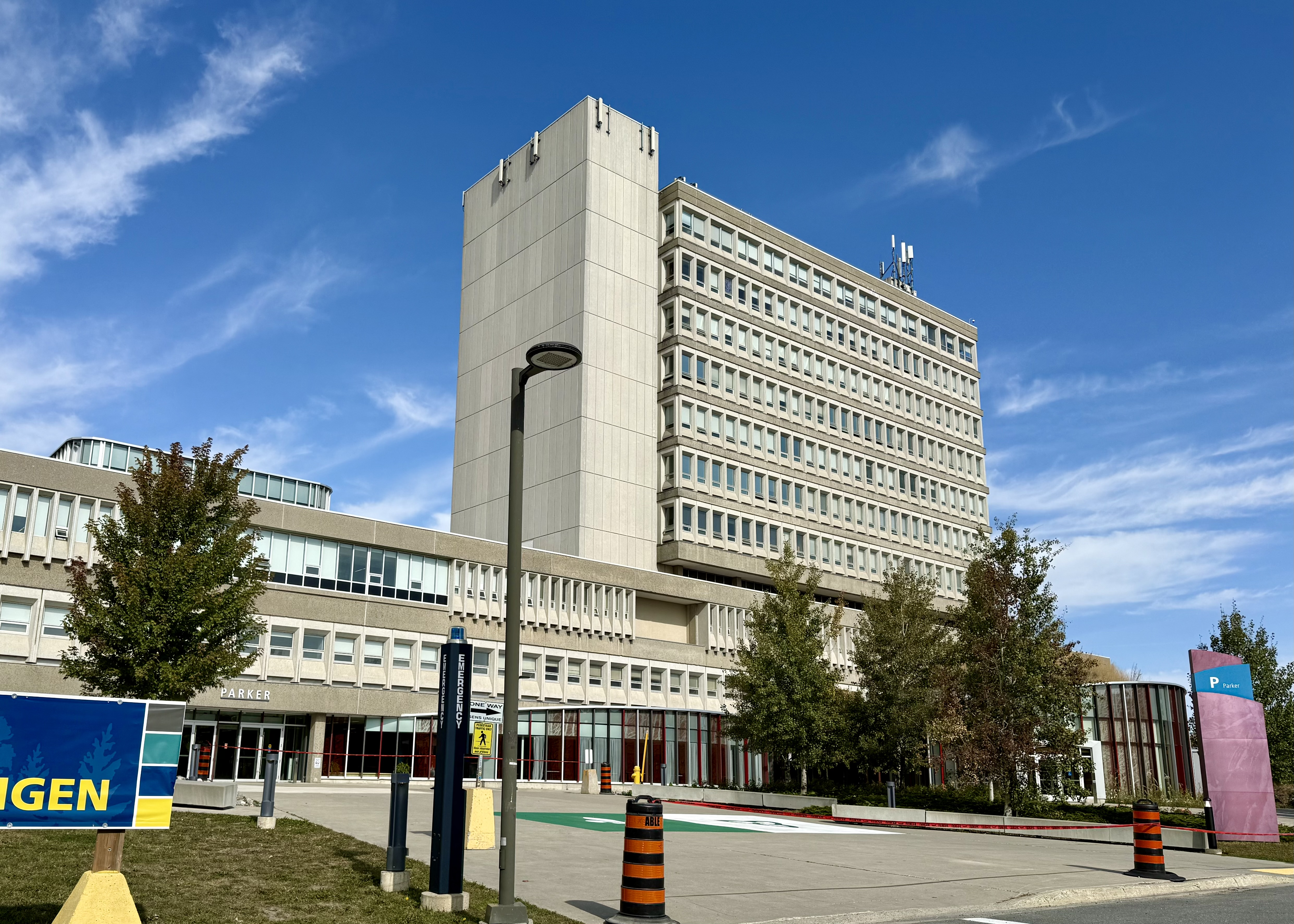
- Skyline of downtown Sudbury and Tom Davies Square Christ the King Church Ramsey Lake from Bell Park Place des Arts Science North Big Nickel Laurentian University

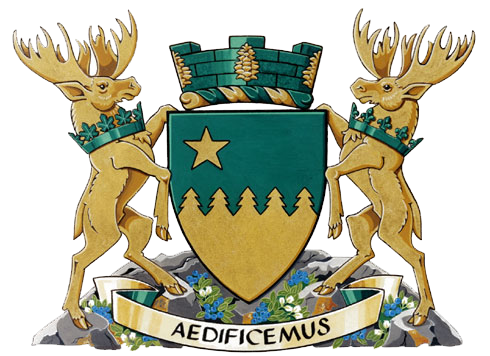
- Flag Coat of arms Logo
- Nicknames: "Nickel Capital", "Nickel City", "The Big Nickel", "City of Lakes" (colloquially)
- Motto(s): Aedificemus (Latin for "Let us build")
- Interactive map of Greater Sudbury
- Location of Greater Sudbury in Ontario Location of Greater Sudbury in Canada
- Coordinates: 46°34′40″N 81°04′10″W
- Country: Canada
- Province: Ontario
- Region: Northern Ontario
- Established: 1883; 143 years ago
- Incorporated (town): April 14, 1892; 134 years ago
- Incorporated (city): July 28, 1930; 96 years ago
- Amalgamated: January 1, 2001; 25 years ago
- Named for: Sudbury, Suffolk, England
- Communities: Sudbury; Capreol; Nickel Centre; Onaping Falls; Rayside-Balfour; Valley East; Walden

Government
  - Type: Single-tier municipality with a mayor–council system
  - Body: Greater Sudbury City Council
  - Mayor: Paul Lefebvre
  - MPs: Viviane Lapointe (Lib); Jim Belanger (Con)
  - MPPs: France Gélinas (NDP); Jamie West (NDP); John Vanthof (NDP)

Area
  - Land: 3,186.26 km^{2} (1,230.22 sq mi)
  - Urban: 75.79 km^{2} (29.26 sq mi)
  - Metro: 4,187.40 km^{2} (1,616.76 sq mi)
- Elevation: 347.5 m (1,140 ft)

Population (2021)
  - Total: 166,004 (29th)
  - Estimate (2024): 186,476
  - Density: 52.1/km^{2} (135/sq mi)
  - Urban: 92,093
  - Urban density: 1,215.1/km^{2} (3,147/sq mi)
  - Metro: 170,605 (24th)
  - Metro density: 40.7/km^{2} (105/sq mi)
- Demonym: Sudburian
- Time zone: UTC−05:00 (EST)
  - Summer (DST): UTC−04:00 (EDT)
- Forward sortation area: P3A to P3G, P3L, P3N, P3P, P3Y
- Area codes: 705, 249, and 683
- Highways: Highway 17 / TCH; Highway 69 / TCH; Highway 144; Highway 537
- GDP (Greater Sudbury CMA): CA$9.7 billion (2020)
- GDP per capita (Greater Sudbury CMA): CA$54,491 (2016)
- Website: www.greatersudbury.ca

Greater Sudbury (French: Grand Sudbury), also known as Sudbury, is the most populous city in Northern Ontario with a population around 166,004 in 2021. Greater Sudbury is the only single-tier municipality in Northern Ontario, the largest city in Ontario by area and the fifth largest in Canada. The city is separate from, but entirely surrounded by, the Sudbury District.

The Sudbury region was inhabited by the Ojibwe people of the Algonquin group of the Anishinaabe prior to the founding of Sudbury after the discovery of nickel and copper ore in 1883 during the construction of the Canadian Pacific Railway. Greater Sudbury was formed in 2001 by merging the cities and towns of the former Regional Municipality of Sudbury with several previously unincorporated townships. Being located inland, the local climate is extremely seasonal, with average January lows of around −18 °C (0 °F) and average July highs of 25 °C (77 °F).

The population resides in an urban core and many smaller communities scattered around 330 lakes and among hills of rock blackened by historic smelting activity. Sudbury was once a major lumber centre and a world leader in nickel mining. Mining and related industries dominated the economy for much of the 20th century. The two major mining companies which shaped the history of Sudbury were Inco, now Vale Limited, which employed more than 25% of the population by the 1970s, and Falconbridge, now Glencore. Sudbury has since expanded from its resource-based economy to emerge as the major retail, economic, health, and educational centre for Northeastern Ontario. Sudbury is also home to a large Franco-Ontarian population, which influences its arts and culture.

== Toponymy ==
James Worthington, the superintendent of construction on the Northern Ontario segment of the railway, selected the name Sudbury after Sudbury, Suffolk, in England, which was the hometown of his wife Caroline Hitchcock.

The city's official name was changed to Greater Sudbury in 2001, when it was amalgamated with its suburban towns into the current city, on the grounds of ensuring that the merger did not erase the longstanding community identities of the outlying towns. In everyday usage, however, the city is still more commonly referred to as just Sudbury.

== History ==
The original name for the region was N'Swakamok, which translates to 'where the three roads meet' in the Ojibwe language. The Sudbury region was home to Ojibwe people, an Anishinaabeg group, as early as 9,000 years ago following the retreat of the last continental ice sheet.

In 1850, local Ojibwe chiefs entered into an agreement with the British Crown to share a large tract of land, including what is now Sudbury, as part of the Robinson Huron Treaty. In exchange the Crown pledged to pay an annuity to First Nations people, which was originally set at $1.60 per treaty member and increased incrementally; its last increase was in 1874, leaving it fixed at $4.

French Jesuits were the first to establish a European settlement when they set up a mission called Sainte-Anne-des-Pins, just before the construction of the Canadian Pacific Railway in 1883. The Sainte-Anne-des-Pins church played a prominent role in the development of Franco-Ontarian culture in the region. Coincidentally, Ste-Anne is the patron saint of miners.

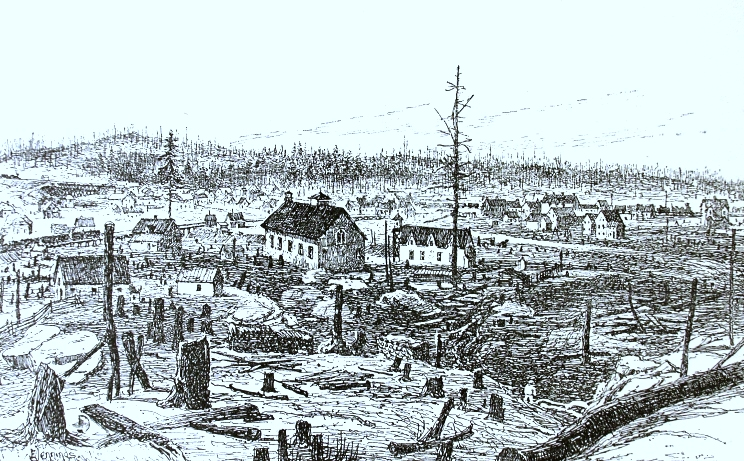
A Canadian Pacific Railway junction in Sudbury in 1888. Construction for the railway led to the discovery of high concentrations of nickel-copper ore at the edge of the Sudbury Basin.

During construction of the railway in 1883, blasting and excavation revealed high concentrations of nickel-copper ore at Murray Mine on the edge of the Sudbury Basin. This discovery brought the first waves of European settlers, who arrived not only to work at the mines, but also to build a service station for railway workers. Provincial land surveyor JL Morris laid out the intersection of Elm Street and Durham Street in 1884 as he planned the township.

Rich deposits of nickel sulphide ore were discovered in the Sudbury Basin geological formation. The construction of the railway allowed exploitation of these mineral resources and shipment of the commodities to markets and ports, as well as large-scale lumber extraction. In 1886 the Canadian Copper Company and others besides had been formed with the idea to exploit the region's natural wealth, and by 1888 the Copper Cliff smelter was born.

Sudbury was incorporated as a town in 1893, and its first mayor was Joseph Étienne aka Stephen Fournier.

The American inventor Thomas Edison visited the Sudbury area as a prospector in 1901. He is credited with the original discovery of the ore body at Falconbridge.

Mining began to replace lumber as the primary industry as the area's transportation network was improved to include trams. These enabled workers to live in one community and work in another. Sudbury's economy was dominated by the mining industry for much of the 20th century. Two major mining companies were created: Inco in 1902 and Falconbridge in 1928. They became two of the city's major employers and two of the world's leading producers of nickel.

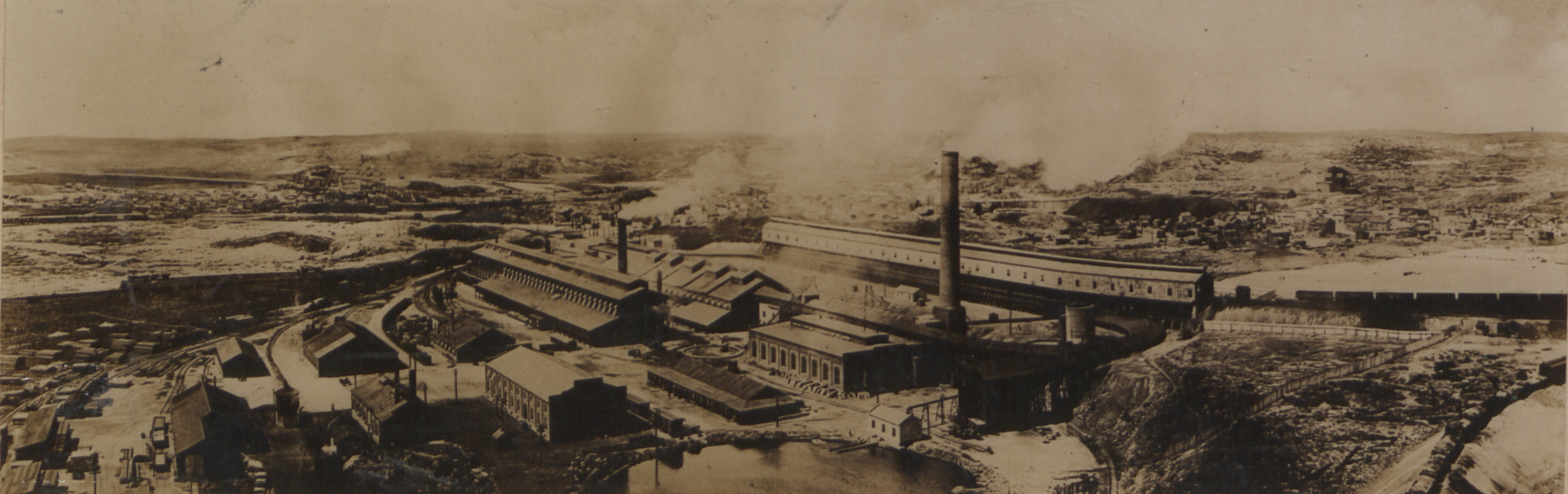
Smelting works of the Canadian Copper Company prior to World War I. Most of the nickel mined from Sudbury was used in the manufacturing of artillery during the war.

Through the decades that followed, Sudbury's economy went through boom and bust cycles as world demand for nickel fluctuated. Demand was high during the First World War, when Sudbury-mined nickel was used extensively in the manufacturing of artillery in Sheffield, England. It bottomed out when the war ended and then rose again in the mid-1920s as peacetime uses for nickel began to develop. The town was reincorporated as a city in 1930.

The city recovered from the Great Depression much more quickly than almost any other city in North America due to increased demand for nickel in the 1930s. Sudbury was the fastest-growing city and one of the wealthiest cities in Canada for most of the decade. Many of the city's social problems in the Great Depression era were not caused by unemployment or poverty, but due to the difficulty in keeping up with all of the new infrastructure demands created by rapid growth — for example, employed mineworkers sometimes ended up living in boarding houses or makeshift shanty towns, because demand for new housing was rising faster than supply. Between 1936 and 1941, the city was ordered into receivership by the Ontario Municipal Board. Another economic slowdown affected the city in 1937, but the city's fortunes rose again with wartime demands during the Second World War. The Frood Mine alone accounted for 40 percent of all the nickel used in Allied artillery production during the war. After the end of the war, Sudbury was in a good position to supply nickel to the United States government when it decided to stockpile non-Soviet supplies during the Cold War.

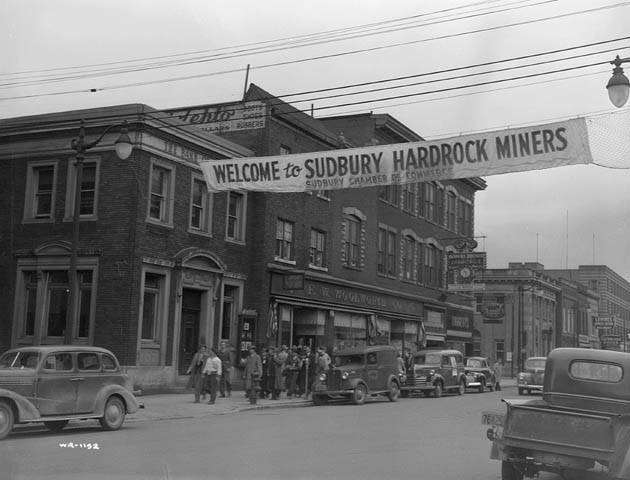
Banner welcoming hard rock miners into Sudbury. Nickel mines became vital to the war effort, with Frood Mine accounting for 40 percent of all nickel used in Allied artillery production.

The open coke beds used in the early to mid-20th century and logging for fuel resulted in a near-total loss of native vegetation in the area. Consequently, the terrain was made up of exposed rocky outcrops permanently stained charcoal black by the air pollution from the roasting yards. Acid rain added more staining, in a layer that penetrates up to 3 in (76 mm) into the once pink-grey granite.

In 1969 a white paper circulated about local Indigenous issues. The N'Swakamok Native Friendship Centre was founded in 1972 to address these concerns and provide support for the local Indigenous community.

The construction of the Inco Superstack in 1972 dispersed sulphuric acid through the air over a much wider area, reducing the acidity of local precipitation. This enabled the municipality, province and Inco and academics from Laurentian University to begin an environmental recovery program in the late 1970s, labelled a "regreening" effort. Lime was spread over the charred soil by hand and by aircraft. Seeds of wild grasses and other vegetation were also spread. As of 2010, 9.2 million new trees have been planted in the city. Vale has begun to rehabilitate the slag heaps that surrounds their smelter in the Copper Cliff area with the planting of grass and trees, as well as the use of biosolids to stabilize and regreen tailings areas.

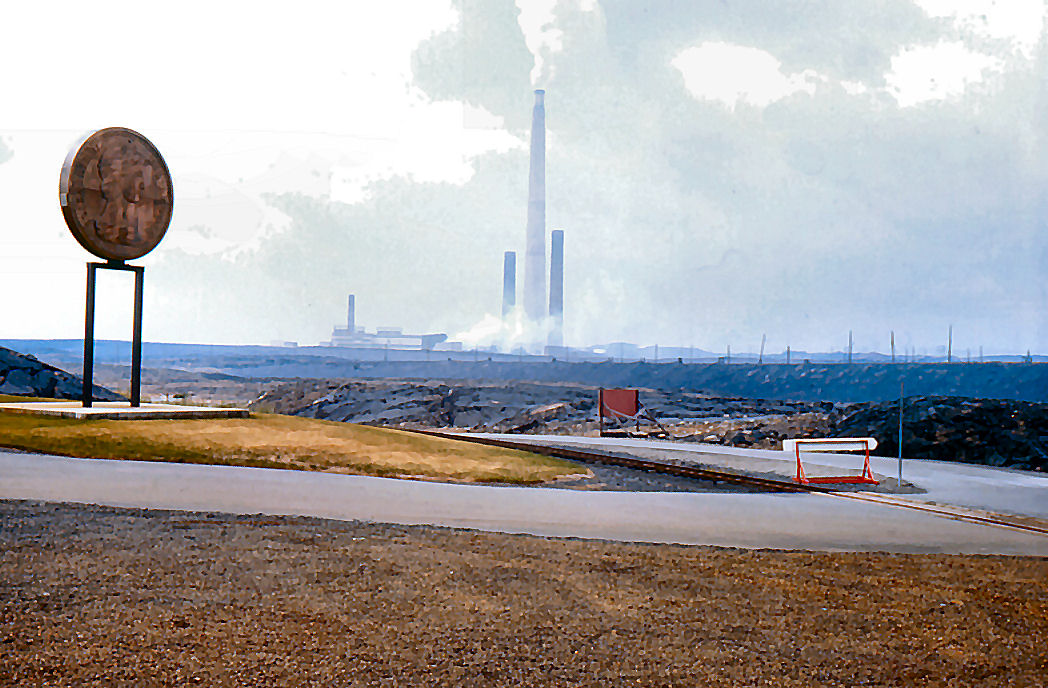
The Inco Superstack in 1976, four years after its completion. It was built to disperse sulphuric acid and reduce the acidity of local precipitation.

In 1978, the workers of Sudbury's largest mining corporation, Inco (now Vale), embarked on a strike over production and employment cutbacks. The strike, which lasted for nine months, badly damaged Sudbury's economy. The city government was spurred to launch a project to diversify the city's economy.

A unique and visionary project, Science North was inaugurated in 1984 with two-snowflake styled buildings connected by a tunnel through the Canadian shield where the Creighton fault intersects the shores of Lake Ramsey. The city tried to attract new employers and industries through the 1980s and 1990s with mixed success. The city of Sudbury and its suburban communities, which were reorganized into the Regional Municipality of Sudbury in 1973, was subsequently merged in 2001 into the single-tier city of Greater Sudbury.

In 2006, both of the city's major mining companies, Canadian-based Inco and Falconbridge, were taken over by new owners: Inco was acquired by the Brazilian company CVRD (now renamed Vale), while Falconbridge was purchased by the Swiss company Xstrata, which itself was purchased by Anglo–Swiss Glencore, forming Glencore Xstrata. Xstrata donated the historic Edison Building, the onetime head office of Falconbridge, to the city in 2007 to serve as the new home of the municipal archives. On September 19, 2008, a fire destroyed the historic Sudbury Steelworkers Hall on Frood Road. A strike at Vale's operations, which began on July 13, 2009, was tentatively resolved in July 2010. The 2009 strike lasted longer than the devastating 1978 strike, but had a much more modest effect on the city's economy than the earlier action—unlike in 1978, the local rate of unemployment declined slightly during the 2009 strike.

The ecology of the Sudbury region has recovered dramatically, helped by regreening programs and improved mining practices. The United Nations honoured twelve cities in the world, including Sudbury, with the Local Government Honours Award at the 1992 Earth Summit to recognise the city's community-based environmental reclamation strategies. By 2010, the regreening programs had successfully rehabilitated 3,350 ha (8,300 acres) of land in the city; however, approximately 30,000 ha (74,000 acres) of land have yet to be rehabilitated.

Various studies have confirmed that the provincial government's initial claims that the municipal amalgamation would result in cost savings and increased efficiencies have not borne out, and in fact administration of the amalgamated city costs significantly more than the prior regional government structure did.

== Geography ==
Sudbury has 330 lakes over 10 ha (25 acres) in size within the city limits. The most prominent is Lake Wanapitei, one of the largest lakes in the world that is completely contained within a municipality. Ramsey Lake, a few kilometres south of downtown Sudbury, held a similar status before the municipal amalgamation in 2001 brought Lake Wanapitei fully inside the city limits. Sudbury is divided into two main watersheds: to the east is the French River watershed which flows into Georgian Bay, and to the west is the Spanish River watershed, which flows into the North Channel of Lake Huron.

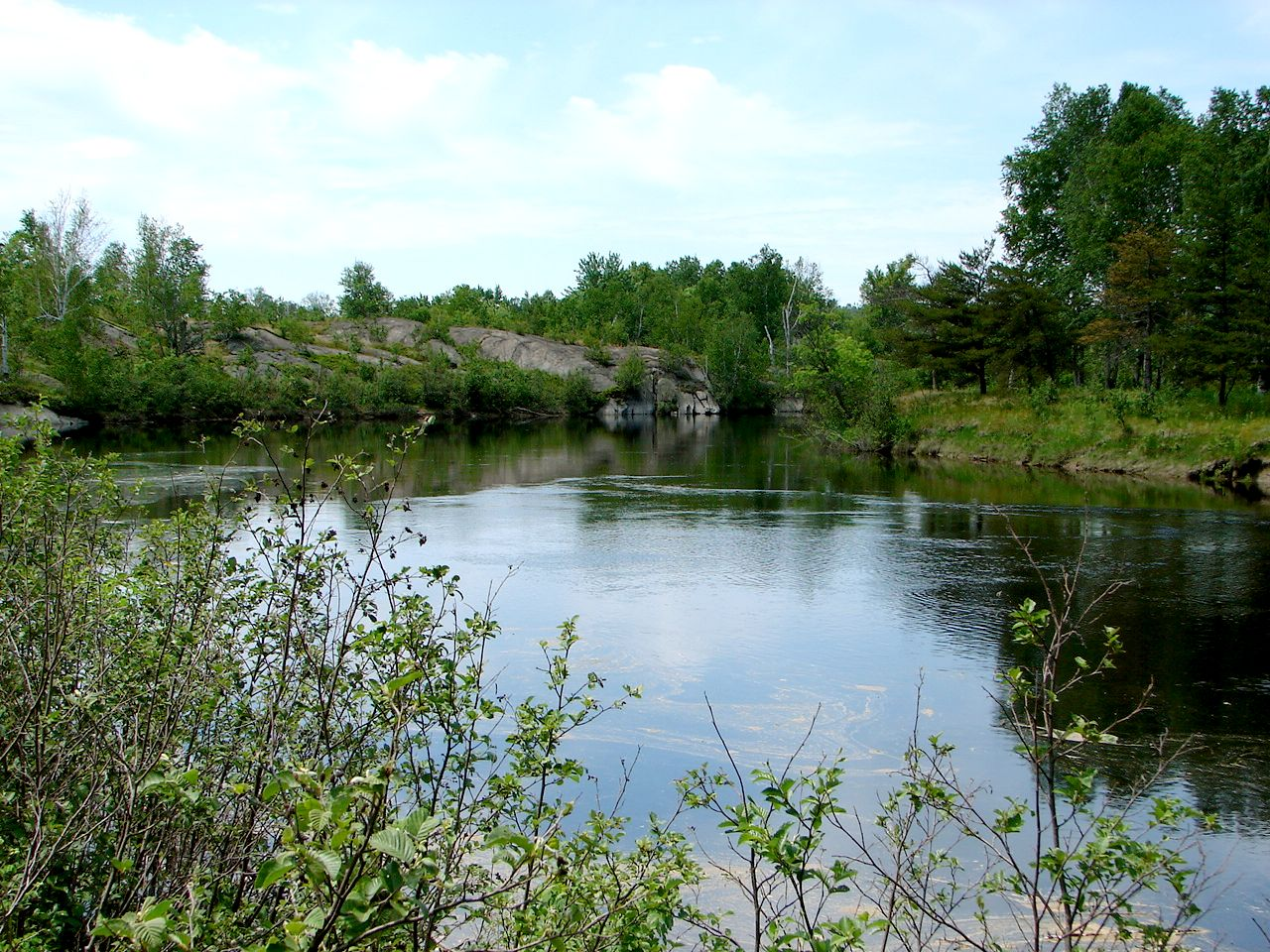
Wanapitei River in Sudbury. Located in the Great Lakes Basin, it is a tributary of the French River.

Sudbury is built around many small, rocky mountains with exposed igneous rock of the Canadian (Precambrian) Shield. The ore deposits in Sudbury are part of a large geological structure, known as the Sudbury Basin, which are the remnants of a nearly two billion-year-old impact crater; long thought to be the result of a meteorite collision, though more recent analysis has suggested that the crater may in fact have been created by a comet.

Sudbury's pentlandite, pyrite and pyrrhotite ores contain profitable amounts of many elements—primarily nickel and copper, but also platinum, palladium and other valuable metals.

Local smelting of the ore releases this sulphur into the atmosphere where it combines with water vapour to form sulphuric acid, contributing to acid rain. As a result, Sudbury has had a widespread reputation as a wasteland. In parts of the city, vegetation was devastated by acid rain and logging to provide fuel for early smelting techniques. To a lesser extent, the area's ecology was also impacted by lumber camps providing wood for the reconstruction of Chicago after the Great Chicago Fire of 1871. While other logging areas in Northeastern Ontario were also involved in that effort, the emergence of mining-related processes in the following decade made it significantly harder for new trees to grow to full maturity in the Sudbury area than elsewhere.

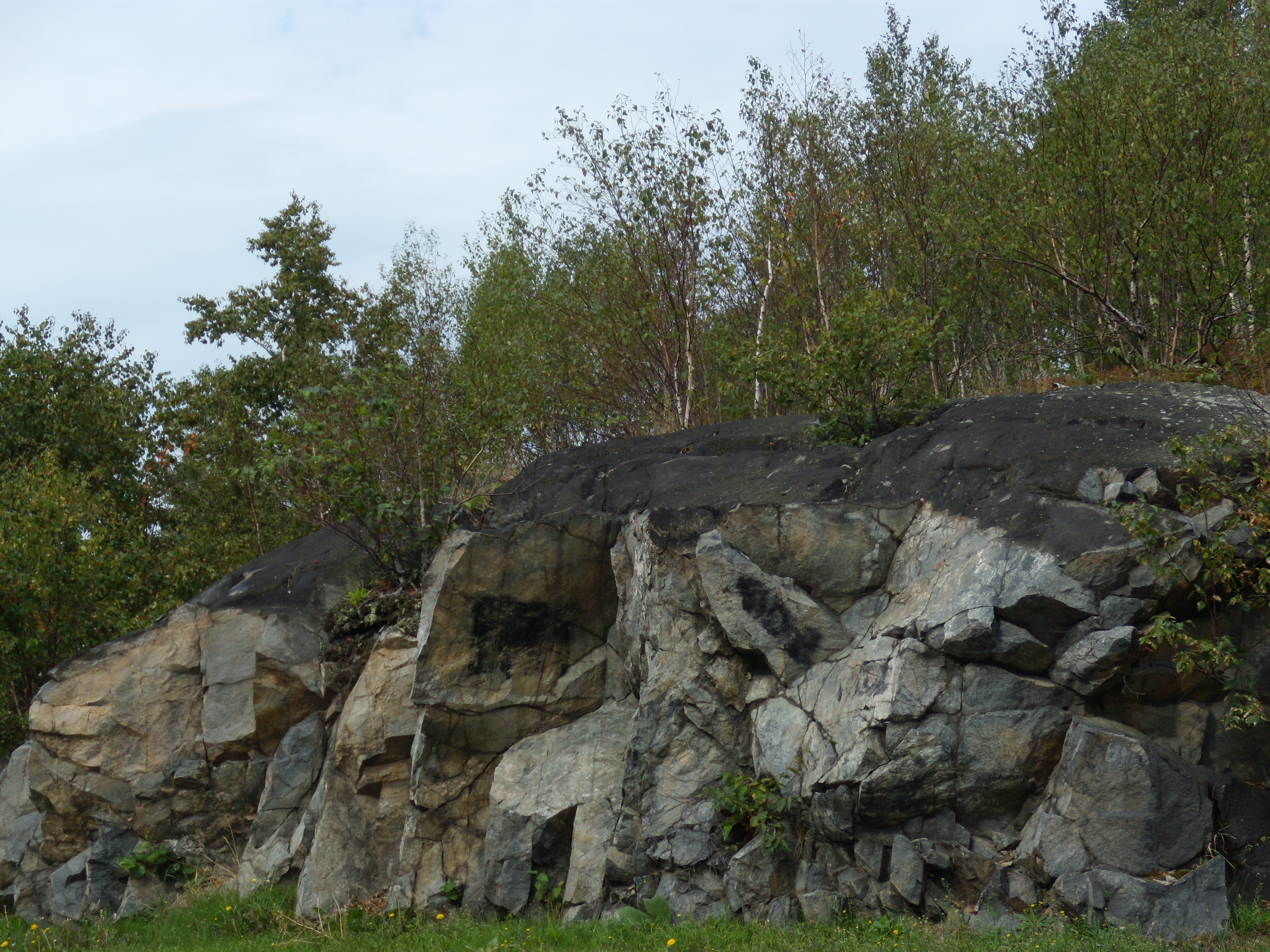
Erosion has resulted in bedrock being exposed in many parts of the city, many of which were charred to a pitted, dark black appearance.

The resulting erosion exposed bedrock in many parts of the city, which was charred in most places to a pitted, dark black appearance. There was not a complete lack of vegetation in the region, as paper birch and wild blueberry patches thrived in the acidic soils. During the Apollo crewed lunar exploration program, NASA astronauts trained in Sudbury to become familiar with impact breccia and shatter cones, rare rock formations produced by large meteorite impacts. However, the popular understanding is that they were visiting Sudbury because it purportedly resembled the lifeless surface of the Moon.

Conservation Sudbury operates a conservation area, the Lake Laurentian Conservation Area, in the city's south end. Other unique environmental projects in the city include the Fielding Bird Sanctuary, a protected area along Highway 17 near Lively that provides a managed natural habitat for birds, and a hiking and nature trail near Coniston, which is named in honour of scientist Jane Goodall.

Six provincial parks (Chiniguchi River, Daisy Lake Uplands, Fairbank, Killarney Lakelands and Headwaters, Wanapitei and Windy Lake) and two provincial conservation reserves (MacLennan Esker Forest and Tilton Forest) are also located partially or entirely within the city boundaries.

=== Climate ===
Greater Sudbury has a humid continental climate (Köppen climate classification: Dfb). This region has warm and often humid summers with occasional short lasting periods of hot weather, with long, cold and snowy winters. It is situated north of the Great Lakes, making it prone to arctic air masses. Monthly precipitation is equal year round, with snow cover expected for up to six months of the year. Although extreme weather events are rare, one of the worst tornadoes in Canadian history struck the city and its suburbs on August 20, 1970, killing six people, injuring two hundred, and causing more than C$17 million (equivalent to $138 million in 2025) in damages.

The highest temperature ever recorded in Greater Sudbury was 41.1 °C (106.0 °F) on July 13, 1936. The lowest temperature ever recorded was −48.3 °C (−54.9 °F) on December 29, 1933.

Climate data for Sudbury Airport, 1991−2020 normals, extremes 1887−present (Note: Extreme high and low temperatures in the table are from Sudbury (June 1887 to July 1930), Coniston (August 1930 to September 1947), Sudbury (October 1947 to January 1954), and Sudbury Airport (February 1954 to present).)
Month	Jan	Feb	Mar	Apr	May	Jun	Jul	Aug	Sep	Oct	Nov	Dec	Year
Record high humidex	7.2	10.0	27.9	30.7	39.4	41.4	43.5	49.2	38.7	34.3	21.7	17.7	49.2
Record high °C (°F)	10.0 (50.0)	9.4 (48.9)	25.9 (78.6)	29.8 (85.6)	35.6 (96.1)	35.7 (96.3)	41.1 (106.0)	36.7 (98.1)	34.4 (93.9)	27.8 (82.0)	20.1 (68.2)	15.6 (60.1)	41.1 (106.0)
Mean maximum °C (°F)	3.4 (38.1)	3.7 (38.7)	10.7 (51.3)	20.0 (68.0)	27.9 (82.2)	30.5 (86.9)	31.1 (88.0)	30.3 (86.5)	27.1 (80.8)	21.4 (70.5)	12.5 (54.5)	5.8 (42.4)	32.3 (90.1)
Mean daily maximum °C (°F)	−7.8 (18.0)	−5.9 (21.4)	0.5 (32.9)	8.6 (47.5)	17.4 (63.3)	22.6 (72.7)	25.0 (77.0)	23.5 (74.3)	18.6 (65.5)	10.6 (51.1)	2.9 (37.2)	−3.9 (25.0)	9.3 (48.7)
Daily mean °C (°F)	−12.7 (9.1)	−11.1 (12.0)	−4.9 (23.2)	3.3 (37.9)	11.4 (52.5)	16.8 (62.2)	19.1 (66.4)	18.0 (64.4)	13.3 (55.9)	6.2 (43.2)	−0.8 (30.6)	−7.8 (18.0)	4.3 (39.7)
Mean daily minimum °C (°F)	−17.5 (0.5)	−16.3 (2.7)	−10.2 (13.6)	−2.0 (28.4)	5.3 (41.5)	11.0 (51.8)	13.4 (56.1)	12.5 (54.5)	8.1 (46.6)	1.9 (35.4)	−4.4 (24.1)	−11.7 (10.9)	−0.8 (30.6)
Mean minimum °C (°F)	−30.4 (−22.7)	−28.0 (−18.4)	−23.1 (−9.6)	−11.1 (12.0)	−2.0 (28.4)	3.4 (38.1)	7.4 (45.3)	6.2 (43.2)	0.0 (32.0)	−5.4 (22.3)	−14.7 (5.5)	−25.1 (−13.2)	−32.2 (−26.0)
Record low °C (°F)	−42.8 (−45.0)	−42.8 (−45.0)	−41.1 (−42.0)	−27.8 (−18.0)	−12.8 (9.0)	−1.6 (29.1)	−0.6 (30.9)	−1.1 (30.0)	−5.7 (21.7)	−13.9 (7.0)	−31.7 (−25.1)	−48.3 (−54.9)	−48.3 (−54.9)
Record low wind chill	−53.1	−50.0	−43.2	−32.4	−15.2	−8.6	0.0	−5.0	−9.2	−16.6	−36.3	−51.0	−53.1
Average precipitation mm (inches)	66.8 (2.63)	51.1 (2.01)	58.3 (2.30)	67.8 (2.67)	79.2 (3.12)	77.4 (3.05)	84.0 (3.31)	89.9 (3.54)	103.2 (4.06)	93.8 (3.69)	74.5 (2.93)	65.9 (2.59)	911.9 (35.90)
Average rainfall mm (inches)	14.2 (0.56)	7.6 (0.30)	27.5 (1.08)	52.3 (2.06)	76.9 (3.03)	77.0 (3.03)	84.0 (3.31)	89.9 (3.54)	103.1 (4.06)	87.1 (3.43)	49.0 (1.93)	16.4 (0.65)	685.0 (26.97)
Average snowfall cm (inches)	63.6 (25.0)	51.9 (20.4)	33.1 (13.0)	16.1 (6.3)	2.3 (0.9)	0.0 (0.0)	0.0 (0.0)	0.0 (0.0)	0.1 (0.0)	6.5 (2.6)	30.2 (11.9)	59.6 (23.5)	263.4 (103.7)
Average precipitation days (≥ 0.2 mm)	18.3	14.2	11.4	11.0	12.4	12.4	12.8	12.5	13.4	15.5	16.0	18.1	168.0
Average rainy days (≥ 0.2 mm)	3.0	2.0	4.4	8.3	12.0	12.5	12.8	12.5	13.4	14.4	8.7	4.6	108.7
Average snowy days (≥ 0.2 cm)	17.6	14.2	9.3	4.8	0.81	0.04	0.0	0.0	0.13	3.0	10.2	15.8	75.9
Average relative humidity (%) (at 15:00)	71.8	64.4	55.6	49.9	47.7	51.4	53.4	55.9	60.3	65.5	73.3	76.1	60.5
Average dew point °C (°F)	−15.4 (4.3)	−14.7 (5.5)	−10.3 (13.5)	−4.3 (24.3)	3.3 (37.9)	9.9 (49.8)	12.9 (55.2)	12.7 (54.9)	9.2 (48.6)	2.6 (36.7)	−3.6 (25.5)	−10.2 (13.6)	−0.6 (30.9)
Mean monthly sunshine hours	86.3	118.2	161.0	195.6	228.4	246.9	274.7	245.2	162.1	121.4	69.8	63.5	1,973.2
Percentage possible sunshine	30.9	40.7	43.7	48.1	49.1	52.2	57.4	55.8	42.9	35.8	24.6	23.7	42.1
Source 1: Environment Canada (sun 1981–2010)
Source 2: weatherstats.ca (for dewpoint and monthly&yearly average absolute maximum&minimum temperature)

=== Communities ===
The city of Sudbury and its suburban communities were reorganized into the Regional Municipality of Sudbury in 1973, which was subsequently merged in 2001 into the single-tier city of Greater Sudbury.

In common usage, the city's urban core is still generally referred to as Sudbury, while the outlying former towns are still referred to by their old names and continue in some respects to maintain their own distinct community identities despite their lack of political independence. Each of the seven former municipalities in turn encompasses numerous smaller neighbourhoods. Amalgamated cities (2001 Canadian census population) include: Sudbury (85,354) and Valley East (22,374). Towns (2001 Canadian census population) include: Rayside-Balfour (15,046), Nickel Centre (12,672), Walden (10,101), Onaping Falls (4,887), and Capreol (3,486). The Wanup area, formerly an unincorporated settlement outside of Sudbury's old city limits, was also annexed into the city in 2001, along with a large wilderness area on the northeastern shore of Lake Wanapitei.

== Demographics ==
In the 2021 Census of Population conducted by Statistics Canada, Greater Sudbury had a population of 166,004 living in 71,476 of its 75,967 total private dwellings, a change of 2.8% from its 2016 population of 161,531. With a land area of 3,186.26 km^{2} (1,230.22 sq mi), it had a population density of 52.1/km^{2} (134.9/sq mi) in 2021.

At the census metropolitan area (CMA) level in the 2021 census, the Greater Sudbury CMA comprised the city, the Wahnapitae First Nation and the outlying town of Markstay-Warren, and had a population of 170,605 living in 73,387 of its 78,225 total private dwellings, a change of 2.8% from its 2016 population of 165,958. With a land area of 4,187.4 km^{2} (1,616.8 sq mi), it had a population density of 40.7/km^{2} (105.5/sq mi) in 2021.

In 2011, the population of Sudbury was less educated than the Canadian average, with 17.2% of the population holding a university degree (compared to 23.3% nationally) and 18.1% with no certificate, diploma or degree (compared to 17.3% nationally).

In 2021, the median age was 43.2 years, slightly higher than the provincial average of 41.6 years.

Historical census populations – Sudbury

Year	Pop.	±%
1901	2,027	—
1911	4,150	+104.7%
1921	8,621	+107.7%
1931	18,518	+114.8%
1941	31,888	+72.2%
1951	42,410	+33.0%

Year	Pop.	±%
1961	80,120	+88.9%
1971	90,535	+13.0%
1981	91,829	+1.4%
1991	92,884	+1.1%
1996	92,059	−0.9%
2001	85,354	−7.3%

Source: Statistics Canada

Historical census populations – Greater Sudbury

Year	Pop.	±%
2001	155,219	—
2006	157,857	+1.7%
2011	160,274	+1.5%

Year	Pop.	±%
2016	161,531	+0.8%
2021	166,004	+2.8%

Source: Statistics Canada

=== Ethnicity ===
Greater Sudbury has few visible minorities with 6.6% reporting visible minority status on the 2021 census compared to the national average of 26.5%, but a much higher percentage of Indigenous Canadians (11%) than the national average of 5%. Visible minorities representing over 0.5% of the population include: 2.5% Black, 1.9% South Asian, and 0.6% Chinese.

Reported Ethnic Origins, 2016 (Note: Note that a person may report more than one ethnic origin.)

Ethnic origin	Population	Percent
Canadian	72,315	45.6
French	59,885	37.7
English	31,790	20.0
Irish	30,345	19.1
Scottish	24,990	15.8
Italian	13,420	8.5

Ethnic origin	Population	Percent
German	12,905	8.1
First Nations	10,985	6.9
Métis	8,995	5.7
Ukrainian	7,390	4.7
Finnish	7,365	4.6
Polish	4,815	3.0

Panethnic groups in the City of Greater Sudbury (2001−2021)
Panethnic group	2021		2016		2011		2006		2001	
Panethnic group	Pop.	%	Pop.	%	Pop.	%	Pop.	%	Pop.	%
European (Note: Statistic includes all persons that did not make up part of a visible minority or an indigenous identity.)	134,275	82.36%	137,715	86.8%	140,605	89.12%	143,125	91.75%	143,365	93.39%
Indigenous	17,930	11%	14,960	9.43%	12,960	8.21%	9,590	6.15%	7,020	4.57%
African	4,030	2.47%	1,455	0.92%	935	0.59%	1,095	0.7%	1,075	0.7%
South Asian	3,105	1.9%	1,465	0.92%	630	0.4%	575	0.37%	535	0.35%
East Asian (Note: Statistic includes total responses of "Chinese", "Korean", and "Japanese" under visible minority section on census.)	1,230	0.75%	1,165	0.73%	995	0.63%	755	0.48%	830	0.54%
Southeast Asian (Note: Statistic includes total responses of "Filipino" and "Southeast Asian" under visible minority section on census.)	840	0.52%	680	0.43%	520	0.33%	295	0.19%	190	0.12%
Latin American	705	0.43%	275	0.17%	290	0.18%	180	0.12%	220	0.14%
Middle Eastern (Note: Statistic includes total responses of "West Asian" and "Arab" under visible minority section on census.)	485	0.3%	725	0.46%	545	0.35%	170	0.11%	180	0.12%
Other (Note: Statistic includes total responses of "Visible minority, n.i.e." and "Multiple visible minorities" under visible minority section on census.)	435	0.27%	235	0.15%	290	0.18%	200	0.13%	110	0.07%
Total responses	163,030	98.21%	158,665	98.23%	157,765	98.43%	155,995	98.82%	153,510	98.9%
Total population	166,004	100%	161,531	100%	160,274	100%	157,857	100%	155,219	100%

- Note: Totals greater than 100% due to multiple origin responses.

=== Religion ===
Religions in Sudbury
Religion	Percent
Catholic Christian	46.8%
No Religion/Secular	33.2%
Protestant Christians	10.4%
Christian (not otherwise specified)	3.9%
Others	3.2%
Other Christian/Christian Related Tradition	2.6%
Census Profile 2021

Largest non-Christian religion in Greater Sudbury CMA by census tract based on the 2021 census

According to the 2021 census profile, the residents of Greater Sudbury are predominantly Christian. Around 64% (down from 81% in 2011) of the population belongs to Christian denominations with Catholics composing the largest single group (47%, down from 59% in 2011). Those with no religious affiliation accounted for 33% (up from 18% in 2011) of the population. Other religions such as Islam, Judaism, and Hinduism constitute around 3% of the population in total, up from 1% in 2011.

=== Language ===
Sudbury is a bilingual city with a large francophone population, with 37.5% of Sudburians able to speak French and 22.6% having French as mother tongue. 83.8% of the population use English as the language spoken most often at home, followed by French at 10.6%, which is significantly higher than the Ontario average of 1.8%.

== Economy ==
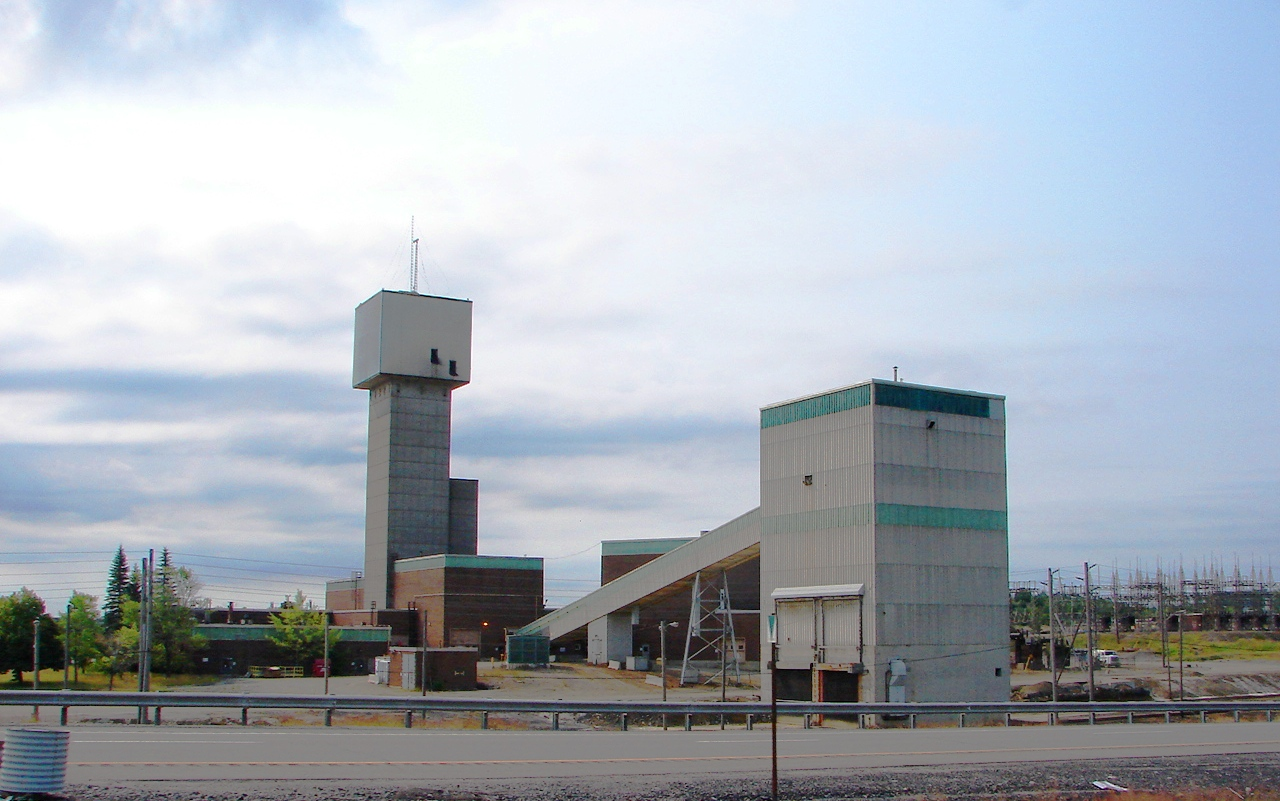
The Copper Cliff South Mine is an underground nickel mine operated by Vale Inco. As of 2010, Vale was the largest employer in Greater Sudbury.

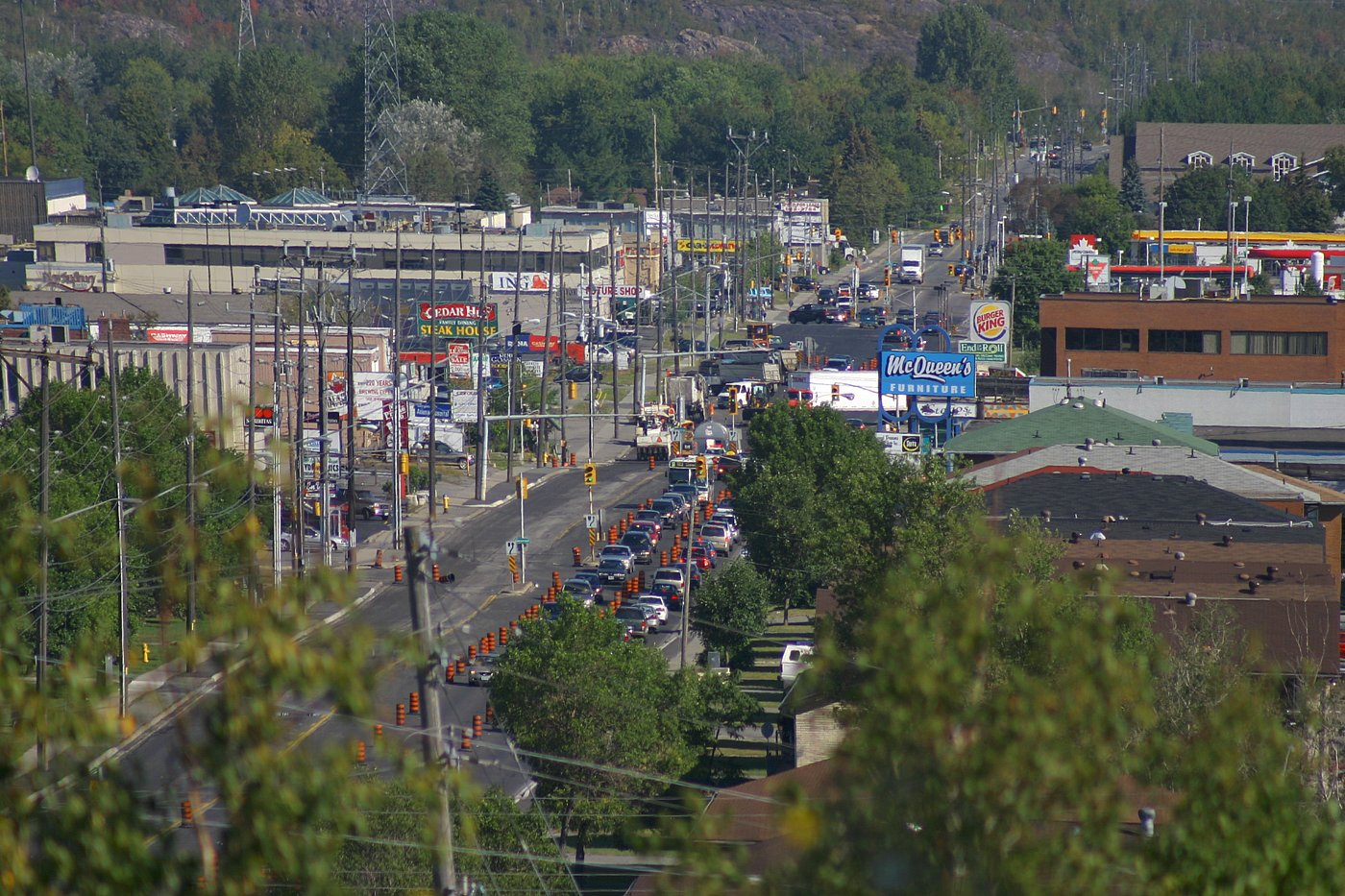
Barry Downe Road in Sudbury, with several businesses in the service sector visible. By 2006, 80 percent of Greater Sudbury's labour force was employed in the service sector.

After a brief period as a lumber camp, Sudbury's economy was dominated by the mining industry for much of the 20th century. By the 1970s, Inco employed a quarter of the local workforce. However, in 2006, Inco and Falconbridge were taken over by foreign multinational corporations: Inco was acquired by the Brazilian company Vale, and Falconbridge was purchased by the Swiss company Xstrata which was in turn purchased by Anglo–Swiss Glencore forming Glencore Xstrata. Several other mining companies, including First Nickel and KGHM, also have mining operations in the Sudbury area.

Mining now employs only 6,000 people in the city, although the mining supply and service sector employs a further 10,000. By 2006, 80% of Greater Sudbury's labour force was employed in services with 20% remaining in manufacturing. Over 345 mining supply and service companies are located in Sudbury. This includes a number of public and private firms pursuing research and development in new mining technologies such as Mining Innovation Rehabilitation and Applied Research Corporation (MIRARCO), the Northern Centre for Advanced Technology (NORCAT), and the Centre for Excellence in Mining Innovation (CEMI).

While mining has decreased in relative importance, Sudbury's economy has diversified to establish itself as a major centre of finance, business, tourism, health care, education, government, and science and technology research. Many of these reflect Sudbury's position as a regional service centre for Northeastern Ontario, a market of 550,000 people.

The top employers in Sudbury as of November 2010 include:

Company / organization	Employees	Sector
Vale	3,999	Mining
Health Sciences North	3,700	Health services
Sudbury Tax Services Office	2,800	Federal government
City of Greater Sudbury	2,166	Municipal government
Laurentian University	1,850	Education
Rainbow District School Board	1,606	Education
Ontario Ministries and Agencies	1,500	Ontario government
Conseil scolaire catholique du Nouvel-Ontario	1,443	Education
Xstrata	1,139	Mining

Many retail businesses in the city have moved outside of the downtown core in the late 20th century and the city has struggled to rebuild and maintain a vibrant downtown core. In the 2000s and early 2010s, projects aimed at revitalizing the downtown core included the creation of Market Square, a farmer's and craft market; the redevelopment of the Rainbow Centre Mall; streetscape beautification projects; the conversion of several underutilized historic properties into mixed-use office and loft developments; and the establishment and launch of the McEwen School of Architecture, as well as cultural events such as Downtown Rotary Blues for Food, Sudbury's Largest Yard and Sidewalk Sale, Downtown Sudbury Ribfest and the Up Here art and music festival. New projects underway in the late 2010s include Place des Arts, a performing and visual arts centre; and the redesign and renovation of the central plaza at Tom Davies Square.

Despite these efforts, a large percentage of the city's retail service sector is still found outside of the downtown core, in areas such as the Four Corners, the RioCan and Silver Hills power centres on the Kingsway, and the New Sudbury Centre, the largest shopping mall in Northern Ontario with 110 stores.

=== Film industry ===
Sudbury has an emerging film and television industry, with a number of projects filming in the city in the 2000s. Development of an active film and television production industry in Northern Ontario was initially undertaken by Cinéfest, the city's largest annual film festival, in the early 1990s, and is currently overseen by Music and Film in Motion, a non-profit organization based in Sudbury.

Films shot in the city have included Resident Evil: Welcome to Raccoon City, Roadkill, Shania: A Life in Eight Albums, The Truth, The Lesser Blessed, High Chicago, Perspective, The Captive, Ice Soldiers, Born to Be Blue, Your Name Here, Indian Horse, The New Romantic, Fitting In and Men with Brooms. Television series filmed in the city include Météo+, Les Bleus de Ramville, Hard Rock Medical, Dark Rising: Warrior of Worlds, Letterkenny, St. Nickel, Cardinal, What Would Sal Do?, Bad Blood and Shoresy.

March Entertainment's studio in Sudbury has produced a number of animated television series, including Chilly Beach, Maple Shorts, Yam Roll, and Dex Hamilton: Alien Entomologist.

The city's LGBT community has been profiled in two documentary films, the Genie Award-winning Mum's the Word (Maman et Ève) in 1996 and The Pinco Triangle in 1999.

Sudbury is also home to the Science North Production Team, an award-winning producer of documentary films and multimedia presentations for museums. Independent filmmaker B. P. Paquette is based in Sudbury. Inner City Films, a production company owned by Sudbury native Robert Adetuyi, also has a production office in the city, as does Carte Blanche Films, the producer of Météo+, Les Blues de Ramville and Hard Rock Medical.

=== Architecture ===
With the construction of the Laurentian University McEwen School of Architecture, as well as increasing development in the city, architecture has become an increasingly important part of the economy in Sudbury.

Notable architecture in Greater Sudbury:

- Belrock Mansion, a historic residence built in 1907 that housed the Art Gallery of Sudbury from 1967 until 2025.
- St. Andrew's Place, a church-community-complex which opened in 1972.
- Sudbury's Shaar Hashomayim Synagogue, is a community-led synagogue which was constructed in 1960 and is the only synagogue in Sudbury.
- Moses Block, Durham at Elgin, Sudbury's only flatiron building built in 1907

== Government ==
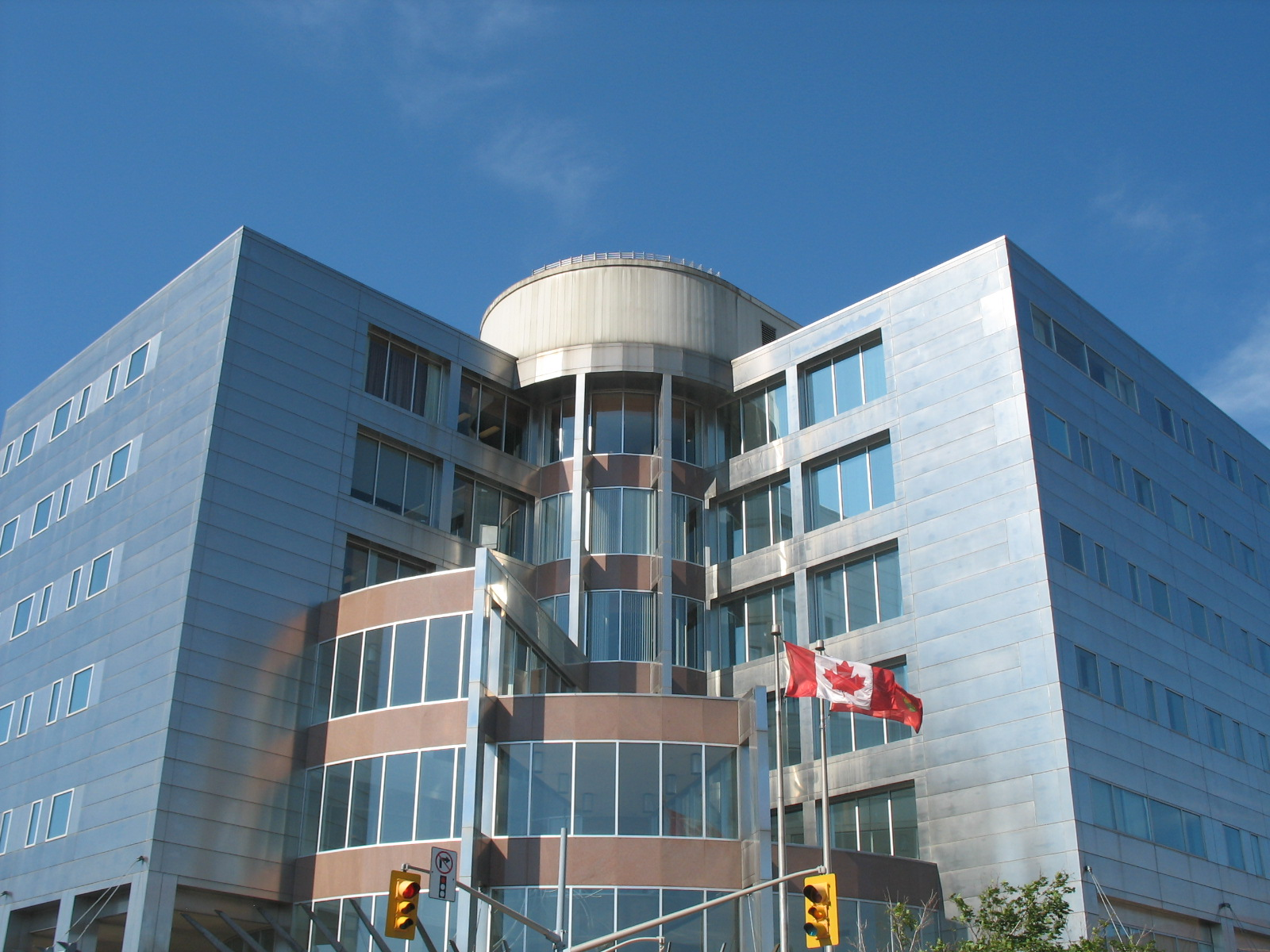
The head office of the provincial government's Ministry of Northern Development, Mines and Forestry, is located in Sudbury.

=== Municipal politics ===
From the city hall at Tom Davies Square, the city is headed by twelve council members and one mayor both elected every four years. The current mayor is Paul Lefebvre, who was elected in the 2022 municipal election. The 2011 operating budget for Greater Sudbury was C$471 million, and the city employs 2006 full-time workers.

=== Federal and provincial politics ===
The city is divided between the federal electoral districts of Sudbury and Sudbury East—Manitoulin—Nickel Belt in the House of Commons of Canada, and the provincial electoral districts of Sudbury, Nickel Belt and Timiskaming—Cochrane in the Legislative Assembly of Ontario. The federal and provincial riding of Sudbury do not have identical boundaries despite using the same names; most notably, the Nickel Centre district of the city is located in Sudbury federally but in Nickel Belt provincially. The city is represented federally by Members of Parliament Viviane Lapointe of the Liberal Party of Canada, and Jim Belanger of the Conservative Party of Canada and provincially by Jamie West, France Gélinas and John Vanthof of the Ontario New Democratic Party. The provincial Ministry of Energy, Northern Development and Mines has its head office in the city.

Both federal and provincial politics in the city tend to be dominated by the Liberal and New Democratic parties. Historically, the Liberals have been stronger in the Sudbury riding, with the New Democrats dominant in Nickel Belt, although both ridings have elected members of both parties at different times.

Greater Sudbury federal election results
Year	Liberal		Conservative		New Democratic		Green	
2021	34%	27,784	28%	22,821	29%	23,857	2%	1,536
2019	39%	32,934	21%	17,633	31%	26,335	6%	5,239

Greater Sudbury provincial election results
Year	PC		New Democratic		Liberal		Green	
2022	29%	17,166	46%	26,746	15%	8,602	4%	2,346
2018	23%	16,036	56%	39,438	16%	11,134	4%	2,606

== Culture ==
With over 22% of its population having French as its mother tongue, Greater Sudbury's culture is influenced by the large Franco-Ontarian community, particularly in the amalgamated municipalities of Valley East and Rayside-Balfour and historically in the Moulin-à-Fleur neighbourhood. The French culture is celebrated with the Franco-Ontarian flag, recognized by the province as an official emblem, which was created in 1975 by a group of teachers at Laurentian University and after some controversy has flown at Tom Davies Square since 2006. The large francophone community plays a central role in developing and maintaining many of the cultural institutions of Sudbury including the Théâtre du Nouvel-Ontario, La Nuit sur l'étang, La Galerie du Nouvel-Ontario, Le Centre franco-ontarien de folklore and the Prise de parole publishing company. The city hosted Les Jeux de la francophonie canadienne in 2011.

=== Arts ===
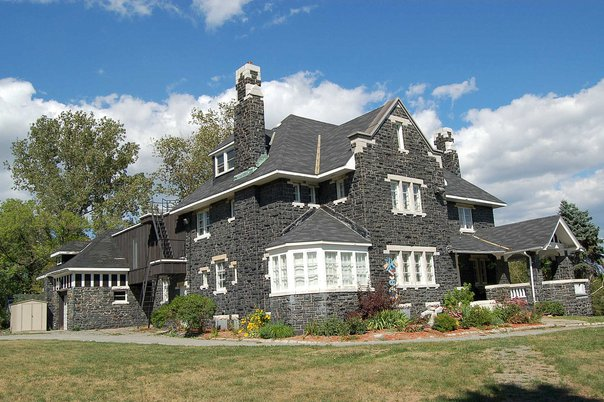
The Art Gallery of Sudbury was founded in 1967, and is one of two art galleries located in the city.

The Sudbury Arts Council was established in 1974. Its mandate is to connect, communicate and celebrate the arts. It has an important role to provide a calendar of events and news about arts and culture activities. The city is home to two art galleries—the Art Gallery of Sudbury and La Galerie du Nouvel-Ontario. Both are dedicated primarily to Canadian art, especially artists from Northern Ontario.

The city's only professional theatre company is the francophone Théâtre du Nouvel-Ontario (TNO), one of seven organizations residing at the Place des Arts, where it also stages its performances. The Sudbury Theatre Centre, which was the city's only professional English-language theatre company, merged with YES Theatre in 2023, though the building which was previously home to the company retains its original name. Theatrical productions are also staged by several community theatre groups, as well as by high school drama students at Sudbury Secondary School, Lo-Ellen Park Secondary School, St. Charles College and École secondaire Macdonald-Cartier with its troupe Les Draveurs. Postsecondary institutions in the city no longer offer training in theatre, following the closures of Theatre programs at Thorneloe University in 2020 and Laurentian University in 2021, as well as the technical production programs at Collège Boréal and Cambrian College.

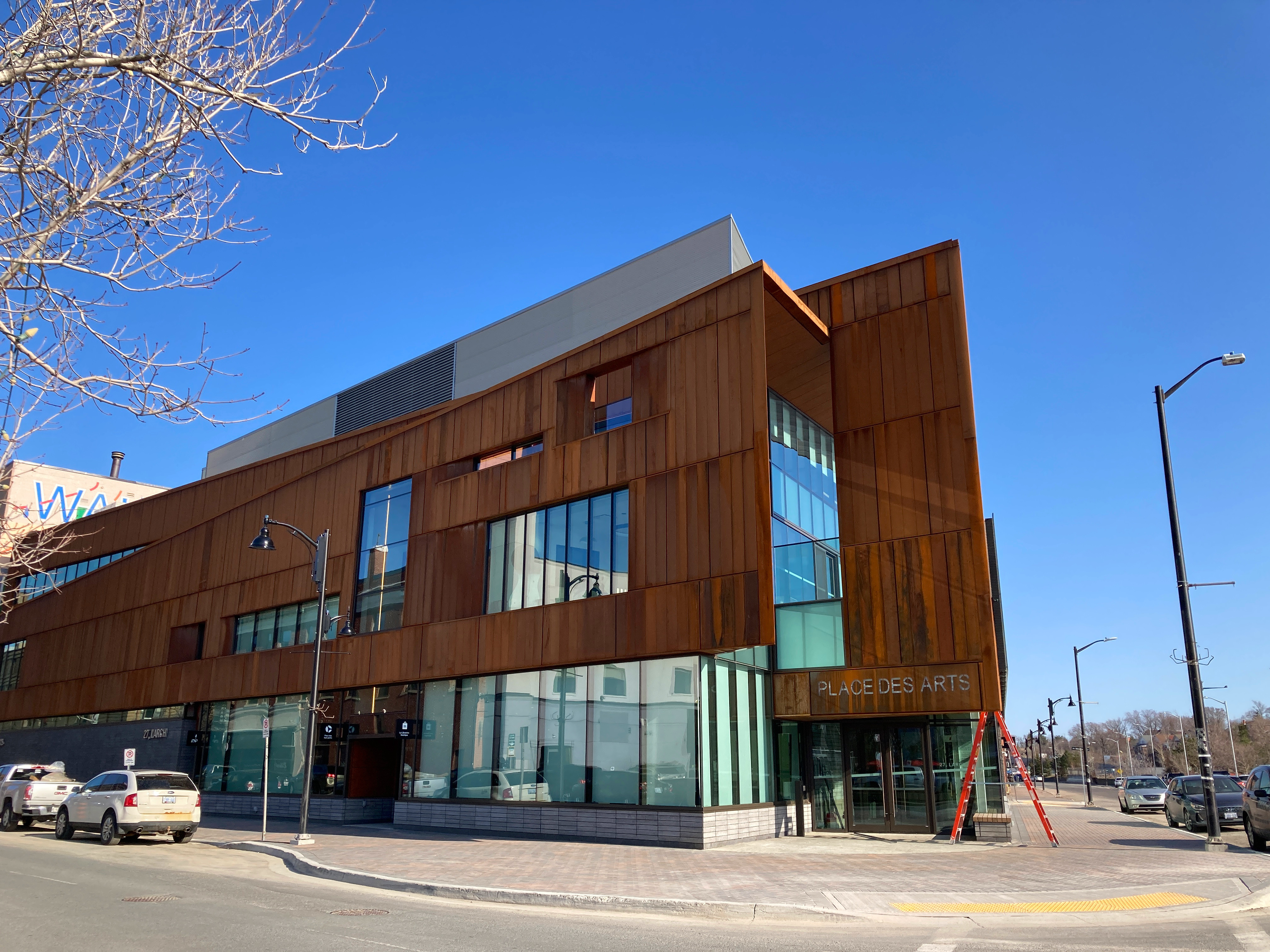
The Place des Arts is currently home to seven of the city's francophone cultural organizations.

In 2021, YES Theatre unveiled plans for the Refettorio, which would convert a vacant lot on Durham Street near the YMCA into an outdoor theatrical and musical performance space. The space opened in August 2023 with a production of Shakespeare's Romeo and Juliet.

Place des Arts, a new project to provide a community hub for the city's francophone cultural institutions including a 300-seat concert hall, a 120-seat theatre studio, an art gallery, a bistro, a gift boutique and bookstore, a children's arts centre and 10,000 square feet of studio space for artists, began construction in the downtown core in 2019, and opened in 2022.

==== Festivals ====
Cinéfest Sudbury International Film Festival, the city's primary annual film festival, has been staged in September each year since 1989. Two smaller specialist film festivals, the Junction North International Documentary Film Festival for documentary films and the Queer North Film Festival for LGBT-themed films, are also held each year. Mainstream commercial films are screened at the SilverCity theatre complex, which is also the primary venue for most Cinéfest screenings. Science North is home to an IMAX theatre which screens a program of IMAX films, the Cavern at Science North hosts some gala screenings during Cinéfest and screens science documentaries during the year, and the Sudbury Indie Cinema Co-op programs a repertory cinema lineup of independent and international films as well as organizing both the Junction North and Queer North film festivals.

In 2021 the Sudbury Indie Cinema Co-op also launched the Sudbury Outdoor Adventure Reels Film Festival, devoted to wilderness and adventure films, following several years of the city hosting an annual stop on the Banff Mountain Film Festival's touring circuit, and in 2022 they launched both the Sudbury's Tiny Underground Film Festival (STUFF) for underground and experimental films, and the Sudbury Indie Creature Kon for horror films.

The city has hosted an annual Sudbury Pride festival since 1997.

The Up Here Festival, launched in 2015, blends a program of musical performance with the creation of both murals and installation art projects throughout the downtown core, while PlaySmelter, a theatre festival devoted to theatrical and storytelling performances by local writers and actors, was launched in 2013, and is held at various venues in the city including the Sudbury Theatre Centre and Place des Arts.

In music, the city is home to the Northern Lights Festival Boréal and La Nuit sur l'étang festivals.

Sudbury also hosts Northern Ontario's only Japanese cultural Festival, Japan Festival Sudbury. It started in 2019, went on hiatus for two years during the COVID-19 pandemic in Ontario, and returned to Sudbury's Bell Park Amphitheatre on July 16, 2022.

==== Literature ====
Works of fiction themed or set primarily or partially in Sudbury or its former suburbs include Robert J. Sawyer's The Neanderthal Parallax trilogy, Alistair MacLeod's novel No Great Mischief, Paul Quarrington's Logan in Overtime, Jean-Marc Dalpé's play 1932, la ville du nickel and his short story collection Contes sudburois, and Chloé LaDuchesse's L'Incendiare de Sudbury. The city is also fictionalized as "Chinookville" in several books by American comedy writer Jack Douglas, and as "Complexity" in Tomson Highway's musical play The (Post) Mistress.

Noted writers who have lived in Sudbury include playwrights Jean-Marc Dalpé, Sandra Shamas and Brigitte Haentjens, poets Robert Dickson, Roger Nash, Gregory Scofield and Margaret Christakos, fiction writers Kelley Armstrong, Sean Costello, Sarah Selecky, Matthew Heiti and Jeffrey Round, poet Patrice Desbiens, journalist Mick Lowe and academics Richard E. Bennett, Michel Bock, Rand Dyck, Graeme S. Mount and Gary Kinsman.

In 2010, the city created the position of Poet Laureate, with Roger Nash being the first to occupy the role. Subsequent holders of the position have included Daniel Aubin (2012–2013), Thomas Leduc (2014–2015), Kim Fahner (2016–2018), Chloé LaDuchesse (2018–2020), Vera Constantineau (2020–2022), Kyla Heyming (2022–2024) and Alex Tétreault (2024–present).

==== Music ====
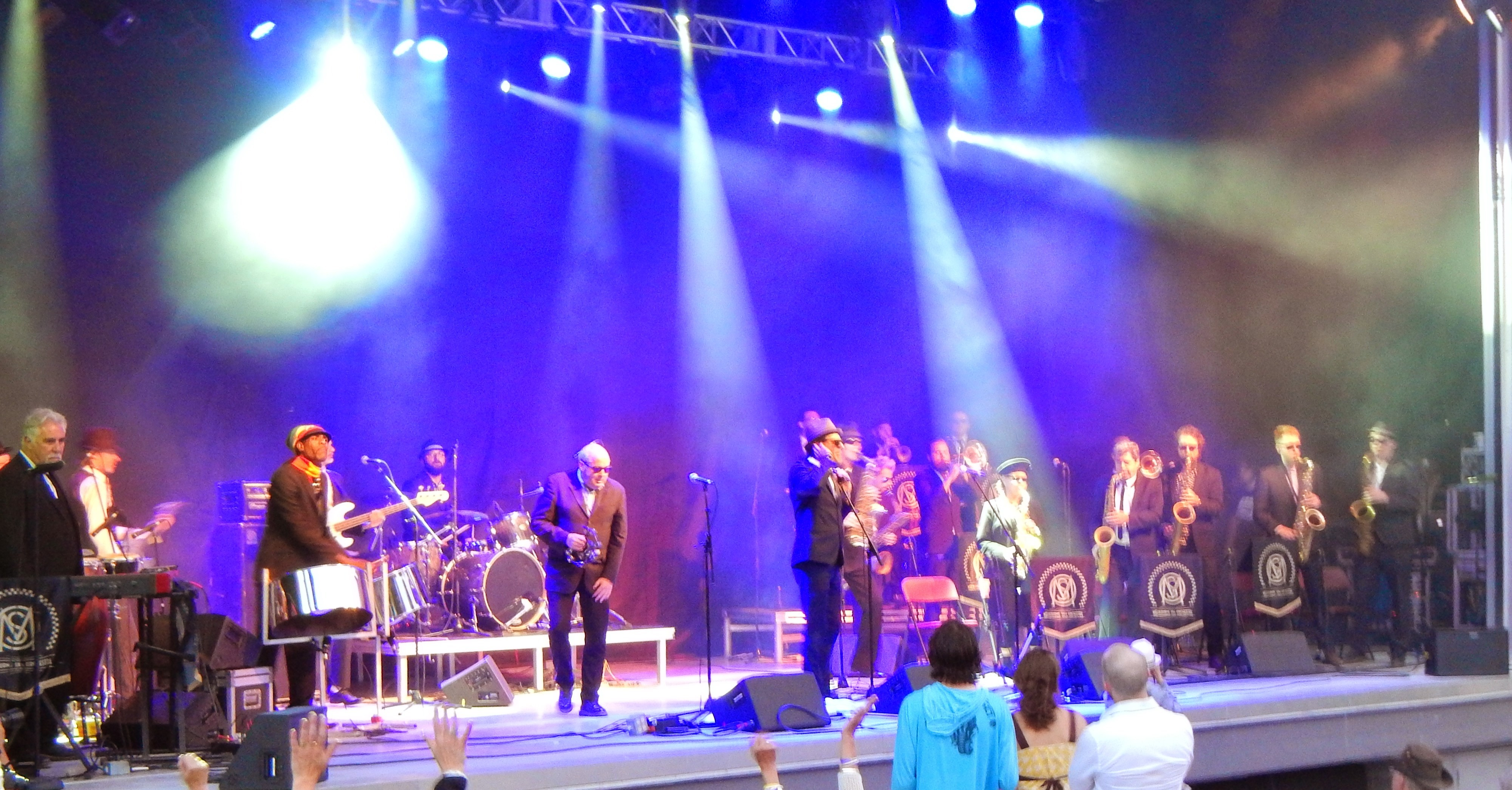
The Melbourne Ska Orchestra performing at the Northern Lights Festival Boréal. Hosted annually in Sudbury, it is Canada's oldest music festival in continuous operation.

Sudbury's most successful artists have predominantly been in the country, folk and country-rock genres. These include Robert Paquette, Kate Maki, Gil Grand, Kevin Closs, CANO, Jake Mathews, Loma Lyns, Alex J. Robinson, Chuck Labelle, En Bref and Ox. The rap rock bands Project Wyze and Konflit Dramatik were also based in Sudbury, and Miriam Linna, who drummed in the Cramps, Nervus Rex and The A-Bones, was born in Sudbury.

High-profile concerts take place at the Sudbury Community Arena, while other touring acts play venues including the Grand Theatre, Knox Hall, and The Towne House.

Bell Park's outdoor Grace Hartman Amphitheatre serves as the primary venue for the Northern Lights Festival Boréal, and hosts other summer concerts. Concerts are also sometimes staged at Laurentian University's Fraser Auditorium, although it is also used for theatre shows, stand-up comedy performances and lectures rather than serving as a full-time music venue.

In addition to the Northern Lights Festival Boréal, the city is also home to the Up Here Festival, which blends musical performances by underground and experimental musicians with public mural projects, and La Nuit sur l'étang, a festival of francophone music.

The local Sudbury Symphony Orchestra performs regular concerts of classical music, usually staged in the Sheridan Auditorium at Sudbury Secondary School but occasionally at other venues.

Sudbury is also home to the Blue Saints Drum and Bugle Corps, a youth drum corps active since 1952.

One of Stompin' Tom Connors' most famous songs, "Sudbury Saturday Night", depicts the hard-drinking, hard-partying social life of hard rock miners of Sudbury.

=== Attractions ===
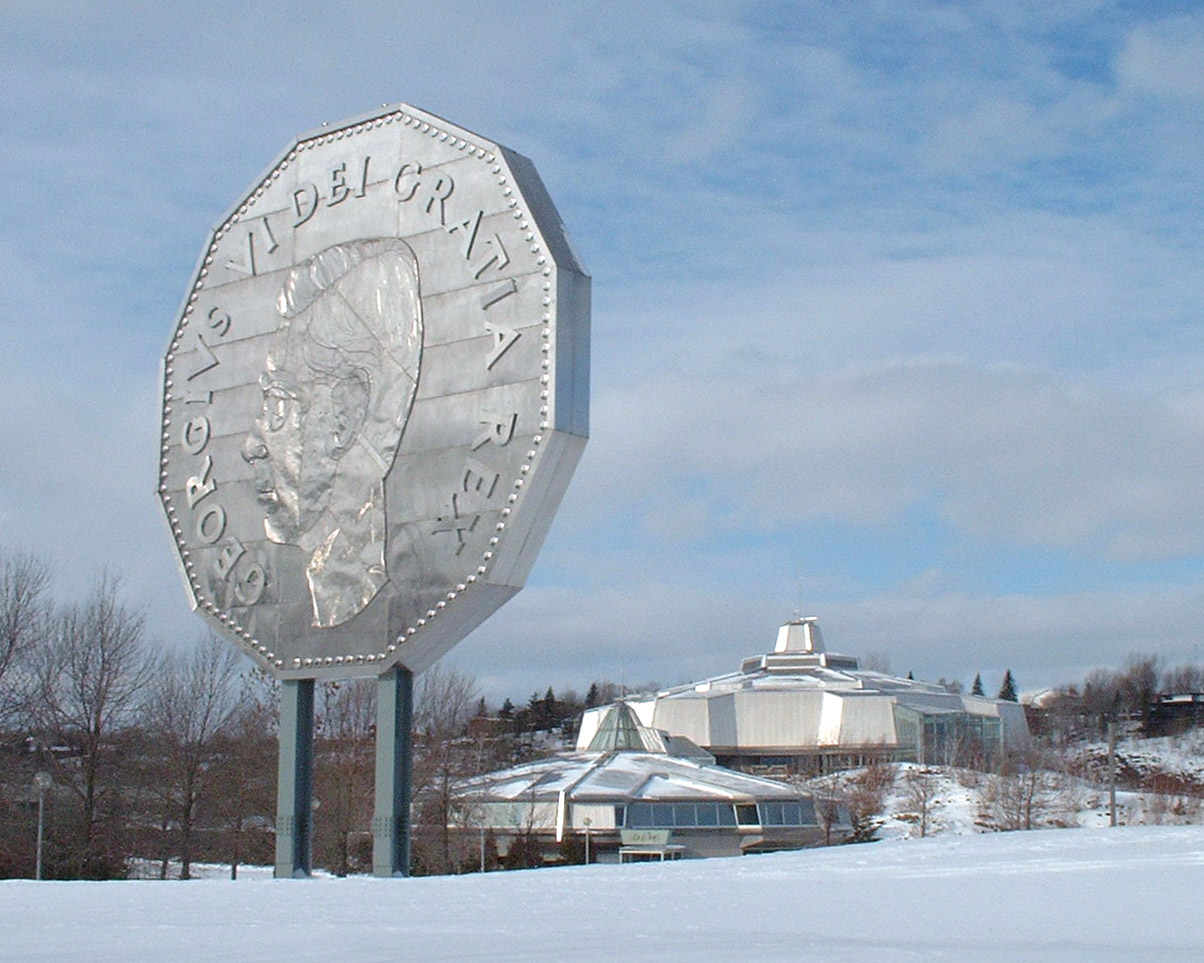
In the early 2000s, the Big Nickel was temporarily moved to the grounds of Science North while its original and current site was refurbished into Dynamic Earth.

Science North is an interactive science museum and Northern Ontario's most popular tourist attraction with around 288,000 visitors per year (as of 2018). It consists of two snowflake-shaped buildings on the southwestern shore of Ramsey Lake and just south of the city's downtown core. There is also a former ice hockey arena on-site, which includes the complex's entrance and an IMAX theatre. The snowflake buildings are connected by a rock tunnel, which passes through a billion-year-old geologic fault. Sudbury's mining heritage is reflected in another major tourist attraction, Dynamic Earth. This interactive science museum focuses principally on geology and mining history exhibitions, and is also home to the Big Nickel, one of Sudbury's most famous landmarks. The city is also home to the Greater Sudbury Heritage Museums, a group of historical community museums, and a mining heritage monument overlooking the city's Bell Park.

The Inco Superstack was the tallest freestanding chimney in the world at 380 m (1,250 ft) until the construction of the Ekibastuz GRES-2 Power Station, and is currently the second tallest structure in Canada after the CN Tower. It is almost the same height as the roof of the Empire State Building.

=== Sports ===
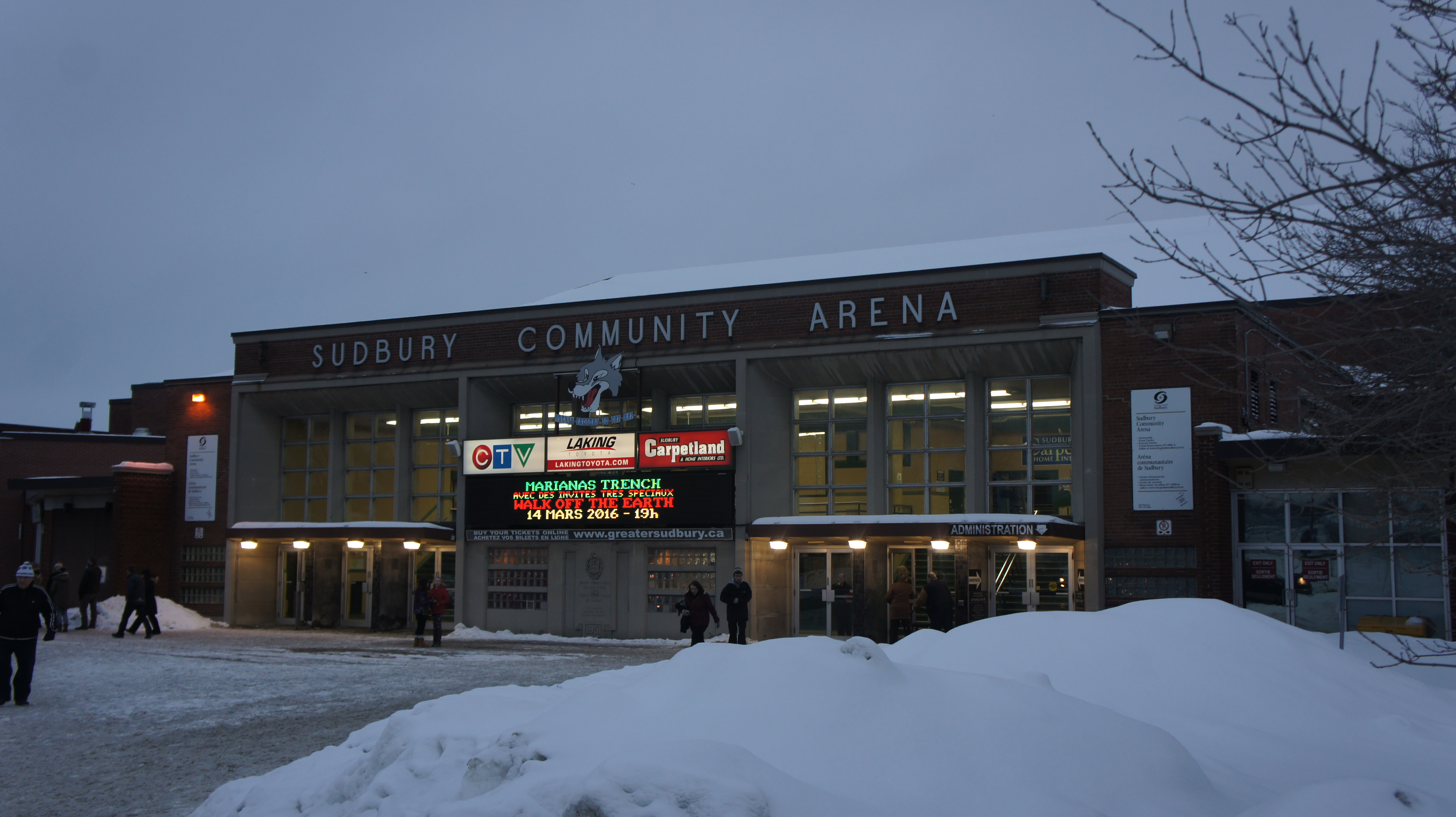
Entrance to the Sudbury Community Arena. The arena is a multi-purpose arena and the home of the OHL's Sudbury Wolves, as well as being a key venue in the television comedy series Shoresy.

Sudbury has many trails that are used year-round, and there are approximately 200 km (120 mi) of non-motorized trails in the city. In the winter, The Sudbury Trail Plan grooms almost 1,200 km (750 mi) of trails for snowmobiles. There is 23 km (14 mi) of diverse hiking, biking, and jogging trails found in the Lake Laurentian Conservation Area near downtown. Other trails link Sudbury to areas outside of the city including the Trans Canada Trail, which passes through the city, and the Voyageur Hiking Trail. The city is also home to Sudbury Downs, a harness racing track located in Azilda.

The sports teams based in Sudbury
Club	League	Sport	Championship	Venue	Established
Sudbury Wolves	Ontario Hockey League	Ice hockey	0	Sudbury Community Arena	1972
Sudbury Five	Basketball Super League	Basketball	2	Sudbury Community Arena	2018
Sudbury Cyclones	Premier Soccer Leagues Canada	Soccer	0	James Jerome Sports Complex	2024
Sudbury Spartans	Canadian Major Football League	Canadian football	0	James Jerome Sports Complex	1953

There are a number of sports teams located in the city including the Sudbury Wolves who play at the Sudbury Community Arena. The Wolves are an ice hockey team within the Ontario Hockey League. The Sudbury Spartans football club have played in the Northern Football Conference since 1954. Laurentian University participates in the U Sports league by the Laurentian Voyageurs and the Laurentian Lady Vees. Cambrian College is represented in the Canadian Collegiate Athletic Association by the Cambrian Golden Shield, and Collège Boréal is represented by the Boréal Vipères. High school students compete in the Sudbury District Secondary School Athletic Association (SDSSAA), which is a division of Northern Ontario Secondary School Athletics (NOSSA). The city hosted the Pan American Junior Athletics Championships in 1980, the IAAF World Junior Championships in Athletics in 1988, the Brier: Canada's annual men's curling championships in 1953 and 1983, the 2001 Scott Tournament of Hearts: the women's curling championship, and the 2010 Ontario Summer Games.

Greater Sudbury hosts a professional basketball team, the Sudbury Five, who play at the Sudbury Community Arena. The Five are owned by Sudbury Wolves Sports and Entertainment and began play in the National Basketball League of Canada in November 2018. The Five currently play in the Basketball Super League.

The city is also home to a semi-professional soccer team, the Sudbury Cyclones, founded in 2024. The men's team gained back-to-back promotions since their first season in League2 Ontario and will begin play in League1 Ontario Premier, in the third tier of the Canadian soccer pyramid, in 2026.

== Infrastructure ==
=== Health care ===
Greater Sudbury serves as the health care centre for much of northeastern Ontario through Health Sciences North. Sudbury is also the site of the Regional Cancer Program, which treats cancer patients from across the north. Sudbury's first General Hospital opened in 1950 and operated until 2010. Known as St. Joseph Health Centre, the building sat abandoned for 15 years before being demolished in 2025. The new Sudbury Regional Hospital functions with Health Sciences North on Ramsey Lake Road. In 1968, the first successful coronary artery bypass surgery in Canada was performed at Sudbury Memorial Hospital. Adult mental health services are also provided to the area through Health Sciences North, primarily at the Kirkwood site (formerly the Sudbury Algoma Hospital) and at the Cedar site downtown. Children's mental health services are provided through the Regional Children's Psychiatric Centre operated by the Northeast Mental Health Centre, located onsite at the Kirkwood Site of Health Sciences North.

=== Emergency services ===
Greater Sudbury is served by the Greater Sudbury Police Service, headquartered in downtown Sudbury. There is also a detachment of the Ontario Provincial Police located in the McFarlane Lake area of the city's south end. Greater Sudbury Emergency Medical Services provides prehospital paramedic services with over 150 full-time and part-time paramedics. Greater Sudbury Fire Services operates from 24 fire stations located throughout the city, with a combination 103 career staff and 350 volunteer fire fighters. Prior to the municipal amalgamation of 2001, most of the suburban towns were served by separate volunteer fire departments, which were amalgamated into the citywide service as part of the municipal restructuring. The municipally owned energy provider Greater Sudbury Utilities serves the city's urban core, while rural areas in the city continue to be served by Hydro One.

=== Utilities ===
Greater Sudbury Utilities Inc. (GSU) delivers utility services in the city's urban core. Its sole shareholder is the City of Greater Sudbury.

=== Transportation ===
==== Public transportation ====
The city maintains a bus-based public transit system, GOVA, transporting 4.4 million passengers in 2012. The year 2000 marked the most significant change in Greater Sudbury's local transit history, as outlying townships were annexed into the municipality to form Greater Sudbury, expanding Greater Sudbury Transit's service area to one larger than most Ontario municipal and regional public transit agencies. The Downtown Transit Centre is the primary hub for local transit in Sudbury.

==== Air ====
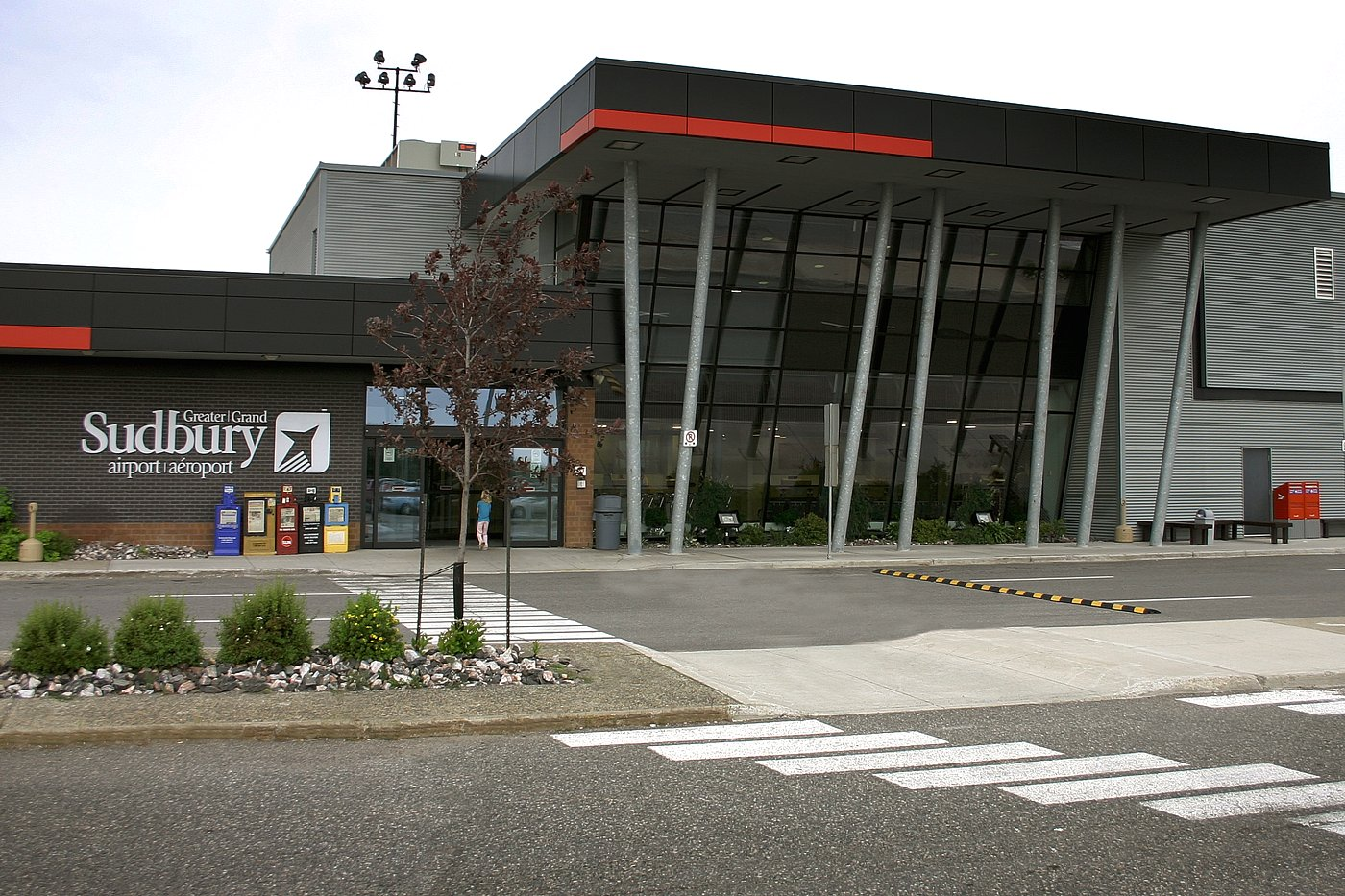
Sudbury Airport is an airport that serves Greater Sudbury, handling scheduled flights throughout Ontario.

The Greater Sudbury Airport maintains two paved runways 6,600 ft (2,000 m) and 5,000 ft (1,500 m) in length and serves 270,784 passengers per year (2017). The airport is served by three regional carrier lines: Air Canada Express to Toronto Pearson International Airport, Porter Airlines to Billy Bishop Toronto City Airport and Bearskin Airlines to several destinations in Northern Ontario including North Bay, Sault Ste. Marie, Timmins and Thunder Bay. WestJet provides seasonal non-stop service from the Greater Sudbury Airport to the Calgary International Airport.

==== Intercity transportation ====
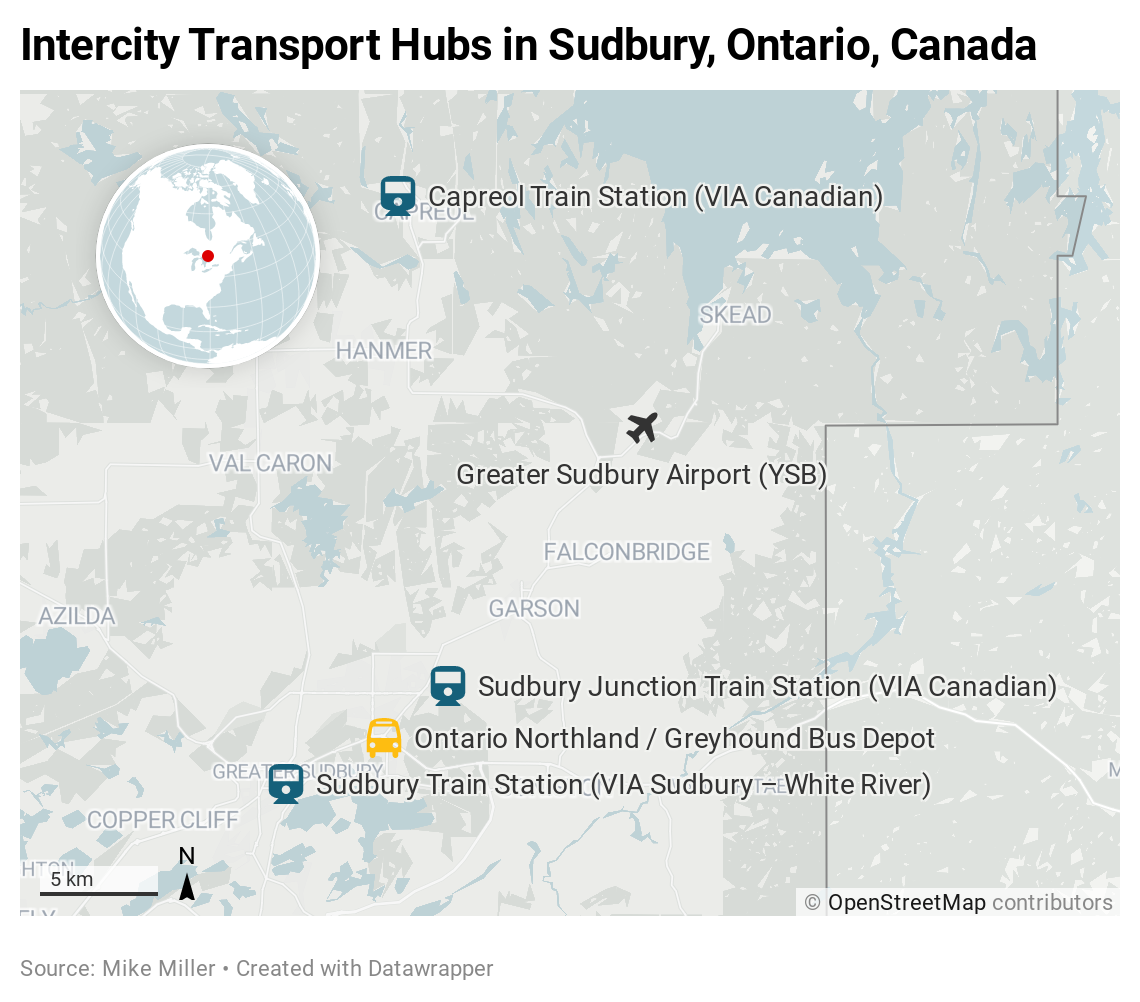
Intercity Transport Hubs in Sudbury, Ontario, Canada

Several different agencies provide intercity transportation to Sudbury. Via Rail's Sudbury–White River train (a remnant of the old Lake Superior passenger service to Thunder Bay) serves a number of remote interior communities, some of which are not accessible by road, from the downtown Sudbury station. To the north and east of the city, Capreol station and Sudbury Junction station are stops on Via Rail's transcontinental passenger service, the Canadian, which passes through the area twice a week in each direction.

Intercity motor coach service is available at the Sudbury Ontario Northland Bus Terminal, which is a stop for Ontario Northland motor coaches. Destinations include North Bay, Sault Ste. Marie, Hearst, Barrie, Toronto, and Ottawa.

==== Roads and highways ====
There are three highways connecting Sudbury to the rest of Ontario: Highway 17 is the main branch of the Trans-Canada Highway, connecting the city to points east and west. An approximately 21 km (13 mi) segment of Highway 17, from Mikkola to Whitefish, is freeway. The highway bypasses the city via two separately-constructed roads, the Southwest and Southeast Bypasses, that form a partial ring road around the southern end of the city's urban core for traffic travelling through Highway 17. The former alignment of Highway 17 through the city is now Municipal Road 55. Highway 69, also a branch of the Trans-Canada Highway, leads south to Parry Sound, where it connects to the Highway 400 freeway to Toronto; Highway 400 is being extended to Greater Sudbury and is scheduled for completion in the 2020s. Highway 144 leads north to Highway 101 in Timmins.

Greater Sudbury is the only census division in Northern Ontario that maintains a system of numbered municipal roads, similar to the county road system in the southern part of the province. Secondary Highway 537, which essentially provides an outer bypass link between Highway 69 at Wanup and Highway 17 at Wahnapitae, is also the only remaining secondary highway in the province located in any census division which also has its own municipal or county road system.

== Education ==
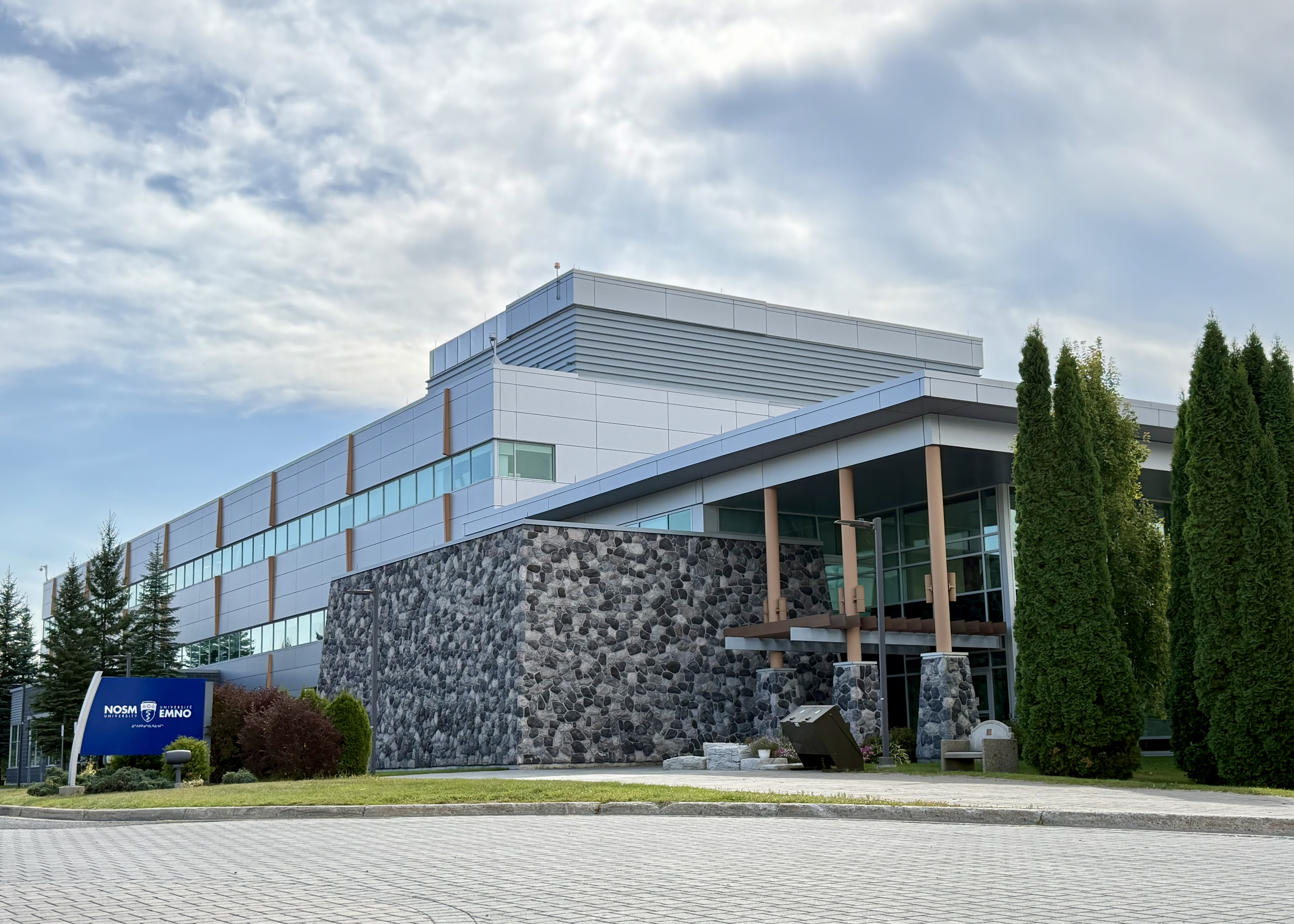
The Northern Ontario School of Medicine

Greater Sudbury is home to three postsecondary institutions: Laurentian University, a primarily undergraduate bilingual university with approximately 9,000 students, Cambrian College, an English college of applied arts and technology with 4,500 full-time and 7,500 part-time students, Collège Boréal, a francophone college with 2,000 enrolled, and the Northern Ontario School of Medicine. On September 4, 2013, Laurentian University opened the McEwen School of Architecture in downtown Sudbury, the first new architecture school to launch in Canada in more than 40 years. Opened in 2011 and located on the Laurentian University campus is the Vale Living with Lakes Centre which focuses on the research of stressors that can affect the health of water based ecosystems, contributing to the better ecological health of Sudbury. Canadian post-secondary institutions have also impacted the city's science and technology sectors. The Creighton Mine site in Sudbury is home to SNOLAB, the second-deepest (after China Jinping Underground Laboratory in China) underground laboratory in the world and the site of numerous dark matter experiments. Originally constructed for the Sudbury Neutrino Observatory (now concluded), the underground laboratory has been expanded and continues to operate as SNOLAB. The SNO equipment has been refurbished for use in the SNO+ experiment.

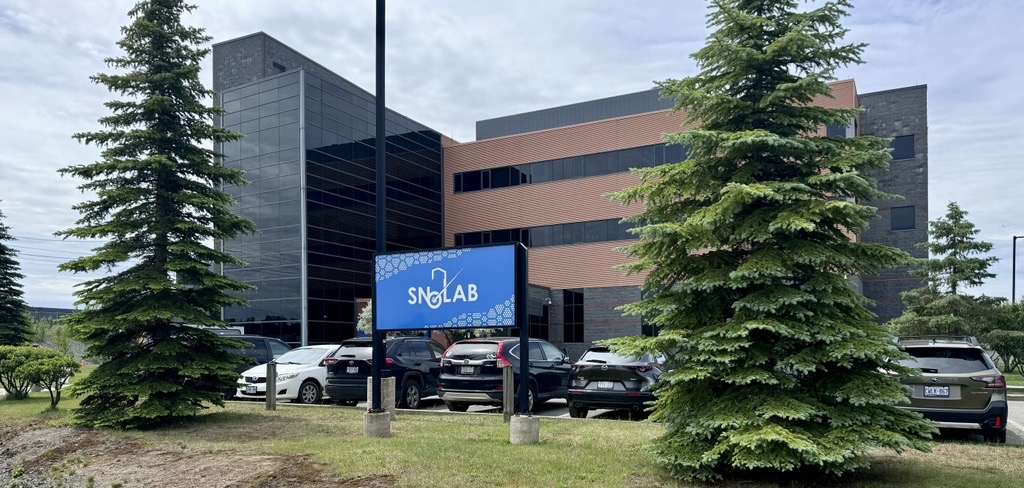
SNOLAB is an underground physics laboratory operated by several universities, including Laurentian.

English-language public schooling is provided by the Rainbow District School Board. The board operates 28 elementary and nine secondary schools in Sudbury, one school for students with special needs, and the Cecil Facer Youth Centre for young offenders. The Sudbury Catholic District School Board offers publicly funded English-language Catholic education, with 16 elementary schools, five high schools and an adult education centre. French-language public schools are administered by the Conseil scolaire de district du Grand Nord de l'Ontario with seven elementary and two secondary schools and one alternative secondary school. Finally, the Conseil scolaire catholique du Nouvel-Ontario provides publicly funded French-language Catholic education, with 15 elementary, four secondary schools, and one adult education secondary school. There are also two Christian private schools (Sudbury Christian Academy and King Christian Academy), as well two Montessori schools (King Montessori Academy and the Montessori School of Sudbury).

The Greater Sudbury Public Library system has 13 branches throughout the city. The library system had 600,000 items as of 2011 and over 50% of the resident population are active library users. The Sudbury Tool Library and Makerspace are located at the main branch of the Greater Sudbury Public Library.

== Media ==
As the largest city in Northern Ontario, Greater Sudbury is the region's primary media centre. Due to the relatively small size of the region's individual media markets, most of the region is served at least partially by Sudbury-based media. CICI-TV produces almost all local programming on the CTV Northern Ontario system, and the CBC Radio stations CBCS-FM and CBON-FM broadcast to the entire region through extensive rebroadcaster networks. As well, many of the commercial radio stations in Northeastern Ontario's smaller cities simulcast programming produced in Sudbury for at least a portion of their programming schedules, particularly in weekend and evening slots.

Sudbury's daily newspaper, the Sudbury Star is owned by Postmedia, is published six days a week and has a weekday circulation of 17,530 as of 2006. The city's longtime community newspaper Northern Life ceased print publication in 2020, concurrently with its sale from Laurentian Media Group to Village Media, and remains in operation as the web-only publication Sudbury.com.

There is also a weekly francophone publication, Le Voyageur. The South Side Story used to be a print and online publication but has been defunct since 2019.

== Notable people ==
Notable people from Sudbury include television game-show Jeopardy! host Alex Trebek (which he hosted from 1984 to his death in 2020), Supreme Court Justice Michelle O'Bonsawin, architect Jason F. McLennan who created the Living Building Challenge and is CEO of McLennan Design, Power Corporation of Canada chairman Paul Desmarais Jr., Member of Parliament Éric St-Pierre, mining speculator and philanthropist Frank Giustra, founder of Lionsgate Entertainment president of United Steelworkers, Leo Gerard, Canada national soccer team forward Cloé Lacasse, former Anaheim Ducks and Toronto Maple Leafs head coach Randy Carlyle, Olympic swimmer Alex Baumann, Rebecca Johnston who plays for the Canadian Women's Hockey Team, and Tessa Bonhomme was a former player. Sudbury has produced 81 National Hockey League hockey players including Hockey Hall of Fame inductees Eddie Giacomin, George Armstrong, Art Ross, and Al Arbour.

== See also ==
- List of tallest buildings in Greater Sudbury
- List of francophone communities in Ontario
