= Creighton fault =

Fault line

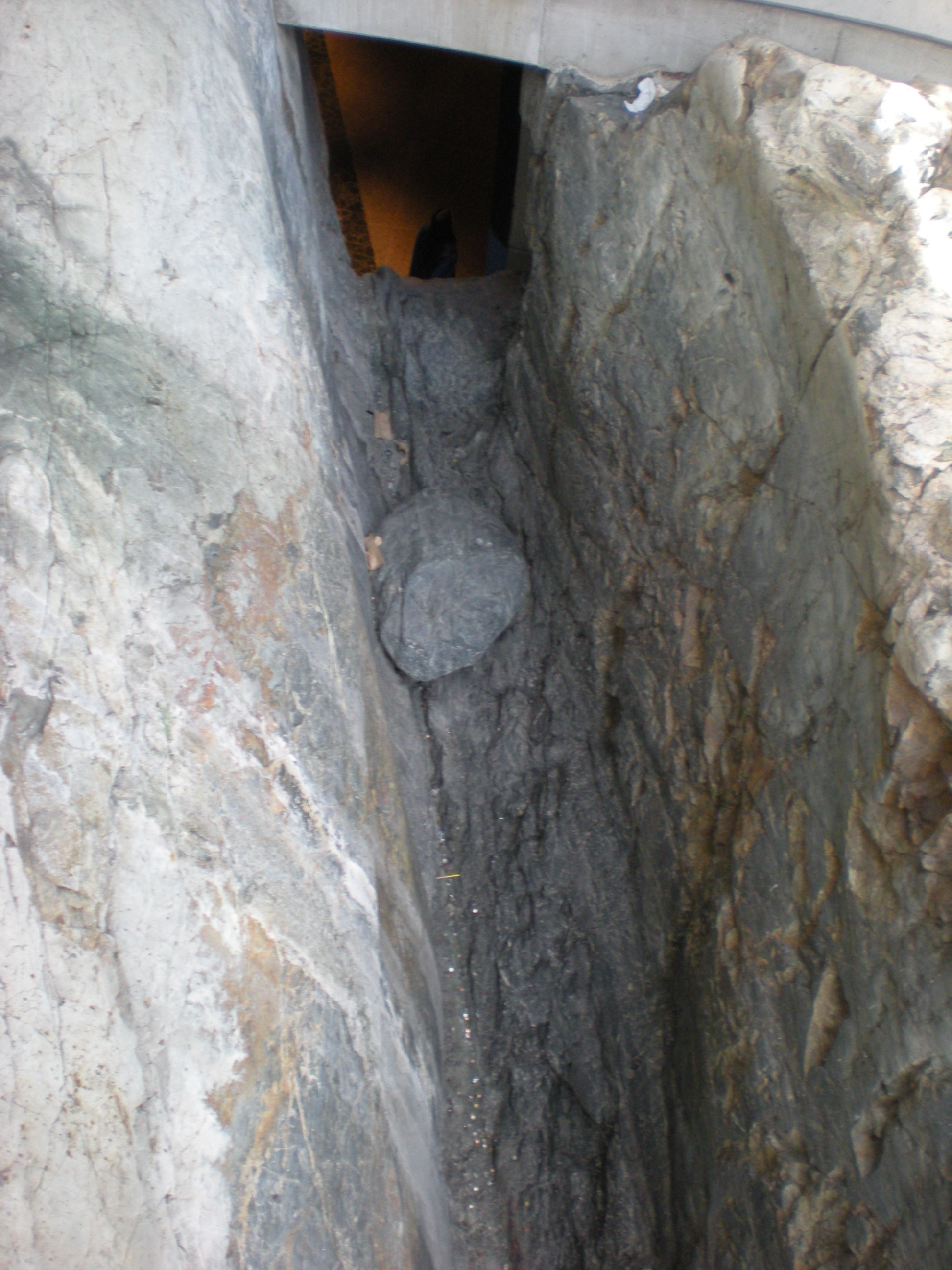
The Creighton fault as it passes under Science North

Creighton fault is a major fault line through the Sudbury Basin in Canada. It has a mapped length of 56 km, a throw of over 600m, and a shear zone 30m wide, and runs east–west through Lake Ramsey and the Creighton mine. The fault is the raison-d'etre of Greater Sudbury, and plays host to countless magmatic orebodies.
