= Shaarey Shomayim =

Shaarey Shomayim or Shaarei/Shaaray Shamayim/Shomoyim (Hebrew: שערי שמים "Gates of Heaven") may refer to the following Jewish synagogues:

== Canada ==
- Shaarei Shomayim (Toronto)

== United States ==
- Congregation Sha'arai Shomayim (Mobile, Alabama)
  - Sha'arai Shomayim Cemetery, Mobile, Alabama
- First Roumanian-American congregation (Congregation Shaarey Shamoyim), Manhattan, New York
- Gates of Heaven Synagogue (Shaarei Shamayim), Madison, Wisconsin

== See also ==
- Shaar Hashamayim (disambiguation)
