= Flag and coat of arms of Greater Sudbury =

Flag and coat of arms for a city in Ontario, Canada

City of Greater Sudbury
- City of Greater Sudbury flag
- Proportion: 2:3
- Adopted: 15 December 2003; 22 years ago
- Design: A bicolour of green and gold, divided by a line of fir trees, with a gold five-pointed star in the upper hoist quarter.
- Designed by: Bruce Patterson

Coat of arms of Greater Sudbury
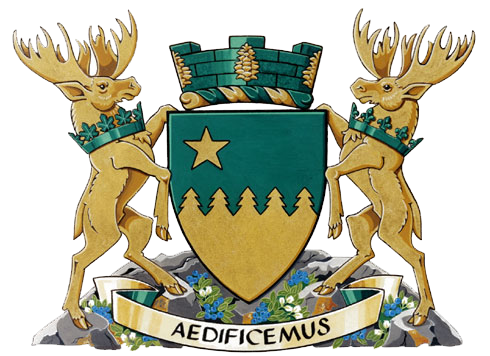
- Armiger: City of Greater Sudbury, Ontario
- Adopted: 15 December 2003; 22 years ago
- Crest: A mural crown Vert set with pine cones Or.
- Shield: Per fess sapiné Vert and Or, in dexter chief a mullet Or.
- Supporters: Two moose Or, that to the dexter gorged with a coronet erablé, that to the sinister gorged with a coronet fleurdelisé Vert, both standing on a rocky mount set with blueberry plants proper.
- Motto: Aedificemus (Latin for "Let us build")
- Badge: A mullet anglé of pine cones Or.

The coat of arms of Greater Sudbury is the official heraldic symbol of the City of Greater Sudbury, a city in the Canadian Province of Ontario. The flag of Greater Sudbury is a banner of these arms. The letters patent were granted to the city by the Canadian Heraldic Authority on December 15, 2003.

== Description ==
The coat of arms can be described as follows: Per fess sapiné Vert and Or, in dexter chief a mullet Or; The crest: A mural crown Vert set with pine cones Or; Both supporters are moose Or, that to the dexter gorged with a coronet erablé, that to the sinister gorged with a coronet fleurdelisé Vert, both are standing on a rocky mount set with blueberry plants proper; below which is placed a scroll with the motto Aedificemus, Latin for "Let us build".

The Canadian Heraldic Authority's official blazon of the coat of arms is:

- Arms: Per fess sapiné Vert and Or, in dexter chief a mullet Or.
- Crest: A mural crown Vert set with pine cones Or.
- Supporters: Two moose Or, that to the dexter gorged with a coronet erablé, that to the sinister gorged with a coronet fleurdelisé Vert, both standing on a rocky mount set with blueberry plants proper.
- Motto: Aedificemus

The arms displayed on the shield are designed to represent the white pine forests of region, as well as subsequent regreening efforts. The use of pine cones represents rebirth as well as Ste-Anne-des-Pins, the original name of Sudbury.

== Former arms ==
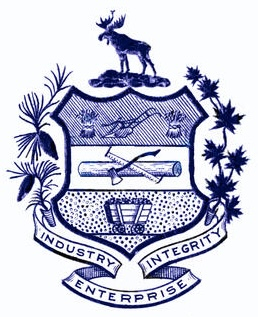
The arms of Sudbury, used until 2001 with minor variations.

Prior to the creation of Greater Sudbury in 2001, a different coat of arms was used. The arms consisted of three bands symbolizing the farming, logging, and mining industries, supported by pine branches, maple leaves, and a moose, with the motto Industry, Enterprise, Integrity..

== See also ==
- Flag of Saskatchewan
