= Shaar Hashomayim Synagogue (Sudbury) =

Synagogue

General information
- Architectural style: Postmodern style
- Location: Sudbury, Ontario, Canada

Design and construction
- Architect: Mandel Charles Sprachman

Shaar Hashomayim is a synagogue in Sudbury, Ontario, Canada. It was dedicated on April 24, 1960. That year, the congregation joined the United Synagogues of America, the chief organ of Conservative Judaism.

Approximately 30 families attend the Shaar Hashomayim synagogue. It has 25 active families.

== Building ==
=== Exterior ===
The Shar Hashomayim synagogue is a post-modern-style building. Its exterior is composed of a simple façade constructed of brown brick with white trim. The exterior has a large sculpture constructed out of seven concrete pillars that represents the menorah.

The green space surrounding the building backs onto a woodland, as well as a ravine. The view is guided towards the sky because the building appears to be horizontal, but this is contrasted with the repetition of vertical windows at the front .

On the exterior of the building, there is a dedication stone that marks the legacy of the Jewish Community.

=== Interior ===
The building has seven thin vertical windows that divide the illumination into seven streams of light to represent the menorah. This large window inside is behind the synagogues bema and the vertical pieces diffuse the eastern sunlight.

There is unobstructed view of the ner tamid to the left of the bema.

=== Architect ===
Mandel Charles Sprachman
- Born: 15 January 1925; Toronto, Canada
- Died: 11 February 2002 (aged 77)
- Education: University of Toronto School of Architecture
- Known for: Architecture

The architect was Mandel Charles Sprachman (January 15, 1925, Toronto - February 11th, 2002), a graduate of the University of Toronto School of Architecture who ran his own architecture firm.

== Programs and services ==
Shaar Hashomayim welcomes Jews of every denomination as well as members of any other faith.

Every service always includes women and men. The Shaar Hashomayim Synagogue also provides Hebrew school on Sundays for the kids in the families of the Jewish community. They also have bar/ bat mitzvah lessons and adult education is available as lectures, discussion/study groups and special events.

== Documentation ==
The Shaar Hashomayim synagogue was featured in a project by three University of Toronto architecture graduates; Sheldon Leitt, Lynn Milstone, and Sid Tenenbaum. Between1976 and 1980, the students took pictures of synagogues across Canada.

The student published a book entitled Treasures of the people: The synagogues of Canada (Toronto: Lest & Orpen Dennys Limited, 1985).
