= Sudbury Pride =

Annual LGBT event in Toronto, Ontario

Fierté Sudbury Pride
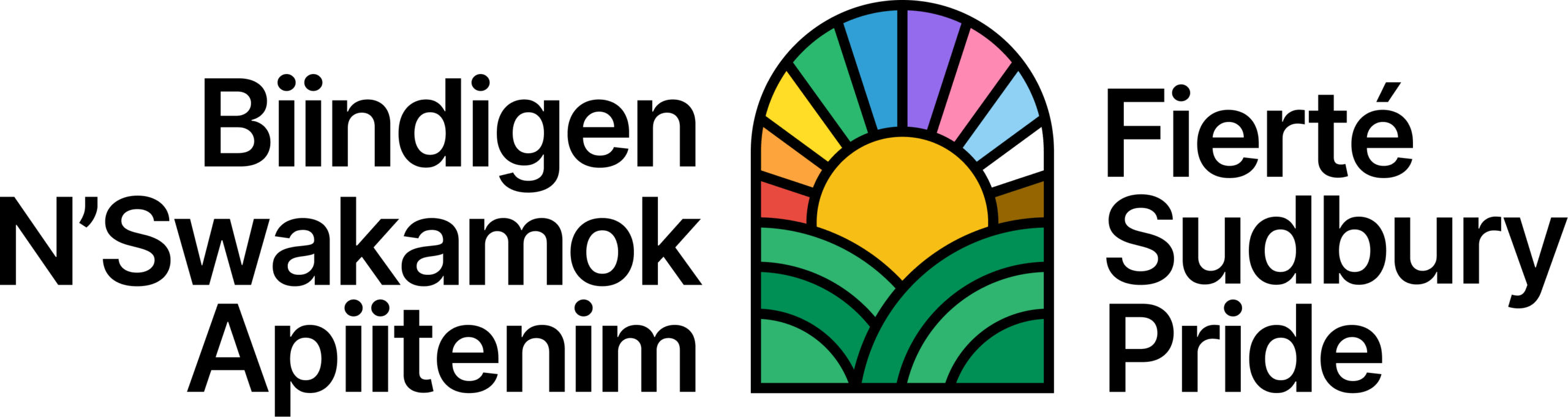

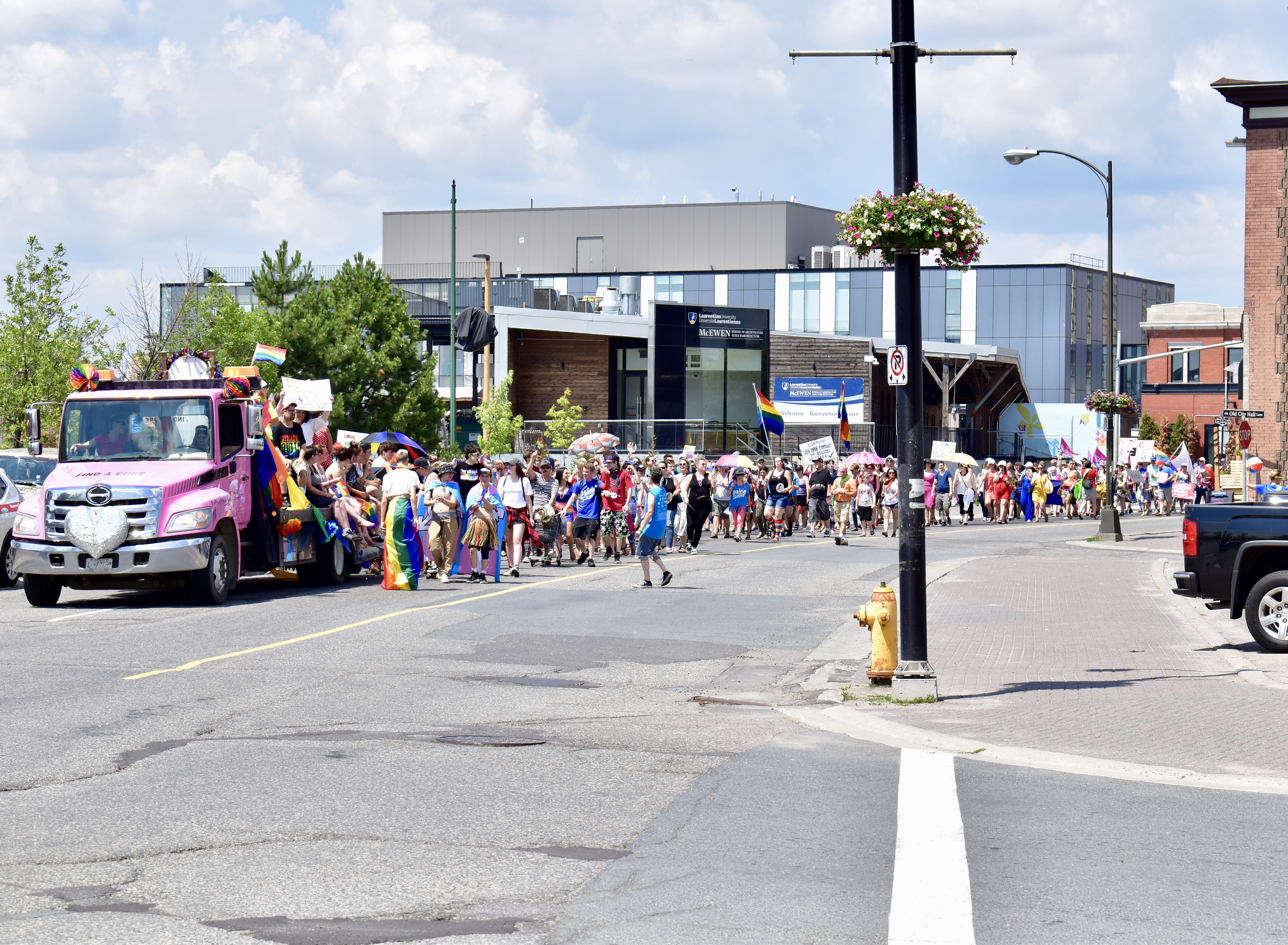
- 2018 Pride March through Downtown Sudbury
- Formation: 1997; 29 years ago (Incorporated in 2012)
- Type: 2SLGBTQ+ not-for-profit community organization
- Legal status: Active
- Purpose: Advocate, educate, and entertain
- Headquarters: Greater Sudbury
- Region served: Greater Sudbury
- Official language: English, French
- Website: Sudbury Pride

Fierté Sudbury Pride (FSP) is a 2SLGBTQ+ Pride advocacy organization based in Greater Sudbury, Ontario, Canada. Their now annual Pride festival, held for the first time in 1997 and organized by a committee that included sociologist Gary Kinsman, was the first Pride event in Northern Ontario, and the only one in the region until the launch of Thunder Bay's Thunder Pride festival in 2010.

The first parade occurred on July 19, 1997. After the first event it was then held in August of each year until 2007, and has since been held in July.

In 2006, This Magazine cited Sudbury Pride as an event which, because of the city's working class culture, feels "real, dangerous, like Pride's supposed to feel."

== Events ==
Originally consisting of only a Pride March, the event expanded in 2006 to become what is now known as Pride Week. Following an opening ceremony and the raising of the Pride Flag at Tom Davies Square to launch the festival, a week-long series of events is held. Though the specific events and projects vary from year to year, these have included film screenings at Rainbow Cinema and the Sudbury Indie Cinema Co-op, a youth-centered Pride Prom at the Sudbury Theatre Centre, as well as events at Science North, Market Square, Bell Park, the downtown branch of the Greater Sudbury Public Library and various bars and restaurants in the city's downtown core, including Zig's, the city's only gay bar. On the final day of the festival, a march takes place through downtown.

In 2014, the event added an annual program of awards to honour local businesses, organizations, and individuals who have been trailblazers in the city's LGBTQ2 community.

Starting in 2018, the organization modified its mandate to create year-round programming, events, and projects, as well as increasing outreach efforts with other marginalized groups. The first such event took place in February 2019 and consisted of a speed friending event, as an alternative to speed dating, and a winter formal.

From 2019 to 2021 the organization's chair was Alex Tétreault, who has since gone on to become the city's poet laureate as of 2024.

The 2020 event was cancelled due to the COVID-19 pandemic in Canada, although its organizers announced plans to proceed with an online "digital pride festival" called Queerantine. The Queerantine program included panel discussions and a public forum on policing, a livestreamed Pride mass from St. Andrews United Church, a trivia competition, local author readings and theatrical performances from the Théâtre du Nouvel-Ontario, and musical performances by Jennifer Holub, Tafari Anthony and G.R. Gritt. In addition to the livestream, some of the events were broadcast on EastLink TV, the city's cable community channel. A second online event, Queerantine 2.0, took place in the summer of 2021 in response to continued uncertainty caused by the COVID-19 pandemic.

To launch the 2023 edition of Pride Week, the organization put on its first two-spirit social and powwow.

== Activism ==
In 2017, following similar discussions at Pride Toronto in response to demands from the Toronto chapter of Black Lives Matter in 2016 and in response to feedback from marginalized community members, it was jointly decided by Sudbury Pride and the Greater Sudbury Police Service to not allow the participation of uniformed police officers during its Pride March.

In response to the controversy surrounding Doug Ford's 2018 plan to revise Ontario's 2015 sex education curriculum, Sudbury Pride sought to file a human rights complaint against the provincial government to the Ontario Human Rights Commission.

In 2020, the organization and activists from Greater Sudbury's 2SLGBTQ+ community reported being targets of a campaign of harassment by local far-right and extremist groups. This campaign received public responses from both the Greater Sudbury Police Service and NDP members of provincial parliament condemning the attacks.

Sudbury Pride chose to cancel its Pride March in 2023 following pressure from local activists and groups, in particular from Black Lives Matter Sudbury. They criticized the involvement of the Greater Sudbury Police Service, whose presence was required by the City in order to issue a permit for the event.
