= Belrock Mansion =

Mansion in Greater Sudbury, Ontario

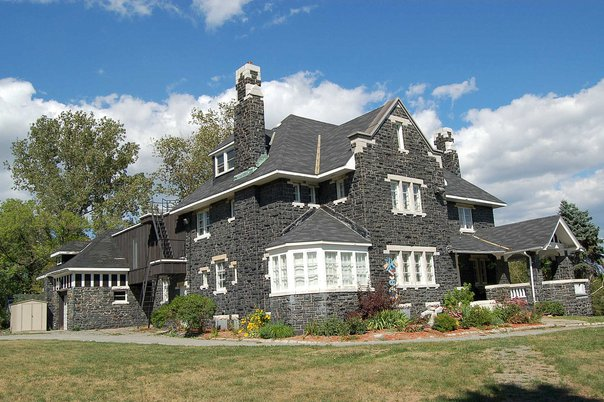
- Belrock Mansion in 2012
- Interactive map of Belrock Mansion
- 46°28′57″N 80°59′15″W
- Location: 251 John Street; Sudbury, Ontario; P3E 1P9

History
- Built: 1907
- Built for: William and Katherine Bell

Site notes
- Architectural style: Arts and Crafts
- Restored: 1967

Ontario Heritage Act
- Designated: December 13, 1984
- Reference no.: 3543

Belrock Mansion, also known as Bell Mansion, is a historic building in the Kingsmount-Bell Park neighbourhood of Sudbury, Ontario, Canada. Constructed in 1906, it was home to lumber baron William J. Bell and his wife Katherine. From 1967 until 2024, the mansion housed the Art Gallery of Sudbury.

== History ==
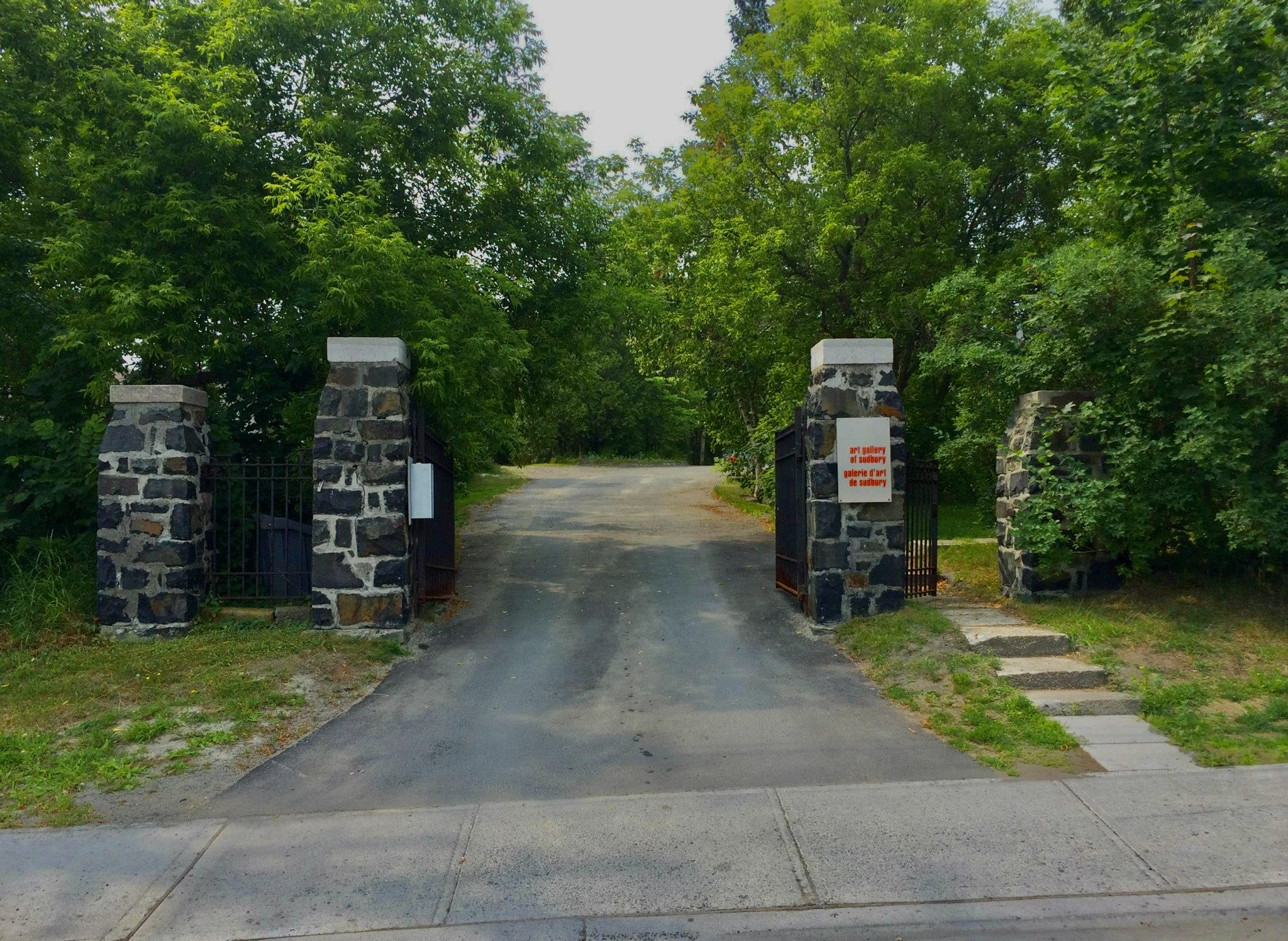
Main entrance to Belrock Mansion

Belrock Mansion was constructed on a 155 acre tract of land stretching along the northwestern shore of Ramsey Lake that Bell and his wife purchased in 1906 for $301. In 1926, the Bells donated 110 acres of the land to the Town of Sudbury to double the size of a park on Ramsey Lake in exchange for the closure of several streets surrounding the Mansion. The park was named in their honour.

William died on January 12 1945, and Katherine remained in the home until her death on January 9 1954. After their deaths, Belrock was given to Sudbury Memorial Hospital. The estate was briefly used as a staff residence until it was damaged by a fire on December 3 1955, and the estate would largely sit vacant for the next 12 years. The Nickel Lodge of the Masonic Order explored renovations to convert the estate into their headquarters, but sold it to the Sudbury Chamber of Commerce in 1966.

The estate was restored in 1967 as a Centennial Project and given to Laurentian University the following year to house the Laurentian University Museum and Art Centre, which became the Art Gallery of Sudbury in 1997. In 1984, the City of Sudbury designated the estate as a property of architectural and historical value under the Ontario Heritage Act.

The art gallery temporarily closed in October 2023 due to structural issues, and permanently moved out in July 2025 to a temporary location until the completion of the Cultural Hub at Tom Davies Square, which is expected to be completed by 2027.

In December 2024, Laurentian University moved to sell the estate following the University's financial restructuring, and it was listed in August 2025 for $1 Million. The move has drawn public attention as the estate was transferred to Laurentian University for a symbolic price of $1 to establish a "public museum or cultural centre" in 1967. In May 2025, the Kingsmount-Bell Park Community Action Network released a petition urging Laurentian University and the City of Greater Sudbury to ensure continued public access to the estate and its grounds.

== Architecture ==
The principle stonemason was John James, with hundreds of tons of local stones cut for the mansion. The home itself is built of coursed cut stone, while the coach house is of coursed rubble stone. Carpenters John McAdam and Campbell Girwood installed the oak panelling of the original interior. After the 1955 fire and subsequent renovations to adapt the estate into an art gallery, the interior has largely been modernized except for a small conservatory on the main floor.

== See also ==
- Art Gallery of Sudbury
- List of historic places in Greater Sudbury
