= List of lakes of Greater Sudbury =

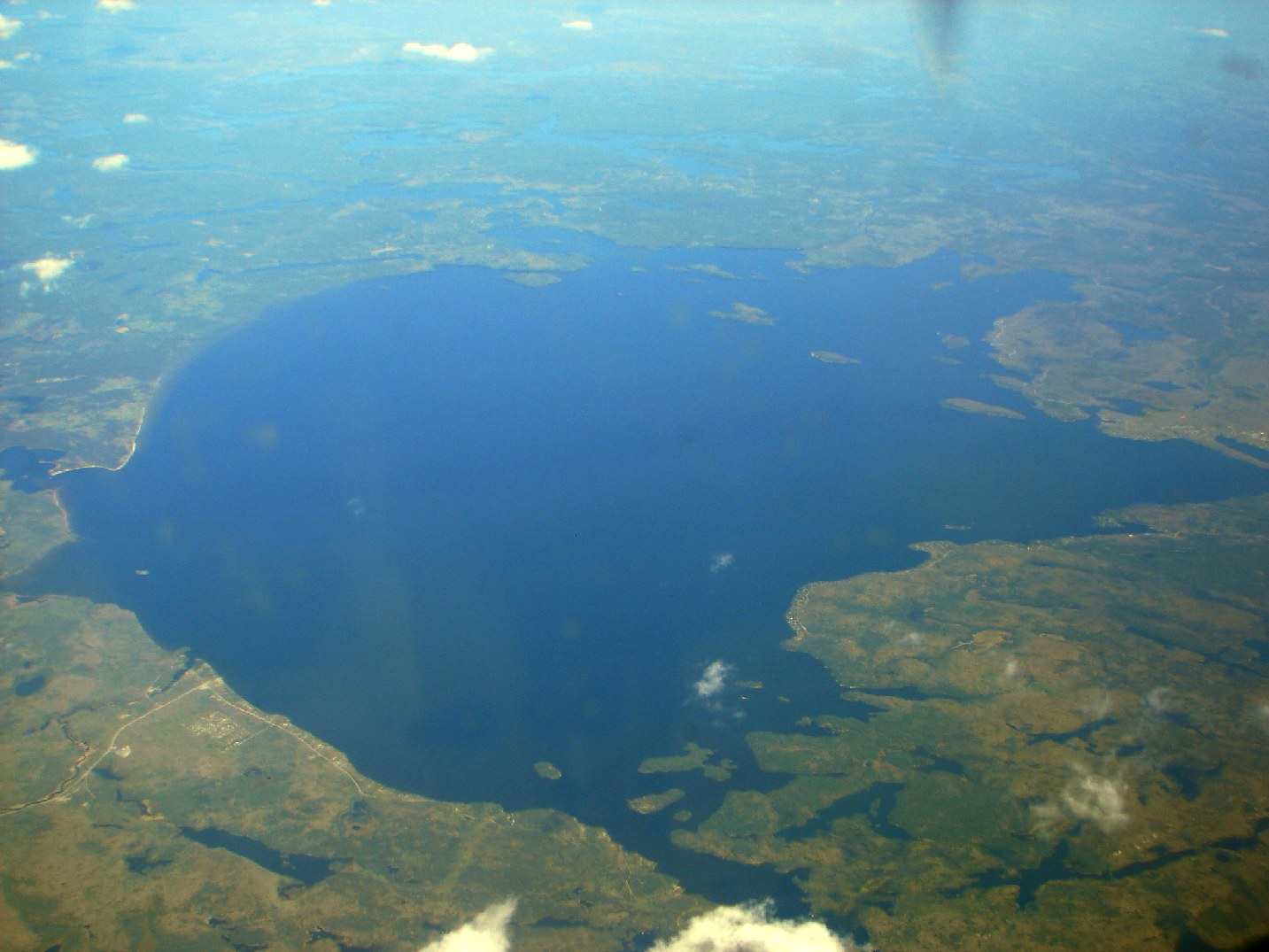
Lake Wanapitei

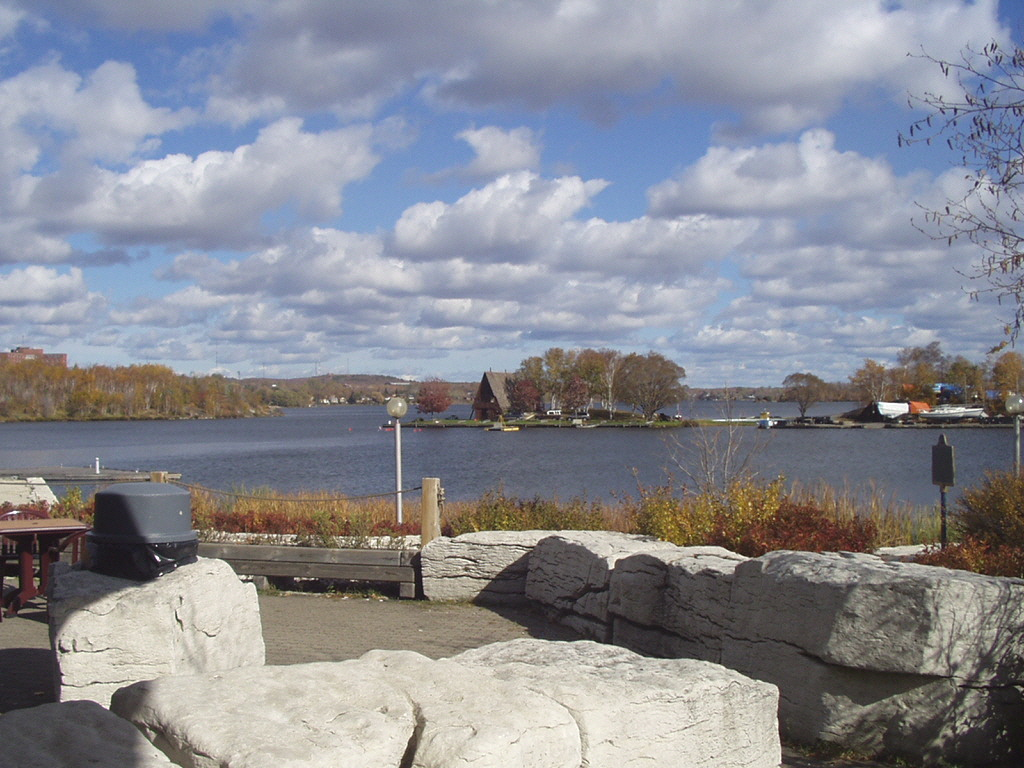
Lake Ramsey

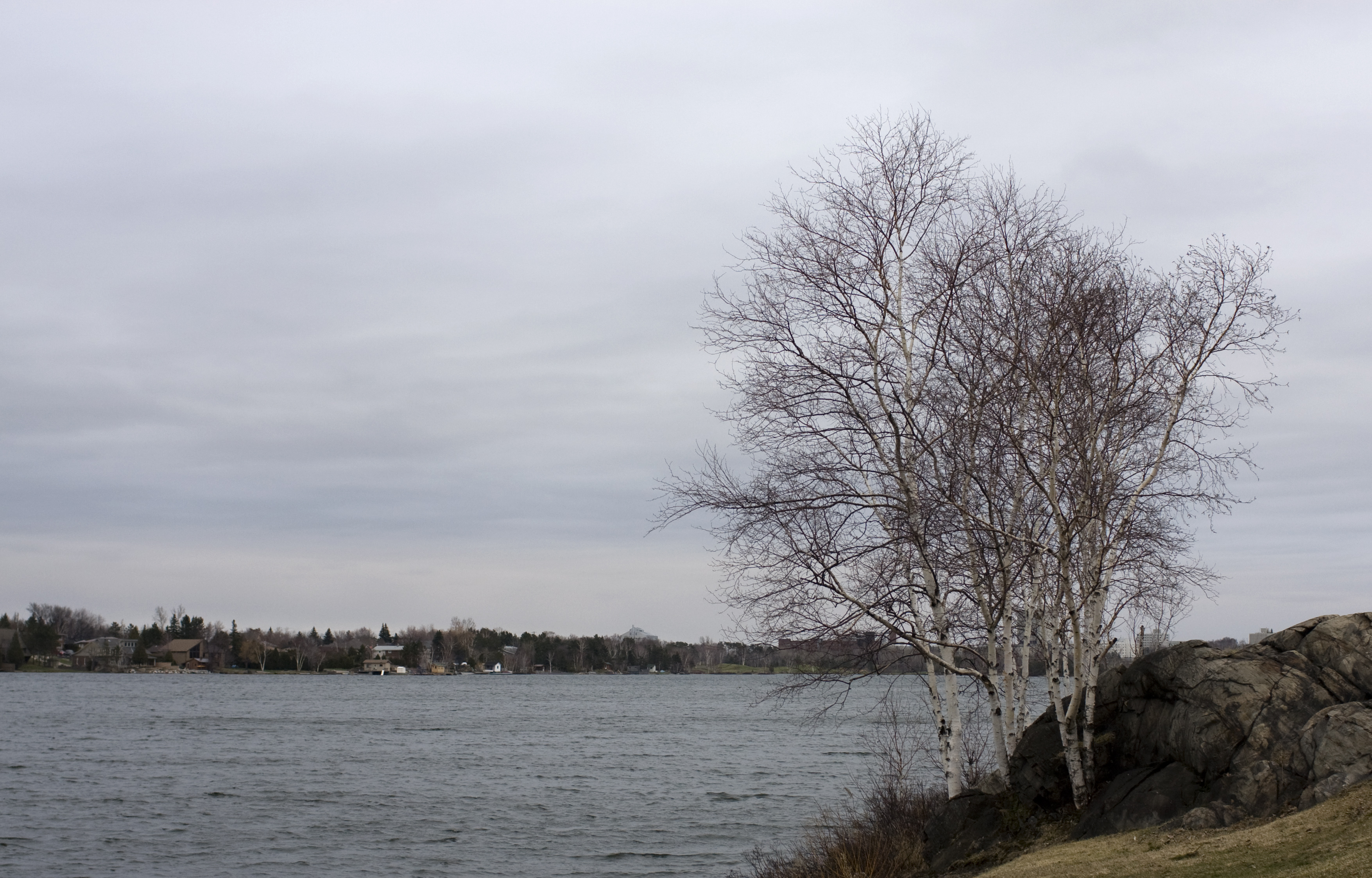
Lake Nepahwin

Greater Sudbury (Ontario, Canada) is considered a city of lakes containing 330 lakes, and the largest lake contained within a city, Lake Wanapitei with 13,257 hectares. The lakes drain into two main watersheds: to the east is the French River watershed which flows into Lake Huron via Georgian Bay, and to the west is the Spanish River watershed which flows into Lake Huron via the North Channel.

Lakes are used for many recreational purposes including boating, swimming, and ice skating in winter. Lakes in Greater Sudbury are also home to numerous species of fish, of which many are caught for sport. A survey conducted between 2000 and 2006 in 43 lakes found the following fish species: eastern blacknose dace, blacknose shiner, bluegill, brook stickleback, bluntnose minnow, brown bullhead, burbot, central mudminnow, cisco (lake herring), common shiner, creek chub, emerald Shiner, fathead minnow, finescale dace, golden shiner, Iowa darter, Johnny darter, lake chub, lake trout, lake whitefish, largemouth bass, common logperch, mottled sculpin, ninespine stickleback, northern pike, northern pearl dace, pumpkinseed, rainbow smelt, rock bass, slimy sculpin, smallmouth bass, splake, spoonhead sculpin, spottail shiner, trout-perch, walleye, white sucker, and yellow perch.

== Lakes over 10,000 hectares ==
- Lake Wanapitei (13,257) (1st)

== Lakes over 1,000 hectares ==
- Lake Panache (8,034.1) (2nd)
- Kukagami Lake (1,864.8) (3rd)
- Matagamasi Lake (1,317.10) (4th)
- Windy Lake (1,129.0) (5th)
- Vermilion Lake (1,126.6) (6th)

== Lakes over 100 hectares ==
- Whitewater Lake (949.1) (7th)
- Long Lake (861.3) (8th)
- Ramsey Lake (792.2) (9th)
- Fairbank Lake (705.1) (10th)
- Whitson Lake (473.4) (11th)
- Ashigami Lake (434.70) (12th)
- Makada Lake (353.8) (13th)
- Kelly Lake (340.8) (14th)
- Nelson Lake (308.8) (15th)
- Agnew Lake (294.0) (16th)
- Joe Lake (216.2) (17th)
- Gordon Lake (180.0) (18th)
- Meatbird Lake (175.0) (19th)
- Kusk Lake (174.9) (20th)
- Ella Lake (166.1) (21st)
- McFarlane Lake (166.1) (21st)
- Red Deer Lake (158.1) (23rd)
- McCharles Lake (150.1) (24rd)
- Lake Laurentian (128.1) (25th)
- Lake Nepahwin (127.0) (26th)
- Skill Lake (112.7) (27th)
- Brodill Lake (112.1) (28th)
- Raft Lake (109.6) (29th)
- Chief Lake (105.2) (30th)
- Little Lake Panache (102.9) (31st)
- Simon Lake (102.0) (32nd)

== Lakes over 10 hectares ==
- Richard Lake (83.6) (33rd)
- Ironside Lake (80.4) (34th)
- Clearwater Lake (76.0) (35th)
- Baby Lake (59.3) (36th)
- Hanmer Lake (54.4) (37th)
- Tilton Lake (51.7) (38th)
- Mud Lake (47.8) (39th)
- T Lake (44.4) (40th)
- Lohi Lake (41.6) (41st)
- Frenchman Lake (43.8) (42nd)
- Crowley Lake (43.5) (43rd)
- St. Charles Lake (41.3) (44th)
- Broder 23 (Wolf) Lake (36.9) (45th)
- Daisy Lake (36.6) (46th)
- Onwatin Lake (34.2) (47th)
- Greens Lake (34.0) (48th)
- Robinson Lake (33.6) (49th)
- Bethel Lake (31.2) (50th)
- Perch Lake (31.2) (50th)
- Middle Lake (28.1) (52nd)
- Hannah Lake (27.7) (53rd)
- Linton Lake (27.7) (53rd)
- Alice Lake (26.7) (55th)
- Crooked Lake (26.3) (56th)
- Silver Lake (21.8) (57th)
- Minnow Lake (20.9) (58th)
- Big Beaver Lake (20.1) (59th)
- Camp Lake (19.9) (60th)
- Little Raft Lake (19.7) (61st)
- Kasten Lake (17.4) (62nd)
- Little Beaver Lake (16.9) (63rd)
- Forest Lake (15.8) (64th)
- McCrea Lake (15.8) (64th)
- Bennett Lake (13.6) (66th)

== Lakes under 10 hectares ==
- Little Meatbird Lake (2.1) (67th)
