= Paroisse Ste-Anne-des-Pins =

French Catholic Church

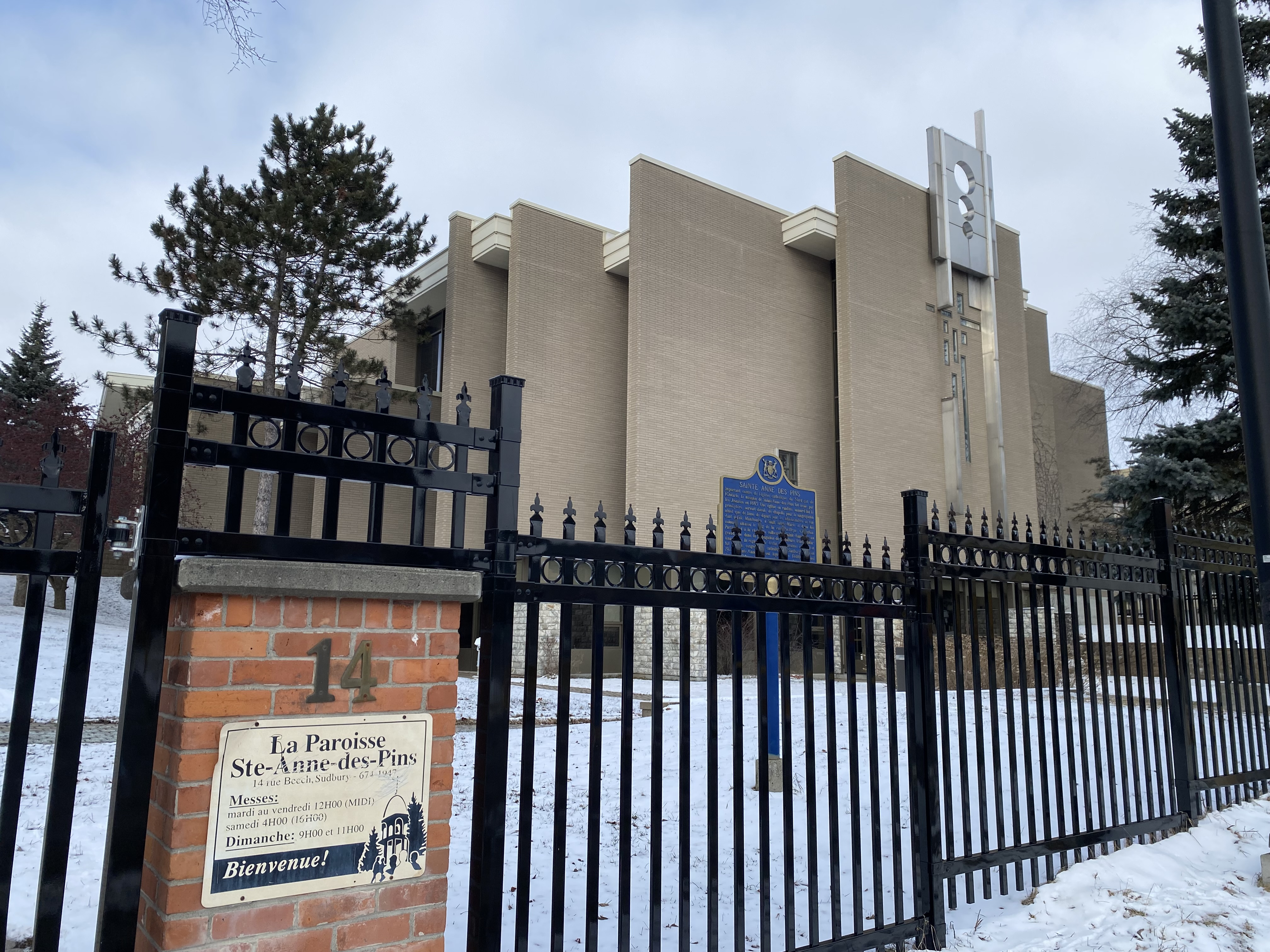
- Paroisse Ste-Anne-des-Pins from Beech street

General information
- Type: French Catholic Church
- Location: Sudbury, Ontario, 14 Beech St, Greater Sudbury, ON P3C 1Z2, Canada
- Coordinates: 46.4944°N 80.9947°W
- Completed: 1995

Technical details
- Floor area: 12 000 sqft

Design and construction
- Architecture firm: Bélanger Salach Architecture

Paroisse Ste-Anne-des-Pins is a Roman Catholic Church that emerged in downtown Sudbury, Ontario, Canada in 1883. The epoch-making edifice held high communal value and admiration from the time of its erection, as it was home to the city’s very first Francophone Catholic community. The name of the cathedral originates from the inceptive name of Sudbury: The city was originally given the name Ste-Anne-des-Pins, after the pine forest that covered its topographically rock-strewn terrain, and French-Canadian pioneer, Ste-Anne, before being given the current name of Sudbury by the Canadian Pacific Company. Noticeably, the church kept the historically felicitous name, as the first church in the area. Since as early as 1989, the historical pivot was deemed a parish, and subsequently held the title of being the one and only Roman Catholic congregation of Sudbury for nearly three decades. Since its initial establishment, Paroisse Ste-Anne-des-Pins has sustained an exceptional amount of threatening events; some more recent and dull, while others historically prominent and transformative.

== History ==
Located in Sudbury Ontario, during the year 1883, the Canadian Pacific Railways were being built, increasing the Catholic population from 193 to 376 within a year. Originally, Father Joseph Specht, who was a Jesuit priest provided Jesuit chaplains services for the expanding community. He was replaced later in March 1883 by Father Jean-Baptiste Nolin. When settling into Sudbury, Nolin built a stable, where he then built a rectory and used the attic as a chapel, calling it Ste-Anne-des-Pins. While the rectory/chapel housed the Jesuits and attended to roughly fifty families, Nolin made adjustments to expand Ste-Anne-des-Pins into a school to support the children's education. By 1887, the Catholic population grew so high that the church had to be rebuilt. With Father Hormidas Caron as the director, the construction was completed two years later, and the new church was divided into a school, a church, and a parish hall to meet the needs of the community.

In 1894, on Good Friday of March 23, the city’s church, only four years younger than Sudbury itself, burst into flames. The flame of a candle within the church caught onto a curtain and precipitated the near-total loss of the premises. Father Toussaint Lussier, parish priest, along with a few others present at the time of the incident, attempted to choke the fire, but only one of the two primitive statues and a few other artifacts were rescued from the entire underinsured establishment. Community engagement and congregation collaboration customarily led to the rapid reestablishment of local churches, as this was not an uncommon occurrence. Ste-Anne-des-Pins was no exception.

In 1914, the Sainte-Anne church was expanded due to the English-speaking parish becoming more dominant. Up until the year 1928, the church accommodated French, English, and now Ukrainian Catholics that did not have rites towards religion, and offered their priests a space for Religious Ukrainian Services. The Sainte-Anne parish was thus divided a total of three times, creating the Christ the King Church, Saint-Jean-de-Brébeuf in 1930, and Saint-Eugène in 1949, causing Sainte-Anne church to have 1200 remaining families.

Despite its animated reconstruction, another fire assailed the building on June 27, 1992, induced by arson. An individual provoked the conflagration by igniting a shed behind the church, eradicating it once again. Despite the bell tower and some of the ossature surviving the event, engineers reckoned them unsafe as a consequence of trauma from the heat of the fire. This left the reconstruction and rejuvenation of Paroisse Ste-Anne-des-Pins in the hands of Bélanger Salach Architecture, who is responsible for how it stands today.

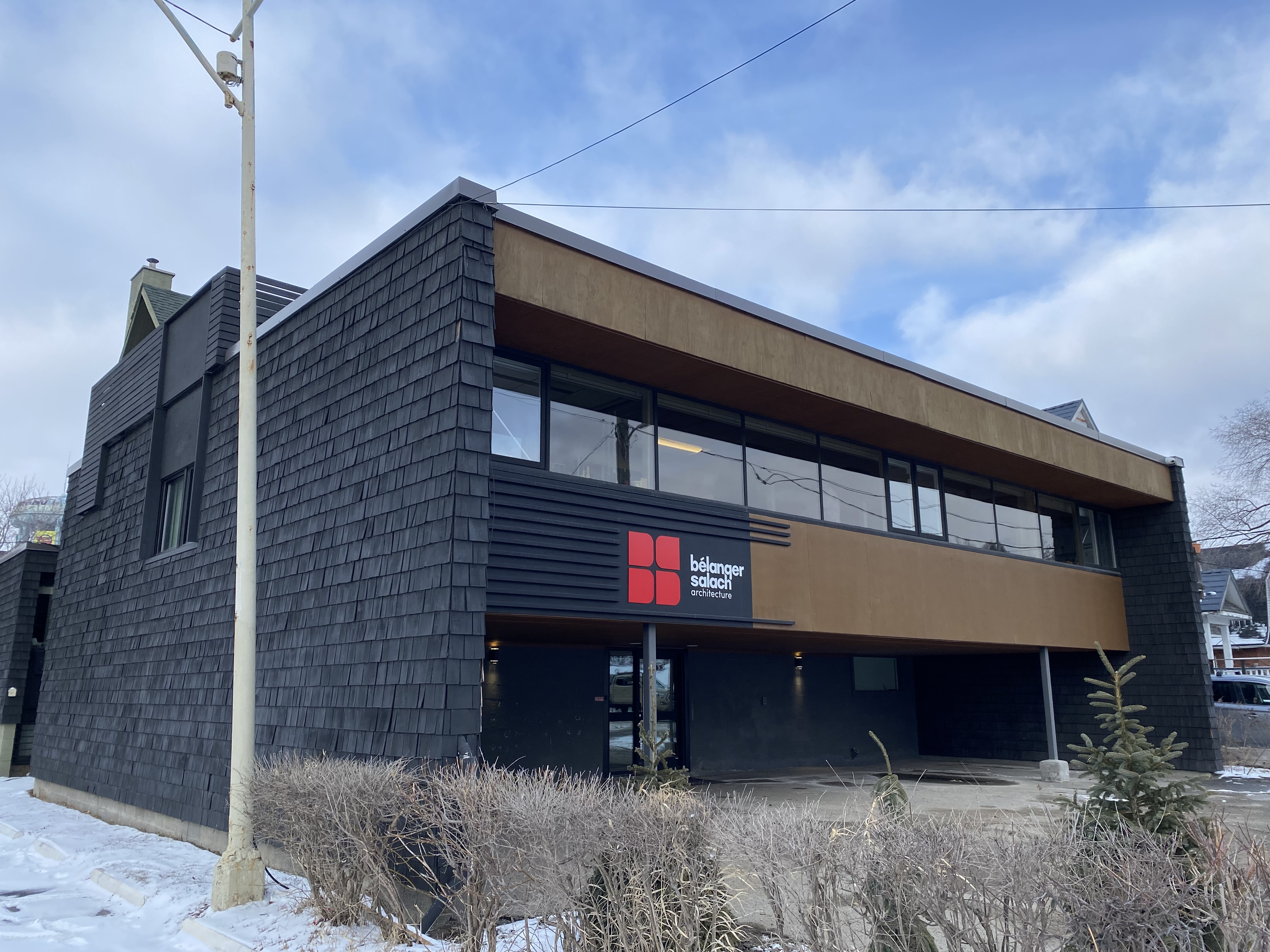
Bélanger Salach Architecture Firm Building, 2024

Louis Bélanger, a partner of the aforementioned firm, played a salient role in the redesign of the church: The bishop of the epoch sent him to Belgium to examine the reconstruction of European churches, to most efficaciously reconstruct the church's structure all while reviving its sacred core. His analysis led him to the discovery that the churches of Europe offered a much more residential sentiment when compared to the colossal memorials found in the locality of Greater Sudbury. This notion of churches that resemble what is discerned as houses in North America or Canada is depicted by them as “Domus Ecclesiae”, otherwise known as House of the Church. Diverse selective and distinctive attributes of said European churches were adopted and replicated in the vernacular of this modern iteration of the cathedral.

In May 2022, the small, French-speaking church was vandalized. The statue of Virgin Mary and Baby Jesus were decapitated in the courtyard of Ste-Anne-des-Pins. This was the church's third encounter with vandalism of the statues within six years. In October 2015, the head of the Baby Jesus statue went missing and was replaced temporarily the following year by a handmade terra cotta sculpture from a local artist. The original head was later returned to the church and put back onto the statue.

=== Saint Anne ===
According to Ste-Anne-des-Pins, Saint Anne (meaning grace) and her husband, Joachim, were experiencing despair as they could not conceive children. Eventually, God heard their prayers and fasts and sent an angel to inform them that Anne was now pregnant with a girl. Later, she gave birth who is known as the Virgin Mary. When Mary did not need the help of her parents anymore, Anne and Joachim took her to the Temple Jerusalem as they made a vow to give her back to God. The spouses then went silent and returned home to rest in peace, with shrines dedicated to Anne.

== Sacraments ==
- Baptism
- Reconciliation
- Eucharist
- Confirmation
- Matrimony
- Anointing of the Sick
