= Vale Living with Lakes Centre =

General information
- Status: Completed 2011
- Location: 840 Ramsey Lake Rd, Sudbury, Ontario
- Client: Laurentian University

Technical details
- Floor area: 2,643m² (28,441 sq ft)

Design and construction
- Architects: JL. Richards & Associates and Busby Perkins & Will Architects
- Structural engineer: JL. Richards & Associates
- Civil engineer: JL. Richards & Associates

Website
- https://www3.laurentian.ca/livingwithlakes/

The Vale Living with Lakes Centre is a research center for The Cooperative Freshwater Ecology Unit in Sudbury, Ontario, Canada. The centre consists of 2 buildings totalling 2,643m² (28,441 sq ft). The 2 storey main building (2,125m² / 22,865 sq ft) contains offices, laboratories, and teaching/meeting spaces. The second building also known as the Watershed Centre (518m² / 5,576 sq ft) contains field crew operations, storage, and specialized facilities.

The Vale Living with Lakes Centre was designed by Peter Busby of Busby, Perkins + Will in collaboration with Jeff Laberge from J.L. Richards and Associates who provided engineering and architectural services. The scientists and clients of the Living with Lakes Centre wanted the project to improve the site through the construction of the centre. Therefore, by designing with sustainable landscaping strategies and the design of stormwater management systems, the water leaves the site cleaner than when it entered ensuring the Living with Lakes Centre does not harm the waters of Lake Ramsey through its operation.

The design team worked in collaboration with the scientists that would later occupy the building to optimize the architectural conditions to their standards to produce the Living with Lakes Centre. This integrated design process required the equal input of people with engineering specialties, design specialties, and ecosystem regeneration specialties to benefit the project as a whole. During the design process the integrated group had two concepts that drove the project: good architecture equals good engineering and no one knows more than everyone. These concepts provide insight into the thought process through the design and build of the Vale Living with Lakes Centre which reiterates the importance of an integrated design approach.

== History ==
The city of Sudbury has a history of nickel and copper mining which resulted in environmental damage, including the clear-cutting of forests and acid rain. Due to this mining history the vegetation in the region was damaged, and new vegetation could not grow in the acidic soil, resulting in the fauna in the area also being negatively impacted. Also, the lakes and water systems in the area became acidified resulting in a drastic loss of biodiversity in the Sudbury area.

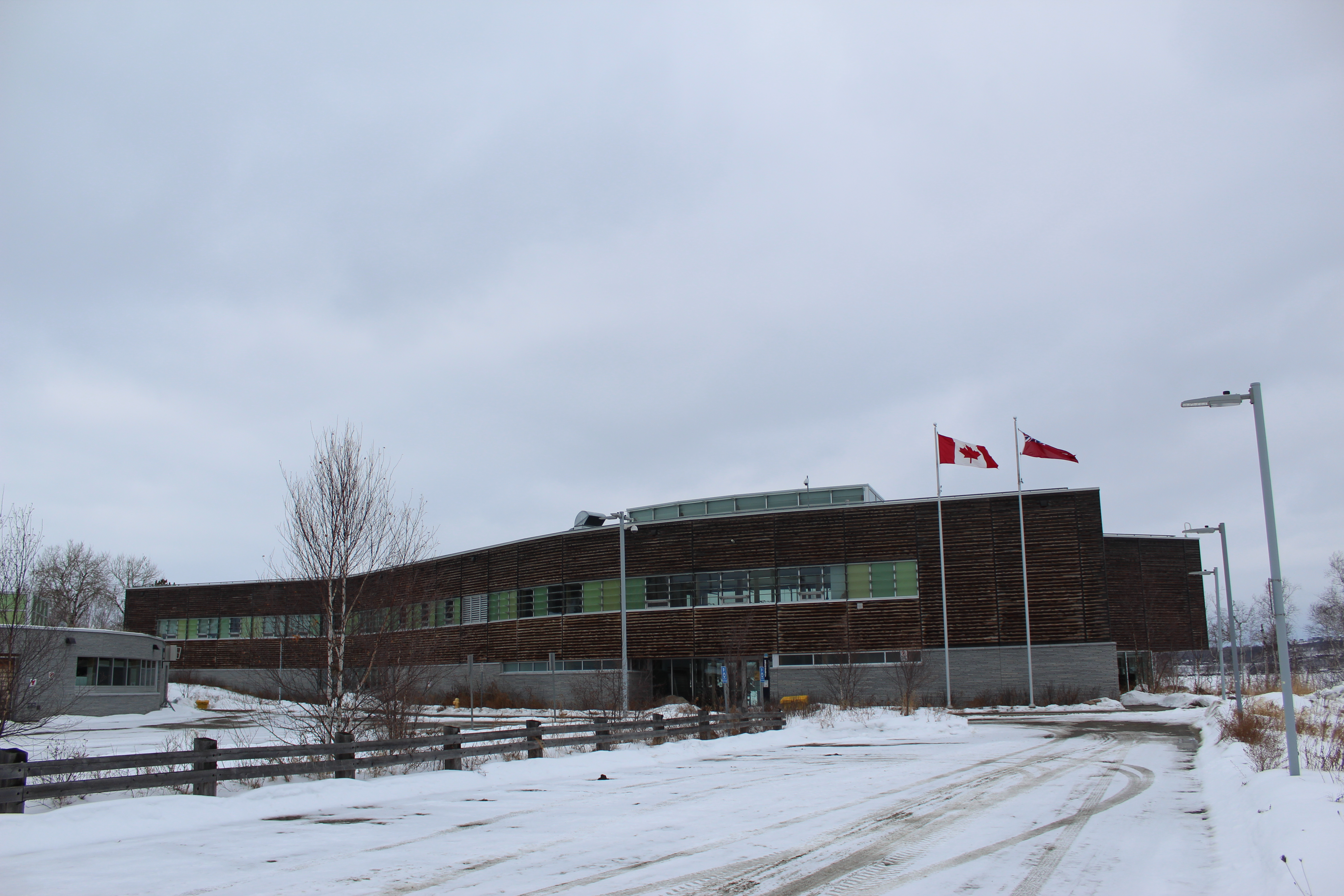
View of the Vale Living with Lakes Centre from the parking lot during winter.

In the late 1970s, the City of Sudbury started regreening efforts in the city to remediate the damaged landscape through the human intervention of distributing lime across the barren landscape to balance the acidic soil to allow vegetation to grow once again. The acidification of lakes in the area due to acid rain resulted in a lack of biology making it an obvious choice for the research of lake remediation. Thus resulting in the Vale Living with Lakes Centre which houses the Cooperative Freshwater Ecology Unit.

The Cooperative Freshwater Ecology Unit was in need of a new office space for research after the old 1940’s cabins they used for research became too run down. This group researches stressors that can affect the health of water-based ecosystems in the North which includes climate change, invasive species, and loss of biodiversity, making Ramsey Lake in Sudbury a great location for research.

== Sustainability ==
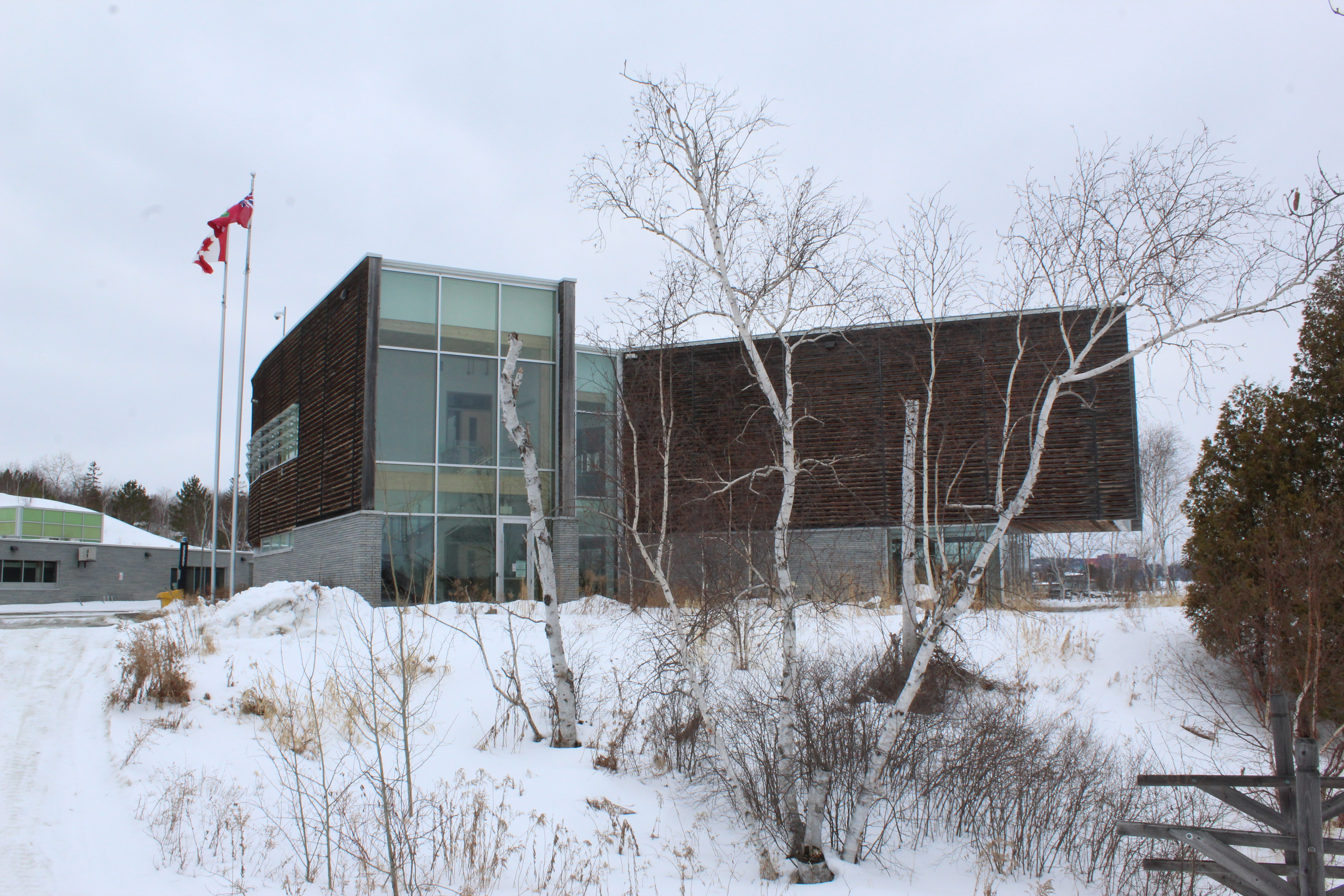
Side view of the Vale Living with Lakes Centre during winter

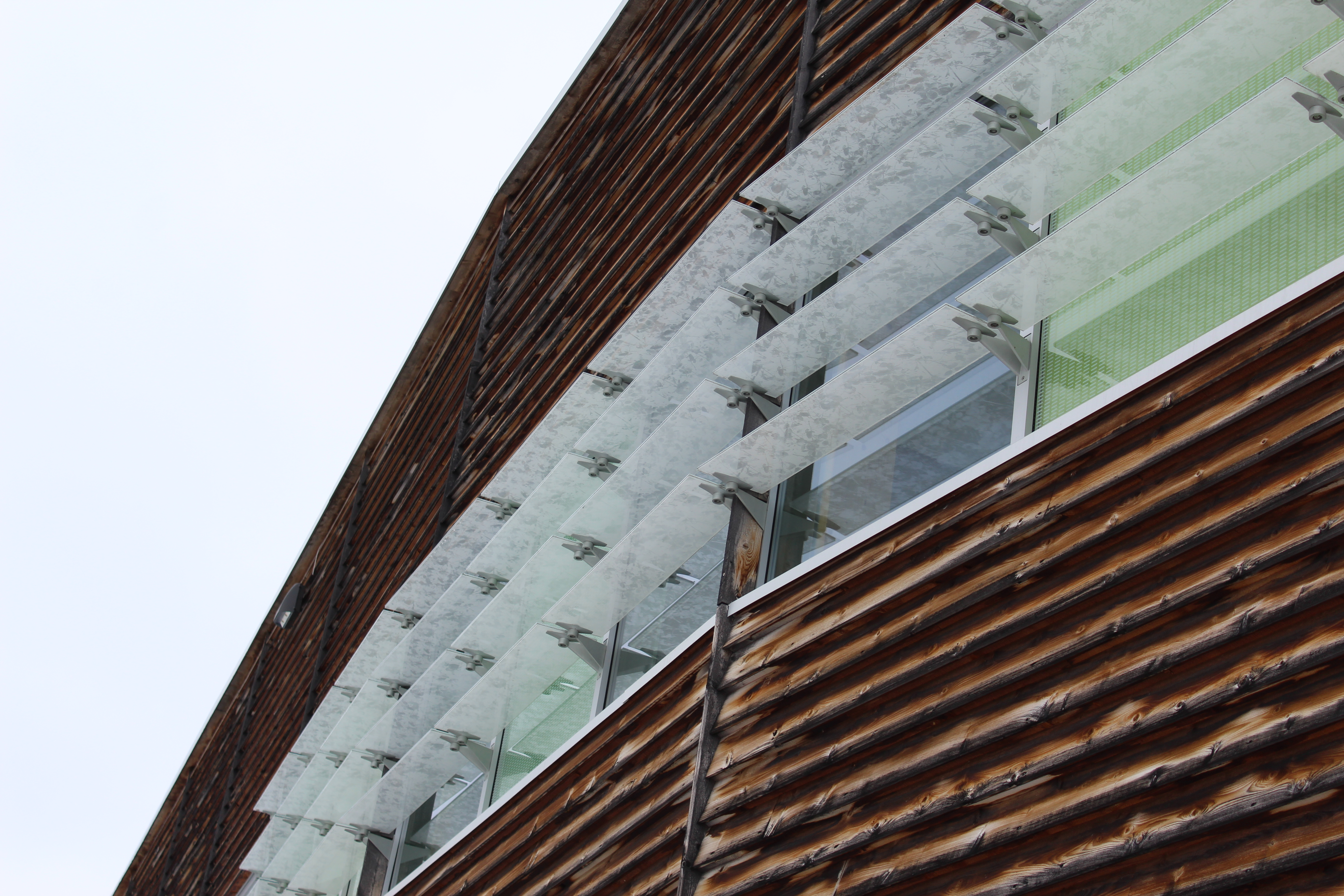
Exterior solar shading fins on a window of the Vale Living with Lakes Centre

The Vale Living with Lakes Centre was certified LEED platinum in 2014 and received an OAA Sustainable Design Excellence Award in 2015. The building uses locally sourced materials including Jack Pine glulam beams from Chapleau, limestone for cladding and landscaping, and white cedar cladding from Manitoulin Island. Wood was the primary building material for the center including engineered wood beams for the primary structure, and wood panelling for the lateral structure. Thus resulting in a Green Building Wood Design Award from Wood Works! in 2012.

The centre's design for energy preservation and the use of sustainable energy sources derived from the idea that the facility would reduce the operating costs of the building to save funding for research. The Living with Lakes Centre uses an on-site geothermal heating and cooling system consisting of 40 geothermal wells that feed 3 heat exchangers that connect to the radiant in-floor heating system to provide sustainable heating and cooling for the centre. This sustainable energy source saves money from operating costs and provides renewable heating and cooling without carbon emissions. Natural daylighting and ventilation strategies were also designed and implemented in the Living with Lakes building to reduce the energy requirements from artificial lighting and fans. The buildings south-facing orientation and the placement of windows result in a naturally well-lit building. The use of exterior solar shading fins allows the sun to naturally light the building without overheating the interior during warm months. The angling of the shading fins act to reflect light to minimize unwanted heat gains, reducing cooling requirements during warm months. The Living with Lakes Centre also uses a super-insulated envelope to reduce thermal losses, which minimizes the amount of heating and cooling required.

There are green roofs on both of the Living with Lakes Centre buildings which reduce water runoff to minimize the chance of flooding during extreme weather events. The vegetation provides added roof insulation to minimize heating requirements, and it is planted with blueberries which provide habitat and food for native bird species of the Sudbury area.

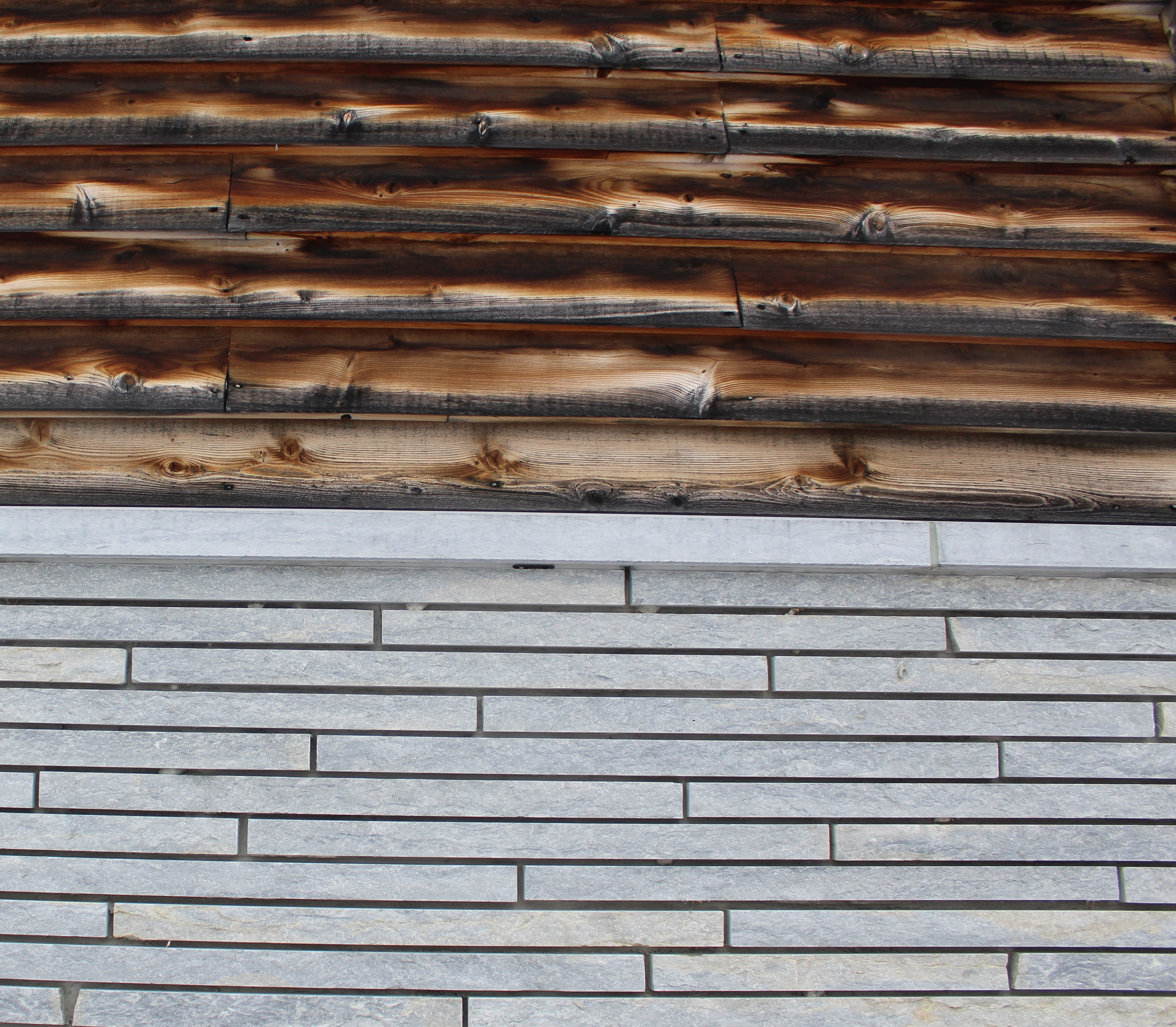
Wood and limestone facade of the Vale Living with Lakes Centre

An important element of the Vale Living with Lakes Centre is the sustainable landscape strategies that act to preserve and improve the shoreline of Ramsey Lake so as not to further worsen the existing conditions. Stormwater management strategies are designed to filter and treat water runoff on-site to avoid contaminated water from running into Ramsey Lake, Sudbury’s water reservoir. Permeable paving was used in the parking area which acts to divert stormwater to the on-site bioswales that uses vegetation to filter the water and directs the runoff into a pond on-site that acts as a water reservoir which further filters and treats the stormwater runoff using native plant species that naturally treat contaminants. Water from the pond reservoir is then recycled and used as greywater for flushing toilets, and cleaning equipment, thus reducing potable water consumption. Limestone was chosen as a primary landscaping material to gradually improve the acidic Ramsey Lake through the limestone’s ability to reduce acidity over time.

== Awards ==
- 2008 Holcim Award for Sustainable Construction, Bronze Award
- 2012 Wood Works! Green Building Wood Design Award
- 2012 Canadian Consulting Engineering Awards
- 2014 LEED Platinum Certified- LEED Canada for New Construction and Major Renovations
- 2015 OAA Design Excellence Award
- 2015 OAA Sustainable Design Excellence Award
