= Thunder Pride =

Annual LGBT event in Thunder Bay, Canada

Thunder Pride is an annual LGBT pride parade and festival, staged in Thunder Bay, Ontario, Canada.

Following the launch of a planning committee in 2010, the event was staged for the first time in 2011. For the first two years it consisted solely of a community festival, with a parade added to the event calendar for the first time in 2013. It was only the second pride festival ever launched in the Northern Ontario region, following Sudbury Pride in 1997.

The parade route follows Red River Road, from Waverley Park near Lakehead University's Bora Laskin Faculty of Law campus to Marina Park on the waterfront.

At the 2018 festival, organizers took special security precautions following the disruption of several small-town Pride events in Southern Ontario earlier in the year. No disruptions were reported in the end.
