= Arthur Townend =

- Born: November 8, 1924; Cuba
- Died: July 9, 2005 (aged 80); Sudbury, Ontario
- Occupation: Architect
- Spouse: Mary Evelyn Sheahan (m. 1950)
- Children: Gordon Townend; Arthur Townend; DeborahTownend; Mary Townend; Barbara Townend; John Townend; Jane Townend
- Projects: Fielding Memorial Chapel of St. Mark; Tom Davies Square; Science North; Laurentian Hospital; Northeastern Ontario Regional Cancer Centre

Sidney Arthur Townend (November 8, 1924 – July 9, 2005) was a Cuban-born Canadian architect. Based in Sudbury, Ontario, he designed a number of Sudbury buildings, such as Fielding Memorial Chapel of St. Mark, the Sudbury Civic Square and the Laurentian Hospital (now known as the north tower of Health Sciences North).

== Education and personal life ==
Townend was born in Cuba in 1924. He spent his early childhood in Jamaica where he studied at Munro College. In 1942 he arrived to Montreal, Canada, and was sent to the Prairies to contribute to the war effort of World War II. The same year, he was infected by polio and received treatments at the Montreal General Hospital. He attended McGill University School of Architecture in 1943 where he graduated in 1948. He then moved to Sudbury where he married Mary Evelyn Sheahan in 1950. He practiced architecture in Sudbury until his retirement in 1988. He was a member of many social clubs around Sudbury, including the Sudbury Yacht Club and the Idylwylde Golf Club.

Townend died on July 9, 2005 in Sudbury, Ontario.

== Career ==
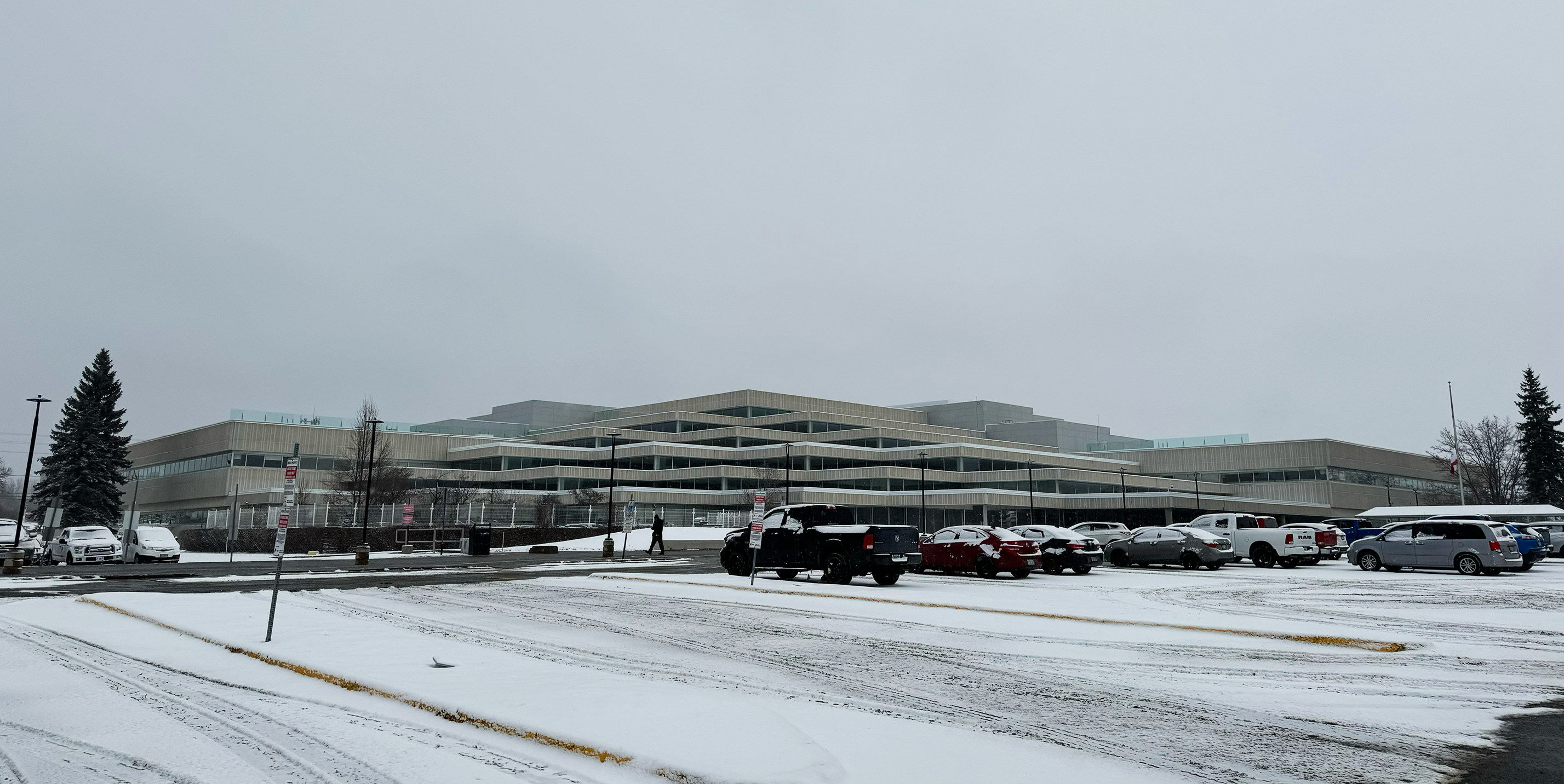
The Taxation Data Centre in Sudbury, Ontario (1977) Health Sciences North, including the Cancer Center (front) (1974) and the North Tower (back) (1991) Health Sciences North, including the Cancer Centre (front) (1991) and the North Tower (rear) (1974) The Northern Ontario Health Sciences School (NOHSS) Building on Regent Street (1966). The red panels on the facades were added later.

Townend practiced architecture from 1948 until his retirement in 1988. In 1948 he started his career as a draftsman for Louis Fabbro where he worked on the Sudbury St. Joseph's Health Centre. In 1955, Townend became partner at Fabbro's firm, which became Fabbro & Townend. He left the firm in 1964 and shortly after partnered with John Stefura to form the firm Townend and Stefura (now known as Bélanger Salach architecture). He is recognized as the architect partner in charge of many buildings in Sudbury ranging from civic to cultural public buildings, and 17 private residences. He was a member of the governing council of the Ontario Association of Architects.

=== Bélanger Salach Architecture ===
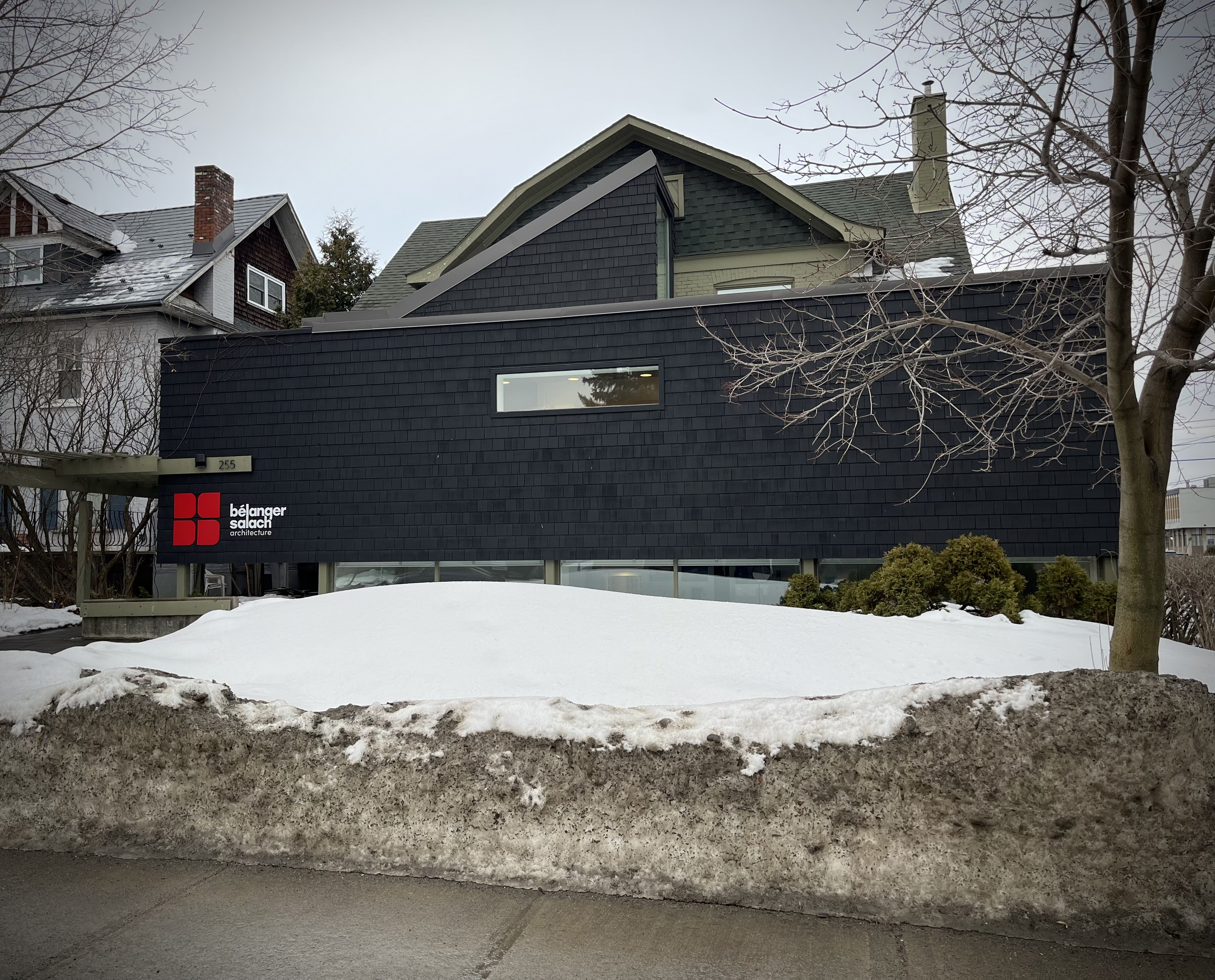
Bélanger Salach Architecture office

Bélanger Salach Architecture is an architectural firm in Greater Sudbury, Ontario, Canada founded in 1964 by Arthur Townend and John Stefura. Their projects include institutional, cultural and educational facilities such as Tom Davies Square, Place des Arts, and the Fielding Memorial Chapel of St. Mark. The firm is currently led by Louis Bélanger and Amber Salach.

Bélanger Salach was established as Townend and Stefura in 1964 as a partnership between architects Arthur Townend and John Stefura. Prior to the establishment of the firm, Townend was in a partnership with Louis Fabbro from 1955 to 1964. The following year, John Baleshta joined the firm, with Blaine Nicholls joining In 1979 and Rick Yallowega joining in 1993. The firm became Bélanger Salach in 2007.

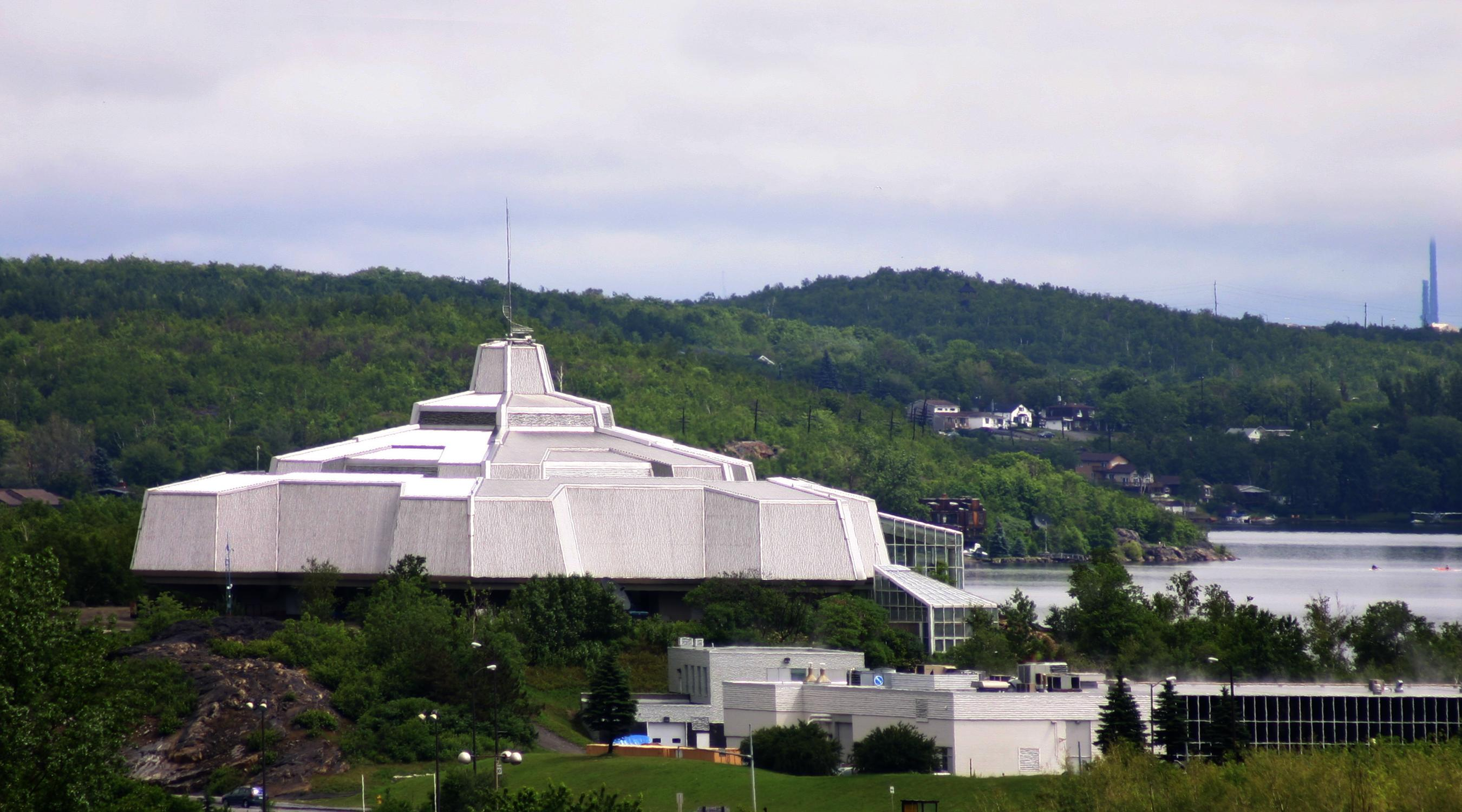
Science North

- The Fielding Memorial Chapel of St. Mark, completed in 1968 for Thornloe University. The chapel was designated as a heritage site and received the Ontario Association of Architects Landmark Award in 2017.
- Tom Davies Square, completed in 1977 for the City and Region of Sudbury as Civic Square. City Hall of Sudbury from 1977 until 2000 and Greater Sudbury since 2001.
- Science North, in association with Moriyama Teshima Architects, completed in 1984. The project received the Governor General’s Medal for Architecture in 1986.
- St. David Catholic Elementary School, completed for the Sudbury Catholic District School Board. Received the Ontario Woodworks Institutional Wood Design Award for projects under C$10 million in 2017.
- Laurentian University Student Centre in association with Gow Hastings Architects. Received the Sudbury Design Award in 2018 and the Wood Works Northern Ontario Excellence Award in 2021.
- Place Des Arts in association with Moriyama Teshima Architects. Received the Sudbury Design Award in 2016, the APR Urban Design & Architecture Award and two Grands Prix du Design Awards in 2023.

== Projects ==
- 1957 : Sudbury Hydro Building, located in downtown Sudbury at the corner of Larch and Young street
- 1958 : Federal Building, build for the Government of Canada, located in downtown Sudbury, along Lisgar street, between Cedar and Elm street
- 1960 : Sudbury Yacht Club Building, an A-frame building located by Ramsey Lake
- 1966 : Northern Ontario Health Sciences School (NOHSS) Building, located on Regent street by Lily Creek
- 1969 : Thorneloe Chapel, now known as the Fielding Memorial Chapel of St. Mark
- 1969 : Our Lady of Hope Church, which was made to resemble Noah's Ark
- 1974 : Laurentian Hospital, now known as the north tower of Health Sciences North
- 1977 : Civic Centre, now known as Tom Davies Square
- 1977 : Taxation Data Centre, in partnership with Page and Steele, located at the corner of Notre-Dame and Lasalle boulevard
- 1984 : Science North, in partnership with Moriyama & Teshima
- 1991 : Northeastern Ontario Regional Cancer Centre, now part of Health Sciences North
