= Bell Park (Sudbury) =

Municipal park in Greater Sudbury, Ontario, Canada

- Parc Bell (French)
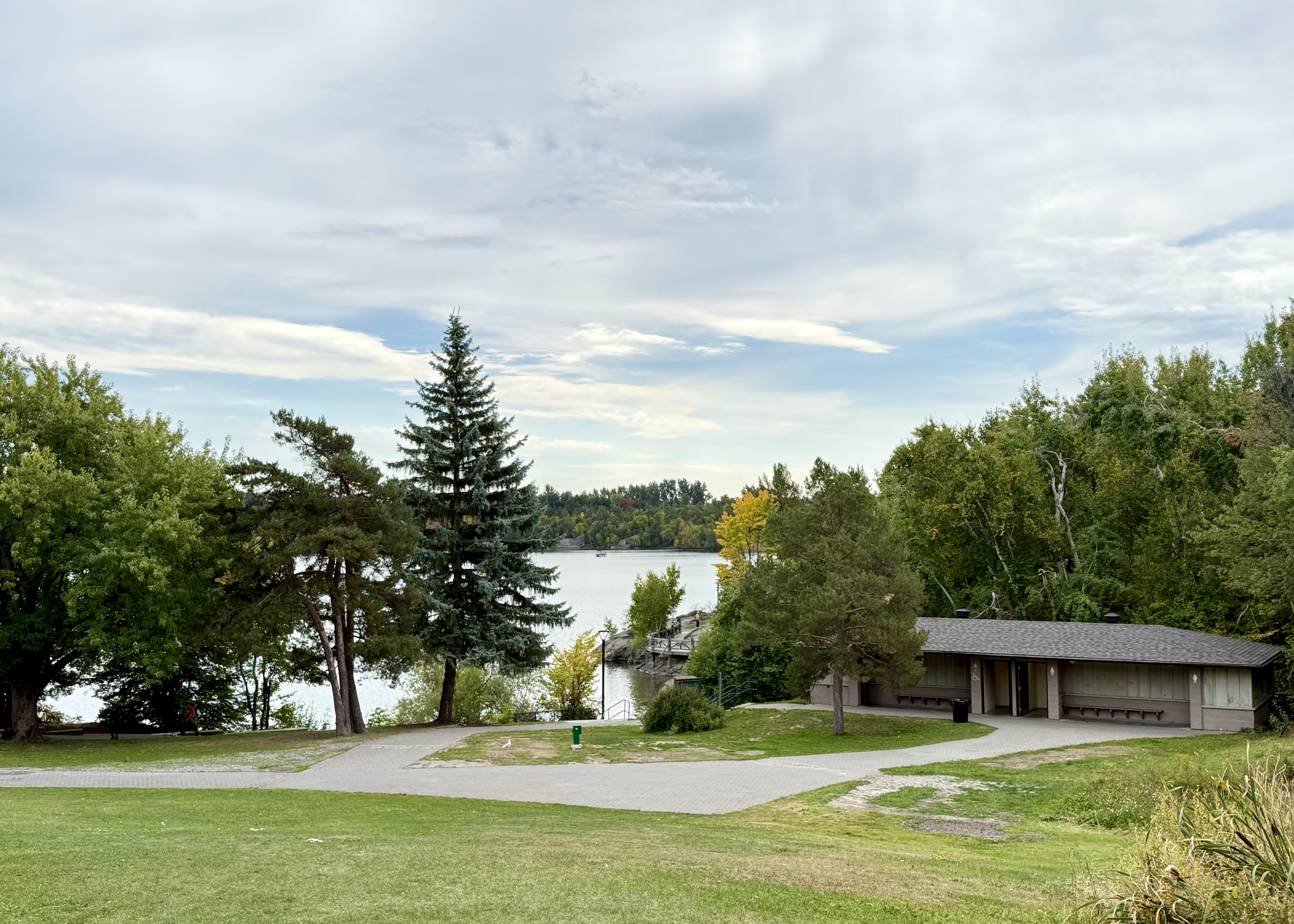
- Interactive map of Bell Park
- Type: Urban Park
- Location: Greater Sudbury, Ontario, Canada
- Coordinates: 46°28′30″N 80°59′32″W
- Created: 1926
- Owner: Greater Sudbury
- Operator: Greater Sudbury Parks and Recreation Services
- Website: Official page

Bell Park (French: Parc Bell) is a municipal park in Sudbury, Ontario, Canada. Bell Park is an urban waterfront park, with beaches, gardens, two gazebos, playgrounds, an amphitheatre, and recreational facilities. Bell Park was established in 1926 and is based on a donation of land from lumber baron William J. Bell to the Town of Sudbury. It is one of the largest parks in Sudbury.

Bell Park is located to the south of downtown Sudbury on the western shore of Ramsey Lake. It stretches southwest from McNaughton Street to Science North, and it is bounded on the west by Paris Street and on the east by Ramsey Lake.

== History ==
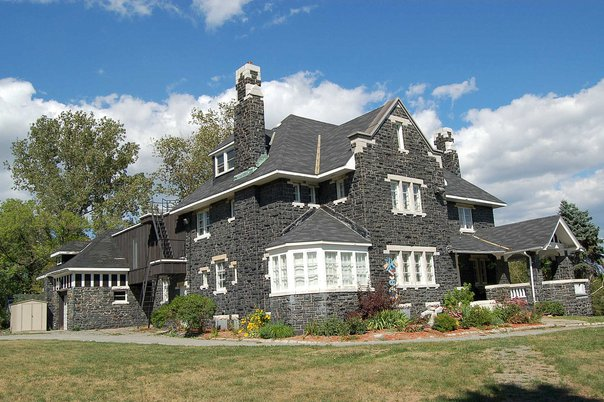
Belrock Mansion

In 1896, William J. Bell moved to Sudbury. Bell was a lumber baron who later held a controlling interest in the Spanish River Lumber Company, which operated lumber camps at Lake Wanapitei. In 1907, Bell and his wife Katherine purchased 155 acres of land stretching along the northwestern shore of Ramsey Lake. On this land, the Bells constructed their estate, Belrock. In 1926, the Bells donated 110 acres of the land to the Town of Sudbury to establish a park.

After the deaths of the Bells, Belrock was given to Sudbury Memorial Hospital in 1954. A fire gutted the mansion in 1955, but it was restored in 1967 as a Centennial Project and housed the Art Gallery of Sudbury until 2024.

As another Centennial Project, Bell Park was extended southward toward York Street and a 2,000 person amphitheatre was constructed, along with a new garden arranged in the shape of the centennial maple leaf. These efforts were led by mayor Grace Hartman, the first woman to serve as mayor of Sudbury. The amphitheatre was renamed in honour of Hartman in 2001.

In 1980, land on the southwestern edge of the park known as Bell Grove was chosen as the site for a new science centre, which opened in 1984 as Science North. A boardwalk connecting the park with Science North was completed in 1993, and was later named in honour of former mayor Jim Gordon in 2003. The boardwalk was replaced in 2025.

In 2007, the Centennial garden was removed and replaced with a new flower garden. The amphitheatre was replaced with a new outdoor stage in 2010, which is also named in Hartman’s honour.

== Points of Interest ==
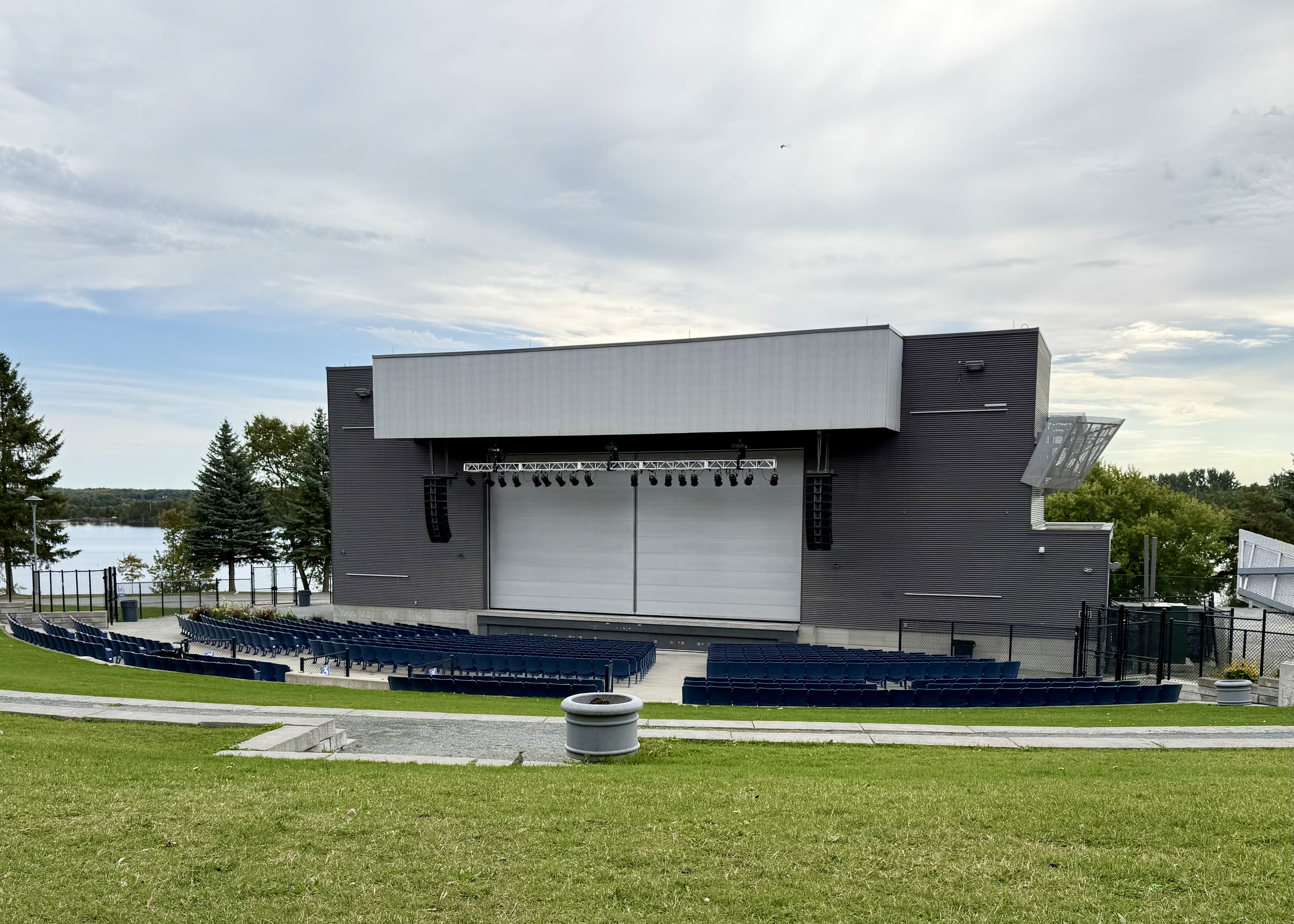
Grace Hartman Amphitheatre

=== Bell Gazebos ===
Two public Gazebos exist in the park, the William Bell Gazebo and the Katherine Bell Gazebo. The William Bell Gazebo is the larger of the two, and sits south of the main beach. The Katherine Bell Gazebo is located along the boardwalk, north of the amphitheatre. Since 1996, the gazebos have hosted the free Peter Schneider Concert Series.

=== Grace Hartman Amphitheatre ===
The Grace Hartman Amphitheatre is located in the southern portion of the park, east of York Street. It has a capacity of 1,963 people. The amphitheatre serves as the main stage for Northern Lights Festival Boréal, an annual music festival that has been held in the park since 1972.

=== Pitter Patter Park ===
The outdoor gym "Pitter Patter Park" was gifted to the city in 2021 by New Metric Media, the production company behind the locally-filmed Letterkenny and Shoresy.

=== Sudbury Mining Heritage Sculpture ===
Sudbury Mining Heritage Sculpture

The Sudbury Mining Heritage Sculpture, designed by Timothy Schmalz, was unveiled in 2001. The monument, which celebrates the mining history of Sudbury, is a two sided bronze arch depicting the past, present, and future of mining that merges into two giant hands leading into the rock of the Canadian Shield. The monument is located to the south of the amphitheatre.

== Recreation ==
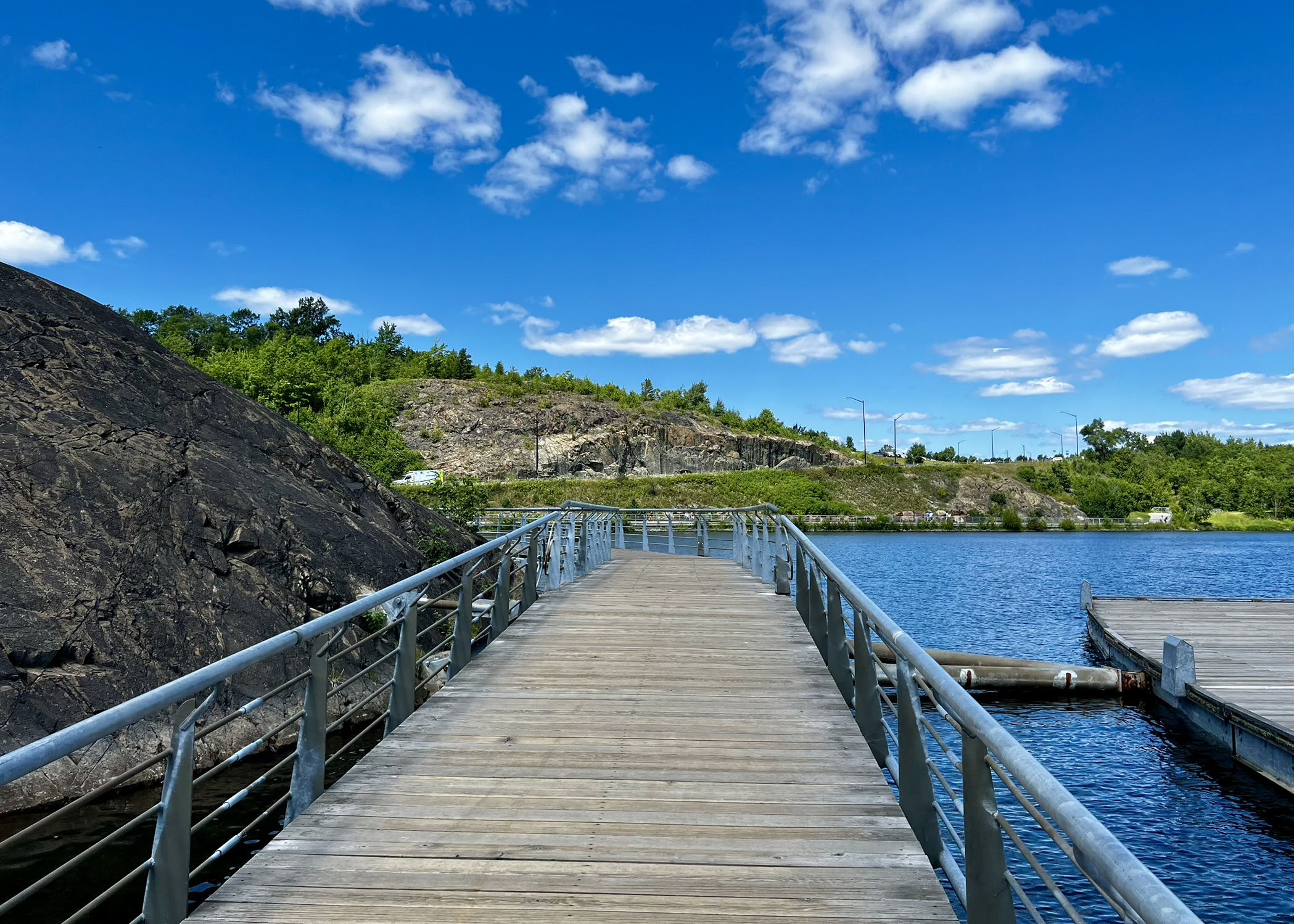
Jim Gordon Boardwalk

The Bell Park Main Beach is located on Ramsey Lake, and it includes a canteen as well as a playground. The beach was awarded with a Blue Flag in 2015, one of two Blue Flag beaches in Sudbury. There are three smaller, unsupervised beaches in the park, Amphitheatre Beach, Maintenance Beach, and New Beach. A floating water park has been installed at Amphitheatre Beach since 2022.

In winter, a skating path is opened on Ramsey Lake, which stretches from the Sudbury Canoe Club to the Northern Water Sports Centre.

== See also ==
- List of contemporary amphitheaters
