= Art Gallery of Sudbury =

- Galerie d’art de Sudbury
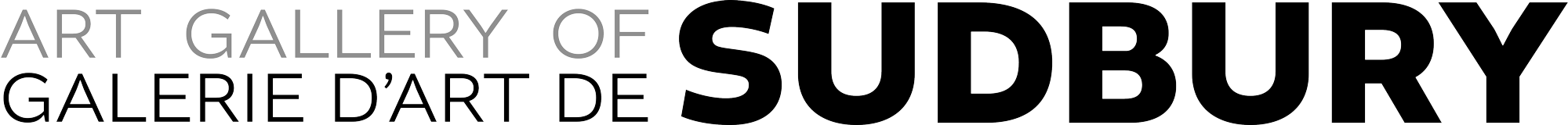
- Former name: Laurentian University Museum and Art Centre (LUMAC)
- Established: 1967
- Location: 172 Elgin Street; Sudbury, Ontario; P3E 3N5
- Coordinates: 46°29′19″N 80°59′38″W
- Type: Art museum
- Collection size: 2,100
- Director: Demetra Christakos
- Curator: Demetra Christakos
- Website: artsudbury.org

The Art Gallery of Sudbury (AGS) is a public art gallery in Greater Sudbury, Ontario, Canada. Established by Laurentian University as the Laurentian University Museum and Art Centre (LUMAC) in 1967, the gallery was located in the historic Belrock Mansion until 2025. It is currently operated from a temporary location on Elgin Street in downtown Sudbury until the new gallery at the Cultural Hub within Tom Davies Square is completed by the end of 2028.

== History ==
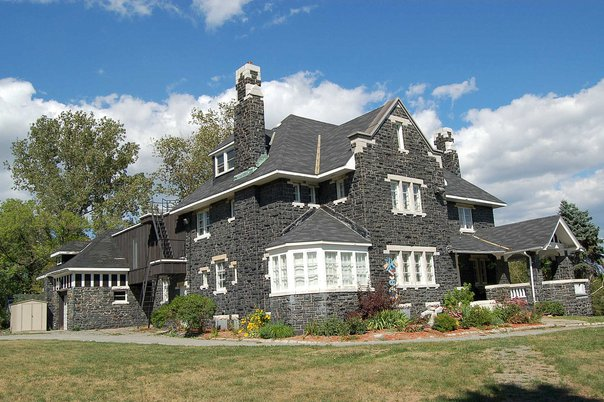
The gallery was housed in Belrock Mansion until 2025.

The gallery was established as the Laurentian University Museum and Art Centre (LUMAC) in 1967, after Belrock Mansion was transferred to the university for a symbolic price of $1. The mansion, constructed in 1906, was the home of lumber baron William J Bell and his wife Katherine.

After their deaths, the mansion was transferred to Sudbury Memorial Hospital in 1954, but a fire in 1955 left the mansion vacant until 1966. The mansion was restored by the Sudbury Centennial Museum Society and LUMAC began operating the following year. In 1997, the operations of LUMAC were transferred to a new community-based organization, and LUMAC was renamed to the Art Gallery of Sudbury.

In 2022, Laurentian University announced their intentions to sell Belrock Mansion following the University's financial restructuring, with the gallery's agreement with the university permitting them to stay until May 30, 2025. However, the gallery temporarily closed on October 12, 2023 due to structural issues with the mansion. Its move from the mansion was completed by Spring 2025, with public operations moving to a temporary location on Elgin Street, and the collections being housed by Laurentian until the new gallery is completed by the end of 2028.

== Permanent collection ==
The 2,100 work permanent collection of the gallery consists of two collections, the Art Gallery of Sudbury collection and the LUMAC collection. The LUMAC collection is held jointly in a trust between Laurentian University and the gallery. The collection includes works from Group of Seven artists Tom Thomson, A. Y. Jackson and Franklin Carmichael, as well as works from Charles Goldhamer and Norval Morrisseau.

=== Online Collection ===
Currently presented in English, French, and Inuktitut, the Collections Portal hosts 832 digitized artworks and artifacts searchable by artist, community of origin, medium, and collection. The portal contains majorly Indigenous and Northern Ontario regional artists, and hosts the following collections: Art Gallery of Sudbury (5 works), Art Gallery of Sudbury | Galerie d’art de Sudbury (629 works), Laurentian University Museum and Arts Centre (197 works), and LUMAC Collection | Collection MCAUL (1 work).

== Relocation ==
The gallery announced in 2009 that it was looking to either renovate Belrock Mansion or begin construction of a new purpose-built venue due to a lack of space. In 2010, plans were announced to begin fundraising for a new 14,000-square-foot (1,300 m^{2}) gallery building with an initial target date of 2014 and a proposed name change to the “Franklin Carmichael Gallery.” The project did not move forward as planned.

By 2018, the new gallery was proposed to be housed alongside a new main branch of the Sudbury Public Library. Initially intended to be a new 104,000-square-foot (9,700 m^{2}) building, the project was scaled down to a 65,000-square-foot (6,000 m^{2}) building before being finalized as a cultural hub within Tom Davies Square. The project was approved by the Greater Sudbury City Council in November of 2023. The 2010 proposed name change was revisited, approving a new name (the Franklin Carmichael Art Gallery of Sudbury) upon its move to the Cultural Hub in 2028. The art gallery itself will be located on the lower four storeys of 199 Larch Street.

== See also ==
- Belrock Mansion
