= Tom Davies Square =

City hall of Greater Sudbury, Ontario

Coordinates: 46.49021°N 80.99018°W

Tom Davies Square _{Place Tom Davies (French)}
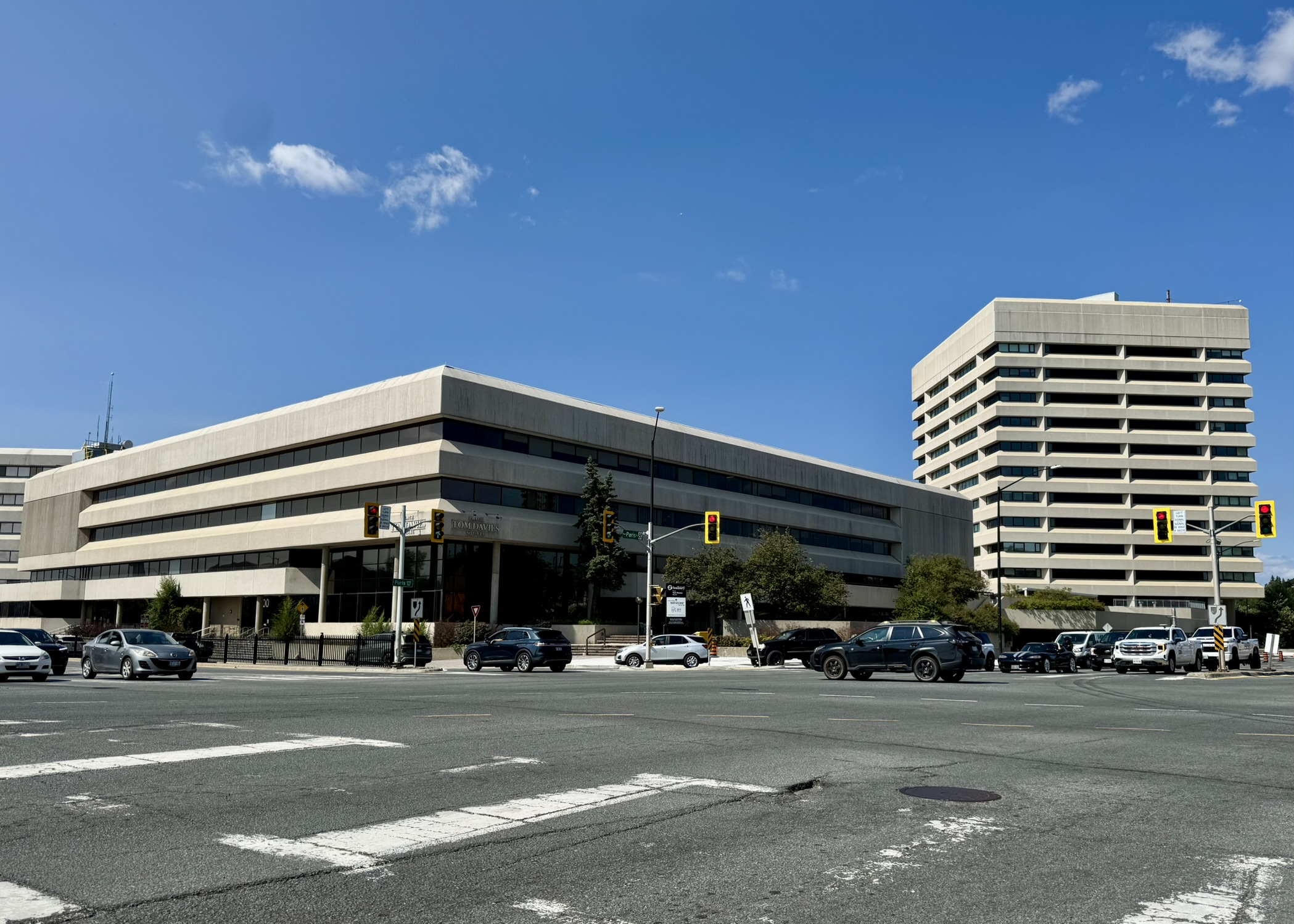
- Tom Davies Square, 2025
- Interactive map of the Tom Davies Square _{Place Tom Davies (French)} area

General information
- Architectural style: Modernism
- Location: Sudbury, Ontario, 200 Brady Street
- Construction started: 1973
- Completed: 1977
- Owner: City of Greater Sudbury

Design and construction
- Architects: Arthur Townend; John Stefura
- Architecture firm: Townend, Stefura, Baleshta and Nicholls

Tom Davies Square (French: Place Tom-Davies) is the city hall of Greater Sudbury, Ontario.

== History ==
Built in the late 1970s and originally known as Civic Square or 'Place-Civique' in French, the building was part of an urban renewal movement toward transforming the city's visual image by investing in modern architecture. The square consists of a triangular main building with its right angle facing the corner of Brady and Paris Streets and a glass-walled hypoteneuse facing onto an outdoor plaza in the centre of the complex. This building contains the city hall proper, its administrative offices and the city council chambers. A diamond-shaped second building located to the west once contained the Sudbury Public School Board and the Sudbury Public Library's Archives branch. It now houses the headquarters of the Greater Sudbury Police Service.

Another similar shaped but taller building at 199 Larch, housing provincial government offices, was added to the northeast corner of the site several years later. Completing the square is a fourth building in similar materials, built in a rectangular shape with modern colonnade breezeway, housing Bell Canada offices.

The complex was designed by the local architecture firm Townend, Stefura, Baleshta and Nicholls, with the lead architects being Arthur Townend and John Stefura.

Prior to the completion of the current facility, the former city hall was so overcrowded that the civic administration was operating out of several different downtown office buildings, and council meetings had to be held in the auditorium of the Sudbury Public Library's Mackenzie branch.

The facility was renamed in 1997 in honour of Tom Davies, the retiring chairman of the Regional Municipality of Sudbury.

== Redevelopment ==
In 2017, Greater Sudbury City Council began accepting bids for a construction project to redesign the complex's central plaza, although all bids received came in significantly higher than the city had budgeted for the project. The city allocated the additional funding necessary, and the project was completed in 2019.

In 2023, the city council explored a proposal to shift most city government operations into the now-underused tower building at 199 Larch, while retrofitting the current council building on Brady into a cultural facility that would house the main branch of the Greater Sudbury Public Library and the Art Gallery of Sudbury. The project was approved by city council in November 2023, and received $25 million in funding assistance from the federal government in September 2024.
