= St. Joseph's Health Centre, Sudbury =

Defunct hospital in Ontario, Canada

St. Joseph's Health Centre

Geography
- Location: Ontario, Canada
- Coordinates: 46°28′46″N 80°59′25″W

Organization
- Type: General

Services
- Beds: 326

History
- Former name: Sudbury General Hospital of the Immaculate Heart of Mary
- Opened: 1950
- Closed: 2010

Links
- Lists: Hospitals in Canada

The Sudbury General Hospital of the Immaculate Heart of Mary on Paris Street opened in 1950 and torn down in 2025 (most recently known as St. Joseph’s Health Centre) as the first English speaking hospital in Northern Ontario, Canada. The building can be recognized to have a brick façade with a steel beam grid system posing as the skeleton, upon inspection. Architecturally it is a simple structure and it can be concluded that due to lack of funds and urgency the quickest and cheapest model was designed.

== History ==
=== Founding ===
In 1944, the Sisters of St. Joseph of Sault Ste. Marie undertook and financed the construction of a new hospital in Greater Sudbury, Ontario after a group of physicians reached out for help. Seven acres of property was then purchased at Paris Street from Mr. and Mrs. Stafford using the Sisters' own funding. The Sisters mortgaged their homes to fortify a loan for the fabrication of the health institution.

=== Construction ===
The construction was not covered by government funding or operational revenues, and the construction of Sudbury General Hospital was completed in 1950 at a cost of $3.1 million. INCO contributed $125,000 towards the hospital which initially had 200 beds. Additions were progressively made to the building and in 1954, 100 additional beds were added to a new treatment wing. By 1960, 326 beds were contained in the hospital although it was only designed to cater 190 beds. The formal opening of a helipad took place on October 16, 1986.

=== Facilities ===
Sudbury General Hospital in due course became the regional referral centre for trauma care and surgical services. A treatment centre for crippled children opened in 1962, which was followed by various other departments including a nuclear medicine department and medical library (1964), intensive care unit (ICU), poison control and volunteer services centre (1967), neurosurgery facilities (1970) and a Pastoral Care department (1972). A new wing was constructed with new delivery rooms, operation theaters, intensive care, major emergency, x-ray and laboratory facilities and an eye, ear, nose and throat unit.

The hospital obtained a CAT scanner in 1980, and the hospital could accommodate 375 patients at the time.

=== Life of The Hospital ===
"Colloquially referred to as the General, was not officially open, but my mother was in labour," Shares Susan Foerster Cameron to sudbury.com as they were the first child to be born at the Sudbury General Hospital. Many shared their memories of the building in a Memory Lane feature hosted by sudbury.com as the structure still remains in the city. Ann Link writes about three generations of her family being born in the hospital and their experiences and sentimental attachment to the building. They also mention the parking was close to the entrance and they were satisfied with the care and services of the staff while being regular visitors of the facility. Ginette Tobodo said, "They used to do this cool thing. On the walls they painted certain colours — one color for the lab, another colour for the cardiac department, etc., and you just followed the colour to where you needed to go. Easy to find your way around."

=== Incidents ===
In 1973, several deaths occurred in the newly-built A-wing. The suspected cause was a mix up between nitrous oxide and oxygen pipes. After a fire broke out in a storage room in 1989, major smoke damage occurred to the building.

== Closure ==
All three hospitals in Sudbury were amalgamated under the Hôpital Régional de Sudbury Regional Hospital (HRSRH) in 1997 as part of provincewide health care restructuring. Construction began on a new Sudbury Regional hospital at the site of Laurentian Hospital the following year. Sudbury General Hospital ceased to operate on March 29, 2010.

=== Abandonment ===
The Sisters paid for a study to see if the building could be used as a long term care facility instead of being demolished, but it was determined that the renovations to bring the building to be too costly. After various groups proposed to demolish the building, the sisters refused to accept any offers. In May 2010, the property was sold to Panoramic Properties who planned to re-use the building as a residential apartment building. After some initial construction work, the company said in 2017 that it had “decided to take a break and regroup” at the time so it could “proceed with the condominium project at some point in time in the near future.”

=== Canada's Largest Mural ===
Muralist RISK was commissioned to paint the façade of the abandoned St. Joseph building in 2019 as part of the Up Here Festival that took place in Sudbury The 80,000 square foot mural was commissioned by Panoramic Properties for the annual urban art and music festival. Three lifts provided by Equipment World were used to get across the structure. 860 gallons of paint were provided at a discounted price and a crane was brought in to reach the hard to get areas. The Helipad and parts of the back of the building are surrounded with rough terrain and remain unpainted as it was too hard to get around. After numerous thefts and setbacks, the mural was completed on August 26, 2019, making it Canada's largest mural.

=== Demolition ===
In August 2025, demolition began on the former Sudbury General Hospital which was completed in October 2025. Plans for demolition were accelerated following two separate incidents at the abandoned site in May 2025. On May 17, a 24-year-old man was found deceased in the building, with no suspicion of foul play. Four days later on May 21, 2025, a fire broke out on the second floor, and the cause was treated as suspicious. Mayor Paul Lefebvre stated after the fire, “The ongoing risk to public safety is unacceptable, and this latest incident has made it even clearer. My patience ran out some time ago, as has the patience of the citizens of Greater Sudbury,” in relation to stalled demolition plans from the site owner, Panoramic Properties.
