= Greater Sudbury Public Library =

Greater Sudbury Public Library _{Bibliothèque publique du Grand Sudbury}
- Location: 74 Mackenzie Street; Sudbury, Ontario; P3C 4X8
- Type: public
- Branches: 13

Collection
- Items collected: business directories, phone books, maps, government publications, books, periodicals, genealogy, local history

Other information
- Website: www.sudburylibraries.ca/en/

The Greater Sudbury Public Library is a public library system in Greater Sudbury, Ontario, Canada.

The library system has 13 branches throughout the city. The main branch is called "Mackenzie" and it is located on Mackenzie Street in the downtown core. Additional branches are located in the communities of Azilda, Capreol, Chelmsford, Coniston, Copper Cliff, Dowling, Garson, Hanmer, Lively, Lo-Ellen, New Sudbury, and Onaping. A non-lending reference branch was formerly also located at Tom Davies Square, but this moved back to the Mackenzie location in 1998 after renovations expanded the Mackenzie building.

The largest library in the City of Greater Sudbury is the Mackenzie Library Main Branch. It provides access to bilingual business directories, phone books, maps, government publications, and a vast selection of books. The Reference Collection also has three special collections in its lower level: Genealogy, the Mary C. Shantz Local History Collection, and Canadian Legal Materials. The Makerspace located in the Mackenzie Library Main Branch offers sewing machines, 3D printers, and other tools for public use.

The South End Library branch was demolished in 2009 after a broken sewer lead to sections of the building's floor sinking by over 35cm and the building was declared unsafe. A new branch, designed by Yallowega Bélanger Salach Architecture, was built in the same location with a $4.9 million budget and opened in 2012. The new building includes outdoor reading and performance areas, spaces for children and teens, and meeting rooms.

== Branches ==
Branch	Image	Address	Community	Coordinates
Main Library		74 Mackenzie Street	Sudbury	46.49554°N 80.99749°W
Azilda Gilles Pelland Library		120 Saint Agnes Street	Azilda	46.55176°N 81.12010°W
Capreol Library & Citizen Service Centre		9 Morin Street	Capreol	46.70540°N 80.92085°W
Chelmsford Library & Citizen Service Centre		3502 Errington Avenue	Chelmsford	46.58059°N 81.19898°W
Coniston Library		30 Second Avenue	Coniston	46.48881°N 80.84744°W
Copper Cliff Library		11 Balsam Street	Copper Cliff	46.47457°N 81.06708°W
Dowling Library & Citizen Service Centre		79 Main Street West	Dowling	46.58562°N 81.34017°W
Garson Library & Citizen Service Centre		214 Orell Street	Garson	46.55809°N 80.86611°W
Levack / Onaping Library		1 Hillside Avenue	Onaping	46.61932°N 81.41766°W
Lively Library & Citizen Service Centre		15 Kin Drive	Lively	46.43795°N 81.14538°W
New Sudbury Library		1346 Lasalle Boulevard	Sudbury	46.52228°N 80.94672°W
South End Library		1991 Regent Street	Sudbury	46.45010°N 80.99835°W
Valley East Library & Citizen Service Centre		4100 Elmview Drive	Hanmer	46.64019°N 80.98637°W

== See also ==
- Ontario Public Libraries
- Ask Ontario
