= Lake Nepahwin =

Lake in Ontario, Canada

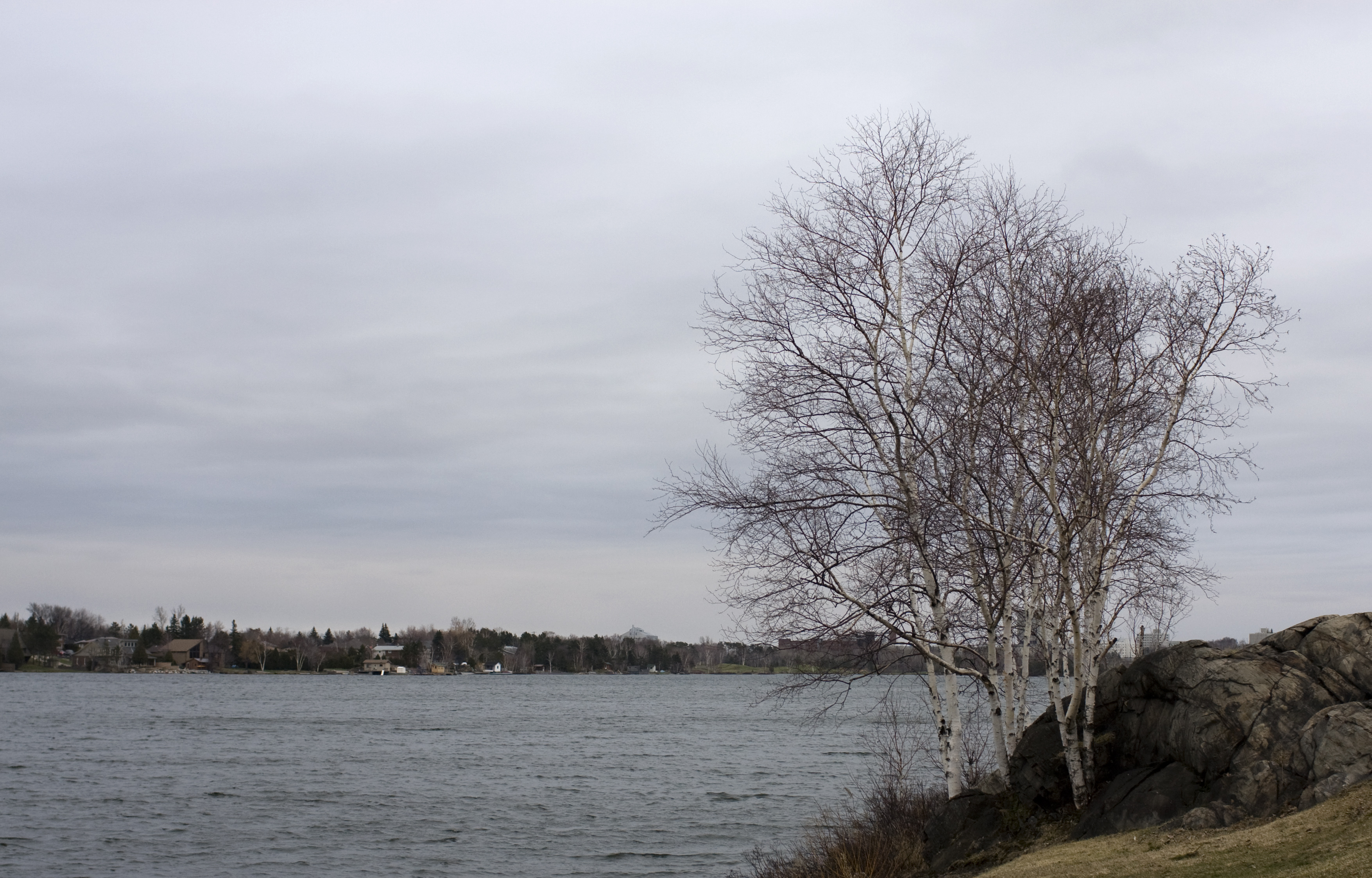

- Location within Ontario
- Location: Sudbury, Ontario
- Coordinates: 46.458°N 80.990°W
- Lake type: Glacial
- Basin countries: Canada
- Surface area: 1.28 km^{2} (0.49 sq mi)
- Max. depth: 22 m (72 ft)
- Shore length^{1}: 9.9 km (6.2 mi)
- Surface elevation: 263 m (863 ft)
- Islands: Gordon, Meda, McMahon's, Duck, two unnamed
- ^{1} Shore length is not a well-defined measure.

Lake Nepahwin is a lake in Sudbury, Ontario, located to the south of the city's downtown area.

== Origin of the name ==
Its name was derived by settlers from the Anishinaabemowin name nibaawin: the root verb nibaa (to sleep) plus the suffix win which turns it into a noun, hence "sleeping lake". The name was adopted on August 4, 1949 following a community plebiscite.

== See also ==
- List of lakes in Ontario
