= Greater Sudbury Police Service =

Greater Sudbury Police Service Service de police du Grand Sudbury (French)
- Motto: Our Community, Our Commitment

Agency overview
- Formed: 1891
- Annual budget: $ $94,062,209 (2025)

Jurisdictional structure
- Operations jurisdiction: Canada
- Legal jurisdiction: Municipal

Operational structure
- Headquarters: Greater Sudbury, Ontario
- Sworn members: 300
- Unsworn members: 150
- Elected officer responsible: The Honourable Michael Kerzner, Minister of Community Safety and Correctional Services
- Agency executive: Sara Cunningham, chief of police

Facilities
- Stations: 2
- Lockups: 2
- Boats: 2

Website
- Official website

The Greater Sudbury Police Service is the police force for the municipality of Greater Sudbury, Ontario, Canada. The Greater Sudbury area has over 3,300 square kilometres (1,300 sq mi) of Northern Ontario landscape.

The police force has over 450 employees, including over 300 police officers, and is divided into two main areas: operations and corporate services. The operations section includes the following divisions: uniform, criminal investigations, uniform field support, emergency operations and organizational support.

Sara Cunningham was sworn in as police chief on November 5, 2024.

Services include drug enforcement, criminal investigations, domestic violence, youth liaison, traffic, special weapons And tactics, seniors' liaison, aboriginal liaison, forensics, victims' assistance, crime prevention, community response, K9.

== History ==
Originally formed in 1891, the Sudbury Police became the Sudbury Regional Police on January 1, 1973 and was amalgamated in 2001 as the current Greater Sudbury Police Service.
