= Ramsey Lake =

Lake in Ontario, Canada

- Lac Ramsey (French); Bitimagamasing (Ojibwe)
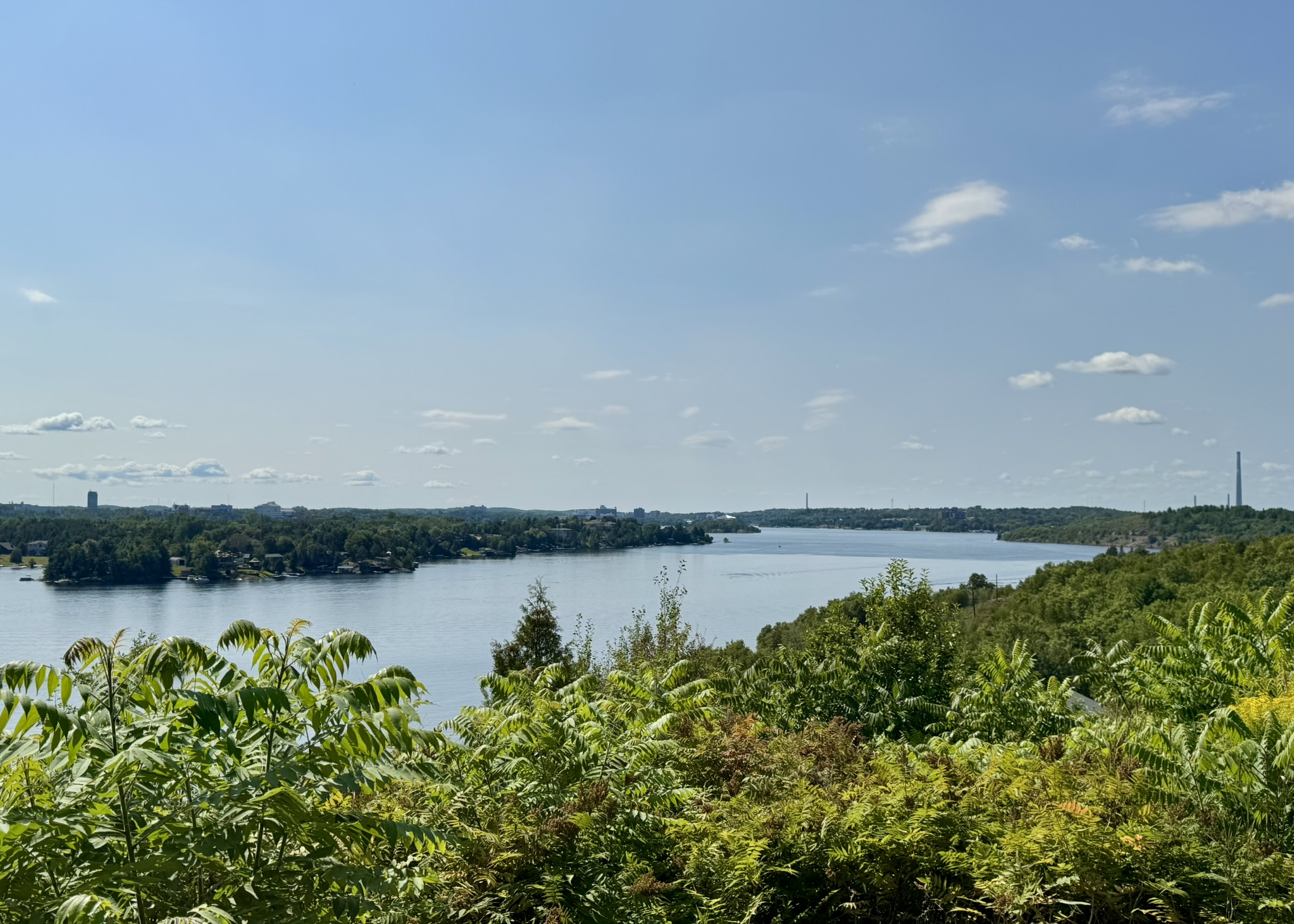
- View of Ramsey Lake from the northern shore.

- Location within City of Greater Sudbury Location within Ontario
- Location: Sudbury, Ontario
- Coordinates: 46°28′N 80°57′W
- Basin countries: Canada
- Surface area: 792.2 ha (1,958 acres)
- Max. depth: 20.5 m (67 ft)
- Shore length^{1}: 34.0 km (21.1 mi)
- Islands: 7
- ^{1} Shore length is not a well-defined measure.

Ramsey Lake (French: Lac Ramsey) is a lake in northern Ontario, Canada, located entirely within the city of Greater Sudbury. The lake, which is traditionally known as Bitimagamasing ("water that lies beside the hill") in Anishinaabemowin, is the 9th largest lake in the city. It was renamed after Canadian Pacific surveyor William Allen Ramsey in 1879, and is a significant source of drinking water for the city. The lake is centrally located in Sudbury, with Bell Park, Laurentian University, and Science North located on its shores.

== Geography ==
Minnow Lake, Laurentian Lake, and several creeks on the north shore drain into Ramsey Lake. Bethel Lake can also flow into Ramsey Lake in times of elevated water levels. Ramsey Lake drains into Lily Creek, which connects to Robinson Lake and Kelly Lake. This further drains into the Spanish River, which ultimately flows into Georgian Bay.

== Ecology ==
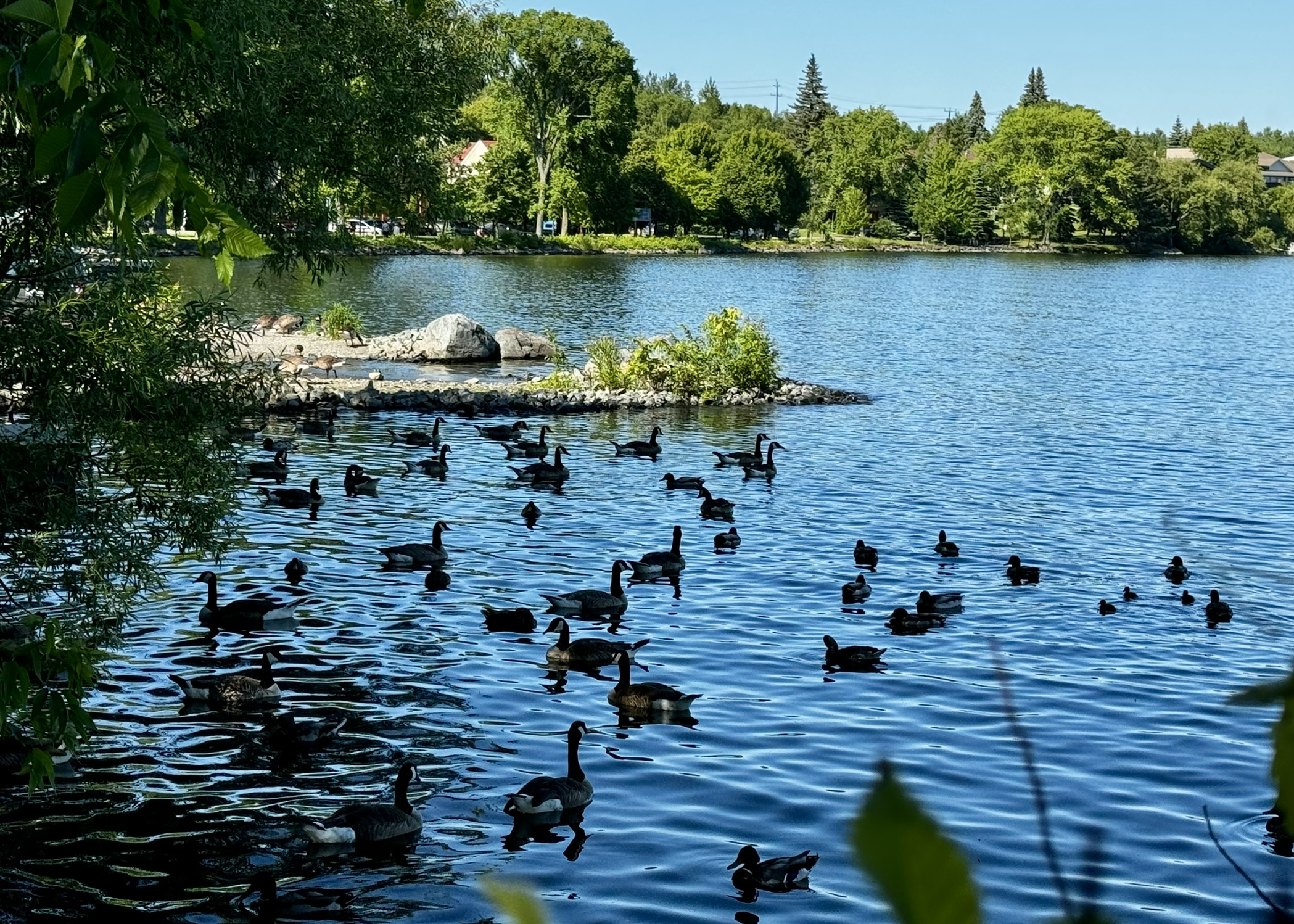
Geese and Ducks on Ramsey Lake

In the 1890s, the smelting of copper and nickel ores began. This heavily impacted the ecology of the Sudbury region, as high concentrations of sulphur dioxide started to acidify soils and lakes. By 1960, the annual sulphur dioxide emissions generated by the mining industry peaked at 2.5 million tonnes.

In 1973, a committee was formed to address the environmental impacts of the mining industry. The committee, later known as the Vegetation Enhancement Technical Advisory Committee (VETAC), began a program to rehabilitate 30,000 hectares of land, including Ramsey Lake. The program received the United Nations Local Government Honours award at the 1992 Earth Summit in Rio de Janeiro, Brazil.

With the closure of the Coniston smelter and the completion of the Inco Superstack in 1973, which dispersed emissions over a wider area, the lake underwent a significant rehabilitation. By 2023, Sudbury had achieved a 98% decline in atmospheric sulphur emissions, and water samples of Ramsey Lake showed a 66.8% decrease in copper and a 39.3% decrease in nickel from 1990 to 2018.

The aquatic biodiversity of the lake has also significantly improved, and it now supports a healthy population of fish, including walleye and northern pike.

Blue-green algae is present in the lake, and it represents a health concern when blooms occur. A noted rise in sodium and chloride levels in the lake, the result of road salt use in winter months, can impact species of zooplankton that consume blue-green algae.

== Human history ==
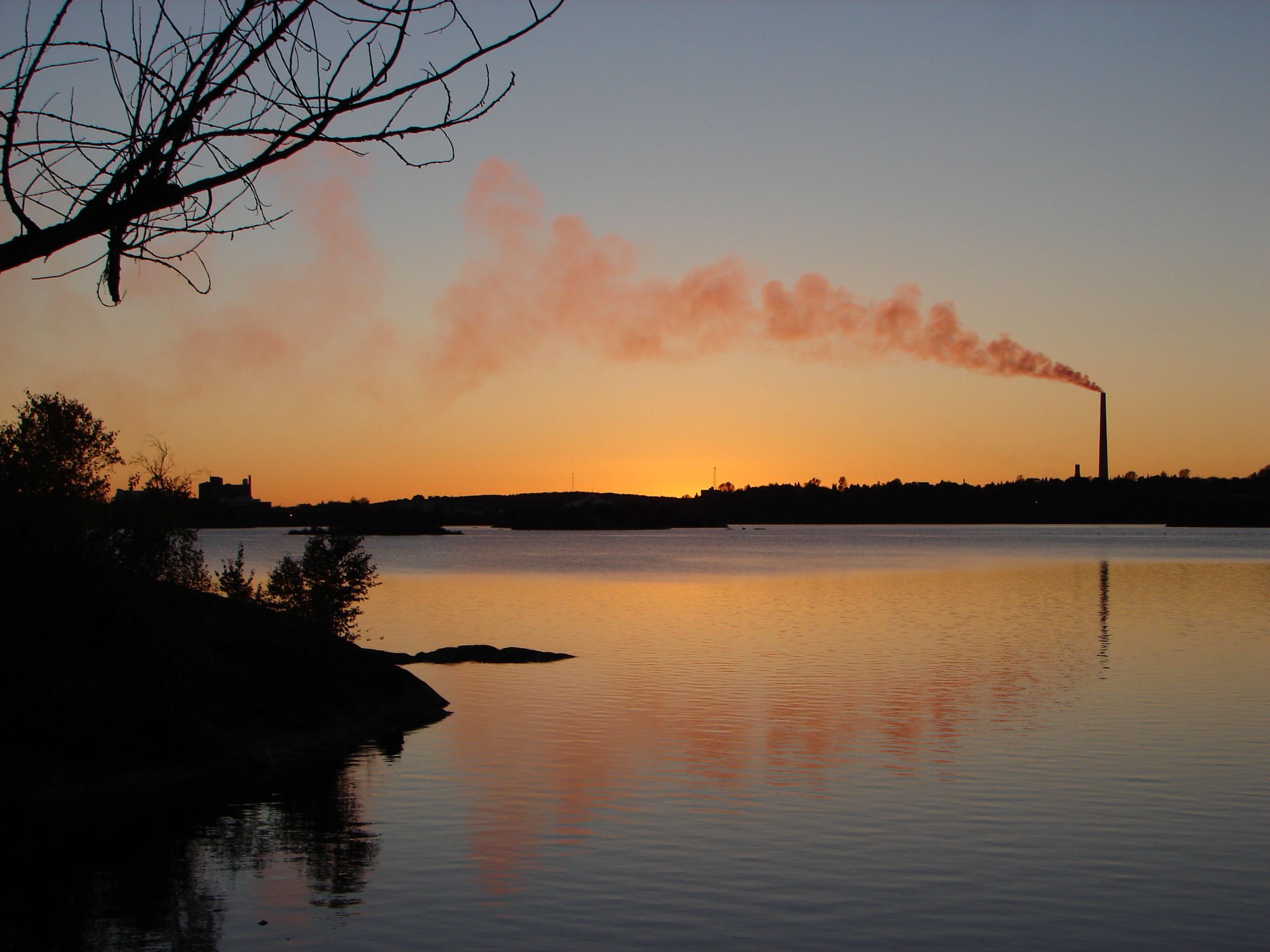
A sunset over Ramsey Lake, with the Inco Superstack in the skyline

The original Anishinaabemowin name for the lake is Bitimagamasing, which is often translated as "water that lies beside the hill". It is located on the traditional lands of the Atikameksheng Anishnawbek within the Robinson Huron treaty of 1850.

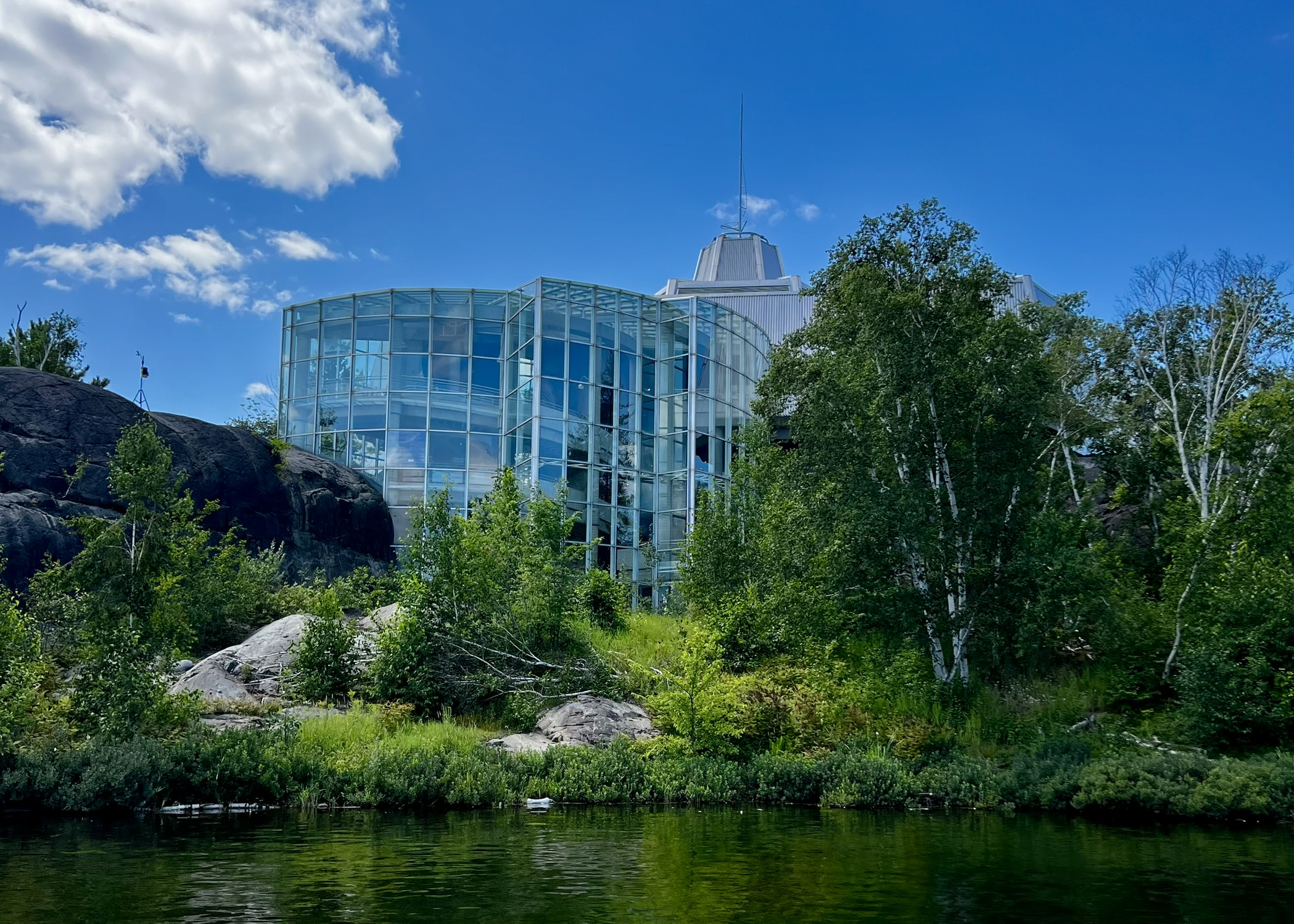
Science North on the shore of Ramsey Lake

In 1871, Canadian Pacific Railway completed a survey of the Sudbury region led by Sandford Fleming, and this survey bypassed the area entirely. Construction had not started by 1879, when a new revision to the survey was ordered. William Allen Ramsey, chief of the survey party, dubbed the lake "Lost Lake" after getting lost in a fog. James Worthington, a superintendent for Canadian Pacific, was impressed by the new survey and renamed the lake in Ramsey's honour.

From 1938 to 1987, Austin Airways operated bush planes from their base on the lake.

Prior to his death in 1945, lumber baron William J. Bell donated a large section of land along the western shore of the lake to the city. The land became Bell Park, which was named in his honour. The park includes a Blue Flag awarded beach, two gazebos, an amphitheatre, and a boardwalk which connects the park to Science North. Moonlight Beach, which sits on the eastern shore of the lake, also holds a Blue Flag award.

In 1984, Science North opened on the southwestern corner of the lake. The building was designed by Moriyama and Teshima, and resembles two snowflakes that are connected by a rock tunnel. It received the Governor General’s Medal for Architecture in 1986.

The William Ramsey Cruise Boat departs from Science North, and runs from June to September.

== See also ==
- Conservation Sudbury
- List of lakes in Ontario
