= Geology of Ontario =

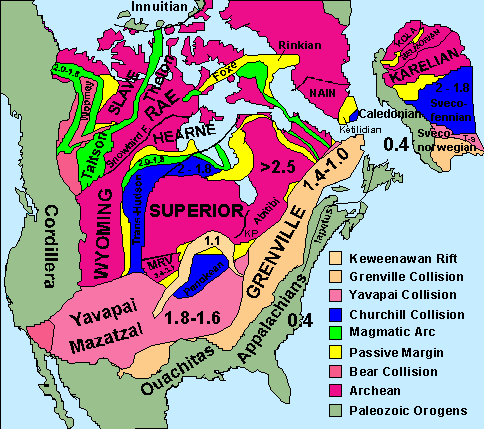
Location of the Grenville and Superior Craton

The geology of Ontario is the study of rock formations in the most populated province in Canada, home to some of the oldest rock on Earth. The geology in Ontario consists of ancient Precambrian igneous and metamorphic rock which sits under younger, sedimentary rocks and soils.

Around 61% of Ontario is covered by the Canadian Shield. The shield, as a whole, can further be divided into three sections- these are known as provinces. The northwestern parts of the Shield, located north and west of Sudbury, are known as the Superior province. This is the largest of the three sections, covering 70% of the Canadian Shield portion in Ontario. The Southern province is a narrow region from Sault Ste. Marie to Kirkland Lake. The South central part is dominated by the Grenville Province but flanked by two basins of Phanerozoic materials.

Abundant mineral deposits are found here and as a result are mined extensively.

== Canadian Shield ==
About 61% of Ontario is covered by the Canadian Shield, mostly with Precambrian rock. The Canadian Shield spans much of northern Ontario and is subdivided into three main geological provinces; The Superior, Southern and Grenville.

=== Superior Province ===
The Superior Craton or Superior Province is an Archean craton. It is a 260 kilometer or 160 mile thick section of stable continental crust formed beginning (4.031 billion years ago-present) which forms the core of the Canadian Shield lying north of Lake Superior for which it is named. It is located roughly north and west of Sudbury

The craton extends from northwestern Quebec along the east side of Hudson Bay south through Northern Ontario to the north shores of Lake Huron and Lake Superior. It extends across Northwestern Ontario south of Hudson Bay and underlies most of southeastern Manitoba. It extends southward through eastern North and South Dakota and western Minnesota.

The Superior province is the largest of the three sections, covering about 70% of the Shield portion in Ontario.

The Superior Province has east–west running bands of volcanic, sedimentary and gneissic rocks. The northernmost parts of the Superior Province is mostly granite and gneiss rocks.

The 2,677 million year old Abitibi greenstone belt in Ontario and Quebec is one of the largest Archean greenstone belts on Earth and one of the youngest parts of the Superior craton which sequentially forms part of the Canadian Shield.

Ontario's metallic mineral wealth such as gold, copper and zinc comes from the Abitibi/Wawa subprovince.

=== Southern Province ===
The Southern province is a narrow region from Sault Ste. Marie to Kirkland Lake, is made of rocks dating 1.8 to 2.4 billion years ago. The Hudson Bay lowlands, located north of the Canadian Shield, are mainly made of sedimentary rocks from the Silurian Period, although some parts date from the Ordovician and Devonian periods. This area covers 25% of the province. Most of the bedrock in the Hudson Bay lowlands is composed of limestone and carbonate-dominated sedimentary rock.

Besides Ontario it also forms parts of the bedrock of Michigan and Minnesota. The Midcontinent Rift System formed 1.1 billion years ago when the Craton split open and formed the basin of Lake Superior. In the Lake Superior region, the up welling of this molten rock may have been the result of a hotspot which produced a triple junction.

=== Grenville Province ===
The Grenville Province makes up about 20 percent of the exposed Canadian Shield in Ontario and located south of Sudbury is 1.0 to 1.6 billion years old and is dominated by sedimentary rocks and later metamorphized. These rocks were metamorphosed between 990 million years ago and 1.08 billion years ago.

Geologists subdivide the Grenville Province into the Allochthon along the river itself and the more northern Parautochthon.

The Allochthon juxtaposed on the Parautochthon during the Grenville orogeny cycle from 1.09 billion to 985 million years ago. The Allochthon is composed of Paleoproterozoic to Mesoproterozoic rocks. In the western part, it is mainly marble, quartzite, and pelite platform levels and Mesoproterozoic amphibolite-grade rocks. There are also charnockite and anorthosite intrusions that intersect metasediments and orthogneiss. In the center, migmatite, quartzo-feldspathic orthogneisses and mangerites predominate. In its eastern part, it consists mainly of gneissic rocks of varied composition and origin, metasedimentary rocks, granitoid intrusions, gabbro, gabbronorite and anorthosite. There are also several anorthositic intrusions scattered throughout the Allochthon belt.

The Parautochthon is a band running parallel to the Grenville Front, which varies in width from Labrador to northeastern Georgian Bay on Lake Huron. Parautochthonous rocks are made up of ancient Archean and Proterozoic rocks that are highly deformed plutonic and metamorphosed supracrustal (metasedimentary and metavolcanic) rocks that reached greenschist to granulite facies on the sequence of metamorphic facies during the Grenville orogeny. These rocks correlate with the least deformed rocks north of the Grenville Front in the Superior Province and show signs of east–west lateral extension.

=== Sudbury basin ===
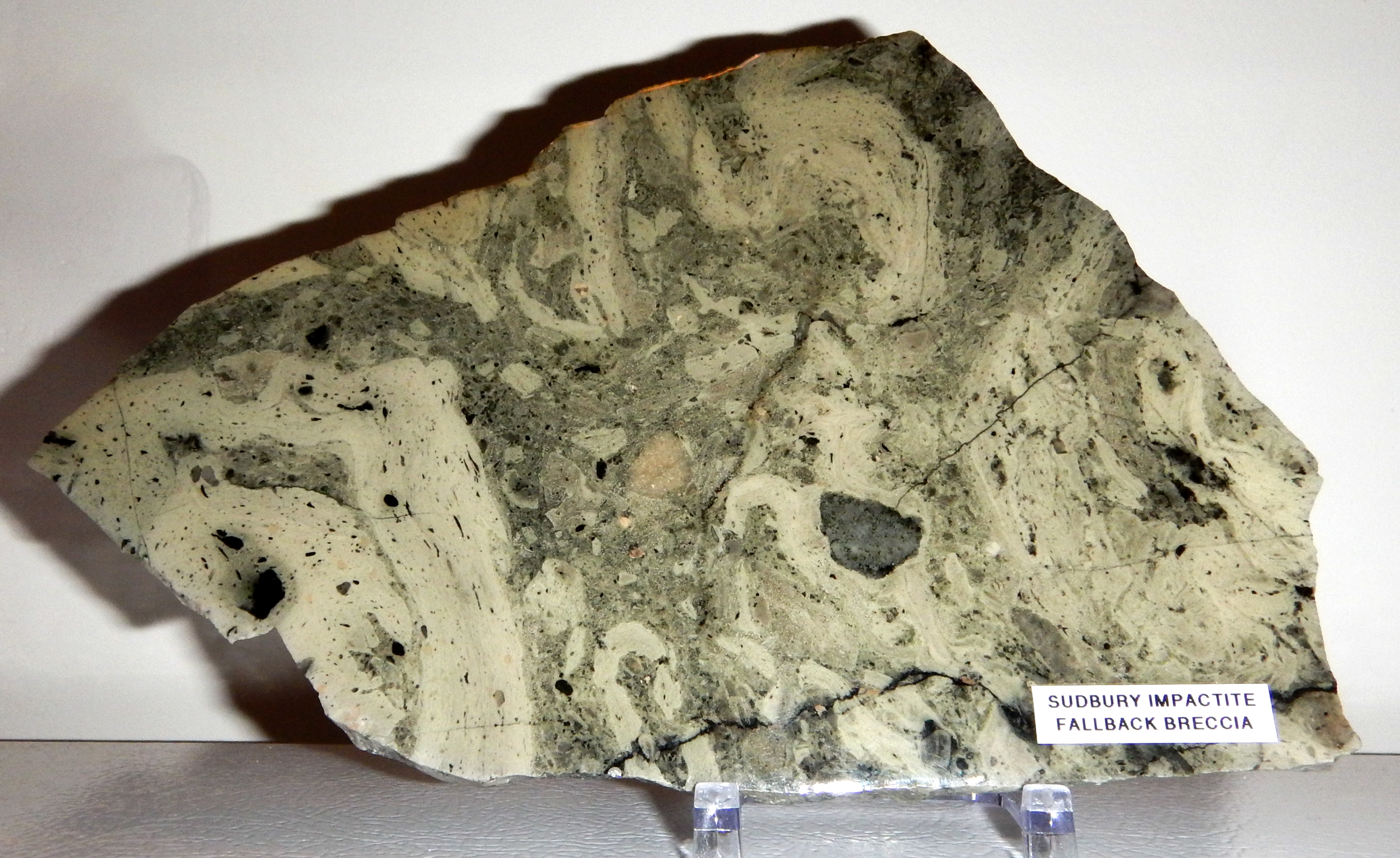
Onaping Fallback Breccia, polished slab, 15 by 23 cm (6 by 9 in)

The Sudbury Basin formed as a result of an impact into the Nuna supercontinent from a bolide approximately 10–15 km (6.2–9.3 mi) in diameter that occurred 1,849 million years ago

Sudbury Basin is the third-largest crater on Earth, after the 300 km (190 mi) Vredefort impact structure in South Africa, and the 150 km (93 mi) Chicxulub crater under Yucatán, Mexico.

The Sudbury Igneous Complex is an impact melt that formed from this impact and the high pressures and temperatures melted the surrounding rock.

NASA used the site to geologically train the Apollo astronauts in recognizing rocks formed as the result of a very large impact, such as breccias. Astronauts who would use this training on the Moon included Apollo 15's David Scott and James Irwin, Apollo 16's John Young and Charlie Duke, and Apollo 17's Gene Cernan and Jack Schmitt. Notable geologist instructors included William R. Muehlberger.

=== Dike swarms ===
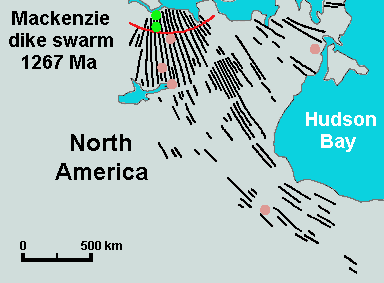
Map of the Mackenzie dike swarm

Ontario has many of the world's largest dike swarms. A dike swarm is a large geological structure consisting of a major group of parallel, linear, or radially oriented dikes intruded within continental crust. They consist of several to hundreds of dikes emplaced more or less at the same time during a single intrusive event. Dike swarms often show mantle plume activity.

Dike swarms may extend over 400 km (250 mi) in width and length. The largest dike swarm known on Earth is the Mackenzie dike swarm in Ontario which is 500 km (310 mi) wide and 3,000 km (1,900 mi) long.

The dike swarms in Ontario are,

- Grenville dike swarm
- Mackenzie dike swarm
- Marathon dike swarm (northwestern Ontario)
- Matachewan dike swarm (eastern Ontario)
- Mistassini dike swarm (western Quebec)
- Sudbury dike swarm (northeastern Ontario)

== Phanerozoic ==
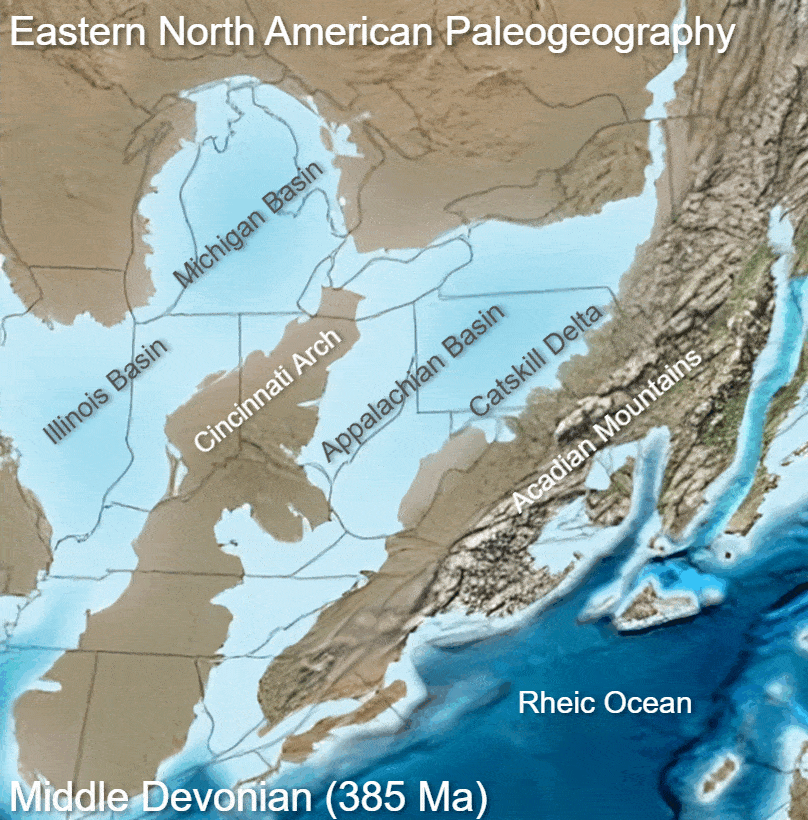
Middle Devonian

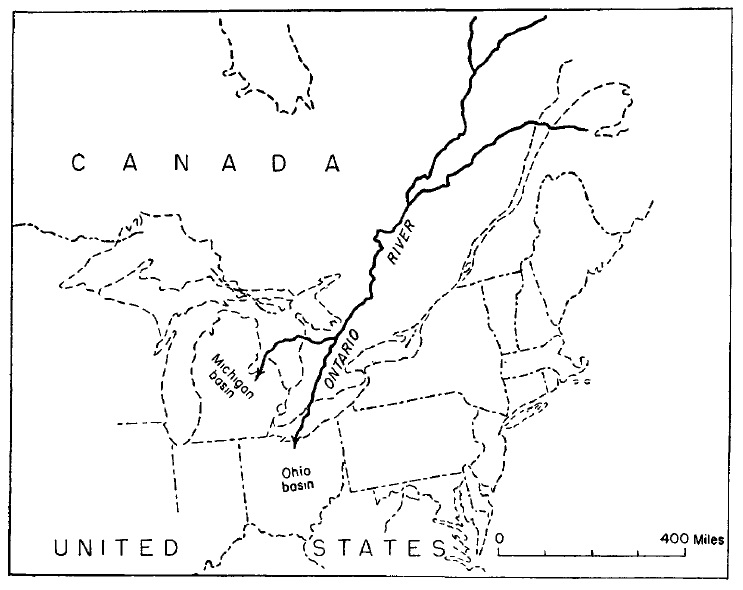
Ontario Paleoriver in the Devonian.

Ordovician, Silurian and Devonian rocks and fossils can be found in the basins in the south and north of the province.

== Hudson Bay Lowlands ==
The Hudson Bay Lowlands

The Hudson Bay Lowlands are a vast wetland located between the Canadian Shield and southern shores of Hudson Bay and James Bay. They contain an area called the Ring of Fire (Northern Ontario) which is a massive planned chromite mining and smelting development project.

By the fall of 2011, the Ring of Fire was considered "one of the largest potential mineral reserves in Ontario" with "more than 35 junior and intermediate mining and exploration companies covering an area of about "1.5 million hectares".

== Saint Lawrence Lowlands ==
The Saint Lawrence Lowlands are a basin stretching from Windsor to Quebec City with very rich soil.

== Wisconsin glaciation ==
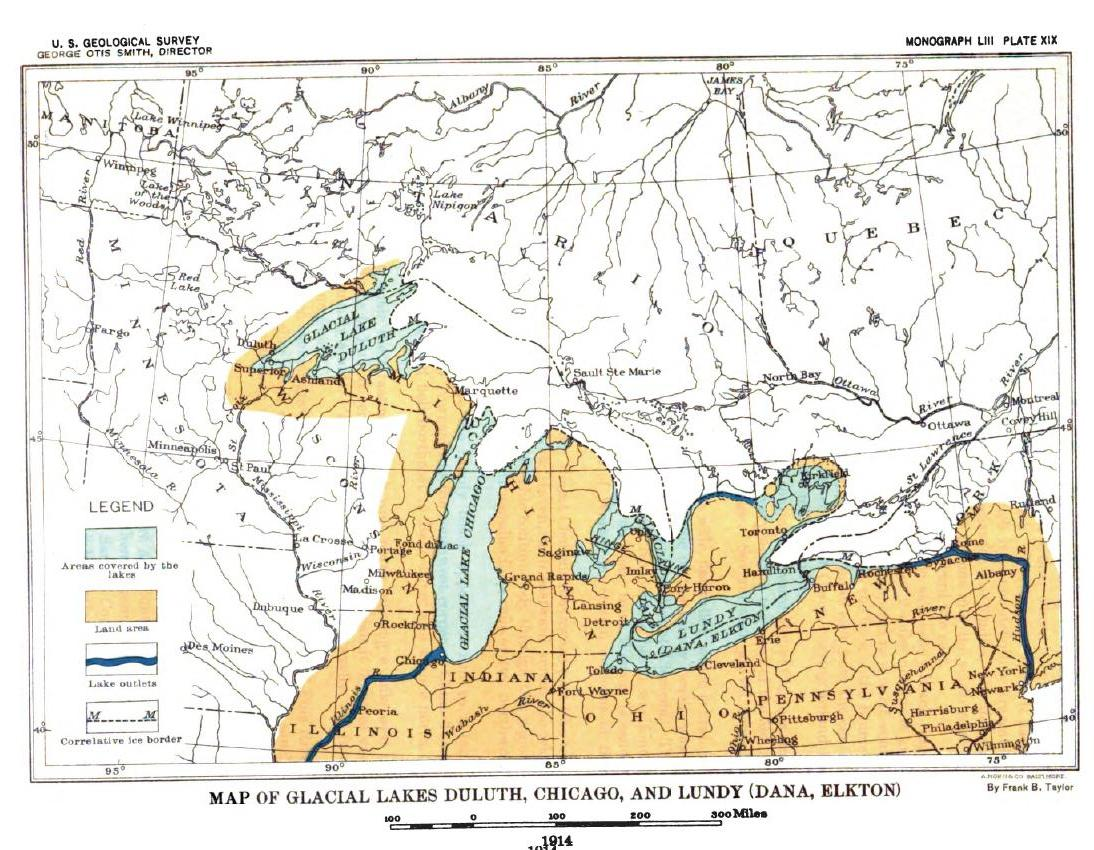
Glacial Lakes

The Wisconsin glaciation extended from approximately 75,000 to 11,000 years ago. The maximum ice extent occurred approximately 25,000–21,000 years ago during the Last Glacial Maximum.

=== Niagara Falls ===
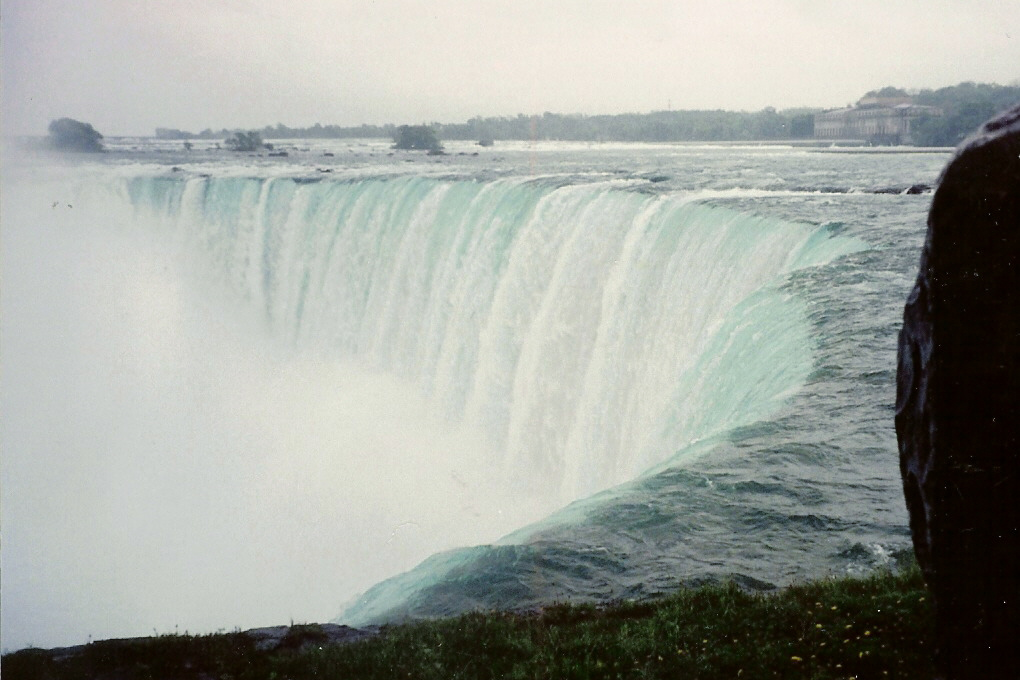
Horseshoe Falls, the largest waterfall at Niagara Falls

The features that became Niagara Falls were created by the Wisconsin glaciation about 10,000 years ago. The same forces also created the North American Great Lakes and the Niagara River. All were dug by a continental ice sheet that drove through the area, deepening some river channels to form lakes, and damming others with debris.

When the ice melted, the upper Great Lakes emptied into the Niagara River, which followed the rearranged topography across the Niagara Escarpment. In time, the river cut a gorge through the north-facing cliff, or cuesta. Because of the interactions of three major rock formations, the rocky bed did not erode evenly. The top rock formation was composed of erosion-resistant limestone and dolomite of the Lockport Formation. That hard layer of stone eroded more slowly than the underlying materials.

Immediately below the hard-rock formation, comprising about two-thirds of the cliff, lay the weaker, softer, sloping Rochester Formation (Lower Silurian). This formation was composed mainly of shale, though it has some thin limestone layers. It also contains ancient fossils. In time, the river eroded the soft layer that supported the hard layers, undercutting the hard caprock, which gave way in great chunks. This process repeated countless times, eventually carving out the falls.

Submerged in the river in the lower valley, hidden from view, is the Queenston Formation (Upper Ordovician), which is composed of shales and fine sandstones. All three formations were laid down in an ancient sea, their differences of character deriving from changing conditions within that sea.

About 10,900 years ago, the Niagara Falls was between present-day Queenston, Ontario, and Lewiston, New York, but erosion of their crest has caused the waterfalls to retreat approximately 6.8 miles (10.9 km) southward. The Horseshoe Falls, which are about 2,600 feet (790 m) wide, have also changed their shape through the process of erosion; evolving from a small arch to a horseshoe bend, to the present day gigantic V. Just upstream from the falls' current location, Goat Island splits the course of the Niagara River, resulting in the separation of the mostly Canadian Horseshoe Falls to the west from the American and Bridal Veil Falls to the east. Engineering has slowed erosion and recession.

The current rate of erosion is approximately 30 centimeters (1 ft) per year, down from a historical average of 0.91 m (3 ft) per year. According to the timeline of the far future, in roughly 50,000 years Niagara Falls will have eroded the remaining 32 kilometres (20 mi) to Lake Erie and ceased to exist.

== Mining ==
Hard-rock mining has taken place in the province for over 130 years (as of 2012). The mining industry in Ontario produces more than 30 different metal and non-metal mineral products, and is responsible for a major percentage of Canada's nickel, gold, copper and platinum-group metals production. The extraction of metallic minerals is concentrated in Northern Ontario, while the southern portion of the province produces salt, gypsum, lime, nepheline syenite and structural materials (sand, gravel, stone), along with some petroleum. As of 2014, the mining industry produced about $11 billion worth of minerals. Derisory fees are charged by the government for prospecting licences ($25.50) and exploration permits (nil), in keeping with the duty of economic development of the province. The exploration permit process is meant as a means to notify interested parties, such as surface landowners, of the activities of miners. The development of a mine proceeds through "advanced exploration" to "production" status, the legislation for which is detailed in the Mining Act of Ontario; this covers hard-rock, aggregate, diamond and petroleum mines.
