= Sudbury Basin =

Impact structure in Ontario, Canada

- Sudbury Structure
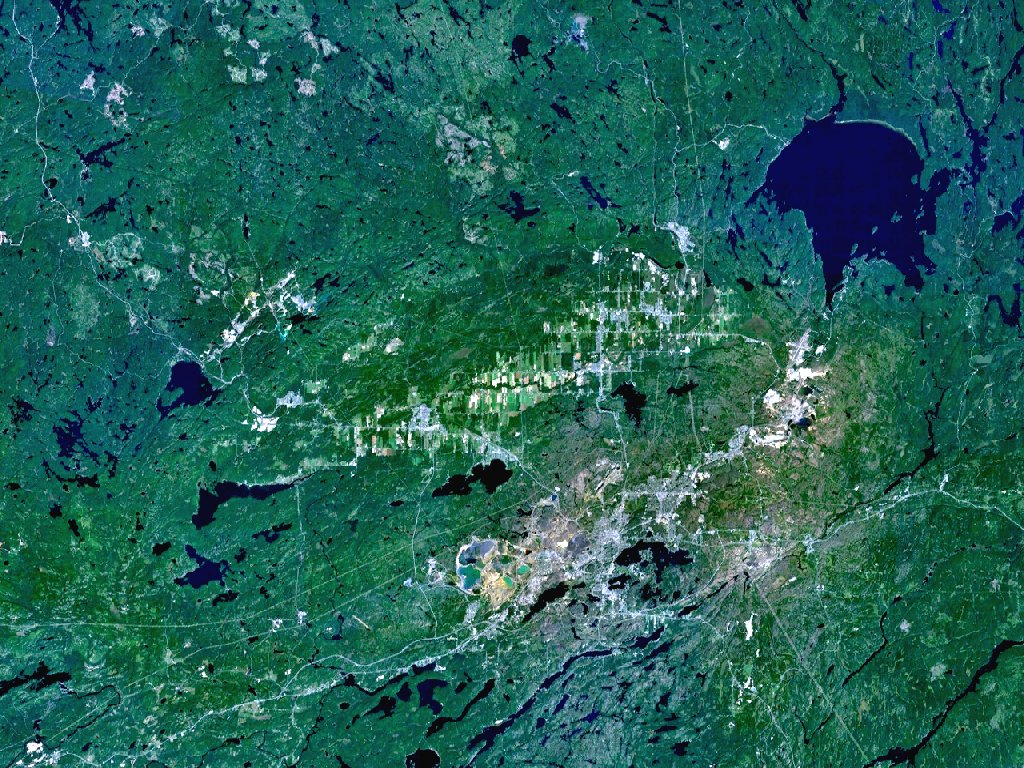
- NASA World Wind satellite image of the Sudbury astrobleme

- Location within Canada
- Location: Ontario, Canada; 46°36′N 81°11′W

Impact crater structure
- Confidence: Confirmed
- Diameter: 130 km (81 mi)
- Age: 1849 Ma; Paleoproterozoic
- Exposed: Yes
- Drilled: Yes
- Bolide type: Chondrite

Geological map of Sudbury Basin from Litza et al. (2026)

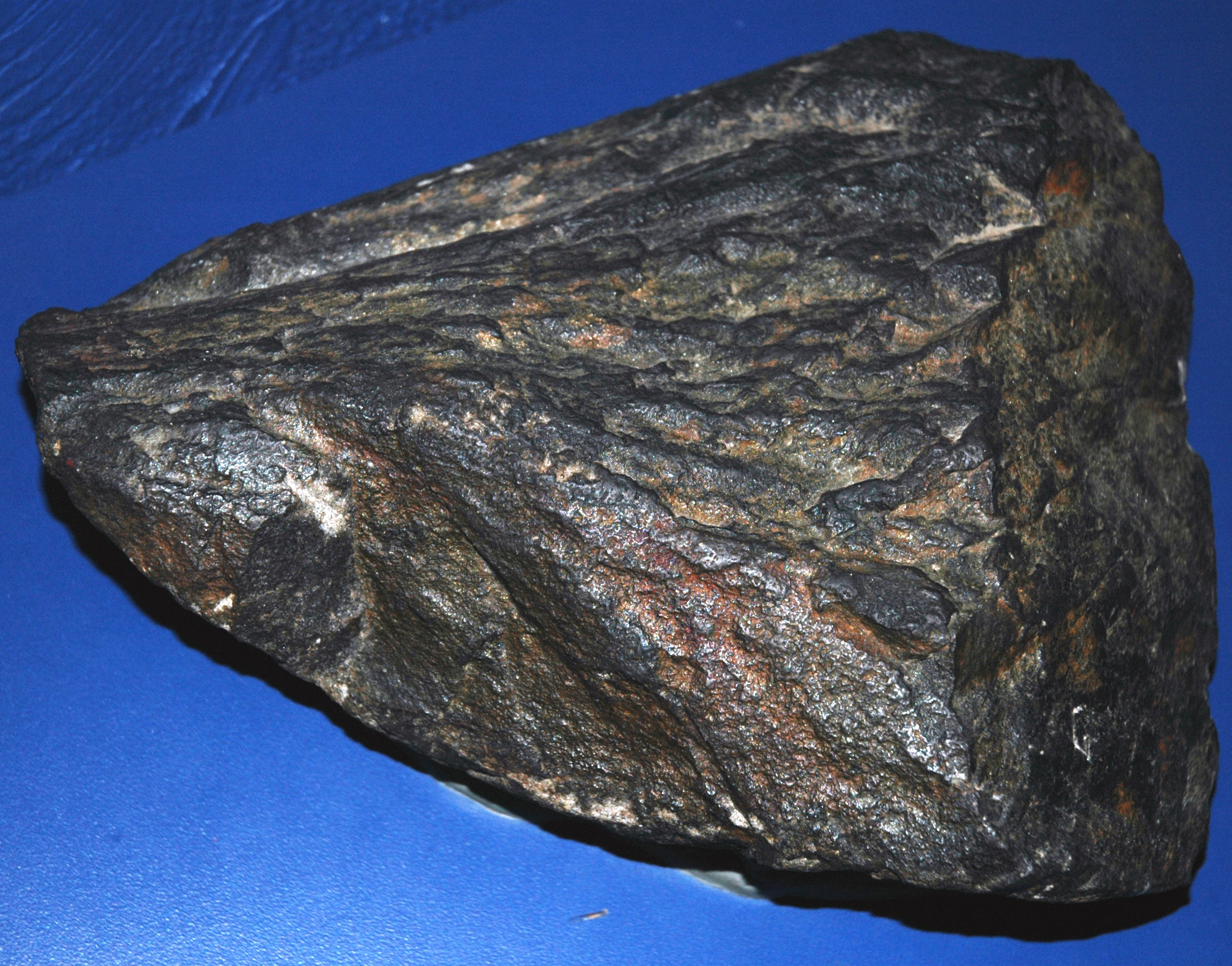
Shatter cone from Sudbury Impact Structure, Cleveland Museum of Natural History

The Sudbury Basin (/ˈsʌdbəri/), also known as Sudbury Structure or the Sudbury Nickel Irruptive, is a major geological structure in Ontario, Canada. It is among the oldest and largest known impact structures on Earth. The structure, the eroded remnant of an impact crater, was formed by the impact of an asteroid 1.849 billion years ago in the Paleoproterozoic era. The ores of the Sudbury Basin are known to contain nickel, copper, gold, silver, platinum, palladium, rhodium, iridium, and ruthenium.

The Basin is located on the Canadian Shield in the city of Greater Sudbury, Ontario. The former municipalities of Rayside-Balfour, Valley East and Capreol lie within the Sudbury Basin, which is referred to locally as "The Valley". The urban core of the former city of Sudbury lies on the southern outskirts of the Basin.

An Ontario Historical Plaque was erected by the province to commemorate the discovery of the Sudbury Basin.

== Formation ==
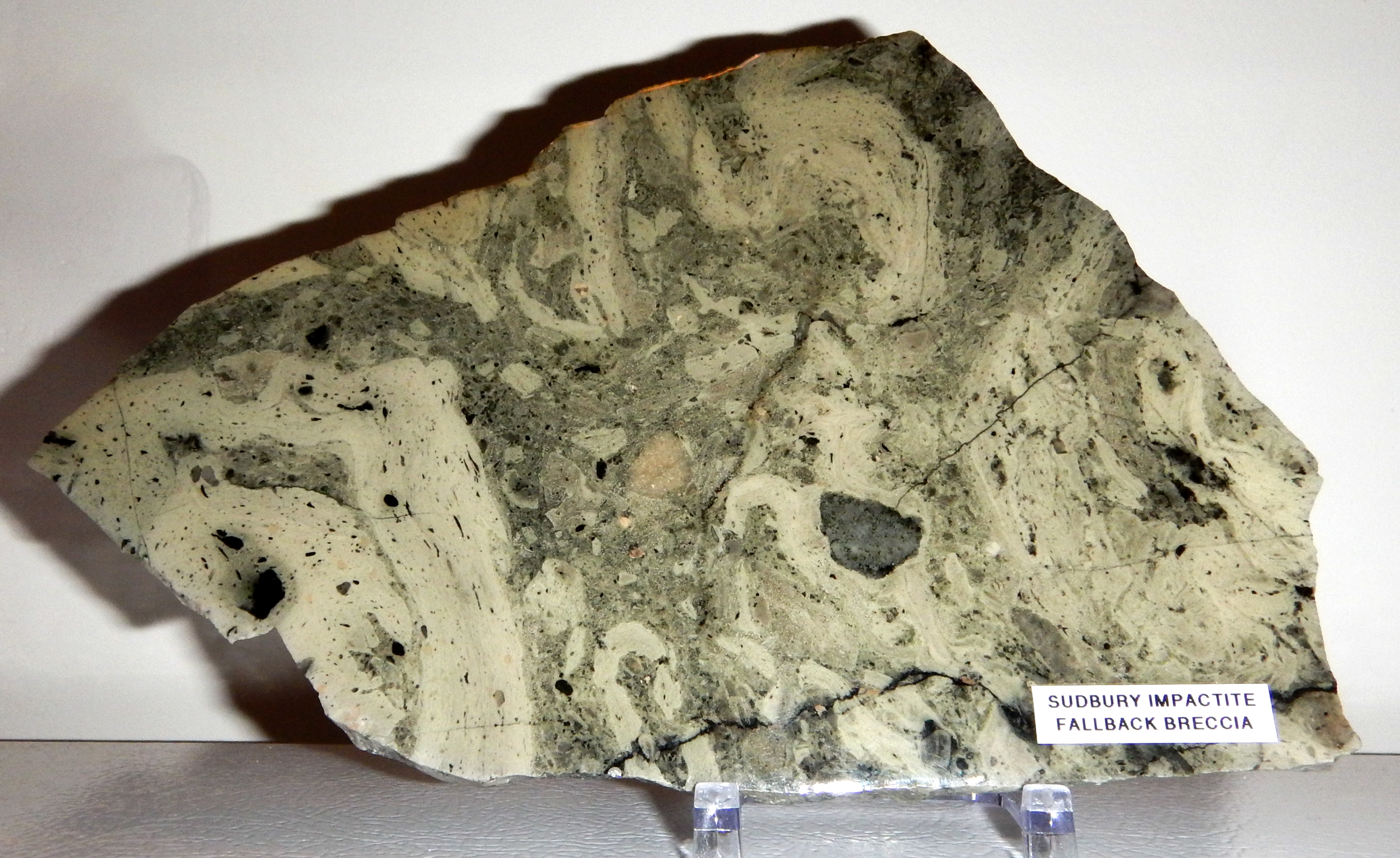
Onaping Fallback Breccia, polished slab, 15 by 23 cm (6 by 9 in)

The Sudbury Basin formed as a result of an impact of a large impact body approximately 10–15 km (6.2–9.3 mi) in diameter that occurred 1.849 billion years ago in the Paleoproterozoic era. Proposed released energies for the impact are 8.6×10^{23} Joules and 2.31×10^{24} J.

Debris from the impact was scattered over an area of 1,600,000 km^{2} (620,000 sq mi) and thrown more than 800 km (500 mi); ejecta—rock fragments ejected by the impact—have been found as far away as Minnesota.

Models suggest that for such a large impact, debris was most likely scattered globally, but has since been eroded. Its present size is believed to be a smaller portion of a 130-kilometre (81 mi) diameter crater that the meteor originally created. Subsequent geological processes have deformed the crater into the current smaller oval shape. Sudbury Basin is among the largest-known craters on Earth, after the 300-kilometre (190 mi) diameter Vredefort impact structure in South Africa, and the 180-kilometre (110 mi) diameter Chicxulub crater under Yucatán, Mexico.

Geochemical evidence suggests that the impactor was likely a chondrite asteroid or a comet with a chondritic component.

== Structure ==
The full extent of the Sudbury Basin is 62 km (39 mi) long, 30 km (19 mi) wide, and 15 km (9.3 mi) deep, although the modern ground surface is much shallower.

The main units characterizing the Sudbury Basin are as follows (in stratigraphic order): The footwall brecciated country rock including the offset dikes, The Sublayer, The Sudbury Igneous Complex (SIC), and the Whitewater Group.

Footwall rocks, associated with the impact event, consist of Sudbury Breccia (pseudotachylite), footwall breccia, radial and concentric quartz dioritic breccia dikes (polymict impact melt breccias).

The sub layer is the main zone of mineralization.

The SIC is an elliptical shaped differentiated igneous body. Geographically it is common to differentiate the different areas of the SIC by the North Range, the East Range and the South Range which refer to the high topographic areas around the rim of the impact site. Stratigraphically the base of the SIC starts with quartz Norite capped by brown or green norite in the south range, and mafic norite capped by felsic norite in the north and east ranges. Overlying these norite layers is quartz gabbro followed by the Crows Foot granophyre and a transition layer of normal granophyre.

The Whitewater Group consists of a suevite and sedimentary package composed of the Onaping (fallback breccias), Onwatin, and Chelmsford Formations in stratigraphic succession.

Because considerable erosion has occurred since the Sudbury event, an estimated 6 km (3.7 mi) in the North Range, it is difficult to directly constrain the actual size of the diameter of the original transient cavity, or the final rim diameter.

The deformation of the Sudbury structure occurred in five main deformation events (by age in millions of years):

1. the formation of the Sudbury Igneous Complex (1849 Ma),
2. the Penokean orogeny (1890–1830 Ma),
3. the Mazatzal orogeny (1700–1600 Ma),
4. the Grenville orogeny (1400–1000 Ma), and
5. the Lake Wanapitei impact (37 Ma).

== Origin ==
Geological map of the Copper Cliff area, produced in the 1950s

Some 1.8 billion years of weathering and deformation made it difficult to prove that a meteorite was the cause of the Sudbury geological structures. A further difficulty in proving that the Sudbury complex was formed by meteorite impact rather than by ordinary igneous processes was that the region was volcanically active at around the same time as the impact, and some weathered volcanic structures can look like meteorite collision structures. Since its discovery, a layer of breccia has been found associated with the impact event, and stressed rock formations have been fully mapped.

Reports published in the late 1960s described geological features that were said to be distinctive of meteorite impacts, including shatter cones and shock-deformed quartz crystals in the underlying rock. Geologists reached a consensus by about 1970 that the Sudbury Basin was formed by a meteorite impact. In 2014, analysis of the concentration and distribution of siderophile elements as well as the size of the area where the impact melted the rock indicated that a comet, rather than an asteroid, most likely caused the crater.

The Sudbury Basin is located near a number of other geological structures, including the Temagami Magnetic Anomaly, the Lake Wanapitei impact crater, the western end of the Ottawa-Bonnechere Graben, the Grenville Front Tectonic Zone, and the eastern end of the Great Lakes Tectonic Zone, but the structures are not directly related to one another in the sense of resulting from the same geological processes.

== Mining ==
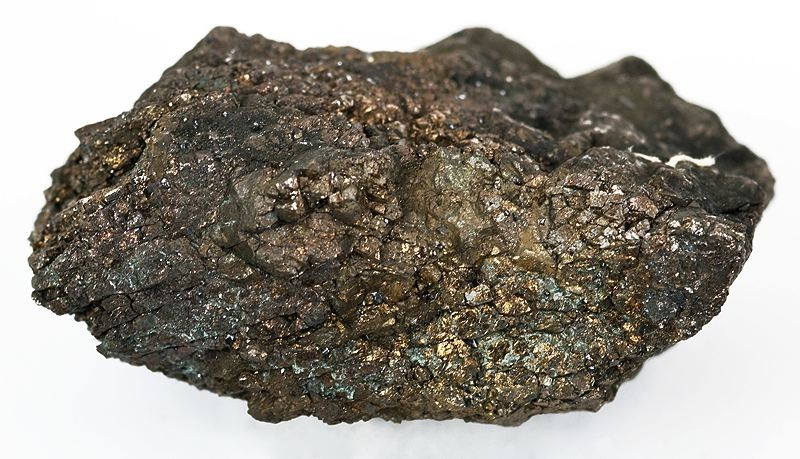
Rich ore sample from Sudbury, collected in 1932: Pentlandite – Chalcopyrite – Pyrrhotite

The large impact crater filled with magma containing nickel, copper, palladium, gold, the platinum group, and other metals. This magma formed into pyrrhotite, chalcopyrite, and pentlandite rocks, as well as cubanite and magnetite.

In 1856, while surveying a baseline westward from Lake Nipissing, provincial land surveyor Albert Salter located magnetic abnormalities in the area that were strongly suggestive of mineral deposits, especially near what later became the Creighton Mine. The area was examined by Alexander Murray of the Geological Survey of Canada, who confirmed "the presence of an immense mass of magnetic trap".

Due to the then-remoteness of the Sudbury area, Salter's discovery did not have much immediate effect. The construction of the Canadian Pacific Railway through the area, however, made mineral exploration more feasible. The development of a mining settlement occurred in 1883 after blasting at the railway construction site revealed a large concentration of nickel and copper ore at what is now the Murray Mine site, named by owners William and Thomas Murray.

The Vermillion Mine, which was the first in the Basin to be exploited, was the site at which Frank Sperry (a chemist of the Canadian Copper Company) made the first identification in 1889 of the arsenide of platinum which bears his name.

As a result of the 1917 Royal Ontario Nickel Commission, which was chaired by Englishman George Thomas Holloway, the legislative structure of the prospecting trade was significantly altered. Some of the Holloway recommendations were in line with the advocacy of Aeneas McCharles, a 19th-century prospector and early mine owner.

As a result of these metal deposits, the Sudbury area is one of the world's major mining communities, and has fathered Vale Inco and Falconbridge (now a division of Xstrata). The Basin is one of the world's largest suppliers of nickel and copper ores. Most of these mineral deposits are found on its outer rim.

=== List of mines in the Sudbury Basin ===
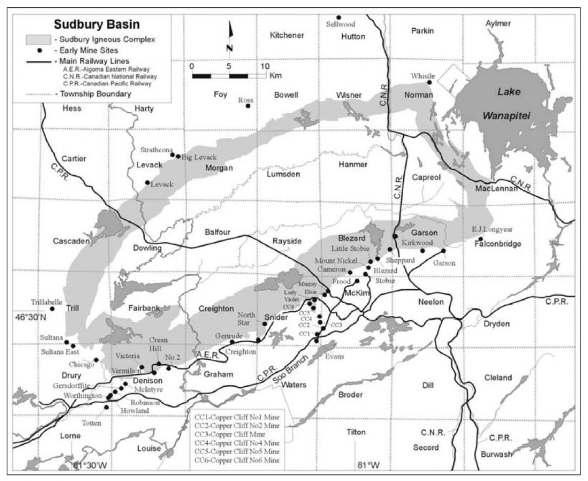
Topographic map of the geology and geographic features of Ontario's Sudbury Basin includes mine sites up to year of publication (1917)

This list was collected from the 1917 topographic map of the Sudbury Basin, located at right.

- Levack Mine
- Coleman Mine
- Strathcona Mine
- Big Levack Mine
- Ross Mine
- Whistle Mine
- Falconbridge Mine
- Garson Mine
- Kirkwood Mine
- Sheppard Mine
- Blezard Mine
- Little Stobie Mine
- Mount Nickel Mine
- Stobie Mine
- Frood Mine
- Cameron Mine
- Murray Mine
- Elgin Mine
- Lady Violet Mine
- Copper Cliff North Mine
- Copper Cliff South Mine
- North Star Mine
- Creighton Mine
- Gertrude Mine
- No. 2 Mine
- Crean Hill Mine
- Vermillion Mine
- Victoria Mine
- McIntyre Mine
- Robinson Mine
- Worthington Mine
- Howland Mine
- Totten Mine
- Chicago Mine
- Sultana East Mine
- Sultana Mine
- Trillabelle Mine
- Evans Mine
- Elsie Mine
- Sheppard deposit

== Economic geology ==
The mineral deposits around Sudbury are linked to the impact event, which created conditions for a magmatic style ore deposit. The events are proposed to be the following:

1. The meteor impact hits Sudbury melting a large amount of crust
2. The magma differentiates into a silicate melt and an immiscible sulphide melt (like oil and water)
3. As time goes on, as immiscible sulphide melt and silicate melt move around together elements like Cu, Ni and elements of the platinum group partition into the sulphide melt due to their siderophile chalcophile properties
4. Due to its higher density compared to the silicate melt, over time the sulphide melt sinks the bottom of the impact crater and starts to solidify
5. As the sulphide melt cools at the bottom of the crater the following minerals solidify out (shallow to deep order / more compatible / less compatible): pyrrhotite, pentlandite, chalcopyrite, platinum group elements, bornite, millerite

Mineral deposits in Sudbury are generally grouped into four types.

- Contact deposits forming on the margin between the Sudbury Igneous Complex and the lower footwall breccia (e.g. Creighton Mine)
- Footwall deposits forming below the contact deposits in the country rock (e.g. Coleman Mine)
- Offset deposits (e.g. Copper Cliff North Mine)
- Sudbury breccia and recrystalized country rock (e.g. Stobie Mine)

== Soils ==
Most soils in the Sudbury Basin are acidic and sandy; where well-drained, they usually belong to the Podzol great soil group. Poor drainage results in gleysols and peats. Regardless of drainage or classification, the Basin has deeper soils than the surrounding terrain, much of which is mapped as Rockland (a combination of frequent bedrock outcrops and shallow soil). Consequently, considerable areas in the Basin have been cleared for agriculture. The best soils, mapped as Azilda series and Bradley series, occur around Chelmsford.

== Astronaut training ==
NASA used the site to train the Apollo astronauts in recognizing rocks formed as the result of a very large impact, such as breccias. Those who used this training on the Moon include Apollo 15's David Scott and James Irwin, Apollo 16's John Young and Charlie Duke, and Apollo 17's Gene Cernan and Jack Schmitt. Notable geologist instructors included William R. Muehlberger.

== See also ==
- Economic geology
- Geology of Ontario
- List of impact craters on Earth
- List of possible impact structures on Earth
