= N'Swakamok Native Friendship Centre =

N'Swakamok Indigenous Friendship Centre
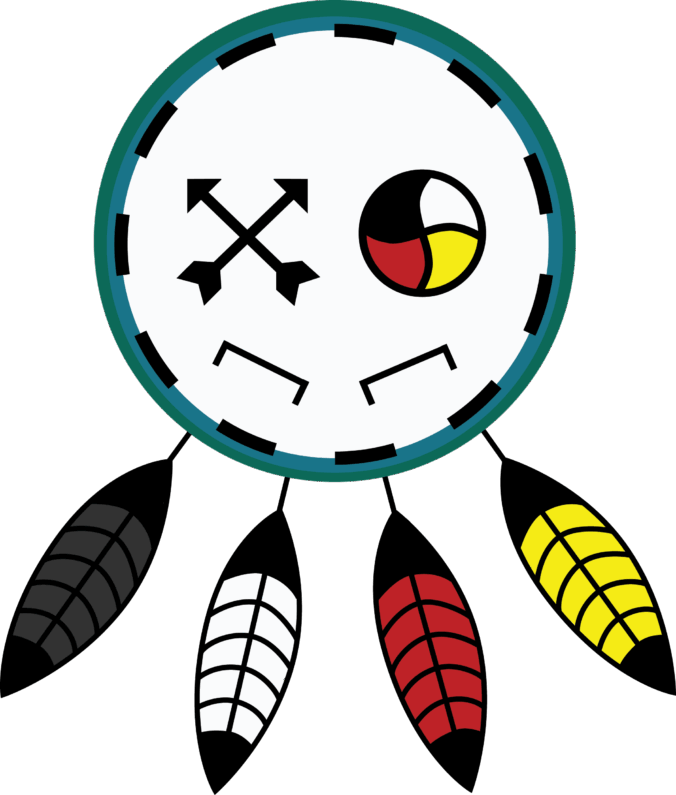
- Formation: 1967
- Type: Native Friendship Centre
- Headquarters: 110 Elm Street; Sudbury, Ontario; P3C 1T5
- Website: https://www.nfcsudbury.org/

The N'Swakamok Native Friendship Centre is a Native Friendship Centre assisting Indigenous peoples of Canada migrating to or already living in Greater Sudbury, Ontario. The Friendship Centre has developed and implemented programs and activities that serve the social, cultural, and recreational needs of the urban Native community in Sudbury.

== Name and region ==
N'Swakamok translates to 'where the three roads meet' in the Ojibwe language and is the original name for the area including present-day Sudbury. The Whitefish Lake Reserve was located just southwest of Sudbury, and Wahnapitae First Nation is located west across Lake Wanapitei.

== History ==
In 1969, a white paper calling attention to local Indigenous issues was circulated. Journalist Lisa Shawongonabe wrote that white paper was likely composed by the founders of the N'Swakamok Native Friendship Centre, which was first established in 1967, through the efforts of the Nickel Belt Indian Club. The directors and some of the members were actively involved in doing work such as courtwork and referral work for the Indigenous community of Sudbury.

In 1972, the Friendship Center was officially incorporated under the name of the Indian-Eskimo Friendship Centre. The steering committee, which consisted of 11 people, then hired for four positions: director, secretary, program director, and trainee to work with a local courtworker. The original location of the Friendship Centre was on Ignatius Street. The then moved Douglas Street, which provided more office space, and on to Larch Street.

The Centre is now located at 110 Elm Street, in Downtown Sudbury, and has purchased its building in 1982. It formally changed its name to N'Swakamok Native Friendship Centre in 1983.

== Aims and objectives ==
- To provide a medium for the meeting of Native and non-Native people and the development of mutual understanding through common activities.
- To stimulate and assist Native self-expression and the development of Native leadership by providing assistance in the implementation of programmes and services which provide opportunities for Native people to improve their social and economic status.
- To assist and encourage the study of Native needs and the planning of services with Native people in both public and private agencies.

The Friendship Centre is governed by a Board of Directors, who are elected at annual meetings of public attendance. Membership fees are $1.00 for students, $2.00 for adults, and $3.00 for families. The Friendship Centre also works cooperatively with both public and private agencies of drug and alcohol abuse and legal and social services. It is able to develop its programs in a way that reflects its community and their communication practices and styles. The N'Swakamok Native Friendship Centre has grown in knowledge, skills, communication, space and staff. Presently it houses 14 different supportive programs, hosts many activities and provides employment for 28 staff. Programs offered by the Friendship Centre include an Aboriginal Courtwork Program, a Literacy Program, an Employment Program, an Aboriginal Family Support Program, and a Community Support Program.

== Activities ==
Over the past 10 years, the Friendship Centre has developed and implemented a philosophy of community development as a part of program delivery. The Land Base Committee of the Friendship Centre began fundraising and planning in 1983. By 1986, the Committee purchased 64 acres (260,000 m^{2}) of land on the outskirts of Sudbury, which helped to provide both cultural growth and awareness.

The N'swakamok Native Friendship Centre hosts an annual powwow celebrating National Indigenous Peoples Day at Bell Park, with hundreds of participants. They have also hosted memorials and celebrations of life.

Every year, the centre hosts an Every Child Matters Walk on September 30, the annual National Day for Truth and Reconciliation.

== See also ==
- Native Friendship Centre of Montreal
