= Creighton Mine =

Underground mine in Ontario, Canada

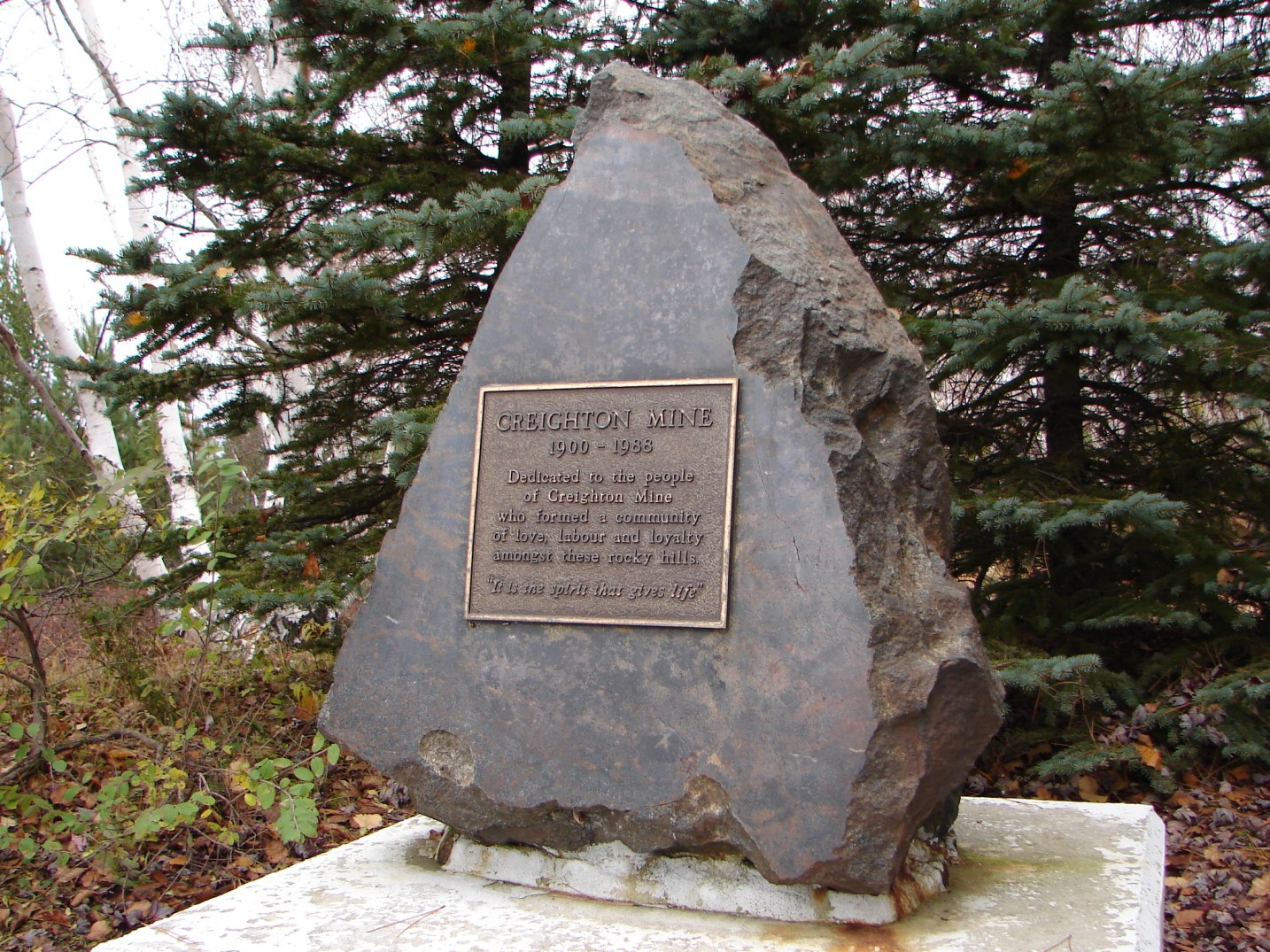

- Location of the mine within Ontario Creighton Mine (Ontario) Creighton Mine (Canada)
- Interactive map of Creighton Mine
- Location: Greater Sudbury, Ontario, Canada; 46°27′50″N 81°10′29″W
- Products: Nickel, Copper, Platinum, Palladium, Gold, Silver
- Type: Underground, originally open pit
- Opened: 1901
- Company: Vale Limited
- Website: vale.com

Creighton Mine is an underground nickel, copper, and platinum-group elements (PGE) mine. It is presently owned and operated by Vale Limited (formerly known as INCO) in the city of Greater Sudbury, Ontario, Canada. Open pit mining began in 1901, and underground mining began in 1906. The mine is situated in the Sudbury Igneous Complex (SIC) in its South Range geologic unit. The mine is the source of many excavation-related seismic events, such as earthquakes and rock burst events. It is home to SNOLAB, and is currently the deepest nickel mine in Canada. Expansion projects to deepen the Creighton Mine are currently underway.

== History ==
=== Discovery and development ===
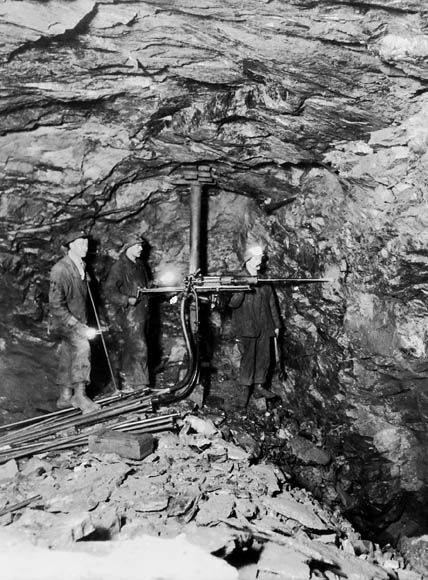
Miners drilling in the Creighton Mine, unknown date

The deposits at Creighton mine were the first mineralized deposits discovered in the Sudbury Igneous Complex (SIC) mining camp. They were discovered by Albert Salter in 1856 due to deflections in his compass readings. Production at Creighton Mine began in 1901 under the Canadian Copper Company, and later the International Nickel Company (INCO). The mine was an open-pit mine from 1901 to 1908, and was transitioned to an underground mine in 1906. In 1969, the 7138-foot No. 9 shaft was completed, making it the deepest continuous mine shaft in the Western Hemisphere. Brazil's Vale announced a $19.4 billion takeover of INCO, which was approved in 2007. The company was known as Vale S.A. (Vale) from 2009 onwards.

=== The Creighton settlement ===
Creighton Mine employed 94 men in 1902, and built accommodations for the men and their families. In 1903, school classes and religious services were being held in one of the company cabins for the miner's families. As the workforce at the mine increased, the company constructed more single family homes with running water and electricity. As development continued, the company began to include rent, hydro, and employees club deductions on the company pay cheques.

In 1986, INCO announced that the company would be "getting out of the landlord business" due to the expense of maintaining the settlement to modern standards. The community of Creighton was closed on June 30, 1988.

== Geology ==
The Creighton Mine lies within the Sudbury Igneous Complex.

=== Formation of the Sudbury Igneous Complex ===
The Sudbury Igneous Complex (SIC) is an impact melt structure, formed by the collision of a meteor 1.85 billion years ago. The bolide impact created a crater 200 to 250 km across and melted the pre-existing rock, which partially filled in the crater. Today, the SIC is approximately 3 km thick, and has an elliptical footprint of approximately 60 km by 27 km.

An important geological unit within the SIC is the Sudbury Breccia, which is an impactite interpreted to have been formed during the impact crater modification or excavation. Copper, nickel, and PGE rich sulfides settled to the base of the molten Sudbury Breccia, and formed veins and stockworks of mineralization in the footwall (the non-igneous rocks underlying the SIC). Pre-existing weaknesses in the footwall play a crucial role in the distribution of these sulfide-rich structures. This results in a spatial association between the sulfide-rich ore deposit locations and the lithological contact between the footwall and the Sudbury Breccia. The contact between the SIC and the footwall is marked by "broad haloes of metalliferous hydrous silicate minerals", thought to be created by the early process of magmatic-hydrothermal fluid alteration and the late process of metamorphic fluid alteration.

=== Geology of the Creighton Mine ===
The Creighton Mine property is home to the South Range geologic unit, which contains the main orebody of the mine. The major mineralization occurs as platinum-group mineral (PGM)-rich intrusions within the footwall. Sulfide-rich base metal intrusions also contribute to the mine's mineralization. The amphibole within the ore body shifts from ferro-hornblende to ferro-tschermakite amphibole. This, along with the calcium and tantalum variations and an age of titanite of 1.616 billion years, has been interpreted to reflect an "increasing temperature-pressure gradient towards shear zones that were active during the Mazatzalian orogeny". It is also believed that the sulfides of this deposit were re-mobilized during this event.

A study on the formation of the ore body at the Creighton Mine indicates that the economic minerals crystallized from the sulfide melt early on in the cooling process. These minerals collected in embayments and in troughs at the base of the SIC along the footwall rock, forming "small pendants of ore" in the footwall rock. This type of mineralization is called contact type mineralization, as it occurs between the contact of the SIC and the underlying footwall. Sulfide mineralization on the property occurs as massive to disseminated sulfides, occurring as massive sulfides near the footwall and grading towards disseminated sulfides towards the hanging wall.

It is thought that the PGE sulfarsenides which display zoning, and the sperrylite, first crystallized from a 900°–1200° C sulfate melt. These minerals were then surrounded by disseminated sulfides and monosulfide solid solution cumulates (MSS) which crystallized from the now PGE sulfarsenide and sperrylite poor sulfide liquid. Subsequently, at either the hydrothermal or late magmatic stage, which occur at temperatures of less than 540°C, base metal recrystalization occurred with secondary hydrosilicates. It was at this point that the present michenerite was crystallized. The zonation of the sulfarsenides was preserved through a later stage of deformation caused by shear zones. However, the PGM were " corroded, fractures, and juxtaposed against silicates"

This process and the presence of MSS also helps account for the majority of palladium present in the pentlandite, as the present concentrations of pentlandite cannot solely be created by sulfide fractionation. It is thought that the palladium entered the pentlandite during its exsolution from the MSS, and that the palladium came from two sources; a small amount of palladium which originally partitioned in to the MSS, and "a larger quantity of Pd in the nearby Cu-rich portion (intermediate solid solution and/or Pd-bearing PGM)" This process lead to a depletion of the palladium sources, causing younger pentlandite which had formed later to contain lower amounts of palladium than older pentlandite.

=== Ore minerals ===
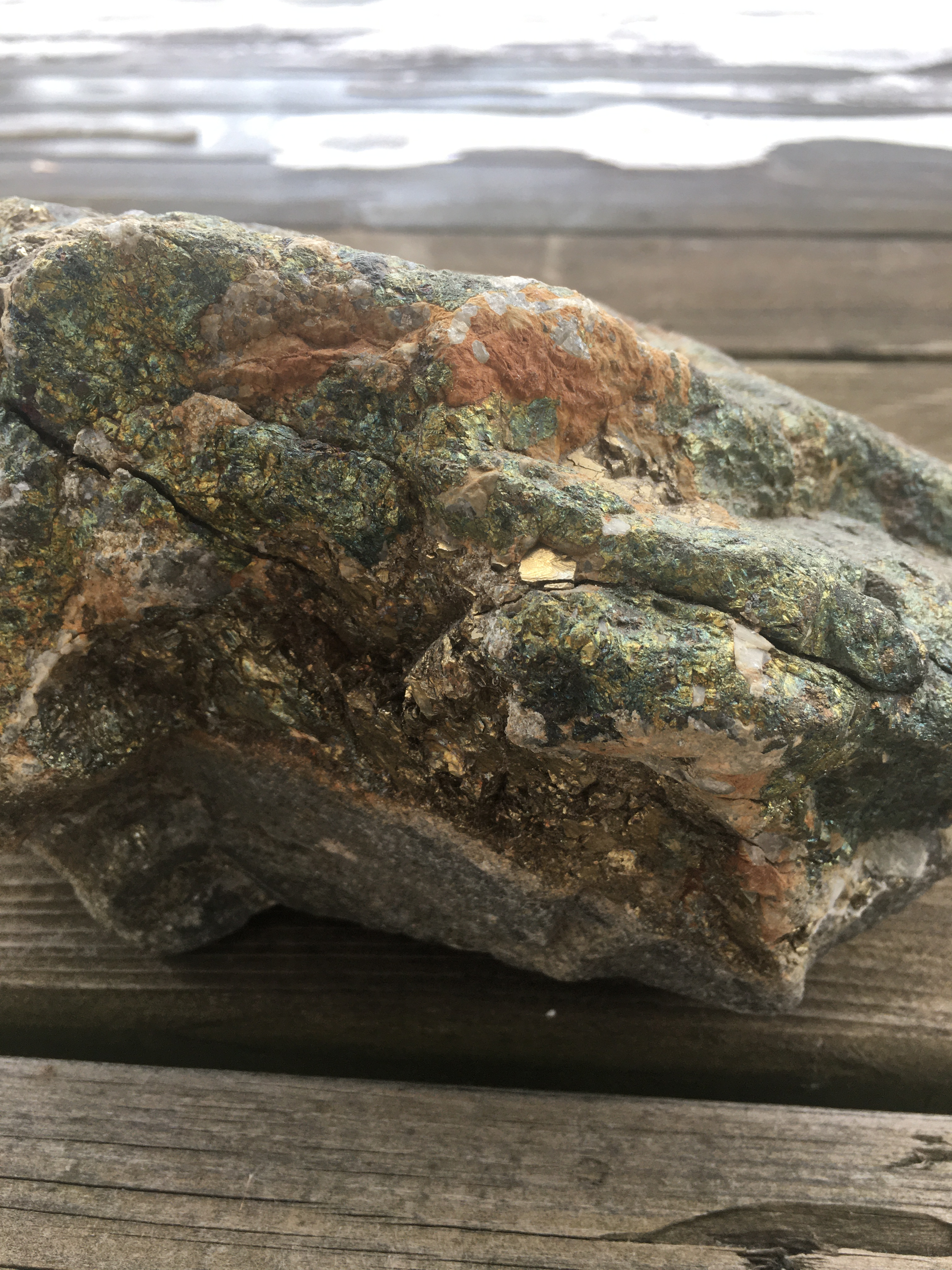
Sulfide-rich rock sample collected in the Greater Sudbury Area. Visibly contains chalcopyrite, arsenopyrite, pyrite, and quartz. Photo and sample provided by Kaitlyn de Moree.

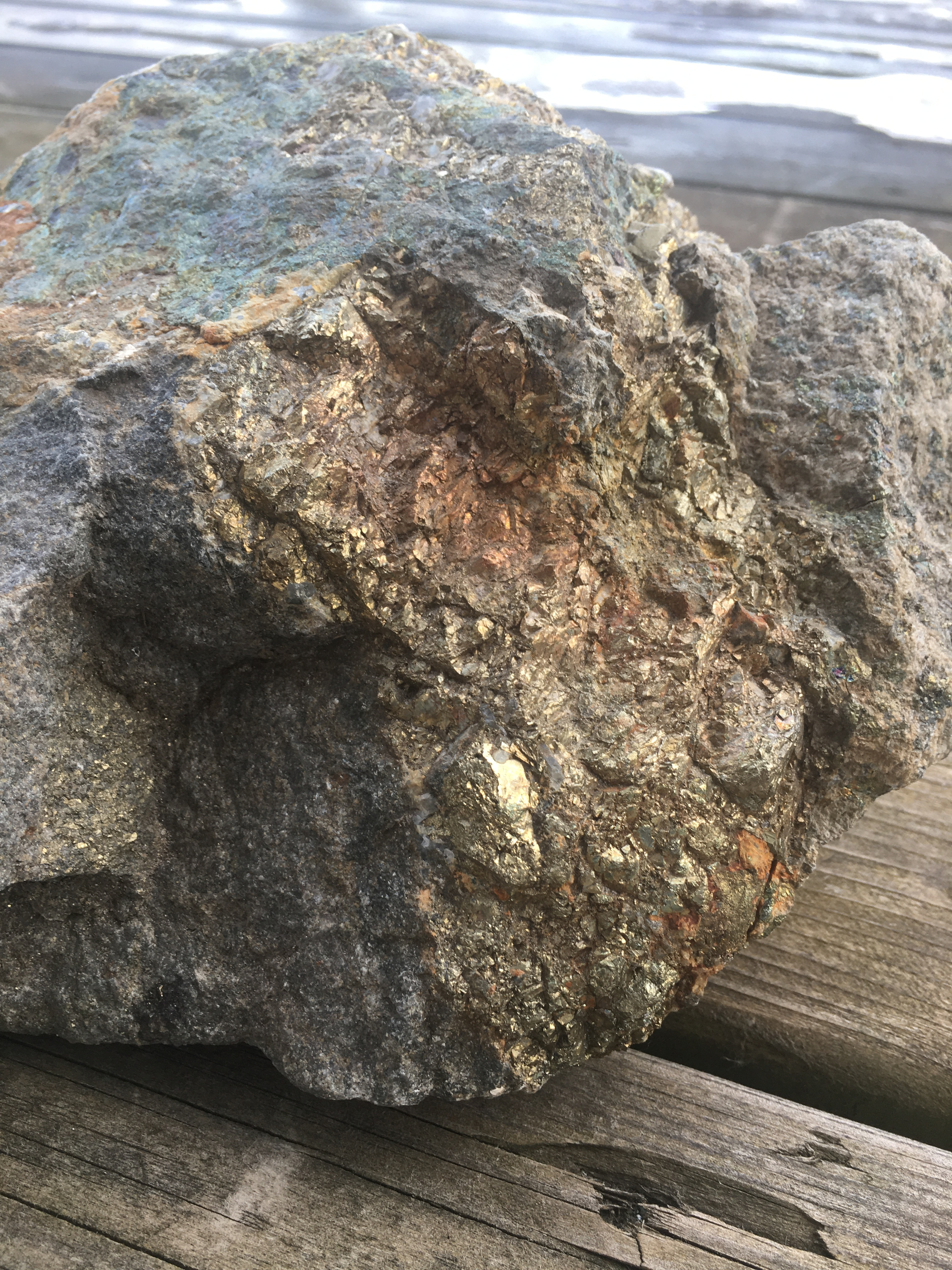
Pyrite, arsenopyrite, and chalcopyrite mineralization. Sulfide-rich rock sample collected in the Greater Sudbury Area. Photo and sample provided by Kaitlyn de Moree.

86% of the precious metal mineralogy at the mine consists of PGE sulfarsenides, 9% is sperrylite, 5% is michenerite, and 0.1% is electrum. These minerals are generally found hosted by pentlandite and pyrrhotite. Michenerite, however, is found near or hosted by silicate minerals. Euhedral zoning with an " irarsite (IrAsS) core, an outer layer of hollingworthite (RhAsS), and a PGE-rich Ni cobaltite rim (CoAsS)" is common of the PGE sulfarsenides found at the mine. Osmium bearing rhenium sulfides also have documented occurrences at Creighton Mine.

Common ore minerals found at the Creighton mine include chalcopyrite, cubanite, galena, ilmenite, magnetite, pentlandite, pyrite, and pyrrhotite. Less common and non-ore minerals which occur at the mine include altaite, argentopentlandite, arsenopyrite, biotite, bornite, cassiterite, cobaltite, epidote, froodite, gersdorffite, gold, heazlewoodite, hessite, hollingworthite, insizwaite, irarsite, kotulskite, marcasite, maslovite, melonite, merenskyite, michenerite, millerite, moncheite, muscovite, nickeline, parkerite, quartz, rutile, silver, sperrylite, sphalerite, stützite, tin, and tsumoite.

== Production ==
Creighton Mine is primarily a nickel, copper, and PGE mine, but also produces gold, silver, cobalt, selenium, and tellurium.

=== Mining methods ===
Since the first production of Creighton Mine in 1901, over 155 million tonnes of ore have been extracted. The mine was an open-pit mine from 1901 to 1908, and was transitioned to an underground mine in 1906. Currently, the mining methods used are bulk mining with the vertical retreat method (95% of production), and selective stoping with the mechanized cut-and-fill method (5% of ore production).

=== Production levels ===
In 2005, Creighton mine produced an average of 3,755 tons of ore per day on a 6 days per week schedule. 2007 was a breakthrough in mining extraction and exploration, with the conformation of mineralization at depth, which produced 793,000 tonnes of ore with grades of 1.62% copper and 2.8% nickel.. 2018 saw production rate reach 608,000 tones of ore with grades of 2.77% copper and 2.5% nickel. While 2019, saw 6,130,000 tonnes of ore produced, with copper grades of 2.67% and nickel grades of 2.68%. Ore is processed off site at Vale's Clarabelle Mill for nickel and copper, and the platinum group element (PGE) intermediates are sent to Vale's processing facility in Port Colborne, Ontario.

== Seismic events ==
Creighton mine contains four families and twelve total of shear zones. The deep nature of the mining and mineral exploration of the Creighton mine means that some of these local shear zones are re-mobilized during normal mining operations. This re-mobilization has resulted in several earthquakes and rock burst events felt in nearby Sudbury and the surrounding areas, with a total of 123 felt and unfelt seismic events between January 2000 and September 2013. These seismic events are generally between 0.0 and 4.0 Mn, and result in temporarily halting work at the mine.

A study on the seismicity due to work at the Creigton Mine has revealed that it is the minor, not the major, shear zones within the mine which account for the majority of the fault-slip seismicity. However, the major shear zones "influence the flow of stress" of the bedrock surrounding the excavation.

The rate of seismicity at the mine has been directly correlated with the amount of excavation occurring at the mine. Seismically quiet periods at the mine have been identified during labour-interruption periods in 2003, 2009–2010, and 2012. The seismicity rate of the mine is also affected by the geologic structures which are actively being excavated. One of the most seismically active structures of the mine, a footwall extension near the Plum shear zone of the 400 orebody, was actively being mined between 2001 and 2003. During this time, there was a marked and correlated increase in seismic activity.

=== Ground control ===
Because of the rate of seismicity, Creighton Mine employs a ground control program to monitor seismicity. The ground control program at Creighton Mine costs $20 million a year, and consists of a team of over 20 people along with a large network of smart cables and seismometers.

== SNOLAB ==
Creighton Mine's 6,800-foot (2,100 m) level is home to the world's deepest cleanest underground physics laboratory. Originally excavated for the Sudbury Neutrino Observatory (SNO), it has been expanded into a general-purpose facility called SNOLAB. The original laboratory, the SNO, was a heavy-water neutrino "Cherenkov detector". In 2004, a $7.5 million 3-story lab was constructed for the SNO on the grounds of the Creighton Mine, creating the foundation for the laboratories known today as SNOLAB. SNOLAB was initially constructed with $70 million in capital funds, and in 2020 received an additional $40.9 million in funding from Canada's Minister of Innovation.

== Creighton deepening project ==
In 2005, two projects were underway to allow deeper mining at Creighton Mine. The first was an $8-million, four-year diamond drill exploration program that will allow for ore tonnage to be defined down to the 10,000-foot (3,000 m) level. The second was a $48-million expansion project that established production ore at the 7,810-foot (2,380 m) level and was estimated to bring 1.8 million tons of high-grade ore into production from 2006 to 2011. This expansion was carried out by SCR Mining and Tunneling.

In 2007, Vale announced the exploration drilling increased the proven and probable reserves at the Creighton mine to 32 million tons of 2.2% nickel and 2 to 2.3% copper grading, up from the previously defined 17 million tons of 3.2% nickel and 2.5% copper grading. This exploration also led to the discovery of high grade PGE ore at the 2150 and 3200 meter mine levels.

In 2013, Phase 3 of the Creighton Mine Deep project was underway. This expansion project will cost $247 million, will increase the mine's depth to 8020 feet (2444 meters), and is estimated to increase the mine's lifespan to at least 2027.

== Environmental projects and concerns ==
=== Diesel to electric ===
In 2018, Vale announced they are transitioning their deep zone fleet of vehicles from diesel to electric. This is an ongoing project, as old equipment is replaced with electric equipment once it has reached the end of its life. This move towards electric vehicles not only reduces the environmental impact of the mine, but also allows for a reduction in heat generation and diesel contamination by these vehicles at depth.

=== Groundwater treatment ===
Groundwater naturally flows through the tailings area of the Creighton mine, posing an environmental contamination risk. To protect against contamination, groundwater from the tailings area is pumped to and treated at water treatment plants. Once treated, the water is discharged into the local watershed.

=== Underground greenhouse ===
The 4800 foot level of Creighton Mine is a fully automated greenhouse. This greenhouse grows approximately 100,000 jack and red pine trees, which will be used in regreening and remediation of the Sudbury basin.

== See also ==
- List of mines in Ontario
