= Southern Province (Canadian Shield) =

The Southern Province is a portion of Proterozoic rock that ranges in age from 2.5 billion to 600 million years old. It represents a subdivision of the much larger Canadian Shield and forms the bedrock of portions of Ontario, Canada and the U.S. states of Michigan and Minnesota. A few significant geologic features are situated in the Southern Province, including the Midcontinent Rift System and the Sudbury Igneous Complex.

== See also ==
- Geology of Ontario
