= Wahnapitae First Nation =

First Nation in Ontario, Canada

Coordinates: 46°46′23″N 80°48′40″W

- Band No. 232
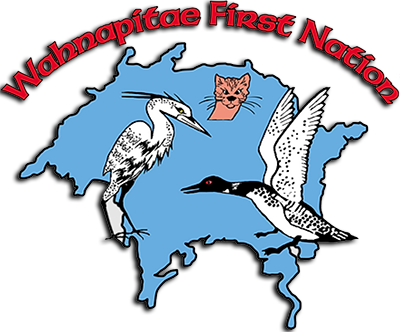
- Interactive map of Wahnapitae First Nation
- People: Anishinaabeg
- Treaty: Robinson Huron Treaty
- Headquarters: Capreol
- Province: Ontario

Land
- Main reserve: Wahnapitae 11
- Land area: 10.69 km^{2} (4.13 sq mi)

Population (2025)
- On reserve: 104
- Off reserve: 695
- Total population: 799

Government
- Chief: Larry Roque
- Council: Bob Pitfield; Terry Roque; Marnie Anderson; Jamie Roque

Tribal Council
- Waabnoong Bemjiwang Association of First Nations

Website
- wahnapitaefn.ca

Wahnapitae First Nation is an Anishinaabeg First Nation in the Canadian province of Ontario. It is located on the 10.69 km^{2} (4.13 sq mi) Wahnapitae 11 reserve on the northwestern shore of Lake Wanapitei, a semi-enclave bordered by the city of Greater Sudbury to the north and west. The band is a signatory to the Robinson-Huron Treaty of 1850.

== History ==
The name of the First Nation comes from the Anishinaabemowin name for Lake Wanapitei, Waanabidebiing, meaning "that place where the water is shaped like a tooth" and refers to the shape of the lake from above. In 1850, the band became signatories to the Robinson Huron Treaty as "Tagawinini and his Band".

The band's Chief, Tahgaiwenene, was one of three indigenous representatives selected to address Governor General James Bruce and Crown representative William Benjamin Robinson during negotiations at Garden River First Nation. Children of the band were sent to Jesuit day schools at Wiikwemkoong First Nation, which later became the Spanish Indian Residential Schools in 1913 until their closure in the 1960s.

== Demographics ==
For statistical purposes, the First Nation is part of the Greater Sudbury Census Metropolitan Area (CMA). In 2025, The First Nation had a population of 799 with 104 living on reserve at Wahnapitae 11.

== Economy ==
Hiawatha's Restaurant and Marina, formerly Rocky's, is a long-established restaurant in the community with five cabin rentals. A nurse practitioner clinic, the Norman Recollet Health Centre, opened in 2019, and a 20,000 square feet (1,900 m^{2}) sound stage was completed in 2025.

The First Nation has also signed mining agreements with Vale Canada, Glencore, and KGHM. For postal delivery and telephone exchange purposes, the First Nation is considered part of the nearby Greater Sudbury community of Capreol.

== Government ==
The First Nation is governed by a council which consists of five elected positions, including Chief. It is also a member of the Waabnoong Bemjiwang Association of First Nations tribal council.

== See also ==
- List of First Nations band governments
- List of Indian reserves in Canada
- N'Swakamok Native Friendship Centre
