= Native Friendship Centre of Montreal =

The Native Friendship Centre of Montreal (French: Centre d'amitié autochtone de Montréal) is a Native Friendship Centre for Indigenous people in Montreal. It opened in 1974 (as a drop-in centre) located on Bishop Street in Montreal. In 1975 it became incorporated and two years later it moved to a location in the Côte-des-Neiges district, before moving to its current location at 2001 Saint Laurent Boulevard in 1995.

At first it did not receive financial support from the province or city, which both argued that Status Indians were a matter of federal jurisdiction. However, many aboriginal people served by the centre do not have status.

In 1987 the Native Woman's Shelter of Montreal was established. In 1990 another social epidemic was addressed with the organization of the first Native AIDS/HIV Conference in Quebec. In 1993, the Urban Aboriginal Economic Development Department was established.

The Native Friendship Centre does not endorse any particular world religious traditions but supports First Nations traditional spiritual practices. As well, visitors may participate if they choose to do so.

Wellness sessions with elders who visit and provide individual guidance, lead healing circles and organize sweat lodges from time to time. Courses on drum making and native arts and crafts are also available. The concept of culture and identity are depicted through the Native American art work displayed in the centre by local artists to keep the focus of their journey through city life. The centre also distributes various newsletters and papers from many communities within the province and throughout Canada for those who are looking for a connection with their hometown and respective Nations.

== Mission statement ==
The mission of the Native Friendship Centre of Montreal (NFCM) is to promote, develop and enhance the quality of life of Montreal's Urban Indigenous community. The Native Friendship Centre of Montreal is part of a regional and national initiative that bridges the gap between two cultures.

== Current activities ==
To keep up with the growing demand for various activities among those who frequent the centre whether temporarily or long-term have become diverse and plentiful. These activities are aimed at keeping everyone occupied while visiting or living in the city. There are services such as translation services (from varying aboriginal tongues to English and French) and bilingual web media for a calendar of events.

Social outings such as Laser Quest outings, bowling trips, movie outings give everyone a change in venue. Classes in bead work, arts and crafts, cooking and drum making are a vital tradition to pass down to everyone. Psychological and medical counseling services such as medical transportation arrangement services for those who are not from the area or province. This includes arranging transportation to and from medical appointments or travel terminals. More technical services also provided on certain days of the week including legal services for those who may have had an encounter with the law while visiting the areas of Montreal or for those who are new to the area and seek legal counsel for common questions and concerns.

Health workshops activities include the Diabetes Prevention Project, Ka’wahse (Homeless Street Patrol), and Hep C HIV/AIDS Prevention and Outreach Project, and participation in academic studies.

Job Search Workshops and Life skills Programs such as the Job Search and Human Relations or FNHRDCQ/EPOC Training Initiative.

Youth and adult programs on two separate calendars of events such as daily activities and outings.

Membership is given upon registration and entitles access to all featured in the facility.

In 1997, it opened a Head Start child care program.

== Current organizational features ==
The NFCM employs about 25 staff members with a full roster of volunteers who are given commendation for their efforts. Funding is mostly obtained by private donations, Band and Tribal Councils, Provincial and Federal Funding for Aboriginal Youth Programs, as most of the projects and campaigns are directly funded by the various organizations who welcome them such as the HIV/AIDS initiative as well as solidarity in movements against violence. The shortage of housing which plagues most First Nations communities has trickled into the Montreal community where those residents are seeking salvation and coming to the Native Friendship Centre for shelter, help and guidance. Many especially the Inuit are homeless and much has been done to help them through their hard times.

== See also ==
- N'Swakamok Native Friendship Centre, Sudbury
