= Sudbury dike swarm =

Large geological structure in Canada

The Sudbury dike swarm, also called the Sudbury dikes, is a Mesoproterozoic dike swarm in northeastern Ontario, Canada. With an age of 1,238 million years, it is younger than the Sudbury Basin impact event and predates the impact event that formed Lake Wanapitei.
