= Native Friendship Centre =

Indigenous community centre in Canada

Friendship Centres are nonprofit community organizations that provide services to urban Inuit, Métis, and First Nations (Status and Non-status) people. Friendship Centres were first established in the 1950s, and there are now more than 100 centres across Canada. Friendship Centres typically provide a variety of programs and services to its members, which can include youth programs, health services, housing, employment, cultural programs, and more.

== History of the Friendship Centre Movement ==
Friendship Centres emerged out a grassroots movement in the 1950s. The Friendship Centre Movement worked to establish organizations that could provide programs and services to a growing number of Indigenous people who had migrated to urban centres. This migration was largely a result of enfranchisement and assimilation policies in Canada, that meant many people were not allowed to return to their home communities and were forced to relocate to towns and cities.

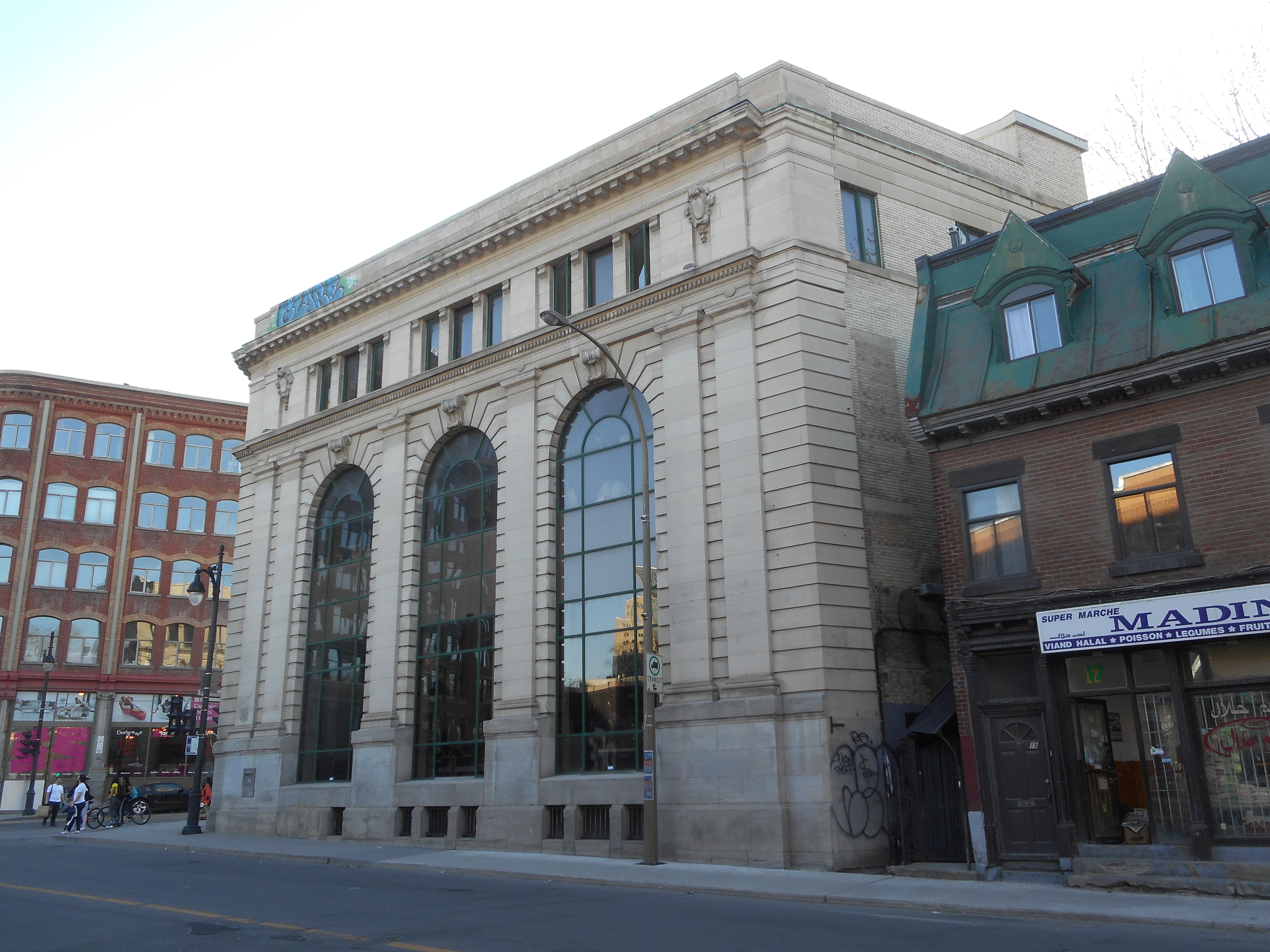
Native Friendship Centre of Montréal

Some of the earliest Friendship Centres in Canada include the North American Indian Club, which was registered as a society in Toronto, Ontario, in 1951, the Coqualeetza Fellowship Club which opened its doors in 1952 in Vancouver, British Columbia, and the Indian and Métis Friendship Centre in Winnipeg, Manitoba. By 1968, there were 26 Friendship Centres in Canada. That number grew to 80 in 1983, and 118 in 2009.

== Provincial Territorial Associations ==
Friendship Centres may be represented by multiple associations at the national or provincial level. There are 7 Provincial Territorial Associations (PTAs) in Canada including the National Association of Friendship Centres (NAFC), Ontario Federation of Indigenous Friendship Centres (OFIFC), Aboriginal Friendship Centres of Saskatchewan, Manitoba Association of Friendship Centres, Alberta Native Friendship Centres Association, BC Association of Aboriginal Friendship Centres, and the Northwest Territories/Nunavut Council of Friendship Centres.

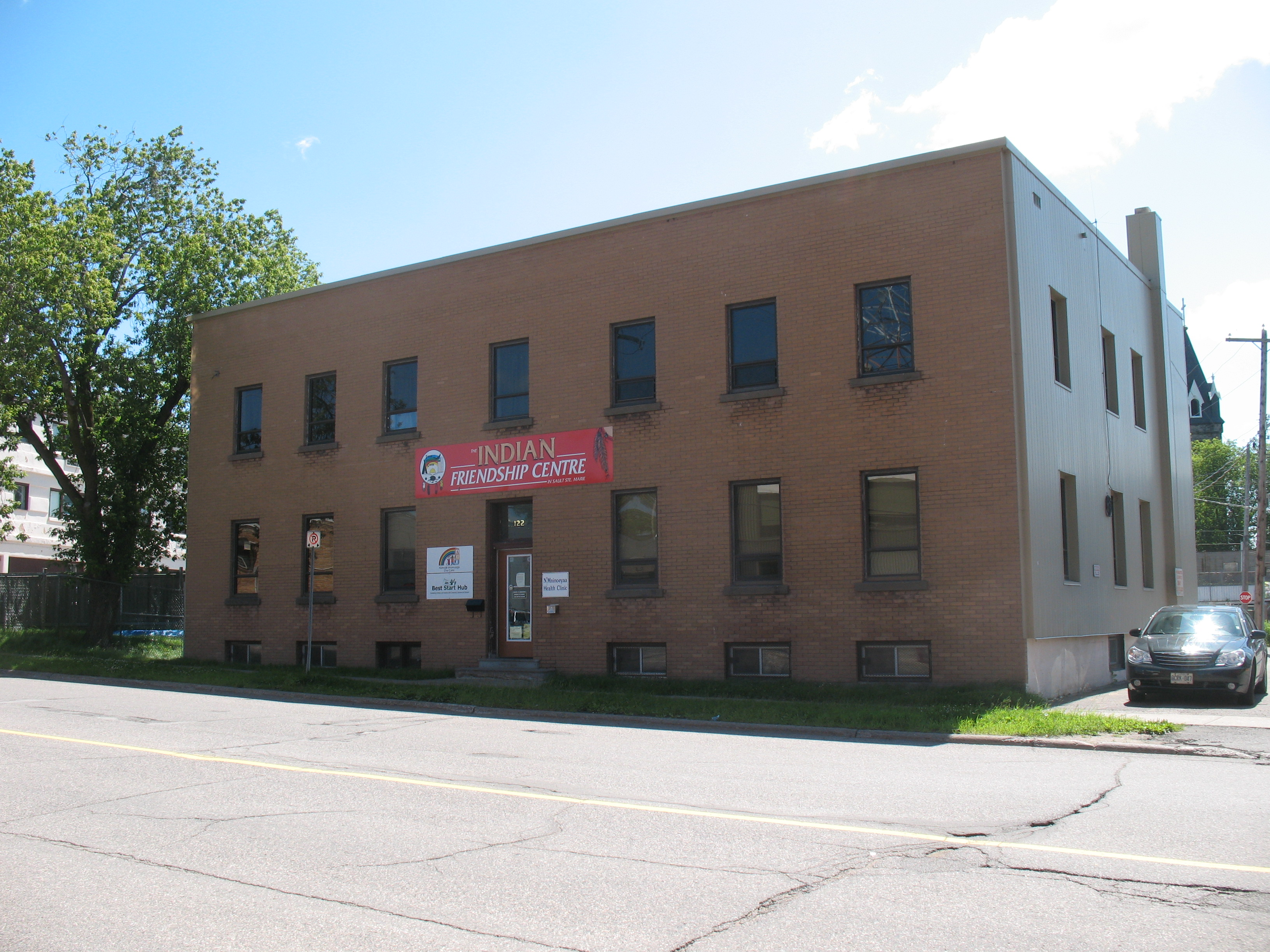
Sault Indian Friendship Centre

=== National Association of Friendship Centres ===
The National Association of Friendship Centres (NAFC) was established in 1972 to represent the growing number of Friendship Centres at the national level.

The primary objectives are: to act as a central unifying body for the Friendship Centre Movement: to promote and advocate the concerns of Aboriginal Peoples: and, to represent the needs of local Friendship Centres across the country to the federal government and to the public in general.

The NAFC is a non-profit organization governed by a voluntary Board of Directors composed of eleven regional representatives and a youth representative. There is also a five-member Executive Committee, composed of the president, vice-president, secretary, treasurer and youth executive.

The composition of the NAFC Board of Directors is determined by the PTA's, which each appoint one representative. Where no PTA exists, the Friendship Centre can appoint one representative. Executive Committee members are elected for two year terms, at staggered intervals, at the Annual General Meeting (AGM) of the Association. The AGM is attended by delegates from each member Centre and each PTA.

The NAFC Board of Directors meets quarterly during the year and the Executive Committee normally meets once between each of these meetings, or when special circumstances arise.

The NAFC also monitors the activities and programs of various federal government departments which have a mandate to provide either funding or services to urban Aboriginal people.

The NAFC further acts as a central communications body and facilitates external liaisons for both the Friendship Centres and the PTA's. This function ensures that the membership has timely access to information which may impact on their operations. The NAFC is also active on a number of external committees and associations which are related to urban Aboriginal people in areas such as: literacy, racism, AIDS, employment equity, economic development and justice to name a few.

==== Programs and service delivery ====
Friendship Centres offer a variety of programs and services in a culturally appropriate manner, practising an open-door policy where anyone, regardless of race, religion, income or nationality can access programs.

Visitors to Friendship Centres can often find access to referral and advocacy services, cultural programs, education and training, employment counselling, health programs, justice programs, children and youth programs, recreation programs and economic development. Friendship Centres also offer language training, entrepreneurial training, skills development, computer training, work site placements, nutrition programs, healing circles, alcohol and drug counselling, summer camps, day care centres, youth peer counselling, youth drop in centres, organized sports and leagues, wilderness training and facility rentals. Many Centres also have arts and crafts shops and organize pow-wows and other events throughout the year.

Friendship Centres provide over 1.3 million client contacts across Canada within the programs and services offered every year.

==== Senate ====
Part of the Friendship Centre Movement, senators are individuals who are recognized for representing a set of values which reflect past developments of the Movement while allowing the current leadership and Membership the right to define their own direction. The Senate are established by and part of the National Association of Friendship Centres governing Constitution and Bylaws.

Senators attend as advisors, on a rotating basis, all meetings of the Board of Directors, Annual General Meetings and other such special meetings of the membership, when invited.

==== Aboriginal Youth Council ====
The Aboriginal Youth Council (AYC) discusses and identifies youth priority issues, including stay in school initiatives; healing and wellness; suicide; preserving culture and heritage; cross cultural awareness; homelessness; youth leadership; employment and training; youth involvement at all levels of the Friendship Centre Movement; and more specifically, youth involvement in the decision-making processes of the Movement.

The AYC defines youth as being between the ages of 14 and 24.

== Funding Programs for Friendship Centres ==
In 1972 the Government of Canada formally recognized the viability of Friendship Centres and implemented the Migrating Native Peoples Program (MNPP). The MNPP was given a four-year mandate to provide 40 Friendship Centres and the NAFC with core operating funds. In 1976 the MNPP was extended for one year in order to evaluate the program's effectiveness. In 1978, the program was renewed with a five-year mandate and enhanced resources which enabled and expansion to 80 Friendship Centres by 1983.

In 1983, the NAFC and the Department of the Secretary of State (DSOS) successfully negotiated the evolution of the MNPP to the Native Friendship Centre Program (NFCP). This program had a five-year mandate and in 1988, the NFCP was renewed as the Aboriginal Friendship Centres Program (AFCP), which became a permanent funding program. However, the funding relationship fundamentally changed in 1996, when the administrative responsibility for the AFCP was transferred from the Department of Canadian Heritage to the NAFC. This new agreement meant that all operational funding for the AFCP would be administered by the NAFC to the local Friendship Centres and the PTAs.

== See also ==
- N'Swakamok Native Friendship Centre, in Sudbury
- Native Friendship Centre of Montreal
- Jocelyne Gros-Louis founder of Quebec Native Friendship Centre
