= Impact melt =

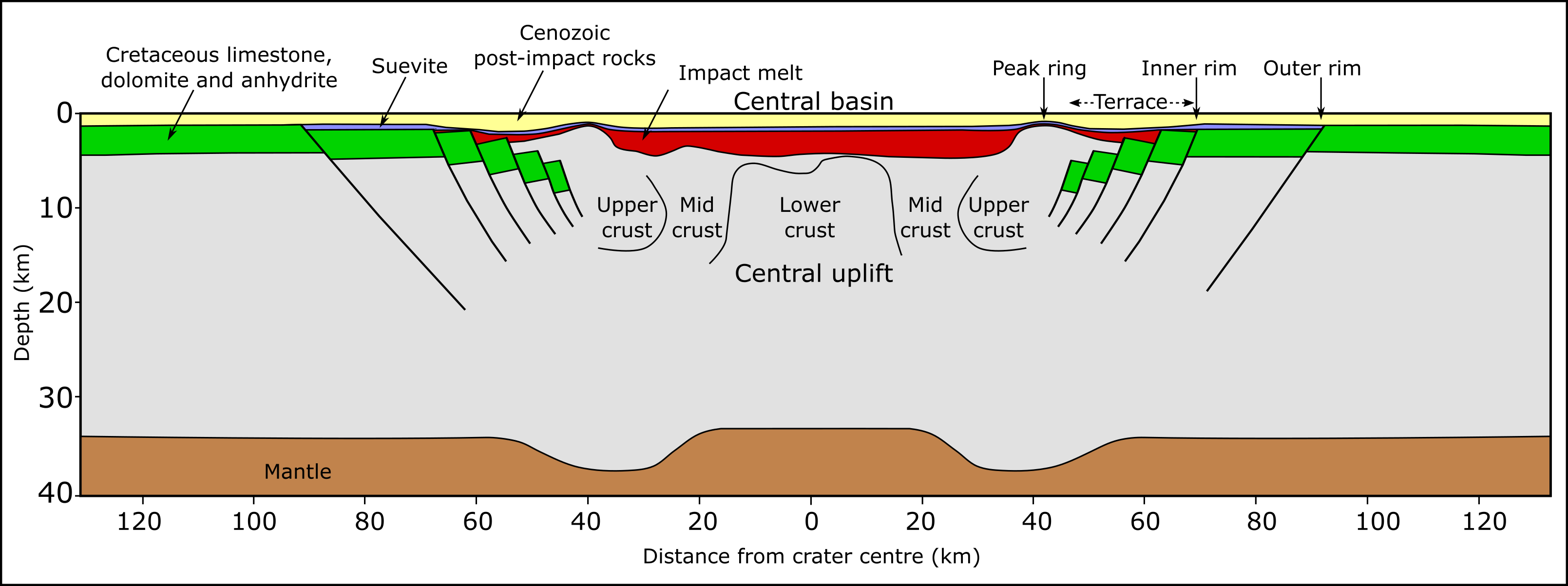
Scematic section over the Chicxulub crater, showing the interpreted extent of impact melt

Impact melt flow on the southeastern flank of Tycho on the Moon

Impact melting is the result of hypervelocity impact events on the surface of a planetary body, causing whole-rock melting of the target rocks (the existing rocks beneath the impact site). Impact melts have been recognised from many terrestrial impact structures, such as the Sudbury and Chicxulub structures. Evidence of melting has also been found associated with many lunar impact structures such as Tycho and Necho. Impact melts have also been identified on Mars, Mercury and Venus.

== Formation mechanism ==
Melting of the target rocks during an impact event is caused by the generation of waste heat energy during decompression after the initial high-pressure shock wave caused by the impact. This heat may lead to wholesale melting and vaporisation, although the ease with which this occurs is affected by the compressibility of the materials involved. The more compressible they are, the more likely they are to melt at any given shock pressure, as is demonstrated by the common occurrence of melted lunar regolith, while neighbouring crystalline rocks are not affected. Impact melting occurs as part of a highly dynamic process, with the melts produced moving rapidly into the transient cavity created by the impact.

== Impact melt products ==
The types of melt products produced by the impact will depend mainly on the amount of melt generated, its subsequent history within the impact structure, including the rate at which it cools. Rapid cooling of melts produces glass of two main types: mineral glasses, which have the composition of the minerals that they derive from, and rock glasses that represent the result of melting of the whole rock. Mineral glasses may be produced at grain contacts and have a mixed composition reflecting the minerals involved. Slower cooling, which allows mineral growth to occur, produces textures similar to other igneous rocks. Tektites are also a product of impact melting, being formed as balistic ejecta, derived from the shallowest part of the target rock in the earliest stage of the impact.

== Occurrence ==
Impact melts have been found associated with about half of terrestrial impacts. Most such melts are found within the crater itself, although in the Nördlinger Ries structure, such rocks have been found outside the crater, lying directly over ejecta deposits, indicating that they were emplaced as flows after the crater formation. Such flows are commonly observed around lunar impact craters.

== Examples ==
=== Earth ===
Geological map of the Sudbury Basin from Litza et al. (2026)

The Chicxulub crater is well-preserved, although it is buried beneath about 1 km of post-impact sedimentary rocks. Investigations of the crater using geophysical methods backed up by borehole data has identified an up to 3 km thick layer of melt rocks. Drilling of the peak ring by borehole M0077A found evidence of two compositionally distinct melt layers. The upper impact melt (UIM) has a composition similar to the underlying basement rocks but with significant added component of a carbonate (limestone) source, also shown by the presence of limestone clasts in the UIM. Deeper in the M0077A borehole, another unit was found, the lower impact melt-bearing (LIMB) unit with a composition that matched the known basement lithologies. The UIM, also encountered in the Yaxcopoil-1, Yucatan-1 and Chicxulub-1 boreholes, is interpreted to be a relatively thin layer of melt that interacted with material falling back into the crater.

At Sudbury, the impact melt, confined within the crater, cooled to form the Sudbury Igneous Complex. This large igneous body has been uplifted and deformed during subsequent mountain building events and eroded down to form the current elliptical remnant. After impact, as the melt cooled, it became differentiated to form the compositional layering that is now observed, with norite, passing up into quartz gabbro and granophyre. The lower part of the norite, known as the norite sub-layer, contains large mineral deposits in the form of nickel and copper sulphides and platinum group metals. Sulphide melts are immiscible in silicate melts and, due to their greater density, tend to form a separate layer towards the base of the overall melt. At Sudbury these sulphide melts accumulated at irregularities in the crater floor, where they also differentiated.

=== Moon ===
Impact melt deposits associated with the crater Tycho have been mapped in detail. Their distribution has been used to interpret the crater as resulting from an oblique impact. Remnant impact melt has been interpreted from the crest of the crater's central peak. Melt deposits are interpreted to cover the crater floor based on their morphology. Further melt pools and flows have been identified in topographic lows both in the crater walls and outside the crater.
