= Lake Wanapitei =

Lake in Ontario, Canada

- Waanabidebiing (Ojibwe)
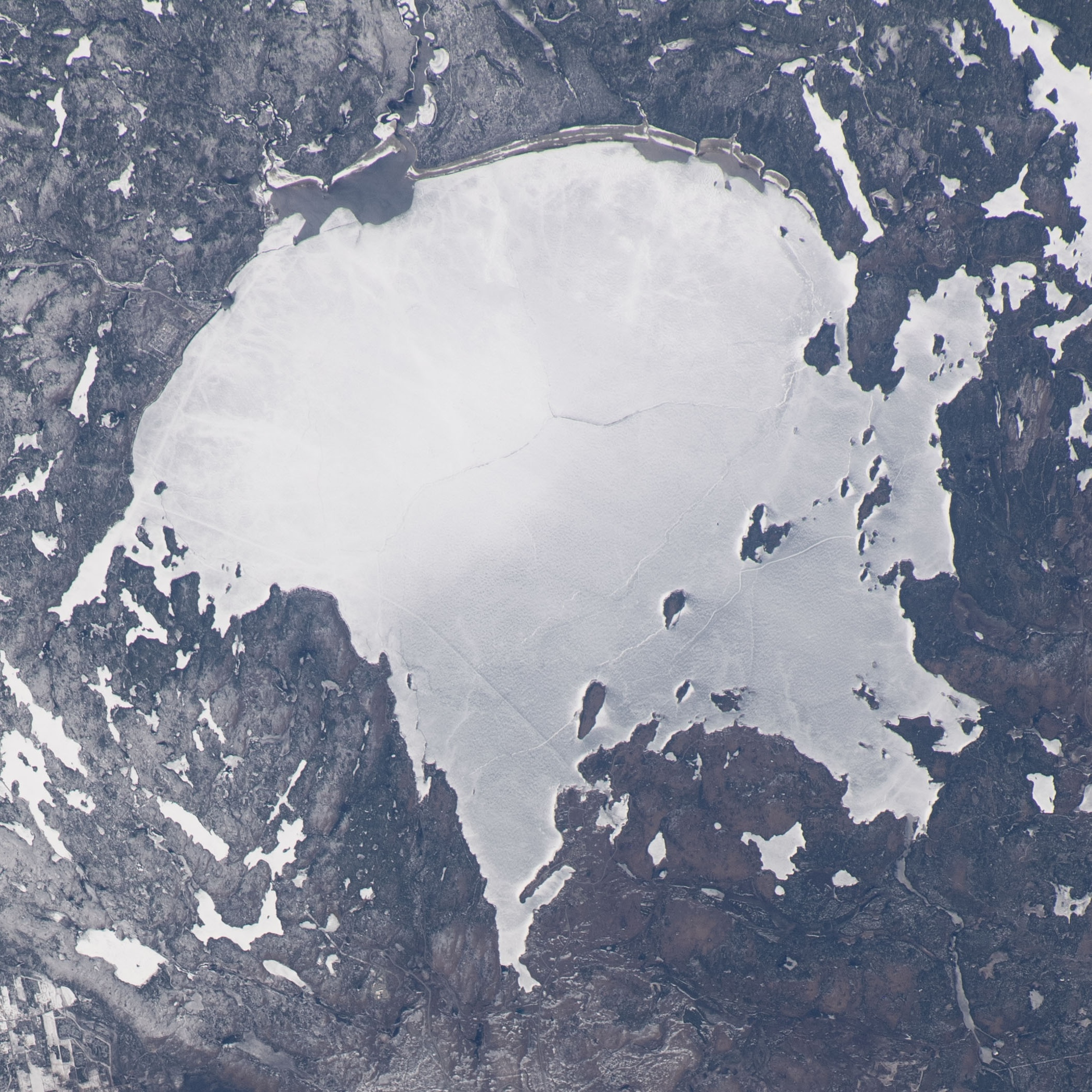
- Lake Wanapitei seen from the International Space Station on April 22, 2020.

- Location within Ontario
- Location: Sudbury, Ontario
- Coordinates: 46°45′N 80°45′W
- Type: Impact crater lake
- Primary inflows: Wanapitei River
- Primary outflows: Wanapitei River
- Basin countries: Canada
- Max. length: 16.5 km (10.3 mi)
- Max. width: 14 km (8.7 mi)
- Surface area: 132.57 km^{2} (51.19 sq mi)
- Max. depth: 142 m (466 ft)
- Shore length^{1}: 160.4 km (99.7 mi)
- Surface elevation: 267 m (876 ft)
- Settlements: Boland's Bay, Skead, Wahnapitae First Nation
- ^{1} Shore length is not a well-defined measure.

Lake Wanapitei (Ojibwe: Waanabidebiing) is an impact crater lake within the city of Greater Sudbury, Ontario, Canada and Wahnapitae First Nation. Adjacent to the nearby but unrelated Sudbury impact crater, it is one of the world's largest lakes entirely located within the boundary of a single municipality.

The crater itself is 5.2 mi (8.4 km) in diameter, with an estimated age of 37.2 ± 1.2 million years, dating it to the Eocene period. The Anishinaabemowin name for the lake, Waanabidebiing, means "place where the water is shaped like a tooth" and refers to the shape of the lake from above.

== Geography ==
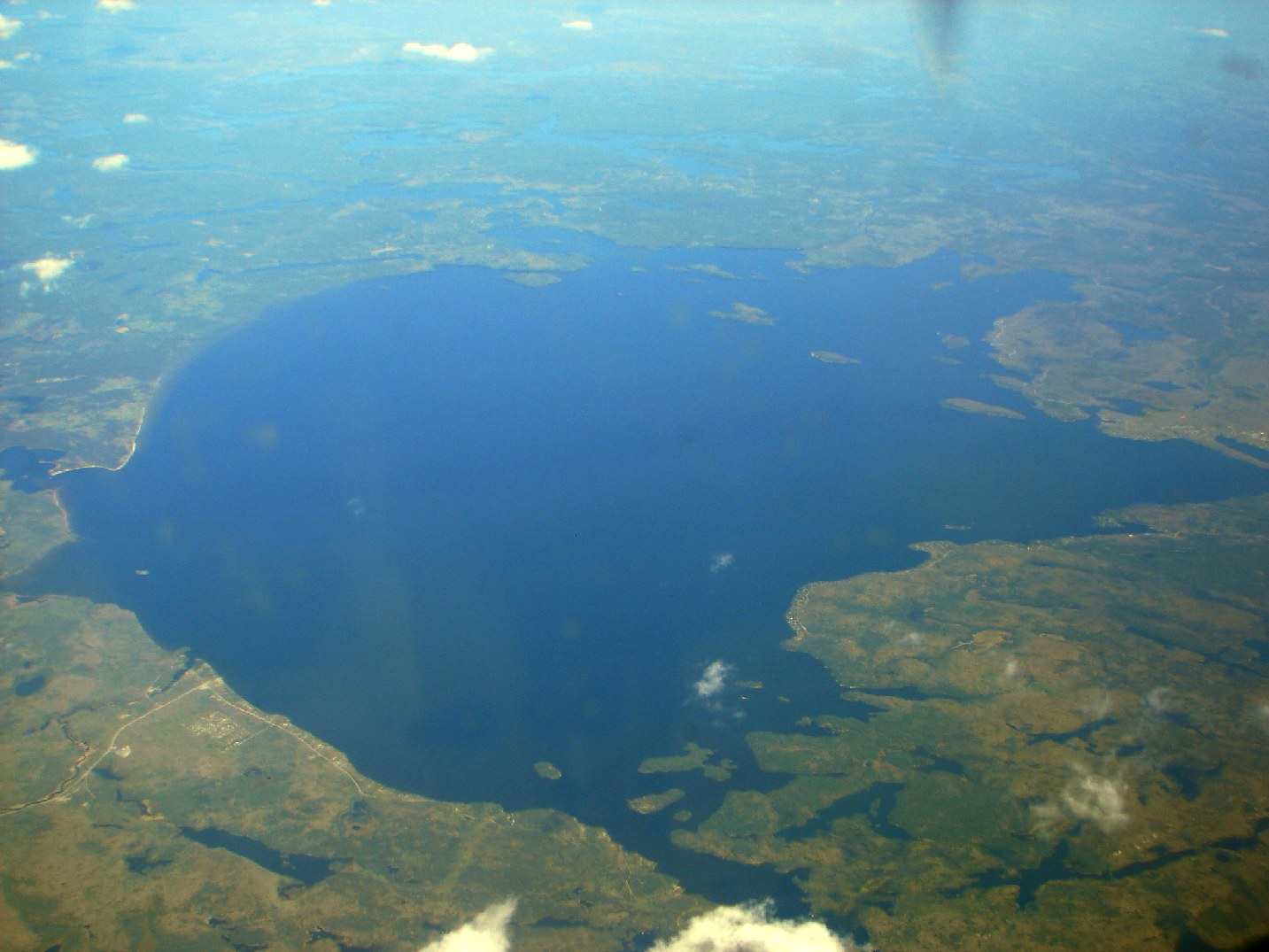
Lake Wanapitei from above in 2008

The Lake Wanapitei impact, which created the crater lake, was estimated to have been formed 37.2 ± 1.2 million years ago during the Eocene period. A 2003 study proposed that the crater itself is between three and four kilometres in diameter, while also proposing that it may have been formed by large scale faulting. Another study in 2006 compared the crater to the Popigai, Chesapeake Bay, Mistastin and Haughton impact craters.

The Wanapitei River flows through the lake, and the lake itself is located within the Lake Wanapitei Subwatershed of the Great Lakes Basin watershed. The subwatershed includes 174.6 square kilometres (67.4 sq mi) of forests, 148.44 square kilometres (57.31 sq mi) of lakes, and 28.86 square kilometres (11.14 sq mi) of wetlands. Within the subwatershed is the Wolf Lake Forest Reserve covering 40.99 square kilometres (15.83 sq mi) of old growth red pine forest. The reserve contains trees estimated to be around 300 years old.

== Human history ==
Lake Wanapitei is part of the traditional territory of the Wahnapitae First Nation, a signatory to the Robinsion Huron Treaty of 1850. The fur trade and later logging brought Europeans to the region, with the towns of Boland's Bay and Skead settled on its southern shore. In the 1960s, six RCMP officers drowned in the lake during a training exercise.

== Recreation ==
Wanapitei Provincial Park, a non-operating natural environment park, is located on the northern shore of the lake. The lake is a popular recreational area in the region, with activities including fishing, snowmobiling, and camping. The lake has 370 permanent residents and 180 seasonal residents on its shores, including islands.

== See also ==
- List of lakes in Ontario
- List of provincial parks of Northern Ontario
