= Grenville Front Tectonic Zone =

The Grenville Front Tectonic Zone is a geological feature in Eastern Canada that separates the Superior craton from rocks of the Grenville orogeny. It is a large tectonic zone of the Canadian Shield, extending from the northern shore of Lake Huron through Ontario and Quebec to Labrador, a distance of about 1,900 km (1,200 mi).
