= Sudbury Igneous Complex =

Coordinates: 46.61°N 81.19°W

Geological map of the Sudbury Basin from Litza et al. (2026)

The Sudbury Igneous Complex (SIC) is a 1,844 million year-old impact melt sheet in Greater Sudbury, Northern Ontario, Canada. It is part of the Sudbury Basin impact structure. It was formed by melting of the rocks beneath the impact site from the waste heat generated by decompression following the hypervelocity impact. The impact melt sheet ponded inside the impact crater. Over time, the melt differentiated forming compositional layering.

== Structure ==
The SIC has an elliptical outcrop that forms part of an eroded asymmetric syncline, with post-impact rocks of the Whitewater Group preserved in the core of the fold. The northern part of the SIC, exposed in the North Range, which dips moderately to the south, shows comparatively little deformation, while the southern limb of the syncline in the South Range, which is steeply dipping to overturned, is strongly deformed. This part of the SIC is affected by the South Range Shear Zone, which appears as a set of mylonitic ductile faults.

== Layers ==
Four main layers have been distinguished within the SIC, the upper three of which are generally referred to as the "Main Mass". At the top of the intrusion there is a layer of granophyre, further subdivided into the plagioclase granophyre, locally developed at the top of the granophyre unit, the MPEG (micropegmatite), which forms the bulk of the unit and the locally developed Crow's Foot granophyre, which is transitional to the underlying quartz gabbro. The quartz gabbro is a relatively thin layer and is sometimes referred to as the "transition zone", reflecting its gradational boundaries with both the overlying granophyre and the underlying norite layers. The norite is also subdivided into an upper felsic norite (FNR) overlying a lower melanonorite (MNR). The upper part of the FNR would be a gabbro under current classification schemes as orthopyroxene is replaced by clinopyroxene. Beneath the MNR, at the base of the Main Mass, is a magmatic breccia layer, with a matrix of either granite or norite, which is known as the "Sublayer". The Sublayer contains the bulk of the mineralisation beneath the Main Mass. It varies greatly in thickness, being missing in several parts of the structure but thickening into the embayments and troughs at the base of the SIC.

The Offset Dykes area a series of concentric and radial dykes that extend out from the base of the rest of the SIC into the surrounding country rock. They are mainly of quartz diorite composition (strictly quartz monzodiorite) with mineralised inclusions.

== Formation ==
The Sudbury area was struck by a meteorite in the range 10–15 km in diameter about 1.85 billion years ago, during the Paleoproterozoic era. This hypervelocity impact produced a high pressure shock wave in the target rocks (the existing rocks beneath the impact site). During the decompression that followed large, quantities of waste heat were generated, leading to wholesale melting (and to some extent vaporization) of the target rocks. The resultant melt sheet filled the crater that was formed, where it subsequently cooled, creating the SIC. As it continued to cool, the silicate part of the melt differentiated, producing the observed compositional layering. Before any silicate crystallization, the magma became saturated in sulfur, leading to the segregation of sulfide melts due to their immiscibility. As the sulfide melts are much denser than the enclosing silicate melts they moved downwards towards the base of the SIC, where they accumulated in depressions within the basal surface.

The Offset Dykes are thought to have been injected into the country rock very soon after crater formation. There is evidence of two-phase intrusion, with mineral inclusion-rich quartz diorite found at the center of some of the dykes.

== Modification ==
Soon after formation, the geometry of the Sudbury impact structure was probably similar to that known for the Chicxulub crater, an unmodified impact structure of similar scale. However, the impact occurred during the Penokean orogeny, and the crater, and the SIC were modified by the later stages of this event. The orogeny resulted in crustal shortening, with the formation of low-angle thrust faults.
