= Conservation Ontario =

Conservation authority in Ontario

- Formation: 1980
- Type: Umbrella conservation organization
- Location: Newmarket, Ontario
- General Manager: Angela Coleman
- Website: conservationontario.ca

Conservation Ontario is a non-profit network of Ontario’s 36 conservation authorities in Ontario, Canada. Conservation Authorities are local, watershed management agencies that deliver services and programs that protect and manage water and other natural resources in partnership with government, landowners and other organizations.

The 1946 Conservation Authorities Act provides the means by which the province and municipalities of Ontario could join to form a conservation authority within a specific area - the watershed - to undertake programs of natural resource management.

Conservation authorities are mandated to ensure the conservation, restoration and responsible management of Ontario's water, land and natural habitats through programs that balance human, environmental and economic needs. There are currently 36 conservation authorities in Ontario. Most management programs occur in parks known as conservation areas.

Key areas of Authority activity include:

- Environmental protection — Conservation authorities protect local ecosystems and contribute to the quality of life in communities throughout the province.
- Water Resource Management — Conservation authorities are Ontario's community-based environmental experts who use integrated, ecologically sound environmental practices to manage Ontario's water resources on a watershed basis, maintain secure supplies of clean water, protect communities from flooding and contribute to municipal planning processes (that protect water). The organization issues report cards detailing surface water quality, groundwater quality, and forest conditions.

== Ontario Conservation Authorities ==
- Ausable Bayfield Conservation Authority
- Cataraqui Region Conservation Authority
- Catfish Creek Conservation Authority
- Central Lake Ontario Conservation Authority
- Conservation Halton
- Conservation Sudbury
- Credit Valley Conservation
- Crowe Valley Conservation Authority
- Essex Region Conservation Authority
- Ganaraska Region Conservation Authority
- Grand River Conservation Authority
- Grey Sauble Conservation
- Hamilton Conservation Authority
- Kawartha Conservation
- Kettle Creek Conservation Authority
- Lake Simcoe Region Conservation Authority
- Lakehead Region Conservation Authority
- Long Point Region Conservation Authority
- Lower Thames Valley Conservation Authority
- Lower Trent Conservation
- Maitland Valley Conservation Authority
- Mattagami Region Conservation Authority
- Mississippi Valley Conservation
- Niagara Peninsula Conservation Authority
- North Bay-Mattawa Conservation Authority
- Nottawasaga Valley Conservation Authority
- Otonabee Conservation
- Quinte Conservation
- Raisin Region Conservation Authority
- Rideau Valley Conservation Authority
- Saugeen Conservation
- Sault Ste. Marie Region Conservation Authority
- South Nation Conservation
- St. Clair Region Conservation Authority
- Toronto and Region Conservation Authority
- Upper Thames River Conservation Authority

== See also ==
- Niagara Parks Commission
- National Capital Commission
- St. Lawrence Parks Commission
- Great Lakes / St. Lawrence Seaway System
- Ottawa River Waterway
- Ontario Parks
- Parks Canada
- Société des établissements de plein air du Québec (SEPAQ)
