= Grey Sauble Conservation Authority =

Conservation authority in Ontario, Canada

- Founded: 1985; 41 years ago
- Region served: Bruce Peninsula
- Website: www.greysauble.on.ca

Grey Sauble Conservation Authority (GSCA), is a conservation authority in Ontario. It was created in 1985 with the merger of North Grey Region Conservation Authority and the Sauble Valley Conservation Authority. It manages close to 29,000 acres (12,000 ha) across over 200 properties.

== Conservation areas ==
- Arran Lake
- Bognor Marsh Management Area
- Bruce’s Caves Conservation Area
- Epping-John Muir Lookout Conservation Area
- Eugenia Falls Conservation Area
- Feversham Gorge
- Hepworth
- Hibou Conservation Area
- Indian Falls Conservation Area
- Inglis Falls Conservation Area
- Jones Falls & Pottawatomi Conservation Area
- Massie Hills Management Area
- Old Baldy Conservation Area
- Spirit Rock & McNeill Estate Conservation Area
- The Glen
- Trout Hollow (Bighead River)

== See also ==
- Conservation Authorities Act
- Conservation Ontario
- List of conservation authorities in Ontario
