= Niagara Peninsula Conservation Authority =

Conservation agency in Ontario, Canada

The Niagara Peninsula Conservation Authority is one of 36 conservation authorities in the Canadian province of Ontario. It was established via the Conservation Authorities Act, and is a member authority of Conservation Ontario.

The authority is responsible for the management and protection of the watershed in the Niagara Peninsula, which includes the Niagara River, Welland River, and other bodies of water flowing into Lake Erie and Lake Ontario. It covers all of the Regional Municipality of Niagara and portions of Haldimand County and the city of Hamilton.

== Conservation areas ==
The Niagara Peninsula Conservation Authority manages 41 conservation areas, including:

- Ball's Falls Conservation Area
- Beamer Memorial Conservation Area
- Binbrook Conservation Area
- Binbrook Tract (wildlife and natural heritage refuge)
- Canborough
- Cave Springs
- Chippawa Creek Conservation Area
- Comfort Maple Conservation Area
- EC Brown Conservation Area
- Gainsborough Conservation Area
- Gord Harry Trail
- Hedley Forest Conservation Area
- Humberstone Marsh Conservation Area
- Jordan Harbour Conservation Area
- Long Beach Conservation Area
- Louth Conservation Area
- Morgans Point Conservation Area
- Mountainview Conservation Area
- Mud Lake Conservation Area
- Oswego Creek Conservation Area
- Port Davidson Conservation Area
- Rockway Conservation Area
- Ruigrok Tract (wildlife and forest management area)
- Shriners Creek (wildlife refuge and stormwater management area)
- Smith Ness Conservation Area
- Saint Johns Conservation Area
- Stevensville Conservation Area
- Two Mile Creek Conservation Area
- Virgil Dams and Reservoirs Conservation Area
- Wainfleet Bog Conservation Area
- Wainfleet Wetlands Conservation Area
- Willoughby Marsh Conservation Area
- Woodend Conservation Area
- Woolverton Conservation Area
