= Ottawa River Waterway =

Coordinates: 46.03921°N 77.3289°W

Ottawa River Waterway Logo,

The Ottawa River Waterway is a series of portage bypass sites around rapids and dams along the Ottawa River, managed by the Governments of Ontario and Quebec, to allow recreational boating between Lake Timiskaming and Montreal. The Waterway officially starts in Mattawa, Ontario, but provides access all the way down to Pembroke and Ottawa.

== Bypass sites ==
The bypass sites provide hydraulic lifters and trucks for transporting boats along key portages. They are located at the following points:

- Fitzroy Harbour, Ontario
- Portage-du-Fort, Quebec and Bryson, Quebec
- Chapeau, Quebec and Desjardinsville, Quebec
- Rapides-des-Joachims, Quebec
- Mattawa, Ontario
- Témiscaming, Quebec

== See also ==
- Ottawa River
- Ottawa Valley
- Ottawa-Bonnechere Graben
- Rideau Canal
- Welland Canal
- Trent–Severn Waterway

=== Geographic topics ===
- Opeongo Hills to the west
- Laurentian Highlands to the north and east
- Laurentian Mountains to the north and east
- Parks Canada
- Parks Ontario
- Rouge Park
- St. Lawrence Parks Commission
- St. Lawrence Waterway
- Niagara Parks Commission
- National Capital Commission
- St. Clair Parks Commission
- Conservation authority
- Conservation Ontario
- Société des établissements de plein air du Québec (SEPAQ) (SEPAQ)
