= Crowe Valley Conservation Authority =

Conservation authority in Ontario, Canada

- Founded: 1958
- Region served: Crowe Valley
- Website: www.crowevalley.com

Crowe Valley Conservation Authority (CVCA), is a conservation authority established in 1958 under the Conservation Authorities Act of Ontario.

== Conservation areas ==
- The Gut Conservation Area
- McGeachie Conservation Area
- Callaghan’s Rapids Conservation Area
- Crowe Bridge Conservation Area

== See also ==
- Conservation Authorities Act
- Conservation Ontario
- List of conservation authorities in Ontario
