= Ganaraska Region Conservation Authority =

Conservation organization in Ontario, Canada

The Ganaraska Region Conservation Authority (GRCA) or Ganaraska Conservation, is a conservation authority in the Canadian province of Ontario. It was established in October 1946 via the Conservation Authorities Act, and is a member authority of Conservation Ontario.

The authority is responsible for the management and protection of the Ganaraska River watershed in Northumberland County and the Regional Municipality of Durham in Southern Ontario.

== History ==
As a result of a pilot study entitled "Ganaraska Watershed: A study in land use with recommendations for the rehabilitation of the area in the post war period” by A.H. Richardson, the Ganaraska River Conservation Authority was formed in October 1946. The report laid out the plan for managing the Ganaraska River watershed. In 1962, the Wilmot Creek, Graham Creek, and some smaller streams flowing to Lake Ontario were added, and the authority was renamed the Ganaraska Region Conservation Authority. In 1970, Gage Creek and Cobourg Creek were added to the authority's mandate, extending it to 935 square kilometres (361 sq mi) in area.

One major objective from the start of the Authority's establishment was the reforestation and acquisition of lands for flood control. The first tree was planted in May 1947. By 1991, the GRCA had planted over 4,200 hectares (10,000 acres) on land acquired from private landowners and local municipalities. In 1997, the GRCA took over management of the Ganaraska Forest, taking over from the Province of Ontario.

Flooding was one reason for the reforestation. Floods had occurred on the Ganaraska River between 1848 and 1937. In 1980, a once-per-100 year event caused flooding in Port Hope. The GRCA channelized and deepened the river through the town and a flood in Port Hope has not re-occurred.

== Conservation areas ==
Ganaraska Region Conservation Authority manages nine conservation areas:

- Ball's Mills Conservation Area
- Ganaraska Millennium Conservation Area
- Rice Lake Conservation Area
- Cobourg Conservation Area
- Garden Hill Conservation Area
- Richardson's Lookout Conservation Area
- Thurne Parks Conservation Area
- Port Hope Conservation Area
- Sylvan Glen Conservation Area
