= Cranberry Marsh =

Cranberry Marsh may refer to:

- Cranberry Marsh, Wisconsin
- Cranberry Marsh/Starratt Wildlife Management Area in British Columbia, Canada
- Cranberry Marsh in Lynde Shores Conservation Area in Ontario, Canada
