= Catfish Creek Conservation Authority =

Conservation authority in Ontario, Canada

- Founded: 1950
- Region served: Catfish Creek watershed
- Website: www.catfishcreek.ca

Catfish Creek Conservation Authority (CCCA), is a conservation authority established in 1950 under the Conservation Authorities Act of Ontario.

== Conservation areas ==
- Springwater Forest
- Archie Coulter Conservation Area
- Yarmouth Natural Heritage Area
- Calton Swamp Wetland Complex
- Hawkins Tract

== See also ==
- Conservation Authorities Act
- Conservation Ontario
- List of conservation authorities in Ontario
