= Kawartha Conservation =

Conservation authority in Ontario, Canada

- Founded: 1979
- Type: Conservation authority
- Location: Kawartha Lakes, Ontario, Canada
- Region served: Kawartha Lakes watershed
- Website: kawarthaconservation.com

Kawartha Conservation is a conservation authority in Ontario, Canada, serving the watershed of the Kawartha Lakes.

== Conservation areas ==
- Durham East Cross Forest Conservation Area
- Fleetwood Creek Natural Area
- Ken Reid Conservation Area
- Pigeon River Headwaters Conservation Area
- Windy Ridge Conservation Area

== See also ==
- Conservation Ontario
