= Lynde Creek =

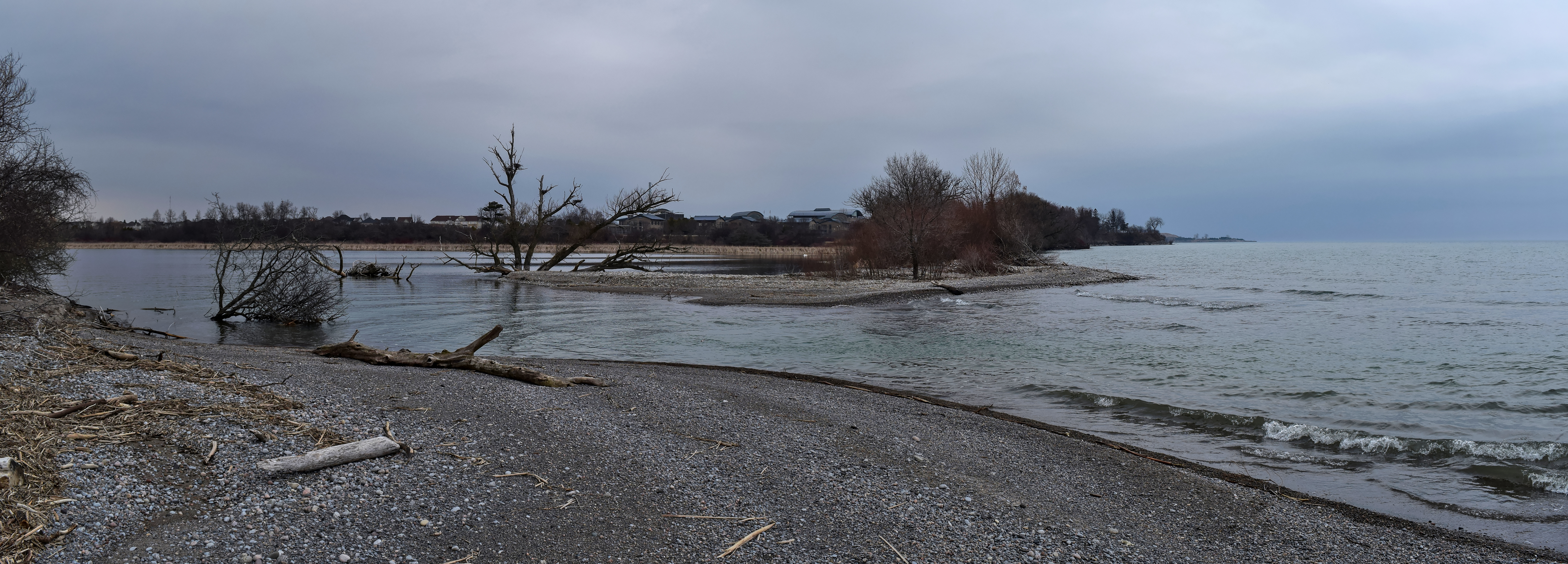
- Lynde Creek emptying into Lake Ontario

- Location of the mouth of Lynde Creek in southern Ontario

Location
- Country: Canada
- Province: Ontario
- Region: Central Ontario
- Regional Municipality: Durham
- Municipalities: Whitby; Scugog

Physical characteristics
- Source: Chalk Lake
  - location: Scugog
  - coordinates: 44°01′18″N 79°02′17″W
  - elevation: 287 m (942 ft)
- Mouth: Lake Ontario
  - location: Whitby
  - coordinates: 43°50′43″N 78°57′09″W
  - elevation: 74 m (243 ft)
- Basin size: 132.19 km^{2} (51.04 sq mi)

Basin features
- River system: Great Lakes Basin

Lynde Creek is a stream in the municipalities of Whitby and Scugog, Regional Municipality of Durham, in the Greater Toronto Area of Ontario, Canada. It is in the Great Lakes Basin, is a tributary of Lake Ontario, and is under the auspices of the Central Lake Ontario Conservation Authority. The creek begins on the Oak Ridges Moraine in geographic Reach Township in the municipality of Scugog, and flows south to its mouth in the southwest of the town of Whitby. Portions of the 132.19-square-kilometre (51.04 sq mi) watershed also extend into the town of Ajax, the city of Pickering and the municipality of Uxbridge.
