= Otonabee Region Conservation Authority =

Conservation authority in Ontario, Canada

- Founded: 1959
- Type: Conservation authority
- Website: www.otonabeeconservation.com

The Otonabee Region Conservation Authority (ORCA), sometimes shortened to Otonabee Conservation, is a conservation authority in Ontario, Canada. Established in 1959 and based in Peterborough, its member municipalities include Asphodel-Norwood, Cavan Monaghan, Douro-Dummer, City of Kawartha Lakes, Otonabee–South Monaghan, City of Peterborough, Selwyn, and Trent Hills. Major watercourses within the watershed administered by ORCA include the Otonabee, Indian, and Ouse rivers, and Baxter, Cavan, Jackson, Miller and Squirrel creeks.

== Conservation Areas ==
- Hope Mill
- Imagine the Marsh
- Jackson Creek Kiwanis Trail
- Miller Creek Wildlife Area
- Selwyn Beach Conservation Area
- Squirrel Creek Otonabee-South Monaghan manages Squirrel Creek under an agreement with ORCA.
- Warsaw Caves Conservation Area and Campground

In addition to the listed Conservation Areas, ORCA operates the campground area of Beavermead Park under agreement with the City of Peterborough.

- Beavermead Campground
