= Lynde Shores Conservation Area =

Protected area in Whitby, Ontario, Canada

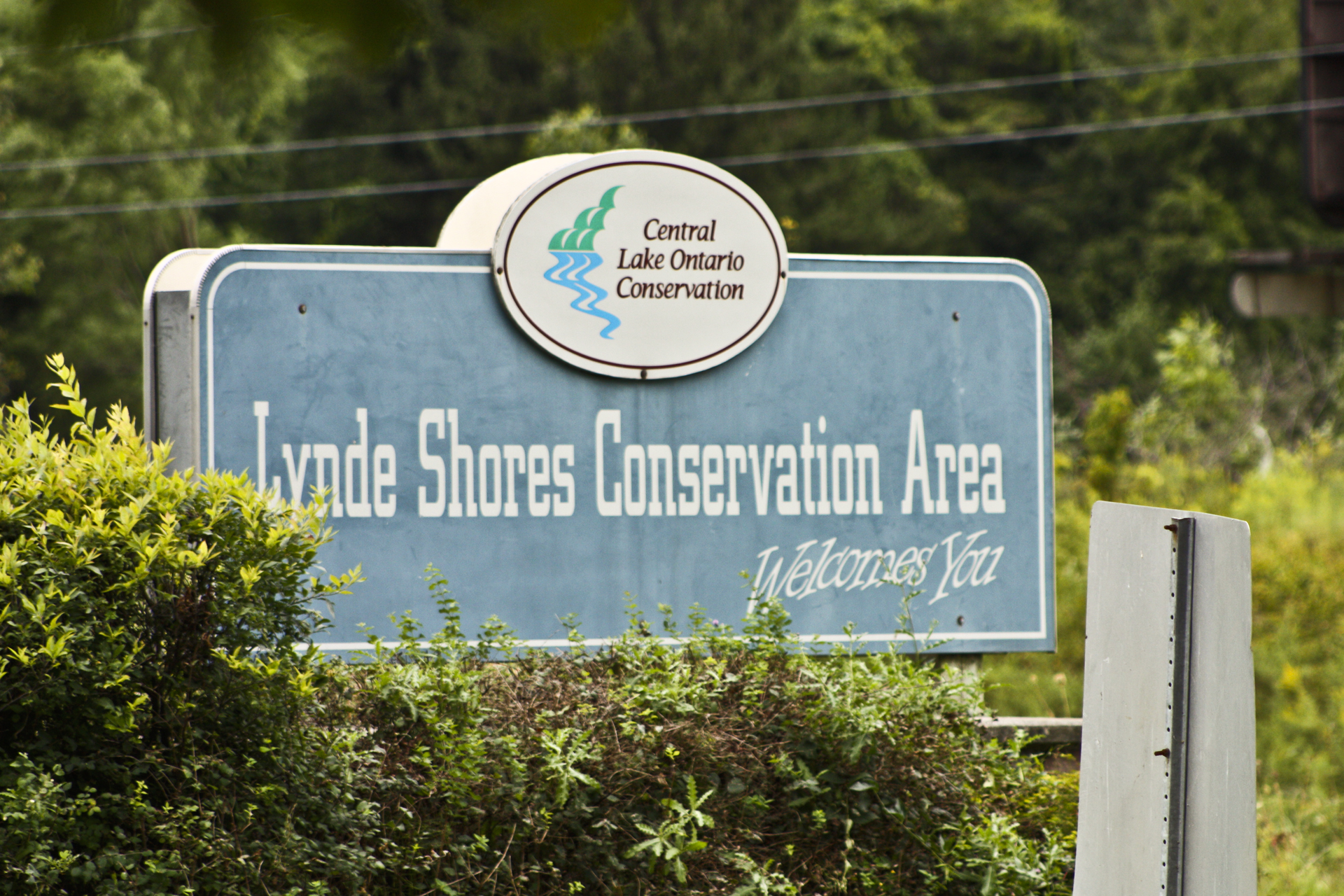
- Public entrance to Lynde Shores
- Interactive map of Lynde Shores Conservation Area
- Location: 1225 Victoria St W Whitby, Ontario, Canada; L1P 2B7
- Coordinates: 43°50′55″N 78°57′29″W
- Area: 272 ha (670 acres)
- Established: 1972
- Governing body: Central Lake Ontario Conservation Authority

Lynde Shores Conservation Area is a protected area located in Whitby, Ontario, Canada. Located on the northern shore of Lake Ontario, the conservation area composes the mouth of Lynde Creek and its surrounding marshlands, including Cranberry Marsh. The area is operated by the Central Lake Ontario Conservation Authority.

== Landform and vegetation ==
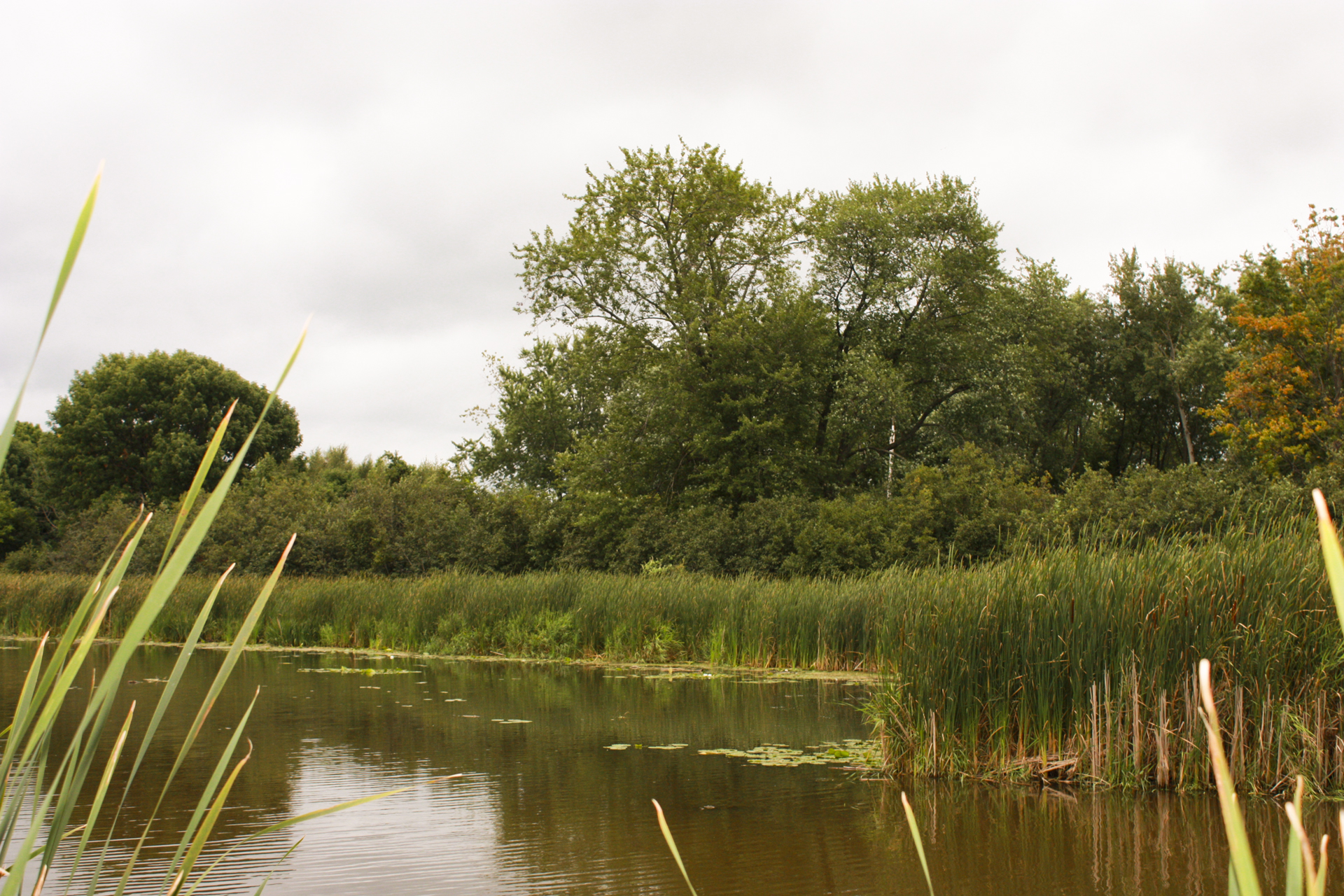
Marshlands in Lynde Shores in May 2013

Lynde Shores Conservation Area is located on the former lake bed of Lake Iroquois, a historic glacial lake whose meltwater formed what is presently Lake Ontario. The area is relatively flat and composed primarily of clay soil, allowing Lynde Creek to meander freely as it flows into Lake Ontario. The flatness of the land and cohesiveness of the soil prevents the earth from being eroded by the creek in small pieces; the area instead erodes in large sediments, creating a steep walled valley.

The Ontario Ministry of Natural Resources designates four primary areas in Lynde Shores: marshland, lakeshore, open field, and woodlots. The marshland is a habitat for multiple species of reptiles, amphibians, fish, and waterfowl, though its proximity to Durham Regional Road 22 makes the faunal diversity of the area lower than that of other lakeshore marshes in the province. Nonetheless, the area provides an important resting point for shorebirds and waterfowl migrating along Lake Ontario. The lakeshore is composed of a barrier beach of sand and gravel of approximately 6 to 9 metres (20 to 30 feet) in width. The open field was formerly used as recreational land for cottages and commercially as farmland, while two woodlots sit on the site: one to the immediate west of the area's access road, and one in the extreme southeast portion of the area.

== History ==
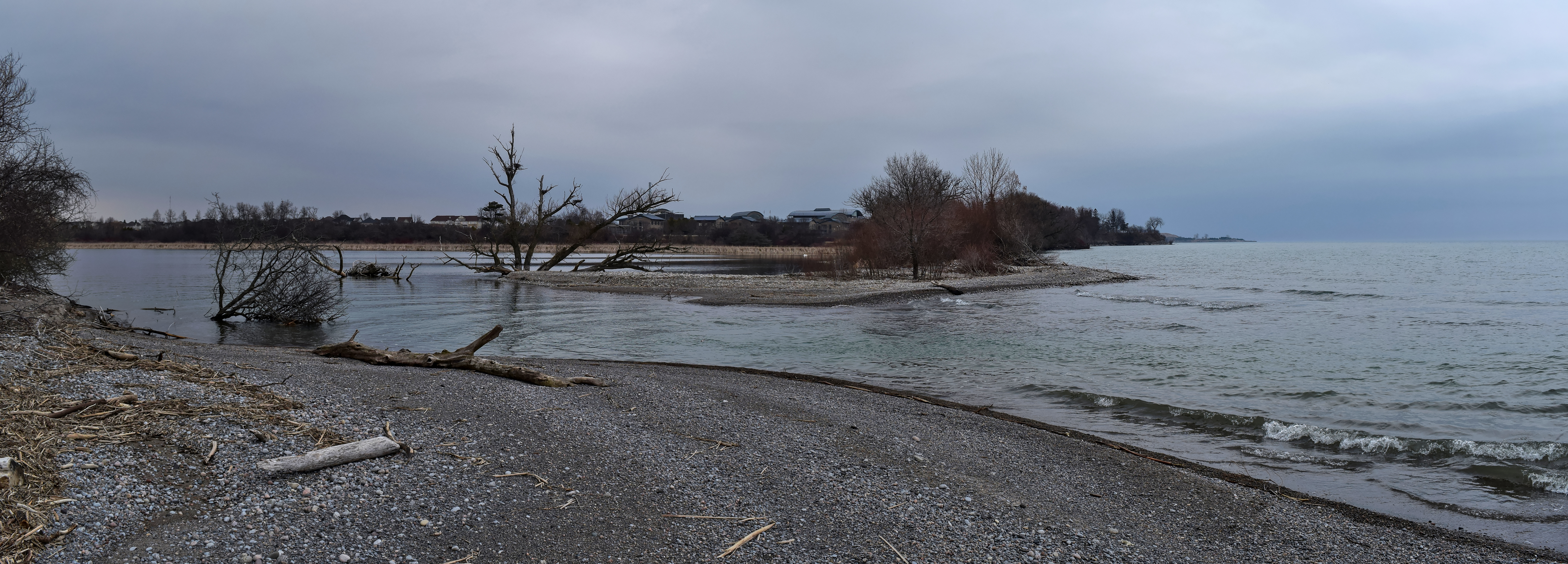

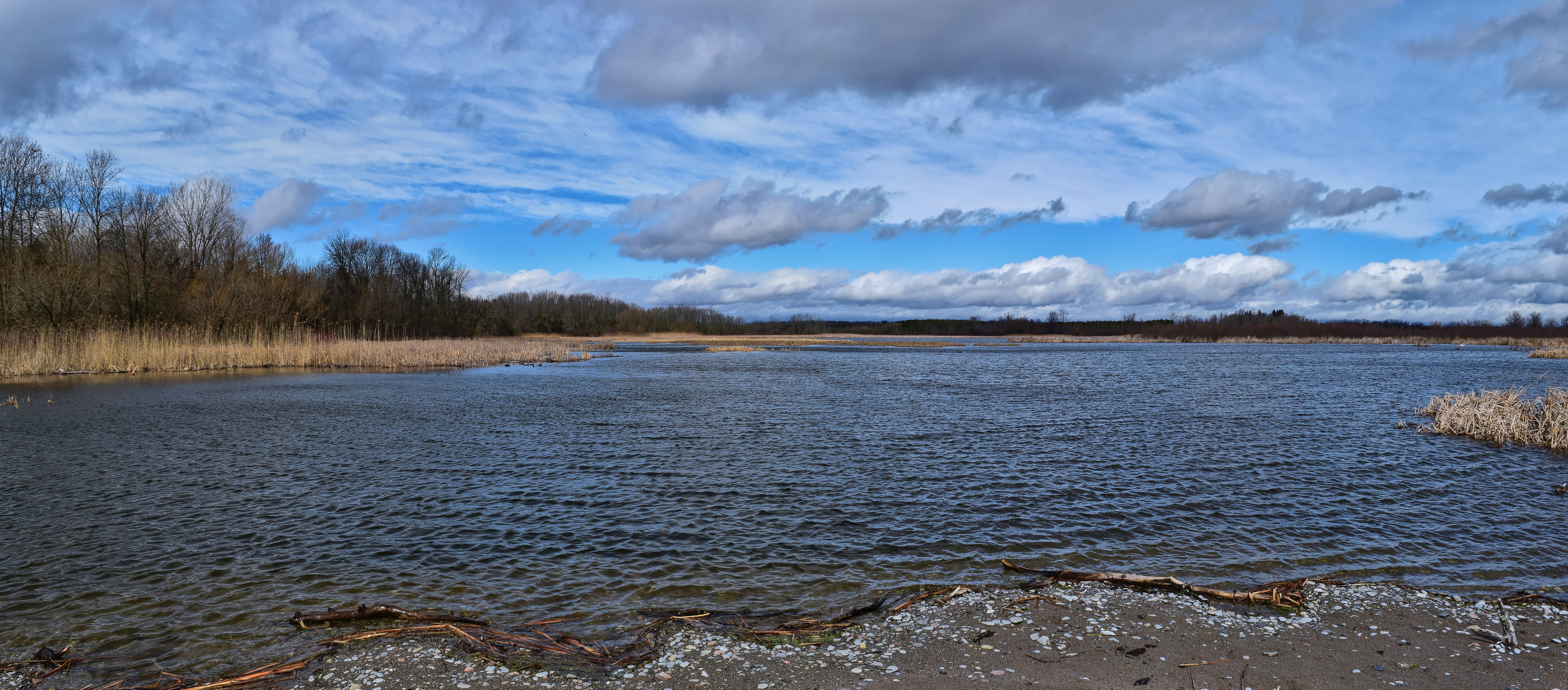
Panoramas of the mouth of Lynde Creek (top) and Cranberry Marsh (bottom)

Lynde Shores Conservation Area was established in 1972 as a 272 ha (670-acre) protected area composing the environs surrounding the mouth of Lynde Creek and Cranberry Marsh. It is one of the few remaining coastal wetlands along this northern section of Lake Ontario; the area has been designated as provincially significant, and is the subject of a long-term watershed management study. The area is open to the public for fishing, canoeing, and hiking, and attracts roughly 50,000 visitors per year. It contains 5 kilometres (3.1 miles) of hikeable trails, including a portion of the Great Lakes Waterfront Trail. A boardwalk was built in 1990, but was demolished after being deemed structurally unsafe.

The area became a destination for cruising as early as the 2000s, prompting multiple sting operations by the Durham Regional Police Service (DRPS). On August 29, 2011, seven men in Lynde Shores were arrested for "committing indecent acts" and eleven others were ticketed for trespassing on private property. In stings conducted in 2012 from August 12 to 18, twenty five men were arrested in Lynde Shores on trespassing charges. In June 2014, four men were charged with committing an indecent act in Lynde Shores.

On July 11, 2013, two men were arrested for maintaining an illegal marijuana grow-op in Lynde Shores. In their investigation, DRPS discovered 175 marijuana plants with an estimated value of CAD$175,000.

== See also ==
- Heber Down Conservation Area
