= Conservation authority (Ontario) =

Natural resource management agency in Ontario, Canada

A conservation authority is a local, community-based natural resource management agency based in Ontario, Canada. Conservation authorities represent groupings of municipalities on a watershed basis and work in partnership with other agencies to carry out natural resource management activities within their respective watersheds, on behalf of their member municipalities and the Province of Ontario.

The 1946 Conservation Authorities Act provides the means by which municipalities within a common watershed can petition the Province of Ontario to form a conservation authority for that watershed to undertake programs of natural resource management. Conservation authorities are established as corporate bodies under the Act. There are currently 36 conservation authorities in Ontario. On November 7, 2025, the Doug Ford Conservative government opened a listing on the Environmental Registry proposing the regional consolidation of the 36 Conservation Authorities into seven.

Conservation authorities are mandated to develop programs to further the conservation, restoration, development and management of Ontario's natural resources. They carry out programs in natural hazard management on behalf of the province and municipalities, and may also carry out other programs that serve municipal interests, such as nature education, land conservation and management, recreation programs, and research. Management programs generally occur in lands known as conservation areas, restoration areas or wilderness areas, though not all lands managed are necessarily designated as such.

Conservation authorities' primary responsibilities are in natural hazard management and environmental protection. While all conservation authorities carry out natural hazard management programs, their roles in environmental protection vary significantly because these are determined by local municipalities.

== Structure ==
Each conservation authority is governed by a board of directors made up of representatives from its member municipalities. The number of representatives each municipality can have is determined by the Conservation Authorities Act based on its population within the watershed. Board members act on behalf of the municipalities they represent. Boards collectively determine the direction of authorities including the programs they will carry out and operational decisions throughout the year. For most matters, each member is entitled to one vote, and decisions are made by majority vote. For voting on non-matching levies (levies against municipalities which are not matched by the Province), voting is done using a weighted vote, where each municipality has the same share of the vote as the share of the budget that it pays, except that no municipality can have more than 50% of the vote. If a municipality pays more than 50% of the budget, its share of the vote is capped at 50% and the shares of other municipalities are increased proportionately.

Conservation authorities are administered by a General Manager or Chief Administrative Officer who reports to the Board.

== Funding ==
Conservation authorities' funding comes from a variety of sources. Conservation authorities have the power to generate revenue through fees and other self-generated revenue, and also the power to levy their member municipalities. As registered charities, they are eligible for certain government grants. Under Section 39 of the Conservation Authorities Act, the Province may also provide grants to conservation authorities.

Historically, conservation authorities' funding was split evenly between the Province and member municipalities. In the mid-1990s, under the Red Tape Reduction Act of the Progressive Conservative government, conservation authorities' provincial funding was drastically reduced from more than CA$50 million annually divided among all the authorities to $8 million, and the Province reduced the scope of its support to natural hazard management programs and programs for protecting provincially significant conservation land, although the $8 million in funding was exclusively for natural hazard management. Other programs were considered to be only in the local interest and the Province stated that those programs could be funded by municipalities if the municipalities wished them to continue. At the same time, the government provided conservation authorities with new powers to charge fees and generate revenue. As a result, most conservation authorities became more entrepreneurial to generate the revenue needed to continue their local programming. Funding was further cut by 5% to $7.6 million in 2000. In 2012, under the Liberal government, funding was cut again by 2% to $7.448 million, and in 2019, under the Progressive Conservative government, it was cut again by 48% to $3.58 million.

The Province also provides funding to conservation authorities for the implementation of the Clean Water Act, brought in as a result of the inquiry into the E. coli outbreak in Walkerton in 2000 which resulted in six deaths, which is meant to identify threats to and protect drinking water sources.

Annual budgets are determined by the board of directors. The portion to be funded by municipal levy (payment by member municipalities) is divided among the participating municipalities according to a formula set out in Ontario Regulation 670/00 which is based on the total value of all lands within each municipality, multiplied by modifiers in the regulation and by the proportion of the municipality which falls within the authority's jurisdiction, as a proportion of the total modified value within the authority's jurisdiction. For example, if 30% of a municipality's area falls within an authority's jurisdiction, and the total value of land in that municipality after applying modifiers is 10 million dollars, 3 million dollars is the value used to calculated the municipality's share of the levy (30% x 10 million). If the total value in the jurisdiction, after adding together all such values for all the participating municipalities, is 20 million dollars, the municipality's share of the levy is 15% (3 million divided by 20 million).

In 2013, municipal levies accounted for approximately 48% of all conservation authorities' revenue; self-generated revenue accounted for 40%; provincial funding, including the natural hazards management funding as well as Clean Water Act funding and various other grants for special projects, accounted for 10%; and federal funding, for special projects and Areas of Concern, 2%.

== Role in natural hazard management ==
Each conservation authority has a Regulation of Development, Interference with Wetlands and Alterations to Shorelines and Watercourses under the Conservation Authorities Act which conforms to a provincial template regulation.

Under these regulations, conservation authorities regulate development and other activities in and near natural hazard areas such as shorelines, floodplains, unstable slopes, wetlands, and other hazardous lands, such as karst topography and Leda clay. Development is prohibited in areas designated by the regulation unless permission is granted by the conservation authority. Landowners or developers may need permits from a conservation authority, similar to a building permit, to do work such as constructing buildings or placing fill in these areas. These regulations were put in place after the devastating impacts of Hurricane Hazel in 1954.

Conservation authorities also do flood forecasting and warning, flood and erosion control, ice management and drought programs, and contribute to municipal land use planning.

== Role in environmental protection ==
Conservation authorities may have programs to protect local ecosystems and contribute to the quality of life in communities throughout the province. Some of the activities conservation authorities may include:

- Water resource management – Conservation authorities carry out research and activities to manage Ontario's water resources on a watershed basis, maintain secure supplies of clean water, and contribute to municipal planning processes.
- Integrated water resource management (IWRM) is an ecosystem approach in which at least: (1) the catchment or river basin rather than an administrative or political unit is the management unit; (2) attention is directed to upstream–downstream, surface–groundwater and water quantity–quality interactions; (3) interconnections of water with other natural resources and the environment are considered; (4) environmental, economic and social aspects receive attention; and (5) stakeholders are actively engaged in planning, management and implementation to achieve an explicit vision, objectives and outcomes.
- Stewardship – conservation authorities collectively own about 146,000 hectares of land in Ontario. They also may work with landowners to plant trees or make other environmental improvements to private property, such as helping farmers improve drainage systems.
- Recreation – conservation authorities own over 400 conservation areas for public use, with 8,400 campsites and almost 2,500 kilometers of trails.
- Science, data collection and monitoring – conservation authorities may collect a variety of information about their watersheds, including about water quality, land use, and types of lands (e.g., amount of wetlands and forest cover).
- Education – through school programs, at conservation authority facilities, and through participation at local events and festivals

== List of conservation authorities ==
Conservation Ontario is the umbrella organization for all 36 regional Conservation Authorities in the Province of Ontario:

- Ausable Bayfield Conservation Authority
- Cataraqui Region Conservation Authority
- Catfish Creek Conservation Authority
- Central Lake Ontario Conservation Authority
- Conservation Halton
- Conservation Sudbury
- Credit Valley Conservation
- Crowe Valley Conservation Authority
- Essex Region Conservation Authority
- Ganaraska Region Conservation Authority
- Grand River Conservation Authority
- Grey Sauble Conservation Authority
- Hamilton Conservation Authority
- Kawartha Conservation
- Kettle Creek Conservation Authority
- Lake Simcoe Region Conservation Authority
- Lakehead Region Conservation Authority
- Long Point Region Conservation Authority
- Lower Thames Valley Conservation Authority
- Lower Trent Conservation
- Maitland Valley Conservation Authority
- Mattagami Region Conservation Authority
- Mississippi Valley Conservation
- Niagara Peninsula Conservation Authority
- North Bay-Mattawa Conservation Authority
- Nottawasaga Valley Conservation Authority
- Otonabee Region Conservation Authority
- Quinte Conservation
- Raisin Region Conservation Authority
- Rideau Valley Conservation Authority
- Saugeen Valley Conservation Authority
- Sault Ste. Marie Region Conservation Authority
- South Nation Conservation
- St. Clair Region Conservation Authority
- Toronto and Region Conservation Authority
- Upper Thames River Conservation Authority
