= Conservation Sudbury =

Canadian local government body

- Formation: 1973
- Type: Conservation authority
- Purpose: Natural resources conservation and management
- Headquarters: 401-199 Larch Street; Sudbury, Ontario; P3E 5P9
- Region served: Greater Sudbury
- Chair: Steve Kaufman
- Website: conservationsudbury.ca
- Formerly called: Nickel District Conservation Authority

Conservation Sudbury, formerly known as the Nickel District Conservation Authority (French: L’Office de protection de la nature du district de Nickel), is a conservation authority in northern Ontario, Canada. Conservation Sudbury manages approximately 7,580 square kilometres within the watersheds of the Vermilion, Wanapitei and Whitefish rivers, as well as the Lake Laurentian Conservation Area.

== History ==
The Nickel District Conservation Authority was created in 1973 with the merger of the Junction Creek Conservation Authority and the Whitson Valley Conservation Authority. In 2012, Authority was renamed to Conservation Sudbury.

== Lake Laurentian Conservation Area ==
The Lake Laurentian Conservation Area is a conservation area in the Ramsey Lake sub-watershed, and is based around the man-made Lake Laurentian. It was established in 1967 by the Junction Creek Conservation Authority.

== See also ==
- Conservation Authorities Act
- Lake Laurentian Conservation Area
- List of conservation authorities in Ontario
