= Stephen's Gulch Conservation Area =

Protected area in Ontario, Canada

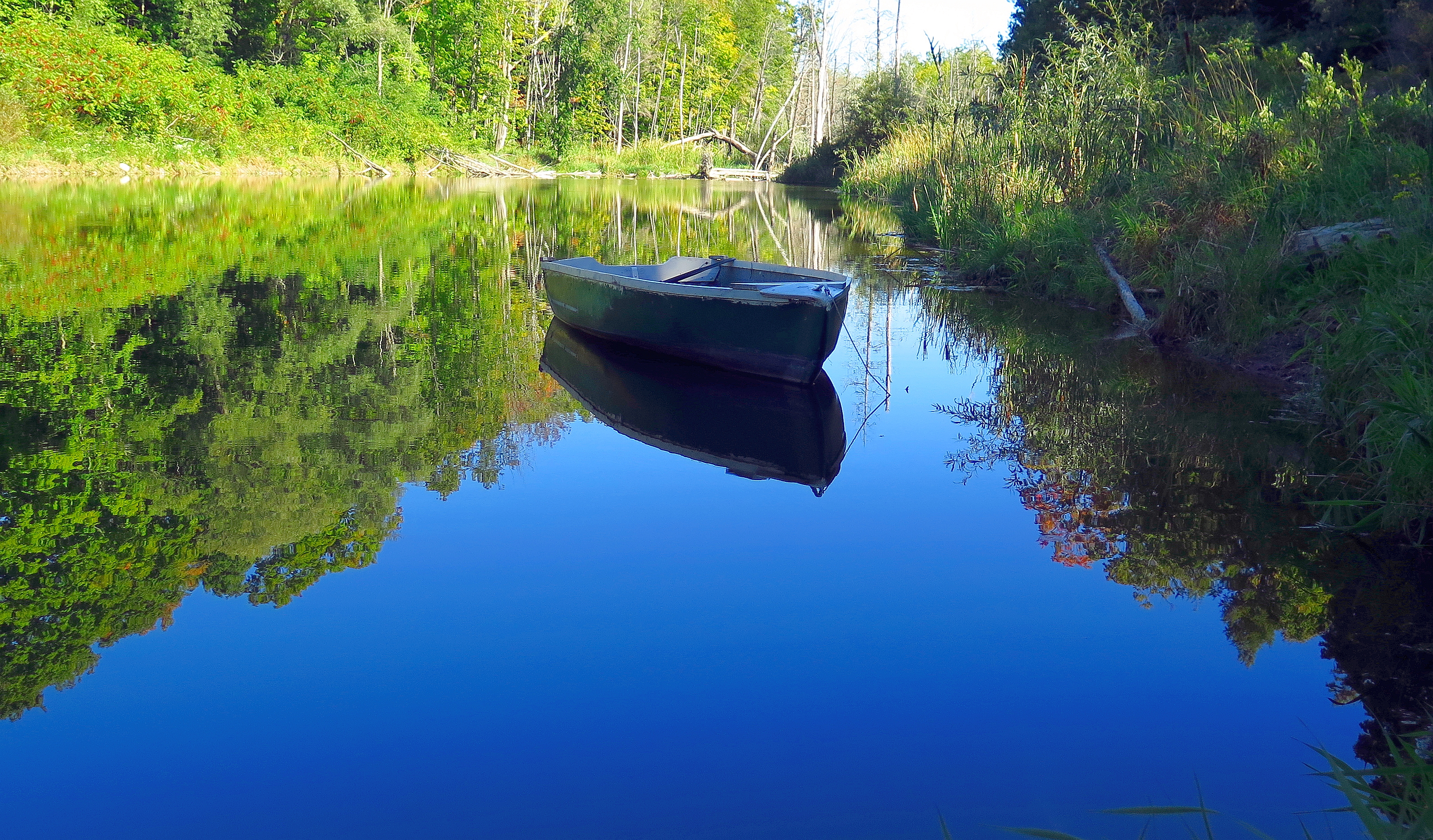
- Interactive map of Stephen's Gulch Conservation Area
- Location: Clarington, Ontario, Canada
- Coordinates: 43°57′58″N 78°40′43″W
- Area: 354 acres (143 ha)
- Governing body: Central Lake Ontario Conservation Authority

Stephen's Gulch is a conservation area located in the municipality of Clarington, Ontario, Canada. The conservation area borders a large section of the Soper Creek, and contains 354 acres (143 ha) of deciduous forests as well as coniferous forests and swamps. The conservation area is also an important watershed area for Ontario.

== History ==
=== Administration and management ===
The Stephen's Gulch conservation area is under the administration of the Central Lake Ontario Conservation Authority who are responsible for a variety of watershed services as well as upkeep of Stephen's Gulch.

== Climate ==
Stephen's Gulch has a humid continental climate with long, cold winters and hot summers. During winters temperatures can drop below −10 °C (14 °F) and can exceed 20 °C (68 °F) during summers. Rainfall averages 1,093 mm (43.0 in) per year, with late summer/early fall being the wettest months and winter the driest.

Stephens Gulch

Climate chart (precipitation, max. and min. temperature)
J	F	M	A	M	J	J	A	S	O	N	D
91 −8 −13	85 −6 −12	38 2 −6	113 14 −2	77 19 5	122 26 12	107 24 15	82 24 15	113 21 11	133 12 4	53 6 −2	79 −5 −9
- █ Average max. and min. temperatures in °C
- █ Precipitation totals in mm
Imperial conversion
J	F	M	A	M	J	J	A	S	O	N	D
3.6 18 9	3.3 21 10	1.5 36 21	4.4 57 28	3 66 41	4.8 79 54	4.2 75 59	3.2 75 59	4.4 70 52	5.2 54 39	2.1 43 28	3.1 23 16
- █ Average max. and min. temperatures in °F
- █ Precipitation totals in inches

== Geology and soils ==
Stephen's Gulch is mostly underlain by the Precambrian-era metamorphic and igneous rock of the Canadian Shield. Soils in the conservation area are mostly fine and high-quality, and average high levels of infiltration.

== Flora and fauna ==
There are a wide variety of animals that live in Stephen's Gulch, including 46 species of birds and 13 species of mammals. Animals that inhabit Stephen's Gulch include white-tailed deer, red foxes, black-capped chickadees, and pileated woodpeckers.

Old growth balsam firs, black pines, and white ash are common in the conservation area.
