= Heber Down Conservation Area =

Protected area in Ontario, Canada

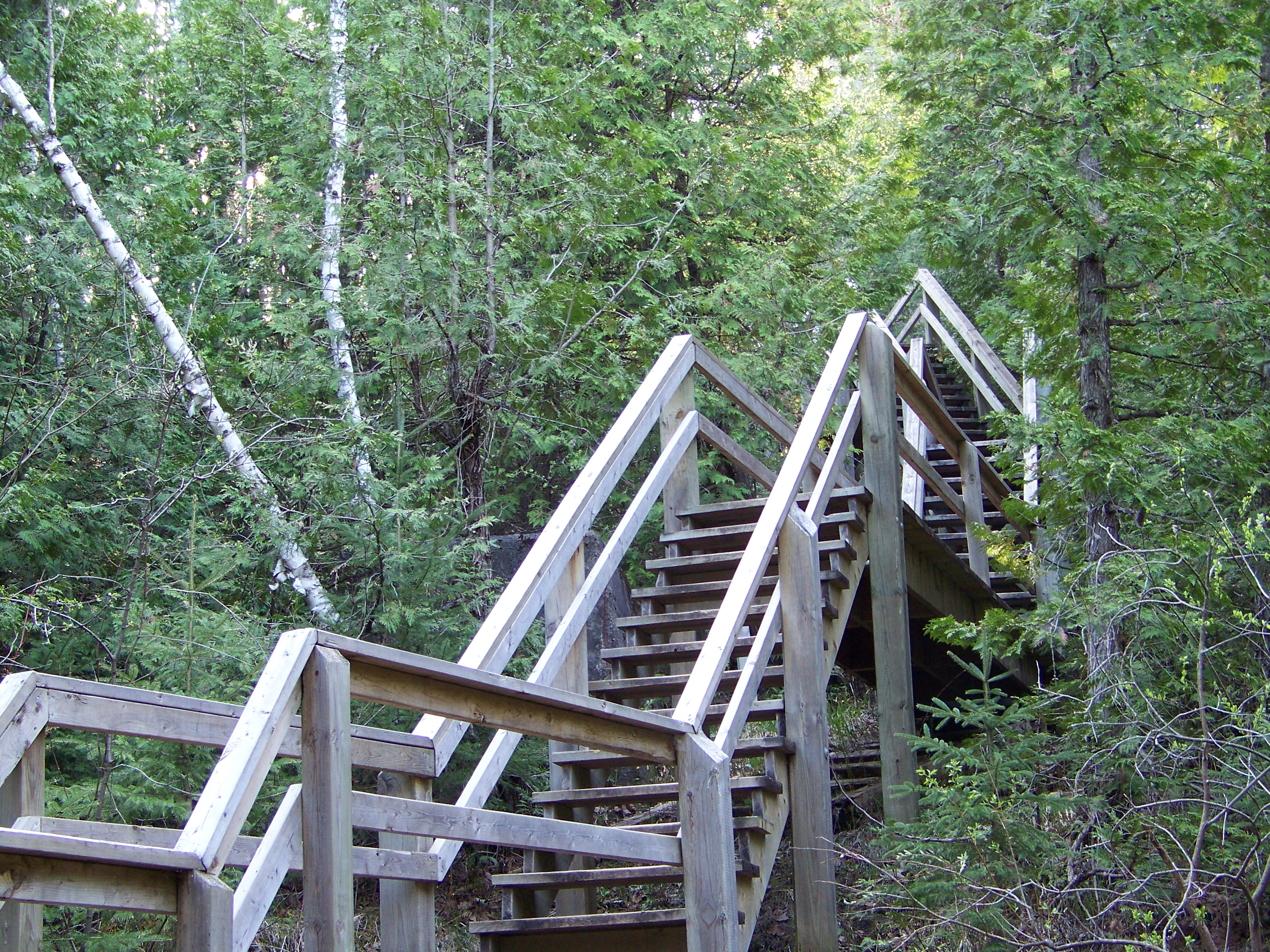
- A stairway descending into Devil's Den gully.
- Interactive map of Heber Down Conservation Area
- Location: Canada
- Nearest city: Whitby, Ontario
- Coordinates: 43°56′3″N 78°58′56″W
- Area: 284 ha (700 acres)
- Governing body: Central Lake Ontario Conservation Authority

Heber Down Conservation Area is located in Whitby, Ontario and is owned and operated by Central Lake Ontario Conservation Authority. It is located within the Lynde Creek drainage basin; it is a part of the provincially significant Heber Down Wetland Complex. The area is composed of two types of broad terrain units: a valley formed by the creek and the Glacial Lake Iroquois beach. The area provides such recreational activities as hiking, mountain biking, picnicking, and fishing.

== Landform and vegetation ==
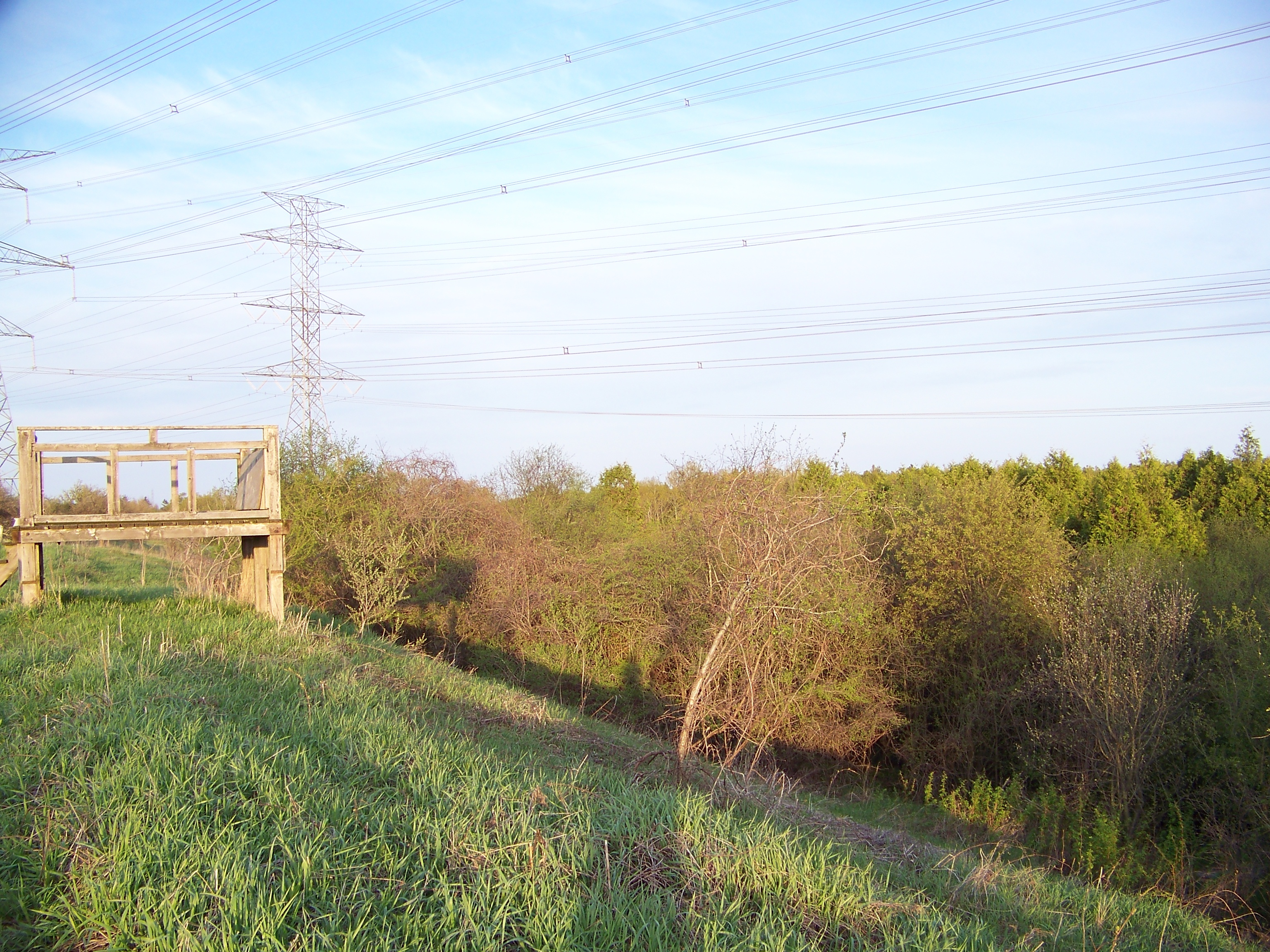
An observation platform on the Glacial Lake Iroquois beach.

The sandy and gravelly Glacial Lake Iroquois beach is a remnant of the Wisconsin glaciation. It was deposited by Lake Iroquois, the precursor to Lake Ontario, about 12,500 year ago. As the lake was shrinking, a line of beach deposits was receding as well, resulting in deposition of sand over the layers of silt and clay that were deposited when the lake was deeper. Following the final recession of the lake, the exposed sand layers were soaked by rainfall. Due to impervious layers underneath, high water table resulted in formation of large areas of swamps and marshes. Eastern parts of the conservation area are occupied by treed swamps and thicket swamps under the power transmission lines, where trees were removed.

The western portions of the area are characterized by the steeply incised valley of the Lynde Creek. At places where it cuts across the sandy Lake Iroquois beach, groundwater seeps occur, providing an ecological niche for plants growing on the valley's walls.

== Cultural history ==
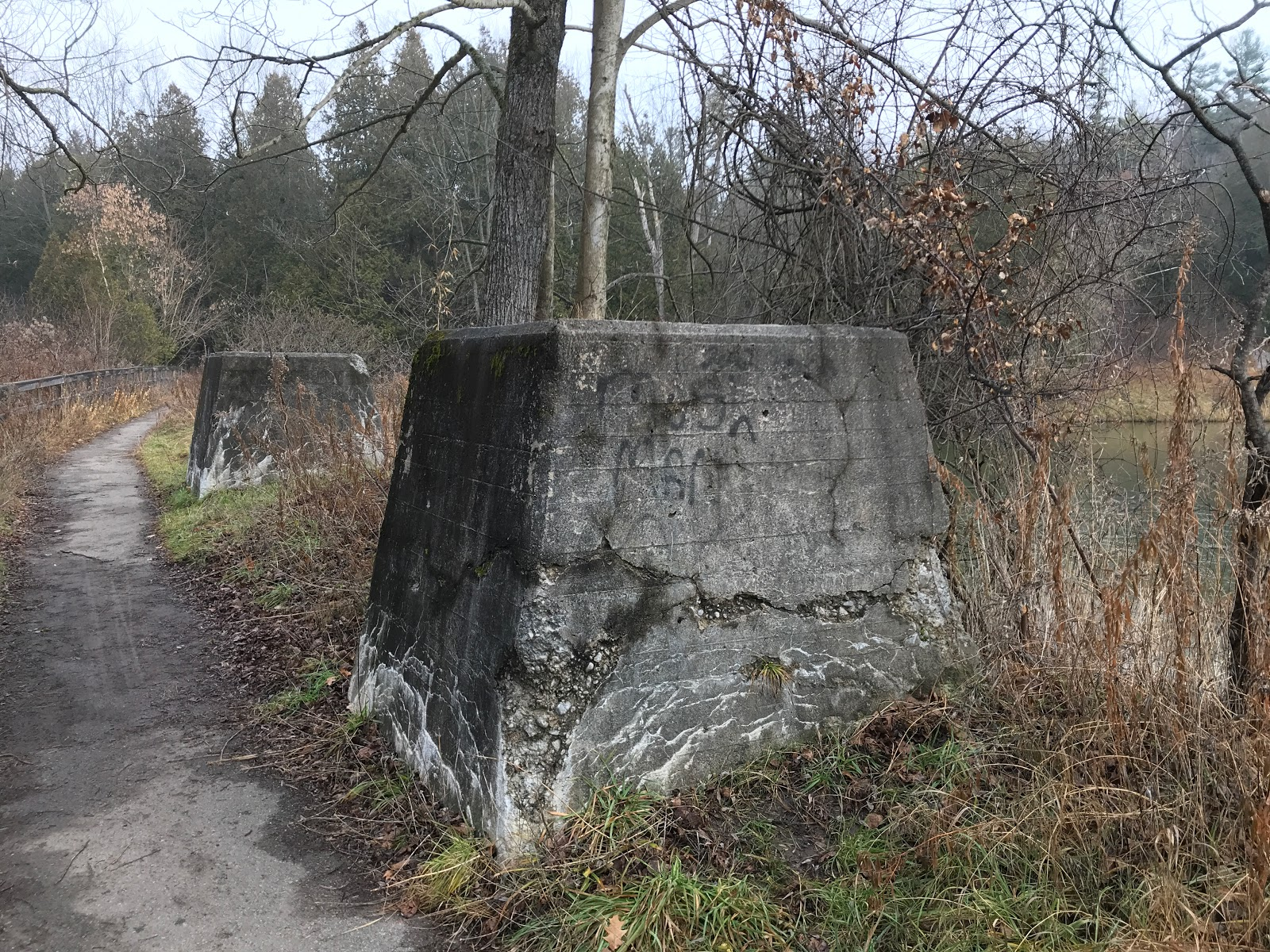
Abandoned railway bridge abutment along Devil's Den Trail.

In the late 19th and early 20th century, a deep gully, incising the area, was used by horse thieves as a layover. Local inhabitants interpreted the noises produced by the thieves and horses in a superstitious way: they assumed that the Devil was holding court there. Hence, the gully was named Devil's Den.

During the 1910s, the Canadian Northern Railway constructed a new line to provide passenger service from Toronto to Trenton. A bridge over the Devil's Den was completed in March 1910. While the bridge itself has been demolished, remains of cement abutments and piers that served as a foundation of the bridge can still be found in the area.

== See also ==
- Lynde Shores Conservation Area
