= Beamer Memorial Conservation Area =

Conservation area in Ontario, Canada

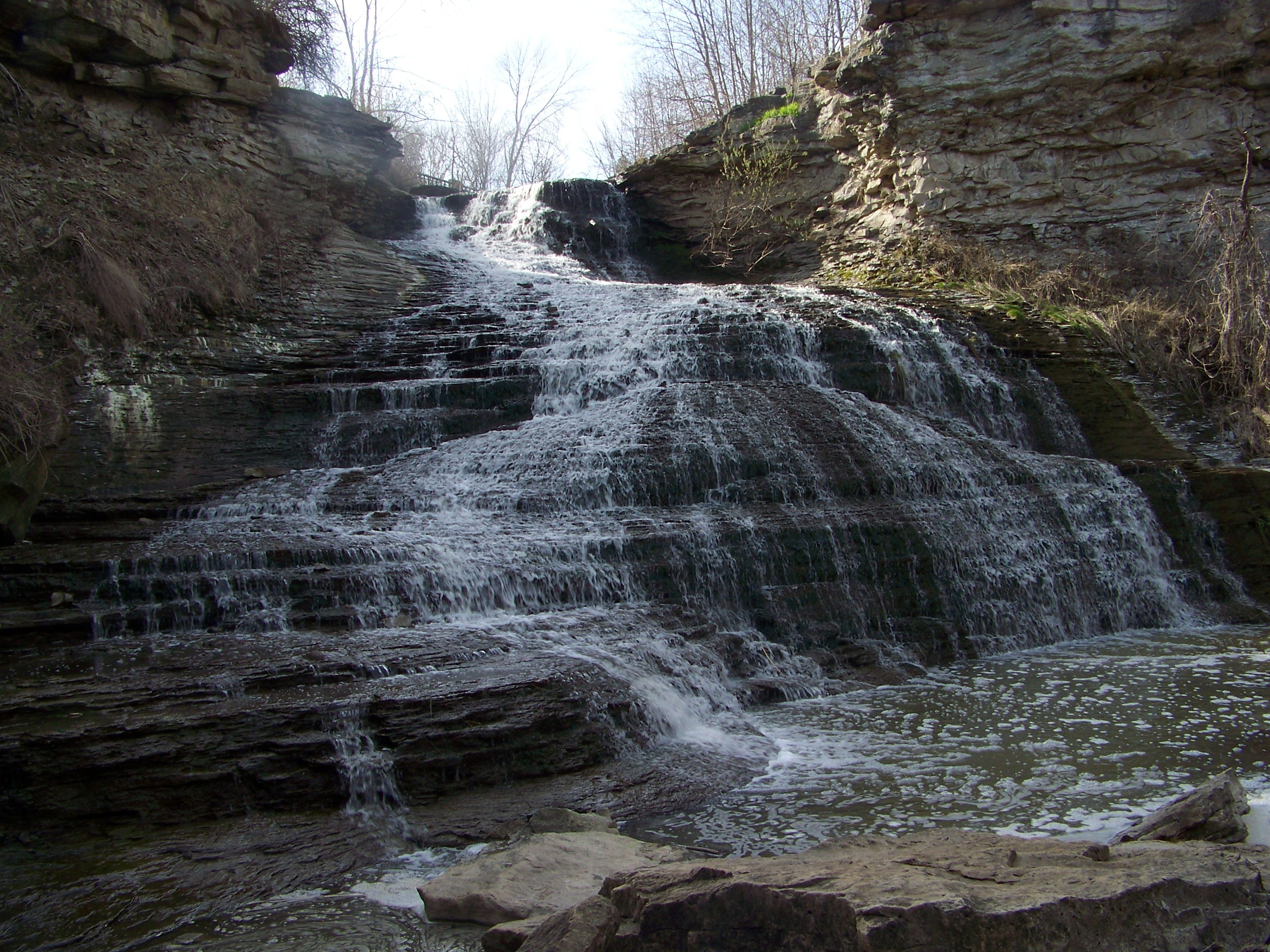
- Upper Beamer Falls
- Interactive map of Beamer Memorial Conservation Area
- Location: Grimsby, Ontario, Canada
- Coordinates: 43°11′21″N 79°34′12″W
- Area: 53 ha (130 acres)
- Governing body: Niagara Peninsula Conservation Authority

Beamer Memorial Conservation Area is located on the Niagara Escarpment in Grimsby, Ontario, Canada, and is owned and operated by the Niagara Peninsula Conservation Authority. It is noted for being the best location on the Niagara Peninsula to observe the annual spring migration of raptors.

== Landform ==
The cliffs of the Niagara Escarpment, the rolling terrain of the Vinemount Moraine and the deeply incised gorge of the Forty Mile Creek are the most prominent topographic features of the area.
