= Kettle Creek Conservation Authority =

Conservation authority in Ontario, Canada

Central Kettle Creek Conservation Authority
- Founded: 1965
- Region served: Kettle Creek watershed
- Website: www.kettlecreekconservation.on.ca

Central Kettle Creek Conservation Authority (KCCA), is a conservation authority established in 1965 under the Conservation Authorities Act of Ontario.

== Member municipalities ==
- City of London
- City of St. Thomas
- Municipality of Central Elgin
- Township of Southwold
- Township of Malahide
- Municipality of Thames Centre
- Municipality of Middlesex

== Conservation areas ==
- Dalewood Conservation Area
- Lake Whittaker Conservation Area
- Dan Patterson Conservation Area
- Kirk-Cousins Management Area
- Deer Ridge Conservation Area
- Confederation Park

== See also ==
- Conservation Authorities Act
- List of conservation authorities in Ontario
