= Lake Laurentian Conservation Area =

Protected area in Ontario, Canada

- Zone de conservation du lac Laurentien (French)
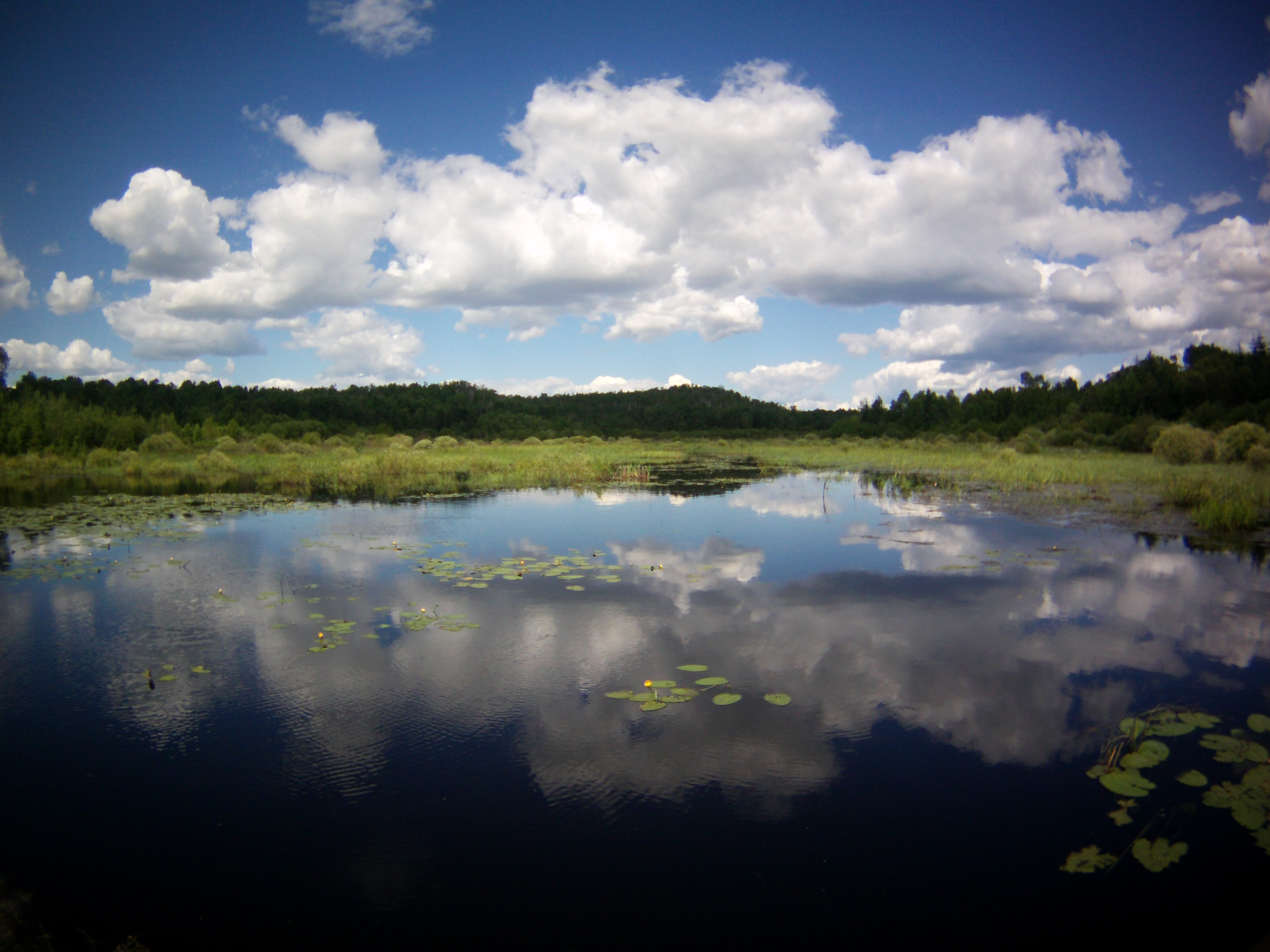
- Interactive map of Lake Laurentian Conservation Area
- Location: Greater Sudbury, Ontario
- Area: 2,400 acres (970 ha)
- Established: 1967
- Governing body: Conservation Sudbury
- Website: conservationsudbury.ca

The Lake Laurentian Conservation Area (French: Zone de conservation du lac Laurentien) is a conservation area in the Ramsey Lake sub-watershed of Greater Sudbury, Ontario, and is based around the man-made Lake Laurentian. The lake began to form in the 1950s, due to the construction of dams at the outlet of what was then a smaller lake called Mud Lake.

The conservation area was established in 1967 by the Junction Creek Conservation Authority, now part of Conservation Sudbury. The conservation area supports numerous recreational activities, including an extensive trail network.

== History ==
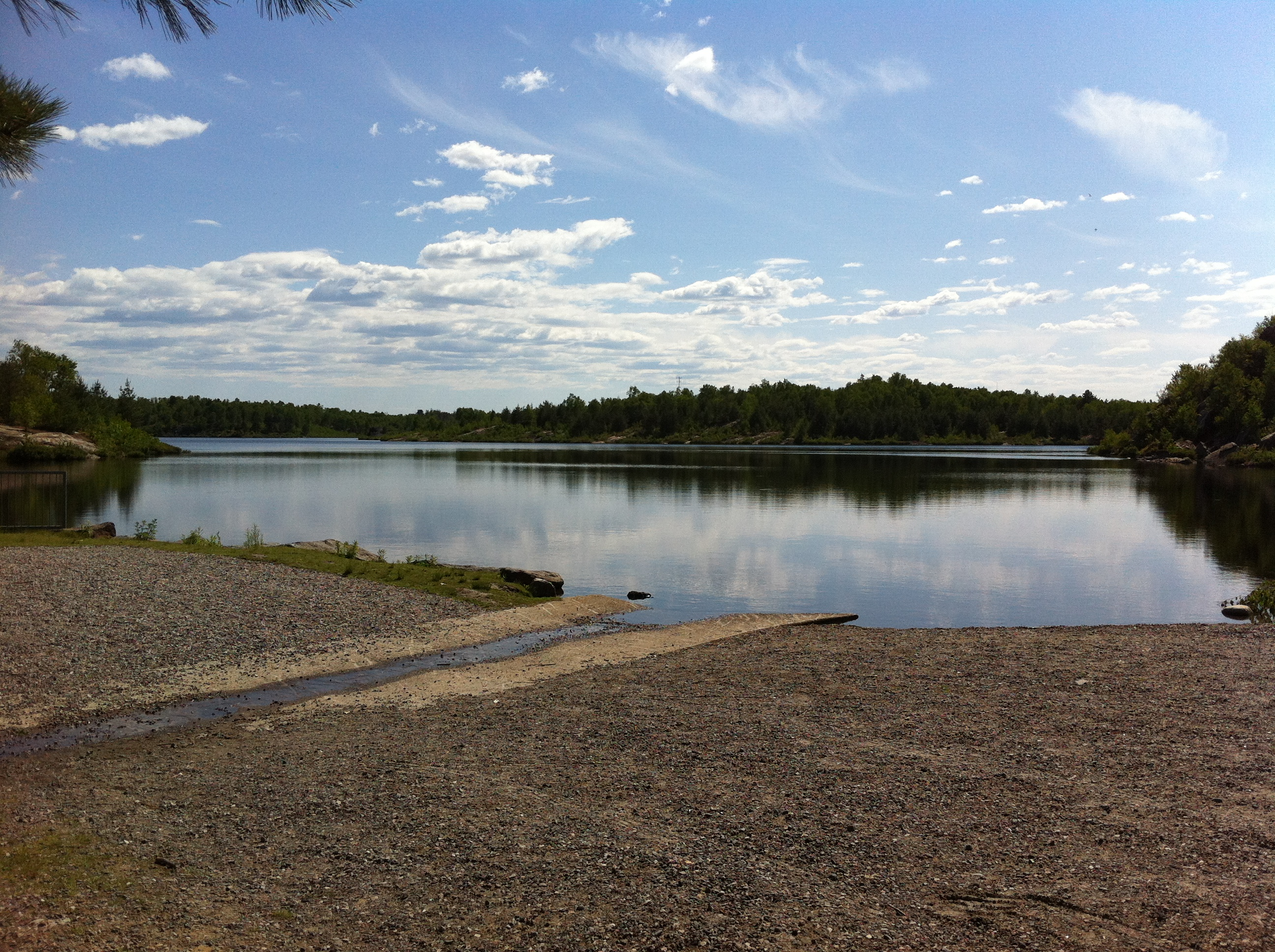
Entrance to Lake Laurentian

Prior to the establishment of the conservation area, several farms and gravel pits existed in the area. The conservation area was established in 1967 by the Junction Creek Conservation Authority, which merged with the Whitson Valley Conservation Authority in 1973 to form the Nickel District Conservation Authority, now called Conservation Sudbury.

By this point, the farms and gravel pits had been abandoned, and the Nature Chalet, completed in 1967, became the only structure in the conservation area. In 1992, another dam was constructed to establish 40 acres (16 ha) of wetland in the conservation area. The dam was rehabilitated in partnership with Ducks Unlimited Canada in 2025.

== Lake Laurentian ==
Lake Laurentian is a man-made lake. Prior to 1958, the lake basin contained a smaller lake called Mud Lake. Nearby, Ramsey Lake had become a principal source of drinking water for the City of Sudbury, and a dam was constructed at the outlet of Mud Lake to better control the quality and quantity of water in Ramsey Lake. In 1982, the lake was fully drained to replace the original dam. The dams, along with two additional backwater dams and several beaver dams, caused the lake basin to gradually flood from an estimated surface area of 54 acres (22 ha) to 385 acres (156 ha) by 2022.

== Ecology ==
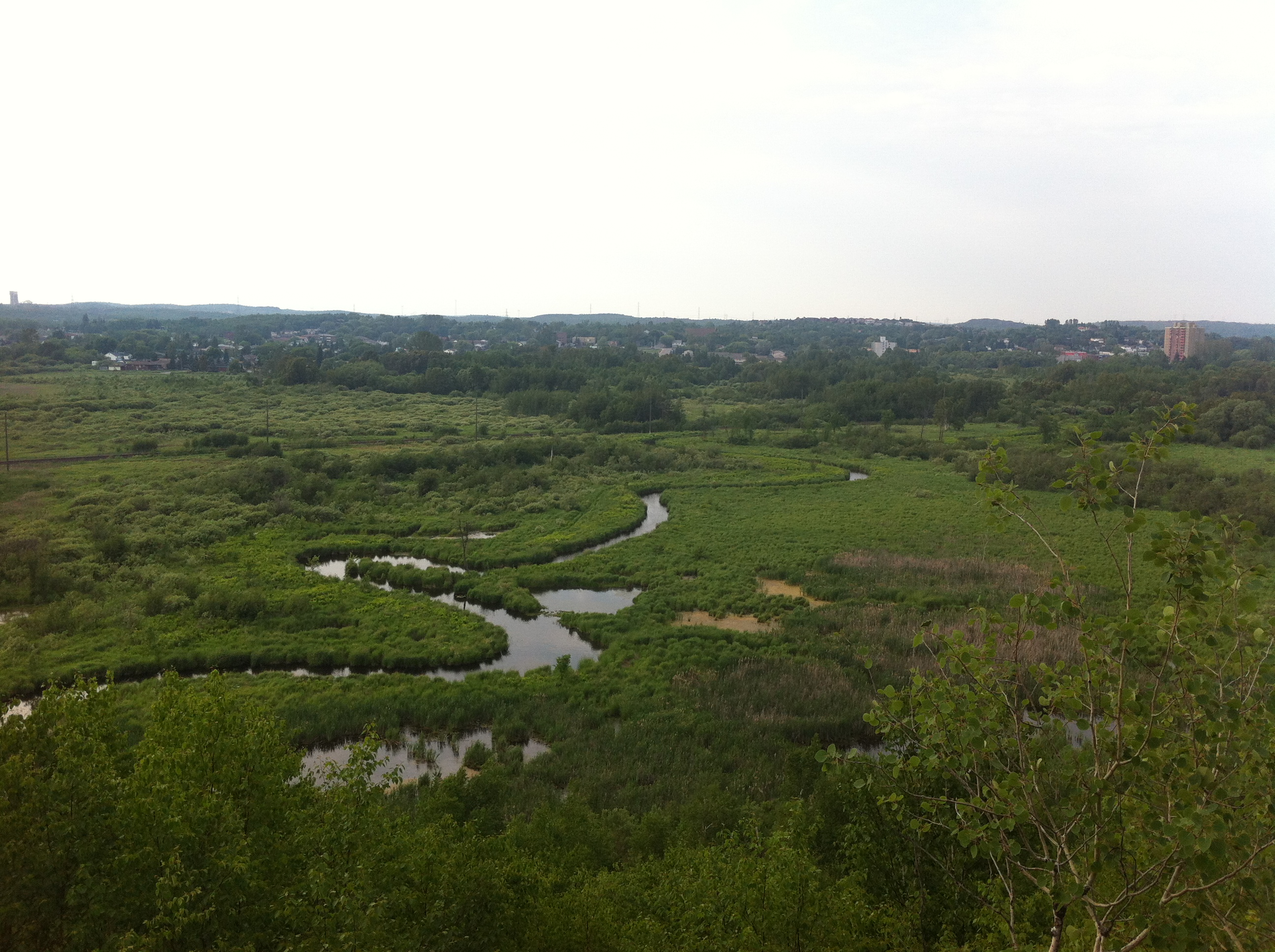
Wetlands in the Conservation Area

Due to the acidification of lakes in the Sudbury area, the result of decades of mining pollution, Lake Laurentian and the nearby Perch Lake were observed to contain no populations of fish in 1980. Despite this, the lakes continued to support a diverse population of waterfowl, amphibians, and mammals. However, a study in 2022 determined that 5 species of fish were now present in the lake, partly due to stocking efforts in the 1990s.

When the lake was drained to replace the original dam in 1982, the polluted sediment was released, which temporarily reduced the water quality of the lake. However, the water quality had improved by 2018, when a water quality assessment indicated that concentrations of metals had significantly declined since 1990. Despite this, the 2018 assessment highlighted a rise in sodium and chloride concentrations in the water, the result of road salt used on the Highway 17 southeast bypass that was constructed in 1992.

== Recreation ==
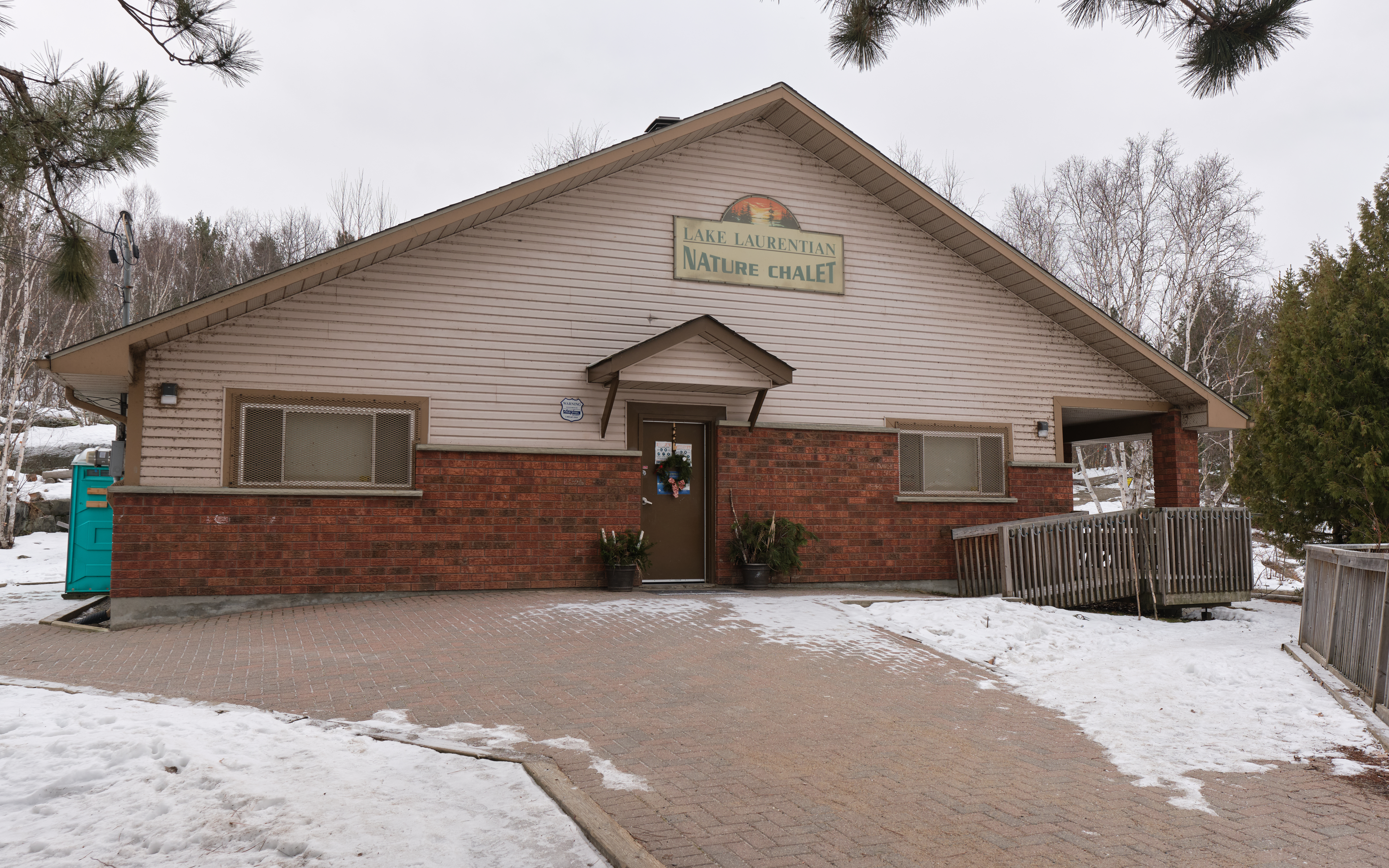
Lake Laurentian Nature Chalet

The conservation area is accessed at the Lake Laurentian Nature Chalet, located to the south of South Bay Road where Lake Laurentian drains into Ramsey Lake. The chalet is the main hub of educational programming and recreational activities within the conservation area.

The trail network of the conservation area is the primary focus of recreation in the area, however the area supports other activities include canoeing, cycling, and fishing. A viewing deck overlooking the lake was completed in 2025.

In winter, cross-country ski trails are maintained in the conservation area, and a children's Christmas bird count is held annually by the Sudbury Ornithological Society to track bird populations in the area.

== See also ==
- Conservation Sudbury
- List of protected areas of Ontario
- Ramsey Lake
