= Lake Simcoe Region Conservation Authority =

Former conservation authority in Ontario, Canada

- Founded: 1951
- Dissolved: 2026
- Purpose: Natural resources conservation and management
- Headquarters: Newmarket, Ontario
- Region served: Lake Simcoe drainage basin
- Website: lsrca.on.ca

The Lake Simcoe Region Conservation Authority was a conservation authority established in 1951, and is among the oldest in the Canadian province of Ontario.

The LSRCA was responsible for the waters, wildlife, and plants within the Lake Simcoe watershed, and has expanded and upgraded its reach and conservation areas several times in the past, gradually assuming control of the Lake Simcoe Watershed in neighbouring regions, such as York RM, Durham RM, Simcoe County, and the City of Kawartha Lakes.

== History ==
=== 1950s: Introduction ===
The LSRCA was established in 1951 by the Department of Planning and Development as the Upper Holland Valley Conservation Authority. It was founded by the municipalities of East Gwillimbury, Township of King, Aurora, Newmarket, and Whitchurch.

In 1954, Hurricane Hazel destroys parts of the Greater Toronto Area. The LSCRA learned from this, and now (like all other conservation authorities) issues Flood alerts, Flood warnings, and Flood bulletins to the Lake Simcoe watershed population, the media, and School Boards. The following year, the Conservation Authority subsidizes tree planting and farm pond construction on private lands.

By 1958, many members express concern due to the explosion of development in Newmarket, and how it may affect the groundwater supplies.

1959 saw many changes, as the Upper Holland Valley Conservation Authority requests the provincial government to pass legislation to control tree-cutting on private and public property. The Conservation Authority also purchases its first plot of land, the 20-acre (81,000 m^{2}) Anchor Park in Holland Landing, Ontario.

=== 1960s: Holland Valley Conservation Authority ===
When the 1960s came, the UHVCA's boundaries expanded to include the entire Holland River and Schomberg River subwatersheds. This added the communities of Bradford, West Gwillimbury, Ontario (which will eventually merge into Bradford-West Gwillimbury), and New Tecumseth, Ontario. The Holland Valley Conservation Authority secured close to 900 acres (3.6 km^{2}) of environmentally significant lands in the 1960s including:

- 1961 – Thorton Bales Conservation Area
- 1961 – Whitchurch-Stouffville Conservation Area
- 1963–1980 – Scanlon Creek Conservation Area
- 1964–1973 – Wesley Brooks Conservation Area
- 1966–1975 – Rogers Reservoir Conservation Area
- 1969–1993 – Mabel Davis Conservation Area

The Conservation Authority also distributes over 5000 copies of their own comic book, named "Dennis The Menace And Dirt", which emphasizes on soil productivity, the importance of soil conservation, and how farming depends on fertile soils. HVCA releases two separate reports in 1961 ("Conservation Report on Land and Forest"), and in 1966 ("Report on Water"). In both reports, the Authority identifies special needs and goals that need to be met, such as improving management of light soils on the Oak Ridges Moraine, encouraging private reforestation, pass regulations that prohibit construction and dumping in flood plains, and the need to fight streambank erosion.

An Emergency Flood Fund was established in 1967, and Centennial tree planting swept across the entire watershed, including reforesting the Scanlon Creek Conservation Area.

=== 1970s: South Lake Simcoe Conservation Authority ===
In 1970, the Conservation Authority planned to plant 3 million trees by the year 2001. In this year, the municipalities of Scott, Ontario, and Georgina, Ontario, joined the Conservation Authority. The name of the authority changed to South Lake Simcoe Conservation Authority in 1971. In 1974, the town of Innisfil joined. The organization established a watershed-wide natural heritage network by creating the following conservation areas:

- 1972–1995 – Willow Beach Conservation Authority
- 1973 Bailey Property/ Ecological Park
- 1974–1981 Franklin Beach Conservation Authority
- 1976–1988 – Queen St. Property
- 1976–1988 Pottageville Site
- 1979 Holmes Point

The 1973 Lake Simcoe Conservation Report was released, and the guidelines stated that the Conservation Authority would monitor and review subdivision plans for home construction, provide landowners with assistance for riverbank upgrades, and establish a flood warning system. The other main goals were to protect water recharge areas, such as marshes, and to continue protection of the Oak Ridges Moraine.

1976 saw the first annual Conservation Authority-sponsored maple syrup festival at the Sheppard's Bush Conservation Area in Aurora. The festival ("Maplefest") continues to this day, and the festival celebrating the Canadian tradition is an enduring success.

=== 1980s: Lake Simcoe Environmental Management Strategy ===
The Lake Simcoe Environmental Management Strategy (LSEMS) is developed, in co-operation with the Ministries of Natural Resources, the Environment, and the Ministry of Agriculture, Food and Rural Affairs. The Conservation Authority added a number of properties to its natural heritage network in the 1980s including:

- 1980 – SLSCA begins work on identifying environmentally significant areas in the watershed.
- 1980–1993 – Tyrwhitt
- 1980–1983 Zephyr Wetlands
- 1982 – Beaverton Dam
- 1982 – Pefferlaw Dam
- 1984 – 1986 Keswick North Watercourse
- 1986 – 1992 – Baldwin Property
- 1986 – 1992 Pangman Springs Conservation Area
- 1997 – Herrema Site
- 1989 – Luck Property

In 1981, the provincial Ministry of the Environment initiated a new study to identify and measure sources of phosphorus entering Lake Simcoe, and to recommend actions needed to reduce these inputs.

In 1985, LSEMS identified phosphorus inputs from both urban and rural sources as the leading cause of the decline of Lake Simcoe's water quality and coldwater fishery.

The LSEMS Team seeks provincial funding in 1986 for programs and services aimed at reducing the amount of phosphorus entering water courses from both urban and rural sources to stop contamination and deterioration of the lake. This year, the Conservation Authority is renamed the Lake Simcoe Region Conservation Authority to better reflect its area of service.

=== 1990s Lake Simcoe Region Conservation Authority ===
The Lake Simcoe Region Conservation Authority wrapped up the millennium, basking in the international spotlight, and solidifying partnerships that will help save Lake Simcoe. The Conservation Authority continued to grow in the 1990s, acquiring land in the Beaver River Wetlands, expanding Willow Beach, and adding Pangman Springs and Mabel Davis Conservation Areas. The LSRCA also increased the size of the Baldwin and Tyrwhitt properties as well as the Zephyr Wetlands.

In 1990, Phase I of the Lake Simcoe Environmental Management Strategy (LSEMS) is launched. The Landowner Environmental Assistance Program (LEAP) of the LSEMS provides the technical and financial support landowners need to complete projects to improve local water quality. The outcome is that 16.5 tonnes of phosphorus would be diverted from Lake Simcoe by the year 2000. The plan would also control and reduce cropland and area erosion, install and upgrade manure storage facilities, restrict livestock access to public water courses (such as creeks and rivers), and reforest concerned areas.

LEAP provides technical and financial support for private landowners to: naturalize riverbanks and streambanks, reforest priority lands, and control streambank erosion.

Two years later, the conservation authority's "Save Our Simcoe" project sweeps across the area. Local youth participate in the "Yellow Fish Road" program to promote the responsible disposal of household hazardous waters, and 1,500 people hear how they can help save Lake Simcoe. The conservation authority also publishes and releases the book "An Action Guide To Improving the Waters of Lake Simcoe".

The LSEMS expands to include the York and Durham Regions, and Simcoe County in 1996. The following year, the LSRCA establishes a new collaborative partnership with the Federal Government's Department of Fisheries and Oceans to protect and enhance Lake Simcoe and its fish habitats.

1999 sees the Conservation Authority start "A Natural Partnership" With York Regional Municipality to protect what is natural and restore damaged and degraded areas in York Region.

=== 2000s: Looking into the Future ===
In 2001, the LSRCA began to deliver its programs and services to parts of York and Durham Regions, the City of Kawartha Lakes, and Simcoe County.

== 2026 Dissolution ==
On March 19 2026, the Ontario Government announced that the Lake Simcoe Region Conservation Authority was being folded into the new Lake Huron Regional Conservation Authority.

== Conservation areas and parks ==
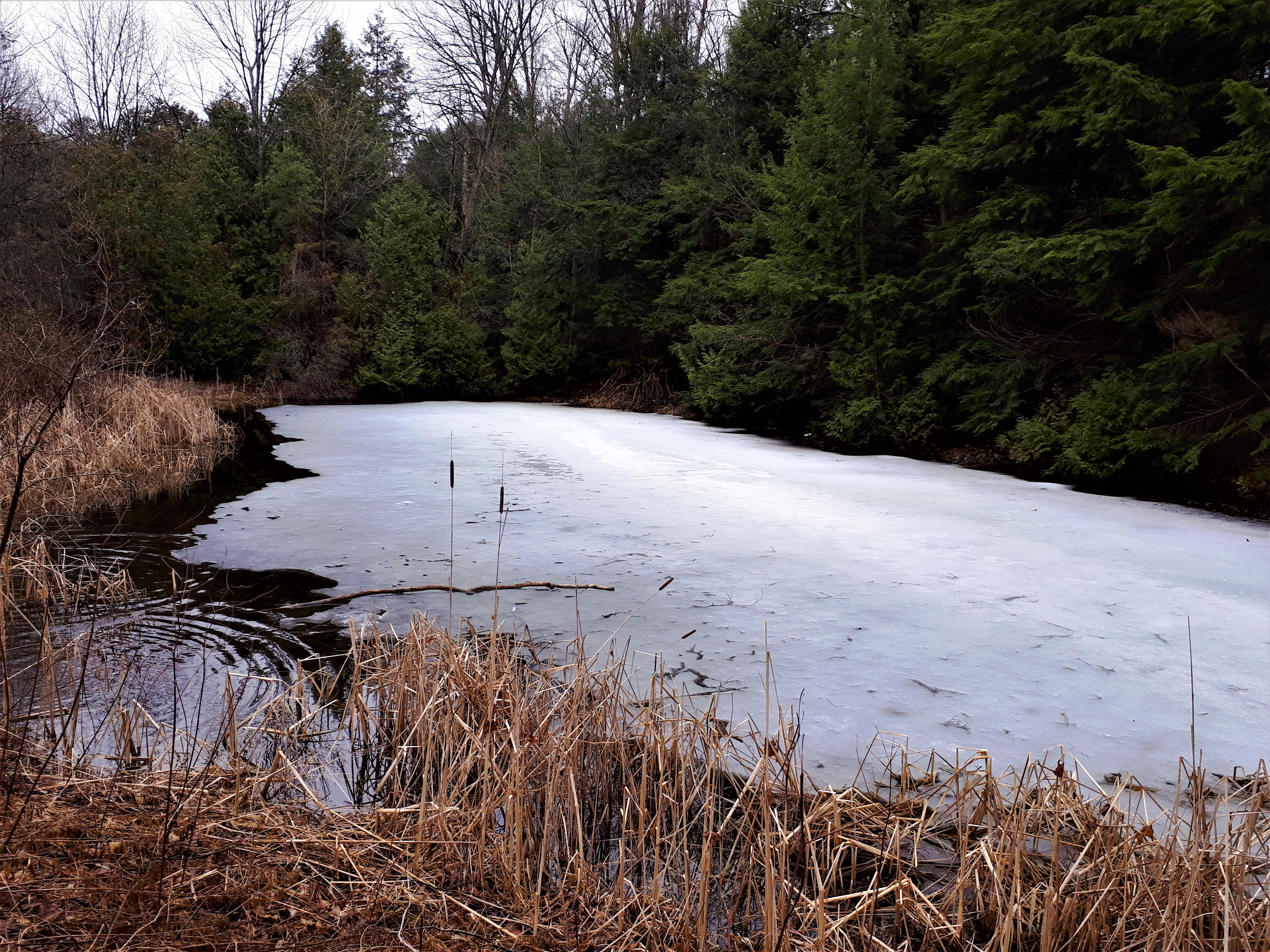
Pangman Springs Conservation Area

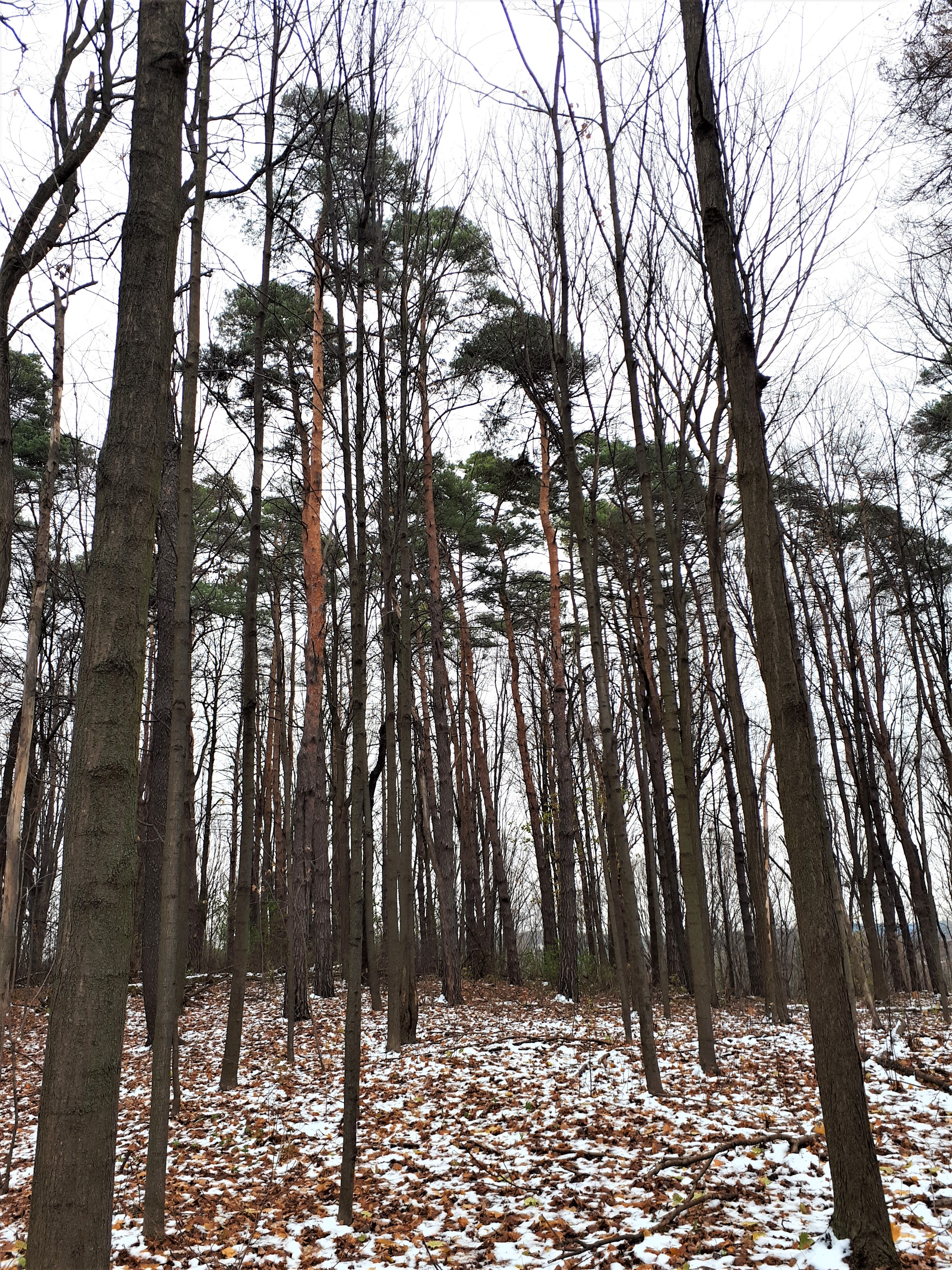
Sheppard's Bush Conservation Area

- Bailey Ecological Park
- Baldwin Conservation Area
- Beaver River Wetland Conservation Area
- Durham Regional Forest
- Franklin Beach
- Herema Property
- Holland Landing Conservation Area
- Holmes Point Conservation Area
- Keswick North Course
- Luck Property
- Mabel Davis Conservation Area
- Pangman Springs
- Pefferlaw Conservation Area
- Rogers Reservoir Conservation Area
- Scanlon Creek Conservation Area
- Sheppard's Bush Conservation Area
- Thornton Bales Conservation Area
- Tyrwhitt Conservation Area
- Wesley Brooks Memorial Conservation Area
- Whitchurch Conservation Area
- Willow Beach Conservation Area
- Zephyr Creek Wetland
