= Central Lake Ontario Conservation Authority =

Conservation authority in Ontario, Canada

- Founded: 1958
- Purpose: Natural resources conservation and management
- Region served: Durham Region
- Website: www.cloca.com

Central Lake Ontario Conservation Authority (CLOCA), is a conservation authority established under the Conservation Authorities Act of Ontario in 1958. It forms a partnership with the Province of Ontario, the Ministry of Natural Resources, the regional municipality of Durham, and its constituent local municipalities.

== Conservation areas ==
- Bowmanville / Westside Marshes Conservation Area
- Crow's Pass Conservation Area
- Enniskillen Conservation Area
- Heber Down Conservation Area
- Long Sault Conservation Area
- Lynde Shores Conservation Area
- Purple Woods Conservation Area
- Stephen's Gulch Conservation Area
