= Quinte Conservation =

Conservation authority in Ontario, Canada

Coordinates: 44°10′N 77°23′W

The Quinte Conservation is a conservation authority in the province of Ontario. It is headquartered in Belleville, Ontario. Quinte Conservation was created as a result of the amalgamation of three local conservation authorities in 1996; Moira River, Prince Edward Region and the Napanee Region authorities.

The authority was established in 1995, but the three conservation authorities that make up Quinte Conservation were created much earlier: Moira and Napanee were both formed in 1947, with Prince Edward Region formed in 1965.

Both Moira and Napanee were quick to respond following the passage of the Conservation Authorities Act in 1946, legislated by the provincial government that year in response to a concern expressed by agricultural, naturalist and sportsman's groups who felt the province's renewable natural resources were in an unhealthy state. Although the responsibility for managing natural resources lay within the province, the extent of erosion and water concerns was such that a new approach was deemed necessary. Years of drought and deforestation had led to extensive soil loss and flooding in the province and the time had come to regroup and address growing conservation issues.

== Conservation authorities ==
By 1947, half a dozen municipalities had already accepted the responsibility of urging the government of Ontario to form an authority within their watershed jurisdictions. These newly formed conservation authorities would have jurisdiction over one or more individual watersheds, charged with the responsibility of addressing flooding issues in a complete and rational way. By having the power to establish regulations, these Authorities were now able to protect life and property, flood prone areas from building encroachment, and erosion problems. For example, in the wake of Hurricane Hazel in Toronto in 1954, which devastated that city with torrential rains and extensive flooding, the Toronto and Region Conservation Authority was formed to ensure that such destruction and loss of life would never happen again.

Since this rather humble beginning in 1946, today's 36 conservation authorities operate in watersheds in which 90 percent of the provincial population resides. Managing Ontario's watershed resources is a massive undertaking involving foresters, ecologists, planners, local municipal members, engineers, agroscientists, educators, and a host of others, who work harmoniously together with watershed residents in addressing conservation related problems within their watershed.

=== Moira River Conservation Authority ===
The Moira River Conservation Authority was formed July 31, 1947. It is part of a large system of rivers, creeks and lakes that drains an area of almost 3,000 square kilometres. Due to the Moira watershed's history of serious floods the province declared the MRCA in 1984 as the lead agency in protecting lives and property from the dangers of flooding. Quinte Conservation owns 20,653 acres (83.58 km^{2}) of public conservation lands of which 12 are conservation areas within the watershed area of the Moira River.

=== Napanee Region Conservation Authority ===
The Napanee Region Conservation Authority was formed November 20, 1947, comprising about 2,000 square kilometres. Quinte Conservation owns 11,247 acres (45.51 km^{2}) of public conservation lands of which 9 are conservation areas within the watersheds of the Salmon and Napanee Rivers.

=== Prince Edward Region Conservation Authority ===
The Prince Edward Region Conservation Authority was formed December 9, 1965, encompassing over 1,000 square kilometres. Quinte Conservation owns and maintains 915 acres (3.70 km^{2}) of conservation lands, all of which are conservation areas (14) within Prince Edward County.

With the amalgamation of these three conservation authorities in 1996, in the wake of provincial budget constraints, Quinte Conservation became a provincial leader in streamlining operations while still providing an excellent level of service to its municipalities.

== Conservation areas ==
- Beaver Meadow Wildlife Area
- Deerock Lake Conservation Area
- Depot Lakes Conservation Area and Campground
- H.R. Frink Conservation Area and Outdoor Education Centre
- Little Bluff Conservation Area
- Macaulay Mountain Conservation Area
- Massassauga Point Conservation Area
- O'Hara Mill Homestead and Conservation Area
- Potter's Creek Conservation Area
- Sheffield Conservation Area
- Sidney Conservation Area
- Vanderwater Conservation Area
