= North Bay-Mattawa Conservation Authority =

The North Bay-Mattawa Conservation Authority (NBMCA) is one of 36 conservation authorities in Ontario, Canada consisting of 16 Conservation Areas.

It is responsible for conservation areas within North Bay, but also extending into the surrounding municipalities. In addition to Conservation Areas, the NBMCA has local jurisdiction in 4 program areas: environmental planning review & watershed management, on-site sewage inspection under the Ontario Building Code, environmental education, and source water protection.

== Conservation areas ==
The North Bay-Mattawa Conservation Authority manages seven conservation areas and one nature preserve.

- Corbeil Conservation Area
- Eau Claire Gorge Conservation Area
- La Vase Portage Conservation Area
- Laurentian Escarpment Conservation Area
- Laurier Woods Conservation Area
- Powassan Mountain Conservation Area
- Shields McLaren Conservation Area
- JP Webster Nature Preserve
