= Ausable Bayfield Conservation Authority =

Conservation authority in Ontario, Canada

Ausable Bayfield Conservation Authority (ABCA) is a local conservation agency named in the Ontario Conservation Authorities Act. Located in Southern Ontario, the agency focuses on the conservation of the drainage basins of the Ausable River, Bayfield River, Parkhill Creek, and Gullies (Bayfield North and South Gullies) watersheds. The headquarters is located in Exeter, Ontario.

The ABCA manages conservation and wildlife areas that were purchased for the preservation and protection of source areas and flood plain areas. Some environmentally significant areas are not publicly accessible.

Hay Swamp Management Area is administered by the agency.

== History ==
The former Ausable River Conservation Authority was formed in 1946. There were local conservation organizations in Ontario before ABCA, and some others formed around the same time, but Ausable Bayfield Conservation Authority lays claim to being Ontario's first conservation authority.

A community strategy group of 34 people met monthly between 2010 and 2011 to create a conservation strategy for the organization. This community group included local farmers; residents of rural, urban, and lakeshore communities in the watershed; municipalities; public health; youth; and other stakeholders.

The Ausable Bayfield Conservation Authority developed "The Path Forward: Your Community Conservation Strategy for Ausable Bayfield Watersheds". The Conservation Strategy was adopted by the Board of Directors of ABCA on December 15, 2011, and the document was published and released to the public in March 2012.

== Conservation areas ==
- Ausable River Cut Conservation Area
- Bannockburn Conservation Area
- Clinton Conservation Area
- Crediton Conservation Area
- Morrison Dam Conservation Area
- Parkhill Conservation Area
- Rock Glen Conservation Area
- South Huron Trail - MacNaughton-Morrison Trail and Morrison Dam Conservation Area Sections
- Zurich Conservation Area
