= St. Clair Region Conservation Authority =

Conservation authority in Ontario, Canada

Coordinates: 42.96244°N 81.61814°W

St. Clair Region Conservation Authority logo

The St. Clair Region Conservation Authority is a conservation authority in the province of Ontario. It is headquartered in Strathroy, Ontario. The conservation authority's jurisdiction covers all of the waterways that feed into the St. Clair River.

The authority was established in 1961 to help clean up the environment.

== Protected areas ==
- A.W. Campbell Conservation Area
- Bridgeview Conservation Area
- C. J. McEwen Conservation Area
- Centennial Park, Strathroy, Ontario
- Clark Wright Conservation Area
- Coldstream Conservation Area
- Crothers Conservation Area
- Esli Dodge Conservation Area
- Highland Glen Conservation Area
- Keith McLean Conservation Lands
- Lambton County Heritage Forest
- Lorne C. Henderson Conservation Area
- Marthaville Habitat Management Area
- McKeough Conservation Area
- Moore Habitat Management Area
- Peers Wetland
- Perch Creek Habitat Management Area
- Shetland Conservation Area
- Strathroy Conservation Area
- Sydenham River Canoe Race Start
- Warwick Conservation Area
- Wawanosh Conservation Area
