= Conservation Authorities Act =

Ontario, Canada statute

The Conservation Authorities Act (French: Loi sur les offices de protection de la nature) was created by the Ontario Provincial Legislature in 1946 to ensure the conservation, restoration and responsible management of hydrological features through programs that balance human, environmental and economic needs. The Act authorizes the formation of Conservation Authorities on a per watershed basis. The Act is administered by the Ministry of Natural Resources.

== History ==
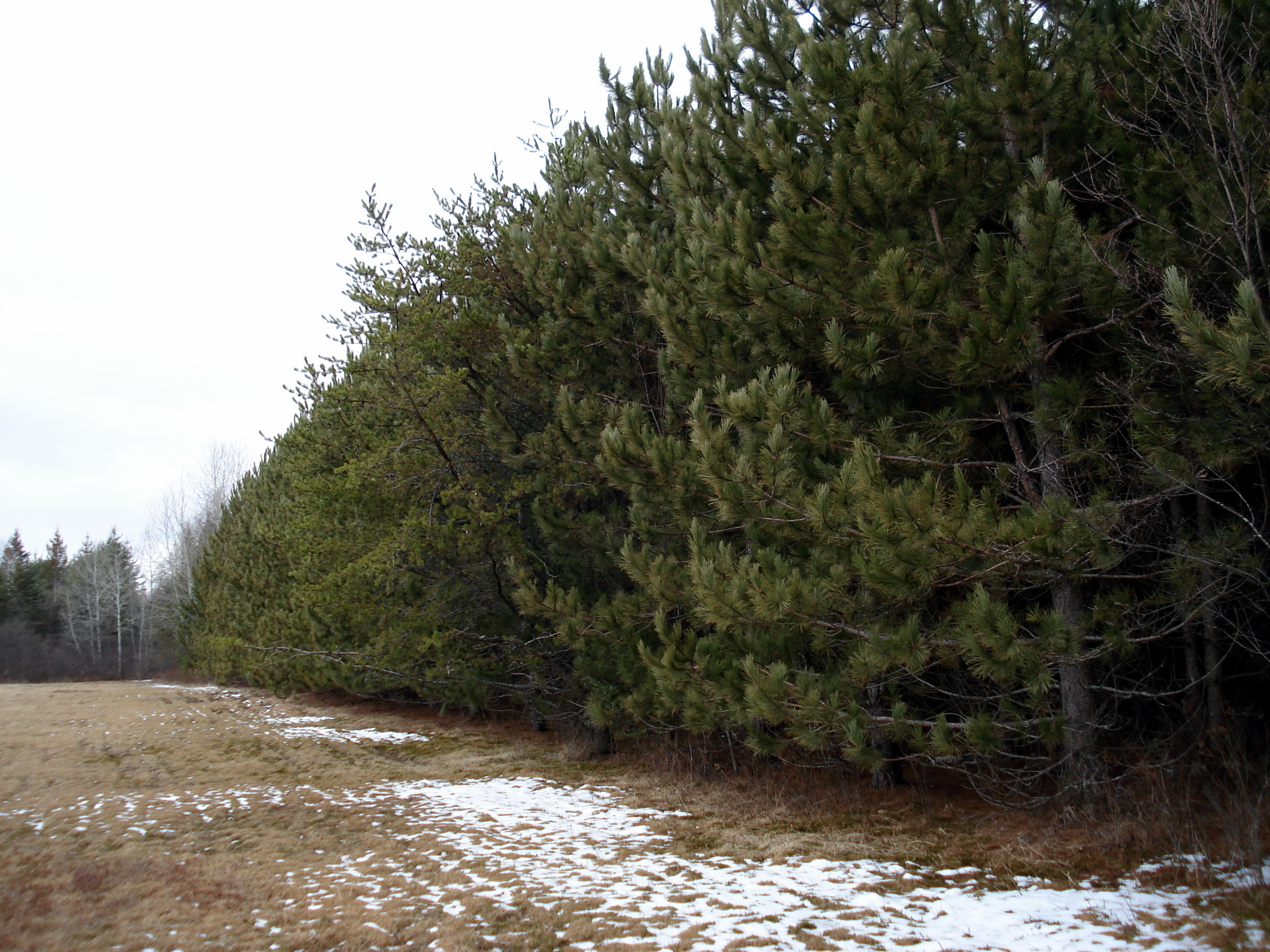
A 21-year-old plantation of red pine in Southern Ontario.

In 1941, conservationists from across the province met in Guelph to address the extensive damage to southern Ontario's environment. Great tracts of land had been ruined through clearing watersheds for farming, over-cutting of the forest and through faulty farming practices. The conference, under the leadership of J.D. Thomas, chose the Ganaraska watershed, one of the most damaged in the province, as its pilot project. Over the next few years, they worked to restore the natural values of the watershed, mostly by planting trees. Its restoration marked the beginning of the conservation authorities of Ontario. The Conservation Authorities Act was passed in 1946. Over the next four decades, the Ganaraska watershed became one of the largest forested areas of southern Ontario with two million trees planted.

In 2019, the Government of Ontario passed amendments to the act, defining each conservation authority's required functions:

1. A program or service that meets any of the following descriptions and that has been prescribed by the regulations:

- Programs and services related to the risk of natural hazards
- Programs and services related to the conservation and management of lands owned or controlled by the authority, including any interests in land registered on title
- Programs and services related to the authority's duties, functions and responsibilities as a source protection authority under the Clean Water Act, 2006
- Programs and services related to the authority's duties, functions and responsibilities under an Act prescribed by the regulations

2. A program or service, other than a program or service described in paragraph 1, that has been prescribed by the regulations on or before the first anniversary of the day prescribed under clause 40 (3) (h). 2019, c. 9, Sched. 2, s. 4.

Source: Subsection 21.1, Amended Conservation Authorities Act.

The Government also amended section 23, which provides for the Government to name an investigator:

"The Minister may, at any time, appoint one or more investigators to conduct an investigation of an authority’s operations, including the programs and services it provides."

At the same time that the amendments were introduced into the Legislative Assembly, the Government cut its funding to conservation authorities for flood control from CA$7.4 million per year by half, wanting the authorities to focus on "core" activities. The Ontario Government now funds only 1-5% of most conservation authority's operations. Authorities are largely funded by municipalities, self-generated revenue and fundraising.

== See also ==
- Clean Water Act (Ontario)
- Grand River Conservation Authority
- Hurricane Hazel
- Toronto and Region Conservation Authority
- Reforestation
